= Sovereignty Restoration Day =

Hawaiian national holiday

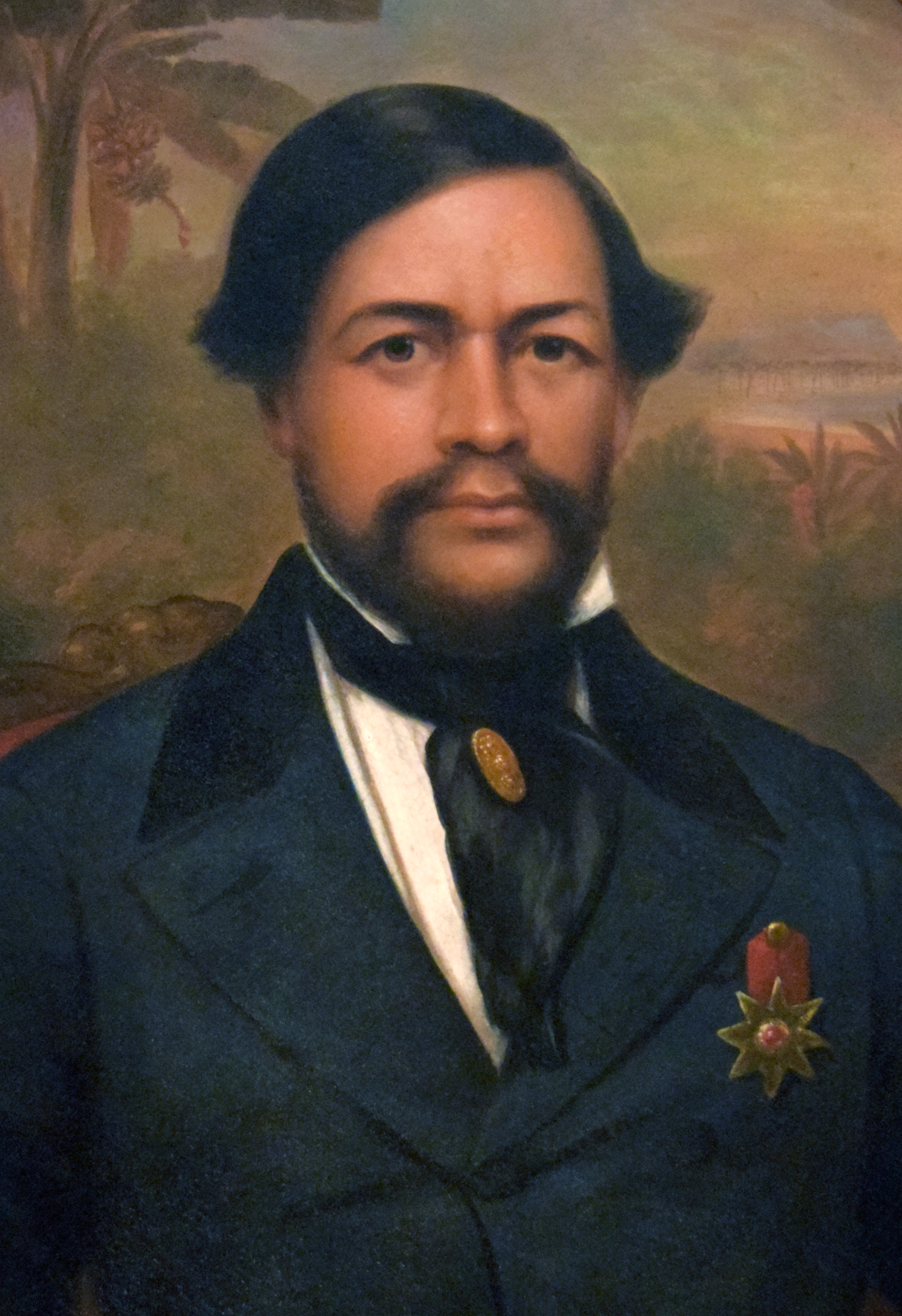
- Kamehameha III, King of the Hawaiian Islands from 1825 to 1854
- Official name: Lā Hoʻihoʻi Ea
- Also called: Hawaiian Restoration Day
- Observed by: Hawaii
- Significance: Restoration of the sovereignty of Hawaiian Kingdom following British occupation during the Paulet Affair (1843)
- Date: July 31
- Next time: July 31, 2027
- Frequency: annual
- First time: 1843
- Related to: Hawaiian Independence Day

Sovereignty Restoration Day (Hawaiian: Lā Hoʻihoʻi Ea) is a national holiday of the former Hawaiian Kingdom celebrated on July 31 and still commemorated by Native Hawaiians in the state of Hawaii. It honors the restoration of sovereignty to the kingdom, by British Rear-Admiral Richard Darton Thomas, following the occupation of Hawaiʻi by the United Kingdom during the 1843 Paulet Affair and when King Kamehameha III uttered the phrase: Ua Mau ke Ea o ka ʻĀina i ka Pono ('The life of the land is perpetuated in righteousness').

During the monarchy, the holiday was observed annually by the native and foreign communities in Hawaii. King Kamehameha V, who deemed the holiday inappropriate, officially dropped it as a national holiday in 1867 and replaced with Kamehameha Day (on June 11). It was briefly revived as a national holiday from 1891 until the overthrow of the Hawaiian Kingdom in 1893. During the ensuing years of the 1890s, the holiday continued to be observed privately by loyalists of the monarchy as a form of opposition and resistance. It is still celebrated by proponents of the Hawaiian sovereignty movement as a day of resistance against what sovereignty advocates consider an ongoing American occupation of Hawaiʻi. In 2022, the day was recognized by the State of Hawaii as a special day of remembrance.

== Background ==
On February 10, 1843, Captain Lord George Paulet, of HMS Carysfort landed in Honolulu in response to the complaints by the British Consul in Honolulu Richard Charlton, who had an underlying land dispute with the Hawaiian government, and claimed British subjects were being denied their legal rights. Paulet, without the authorization of his superiors, unilaterally occupied the kingdom in the name of Queen Victoria on February 25 despite the protests of Hawaiian King Kamehameha III and his ministers. The Hawaiian king ceded his sovereignty under protest to the British government. Paulet placed himself and a committee in charge, restricted trade in the ports, destroyed all Hawaiian flags that could be found, and raised the British Union Jack in their place.

After a five-month occupation, Rear-Admiral Richard Darton Thomas, the Commander-in-Chief of the Pacific Station, sailed into Honolulu on his flagship HMS Dublin on July 26, 1843, and requested an interview with the king. Kamehameha III was more than happy to tell his side of the story, and a new treaty was negotiated with the British giving British subjects on the islands "perfect equality with the most favored foreigners".

On July 31, 1843, Thomas raised the Hawaiian flag in place of the Union Jack at the plains east of Honolulu (now part of downtown Honolulu), formally ending the occupation, and gave a speech affirming the independence and sovereignty of the Hawaiian kingdom and the friendship of the British government. The site of the ceremony was later made into a park in honor of the event and named Thomas Square.

== Official observation ==
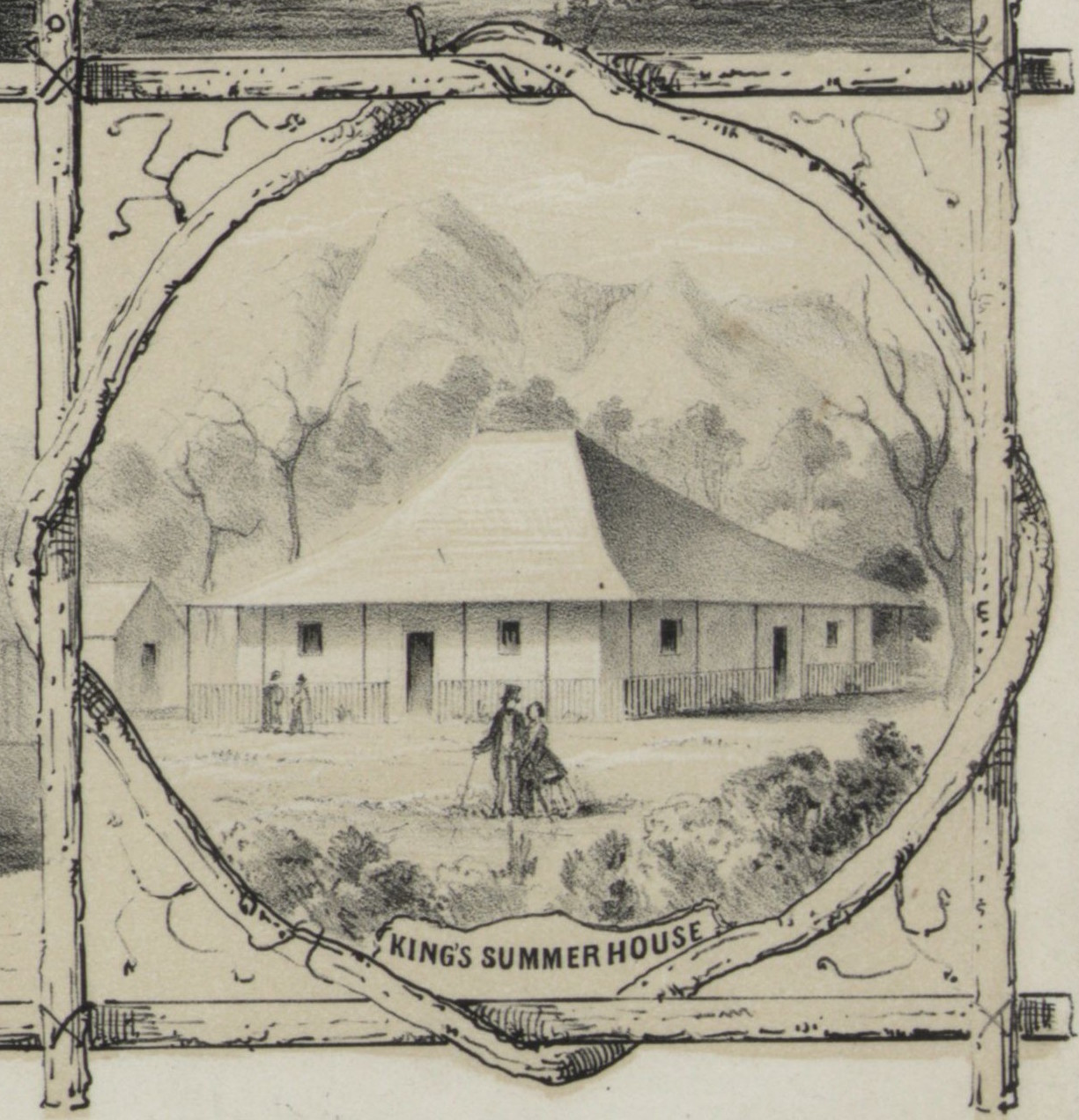
The King's Summer House (1853), lithograph by Paul Emmert. This was the site of the 1847 grand luau attended by ten thousand guests.

Following the restoration of sovereignty at Thomas Square, King Kamehameha III held an afternoon thanksgiving service at Kawaiahaʻo Church where he uttered the phrase: Ua Mau ke Ea o ka ʻĀina i ka Pono ("The life of the land is preserved in the righteousness of the people"). This phrase was adopted in 1959 as the motto of the state of Hawaii. The king declared a ten-day holiday and the entire community including foreigners and native Hawaiians rejoiced in festivities with a lavish luau of suckling pig, fish and poi. The event was later made into an annual holiday and was observed by his successor King Kamehameha IV (1855–1864). During the fourth anniversary of the restoration in 1847, King Kamehameha III and his wife Queen Kalama hosted a grand luau at their summer palace, Kaniakapupu, attended by an estimated ten thousand guests.

During the latter part of the reign of King Kamehameha V (1864–1872) the celebration was deemed inappropriate by the king and his ministers since it brought back unpleasant memories of the British occupation by Paulet, and the official holiday was discontinued. The holiday was still being officially sanctioned in 1865 and 1866. No public celebration was held in 1867, and it ceased to be officially observed. There are also later assertions that the holiday was dropped "to suit the delicate feelings of a few Englishmen who did not like the memory of these events revived". However, the anniversary was still remembered by people in private. In 1872, the king replaced the holiday with Kamehameha Day (on June 11) to honor his grandfather Kamehameha I who had conquered and united the Hawaiian Islands in 1810. This is the only holiday from the time of the Hawaiian monarchy that remains an official holiday of the state of Hawaii.

The 1890 session of the Hawaiian legislature briefly restored the date as a national holiday effective July 31, 1891, during the reign of Queen Liliuokalani. In 1893, the Hawaiian monarchy was overthrown and the queen yielded her authority to the United States government under protest. The Provisional Government of Hawaii, which was established as an interim regime while a treaty of annexation was being pushed through the United States Congress, abolished the holiday. Private observance of the fiftieth anniversary on July 31, 1893, was watched by the oligarchical government with an air of suspicion, while royalists and supporters of the deposed queen hoped in vain for another restoration to occur. After 1893, the holiday continued to be observed privately by loyalists of the monarchy as a form of opposition and resistance. By the time the Territory of Hawaii was organized in 1898 the holiday had become a historical footnote.

== Modern-day observation ==
The inverted Hawaiian flag represents the Hawaiian Kingdom in distress and is the main symbol of the Hawaiian sovereignty movement.

The tradition of this celebration was revived in 1985 by Hawaiian sovereignty movement activist Kekuni Blaisdell during the Hawaiian Renaissance. Today, the holiday is upheld by proponents of the Hawaiian sovereignty movement who compare the British occupation of 1843 to what they believe is the ongoing modern American occupation of the islands and believe the United States government should "follow the example of the British to restore the Hawaiian nation". In Honolulu, the holiday is marked by the celebration of Hawaiian culture, history and activism through organized speeches, presentations, marches, hula performances, music rallies and flag-raising. On the other islands, sovereignty groups organize historical reenactments, rallies, and the ceremonial raising of the Hawaiian flag in place of the American flag.

On July 31, 2018, a 12-foot bronze statue of Kamehameha III and a flagpole flying the Hawaiian flag was unveiled at Thomas Square in a ceremony honoring the 175th anniversary of the restoration of Hawaiian sovereignty in 1843. The statue was created by Oregon artist Thomas Jay Warren for $250,000 allotted by the Mayor's Office of Culture and the Arts and is part of Mayor Kirk Caldwell's plans to revamp the park. Thomas Square is one of four sites in Hawaii where the Hawaiian flag is allowed to fly alone without the United States flag. The others are the Royal Mausoleum at Mauna ʻAla, ʻIolani Palace and Puʻuhonua o Hōnaunau.

In 2022, the State of Hawaii passed a legislative bill officially recognizing Lā Hoʻihoʻi Ea as a special day of observance.

== Bibliography ==
- Clark, John (2019). "The Kamehameha III Statue in Thomas Square". The Hawaiian Journal of History. 53. Honolulu: Hawaiian Historical Society: 147–149. doi:10.1353/hjh.2019.0008. ISSN 2169-7639. OCLC 60626541. S2CID 214511964. Archived from the original on October 1, 2020.
- Fuller, Landry (August 2, 2016). "Flying high". West Hawaii Today. Kailua-Kona: Oahu Publications, Inc. Archived from the original on July 27, 2020.
- Fujii, Jocelyn (December 2012 – January 2013). "Of King & Country". Hana Hou!. Vol. 15, no. 6. Honolulu. Archived from the original on February 23, 2020.
- Gilman, Gorham D. (1892). Thrum, Thomas G. (ed.). "Restoration Day: A Recollection". Hawaiian Almanac and Annual for 1893. Honolulu: Honolulu Star-Bulletin. pp. 70–77. hdl:10524/663.
- Hoʻokahua Staff (July 2014). "Lā Hoʻihoʻi Ea: Hawaiʻi Commemorates Sovereignty Restoration Day". Kaleinamanu Hawaiian Cultural Center, Kamehameha Schools. Archived from the original on October 11, 2014.
- Hoover, Will (August 1, 2004). "Hawaiians mark restoration day". The Honolulu Advertiser. Honolulu: Black Press. Archived from the original on October 30, 2004.
- Kuykendall, Ralph Simpson (1965) [1938]. The Hawaiian Kingdom 1778–1854, Foundation and Transformation. Vol. 1. Honolulu: University of Hawaii Press. ISBN 0-87022-431-X. OCLC 47008868. Archived from the original on September 25, 2014.
- McDougall, Brandy Nalani (2016). Finding Meaning: Kaona and Contemporary Hawaiian Literature. Tucson: University of Arizona Press. ISBN 978-0-8165-3385-5. OCLC 946967118.
- Nogelmeier, Puakea; Clark, John (2018). "Dedication of Kamehameha III, A Sculpture by Thomas Jay Warren". The Hawaiian Journal of History. 52. Honolulu: Hawaiian Historical Society: 151–159. doi:10.1353/hjh.2018.0006. ISSN 2169-7639. OCLC 60626541. S2CID 192697974. Archived from the original on August 13, 2020.
- Pacific Worlds (2003). "Kaniakapupu". Pacific Worlds. Archived from the original on November 27, 2010.
- Riconda, Dorothy (March 23, 1972). "Thomas Square nomination form". National Register of Historic Places. United States National Park Service. Archived from the original on August 6, 2020.
- Schmitt, Robert C. (1995). "Holidays in Hawaiʻi". Hawaiian Journal of History. 29. Honolulu: Hawaiian Historical Society: 141–146. hdl:10524/338.
- Scottmaui (August 2, 2005). "Hawaiian "Sovereignty Restoration Day"". Daily Kos. Archived from the original on January 22, 2025.
- "State designates July 31 "A Special Day of Observance" remembering Lā Hoʻihoʻi Ea". Maui Now. Wailuku. July 18, 2022.
- Thrum, Thomas G., ed. (1892). "History of the Provisional Cession of the Hawaiian Islands and Their Restoration". Hawaiian Almanac and Annual for 1893. Honolulu: Honolulu Star-Bulletin. pp. 45–70. hdl:10524/663.
- Thrum, Thomas G., ed. (1898). "The Days We Celebrate ; Holidays and Their Observance". Hawaiian Almanac and Annual for 1898. Honolulu: Honolulu Star-Bulletin. pp. 62–69. hdl:10524/23170.
- Thrum, Thomas G., ed. (1909). "Hawaiian Holidays". Hawaiian Almanac and Annual for 1910. Honolulu: Honolulu Star-Bulletin. pp. 110–116.
- Thrum, Thomas G., ed. (1929). "Holiday Observances In Monarchial Days". Hawaiian Almanac and Annual for 1930. Honolulu: Honolulu Star-Bulletin. pp. 101–106. hdl:10524/32427.
- Tranquilli, Betsy (August 1, 2005). "Group re-enacts 1843 replacing of Union Jack with Hawaiian flag". West Hawaii Today. Kailua-Kona, HI.
- Yang, Gordon Y. K. (July 28, 2018). "King Kamehameha III bronze statue to be unveiled at Thomas Square". Honolulu Star-Advertiser. Honolulu: Oahu Publications, Inc. Archived from the original on December 22, 2024.
