= Independence Day (Hawaii) =

National holiday in Hawaii

Hawaiian Independence Day
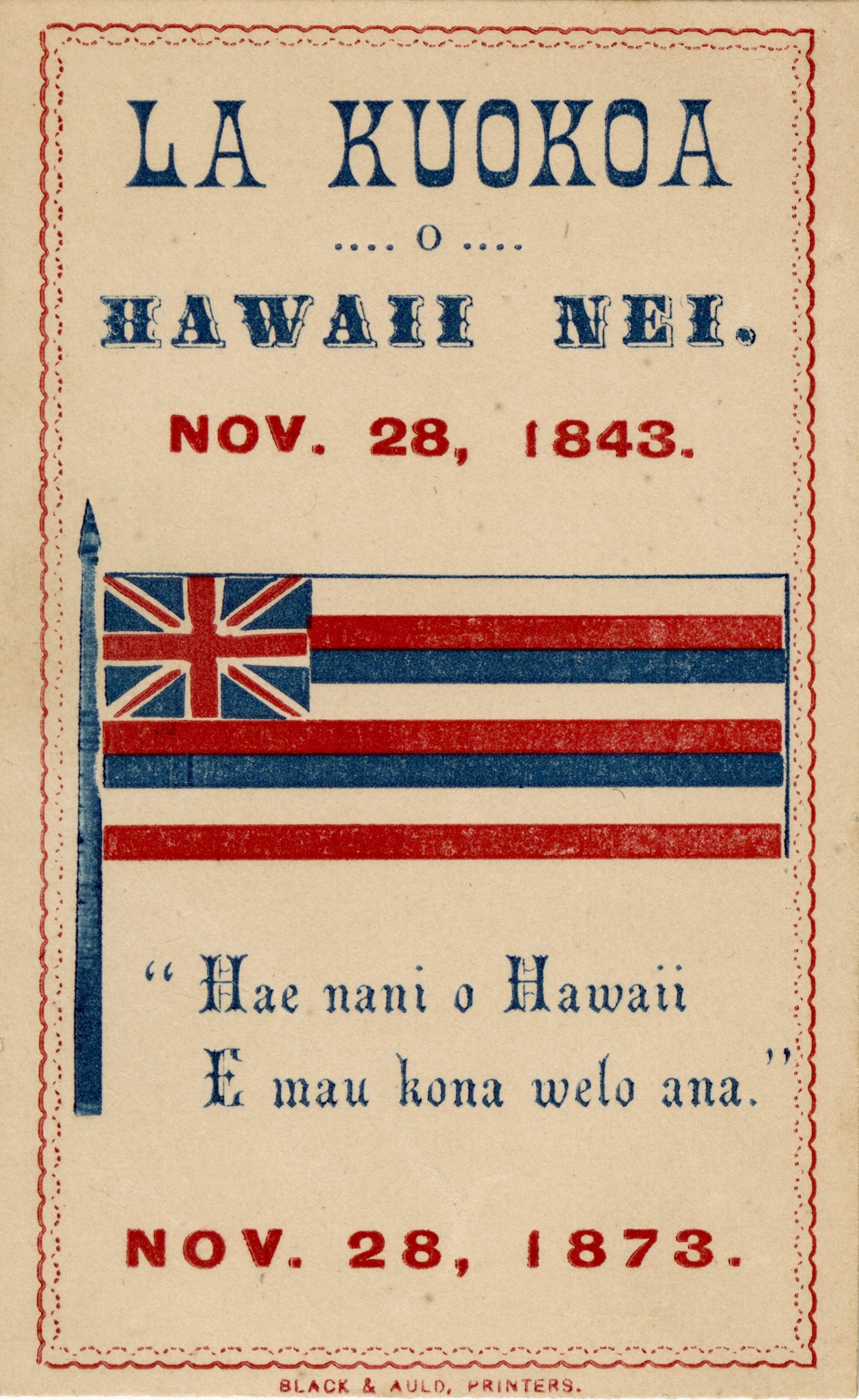
- Flyer for the 30th anniversary celebration in 1873
- Official name: Lā Kūʻokoʻa
- Observed by: Hawaii
- Significance: International recognition of the independence of the Hawaiian Kingdom
- Date: November 28
- Next time: November 28, 2026
- Frequency: annual
- First time: 1843
- Related to: Hawaiian Sovereignty Restoration Day

Hawaiian Independence Day (Hawaiian: Lā Kūʻokoʻa) is a national holiday celebrated annually on November 28 to commemorate the signing of Anglo-Franco Proclamation of 1843, the official diplomatic recognition of the independence and sovereignty of the Hawaiian Kingdom by Great Britain and France. It continues to be celebrated today by proponents of the Hawaiian sovereignty movement.

== Background ==
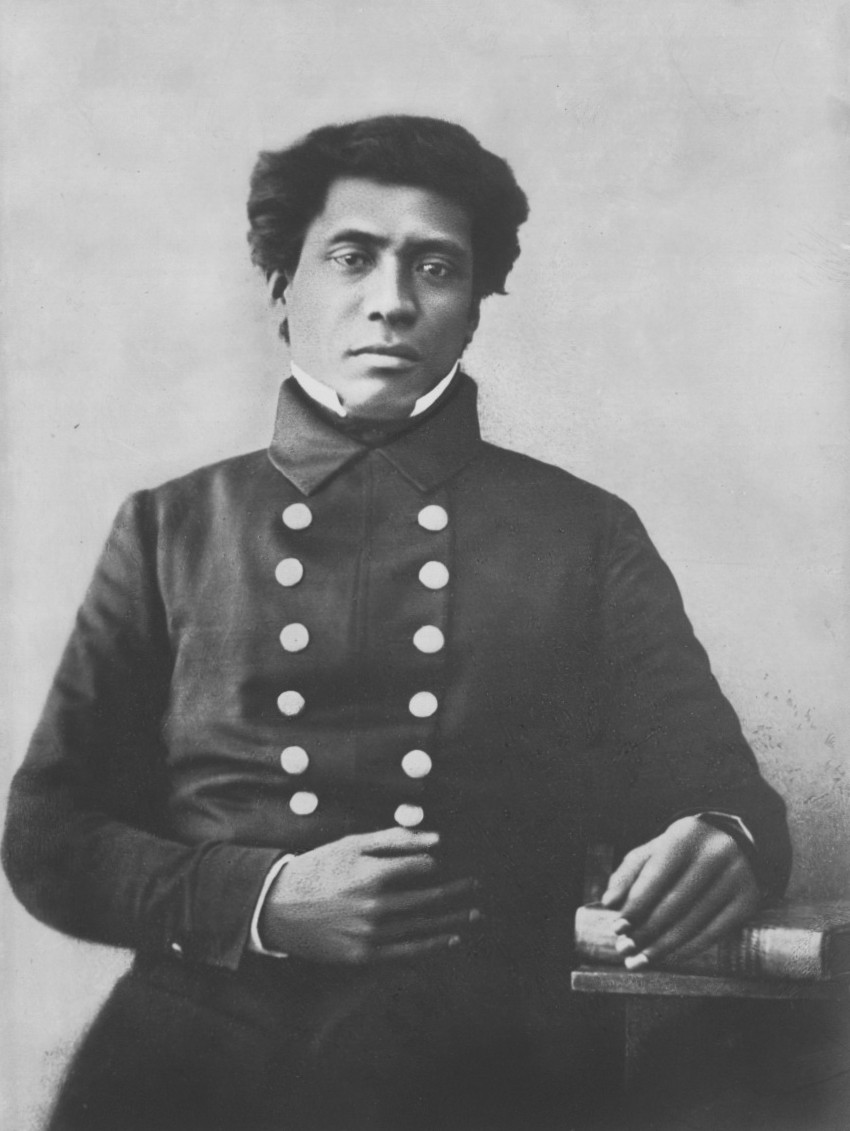
Timoteo Haʻalilio, one of the ambassadors sent by King Kamehameha III.

In 1839, Captain Cyrille Pierre Théodore Laplace of the French frigate Artémise landed in Honolulu in what became known as the Laplace Affair and forced the government of the Hawaiian Islands under His Majesty King Kamehameha III to acknowledge the rights of Catholics in his realm with the Edict of Toleration. The Hawaiian government also had to pay $20,000 in compensation to the French. Anticipating further foreign encroachment on Hawaiian territory following the Laplace Affair, King Kamehameha III dispatched a diplomatic delegation to the United States and Europe to secure the recognition of Hawaiian independence.

Timoteo Haʻalilio, William Richards and Sir George Simpson were commissioned as joint Ministers Plenipotentiary on April 8, 1842. Simpson left for Great Britain while Haʻalilio and Richards went to the United States on July 8, 1842. The Hawaiian delegation secured the assurance of United States President John Tyler of Hawaiian independence on December 19, 1842, and then met Simpson in Europe to secure formal recognition by the United Kingdom and France. Their first meeting with British Secretary of State for Foreign Affairs George Hamilton-Gordon, 4th Earl of Aberdeen, on February 22, 1843, was unsuccessful. Traveling to Brussels and then Paris, the Hawaiian delegation gained the support of King Leopold I of Belgium who was sympathetic and promised to use his influence to help them gain recognition. On March 17, 1843, French foreign minister François Guizot, on behalf of King Louis Philippe I, assured them that the French government would recognize Hawaiian independence. After returning to London, on April 1, 1843, Lord Aberdeen, on behalf of Queen Victoria, assured the Hawaiian delegation, "Her Majesty's Government was willing and had determined to recognize the independence of what was called the Sandwich Islands more formally known as the Hawaiian Islands under their present sovereign."

While the diplomatic party was away, a British naval captain Lord George Paulet, without the authorization of his superiors, unilaterally occupied the kingdom of the Hawaiian Islands in the name of Queen Victoria despite the protests of the Hawaiian government. After a five-month occupation, Rear-Admiral Richard Darton Thomas, the Commander-in-Chief of the Pacific Station, restored sovereignty to Kamehameha III. This event on July 31, 1843, was later commemorated as Sovereignty Restoration Day (Lā Hoʻihoʻi Ea).

On November 28, 1843, at the Court of London, the British and French governments formally recognized the independence of the Kingdom of the Hawaiian Islands in the Anglo-Franco Proclamation, a joint declaration by France and Britain, signed by Lord Aberdeen and the Comte de Saint-Aulaire, representatives of Queen Victoria and King Louis-Philippe, respectively. The United States declined to join in the proclamation stating that in order for such a recognition to be binding, it would require a formal treaty ratified by the United States Senate.

== Historical observance ==
The anniversary of the Anglo-Franco Proclamation on November 28 was subsequently made a public holiday during the Hawaiian monarchy. In 1898, the legislature of the Republic of Hawaii made November 28 Thanksgiving Day. After the annexation of Hawaii to the United States, the holiday lost official recognition.

== Modern-day observance ==
It is still celebrated today by proponents of the Hawaiian sovereignty movement. Attempts have been made to restore it as an official holiday in the state of Hawaii.

== See also ==
- Hawaiian Sovereignty Restoration Day

== Bibliography ==
- Hoʻokahua Staff (November 2014). "Mission Accomplished: International Recognition of Hawaiʻi Achieved in 1843". Kaleinamanu Hawaiian Cultural Center, Kamehameha Schools.
- Kuykendall, Ralph Simpson (1965) [1938]. The Hawaiian Kingdom 1778–1854, Foundation and Transformation. Vol. 1. Honolulu: University of Hawaii Press. ISBN 0-87022-431-X. OCLC 47008868.
- Lauer, Nancy Cook (October 8, 2015). "County Council recognizes Hawaiian Independence Day". Hawaii Tribune-Herald. Hilo.
- Pang, Gordon Y. K. (November 26, 2006). "Group honors Independence Day". The Honolulu Advertiser. Honolulu: Black Press.
- Schmitt, Robert C. (1995). "Holidays in Hawaiʻi". Hawaiian Journal of History. 29. Honolulu: Hawaiian Historical Society: 141–146. hdl:10524/338.
- Severson, Don R.; Horikawa, Michael D.; Saville, Jennifer (2002). Finding Paradise: Island Art in Private Collections. Honolulu: Honolulu Academy of Arts; University of Hawaiʻi Press. ISBN 978-0-8248-2657-4. OCLC 123158782.
- Thrum, Thomas G., ed. (1892). "History of the Provisional Cession of the Hawaiian Islands and Their Restoration". Hawaiian Almanac and Annual for 1893. Honolulu: Honolulu Star-Bulletin. pp. 45–70. hdl:10524/663.
- Thrum, Thomas G., ed. (1898). "The Days We Celebrate; Holidays and Their Observance". Hawaiian Almanac and Annual for 1898. Honolulu: Honolulu Star-Bulletin. pp. 62–69. hdl:10524/23170.
- Thrum, Thomas G., ed. (1909). Hawaiian Holidays. Honolulu: Honolulu Star-Bulletin. pp. 110–116.
- Thrum, Thomas G., ed. (1929). "Holiday Observances In Monarchial Days". Hawaiian Almanac and Annual for 1930. Honolulu: Honolulu Star-Bulletin. pp. 101–106. hdl:10524/32427.
