= Thomas Square =

- U.S. National Register of Historic Places
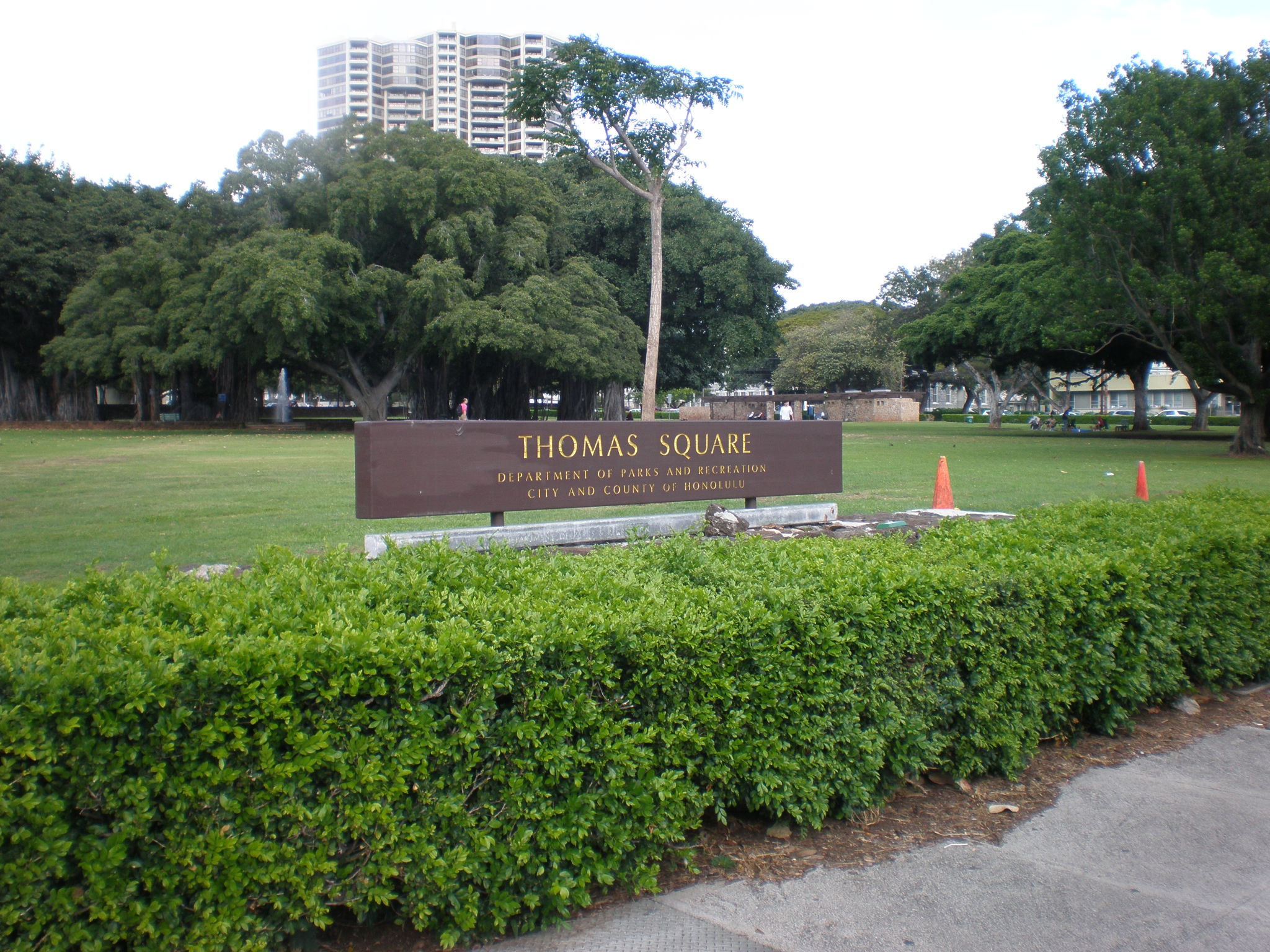

- Location within Hawaii
- Location: Bounded by King, Beretania, and Victoria Streets and Ward Avenue, Honolulu, Hawaii
- Coordinates: 21°18′9″N 157°50′56″W
- Area: 6.5 acres (2.6 ha)
- Built: 1843
- NRHP reference No.: 72000423
- Added to NRHP: April 25, 1972

Thomas Square is a park in Honolulu, Hawaii, named for Admiral Richard Darton Thomas. The Privy Council voted to increase its boundaries on March 8, 1850, making Thomas Square Hawaii's oldest city park. It is one of four sites in Hawaii where the Hawaiian flag is allowed to fly alone without the United States flag.

== Background ==
In February 1843, Lord George Paulet on HMS Carysfort seized and occupied the Kingdom of Hawaii during the Paulet Affair.

On July 26, Admiral Richard Darton Thomas sailed into Honolulu harbor on his flagship HMS Dublin. He became Local Representative of the British Commission by outranking Paulet. His intention was to end the occupation. On July 31, he held the Hawaiian flag in his hands as he officially transferred the islands back to King Kamehameha III, who said the words Ua Mau ke Ea o ka ʻĀina i ka Pono in a speech during a ceremony to mark his restoration. Roughly translated from the Hawaiian language, it means, "The sovereignty of the land is perpetuated in righteousness" and has become Hawaii's state motto, incorporated into the Seal of Hawaii. The British flag set was pulled down and the Hawaiian flag was raised, followed by a series of 21 gun salutes from the Fort, the British ships Carysfort, Dublin, Hazzard, the American ship Constellation, and lastly by guns at the park.

In 1850 Kamehameha III named the place where the ceremony was held in Downtown Honolulu "Thomas Square" in Admiral Thomas's honor and dedicated it as a public park.

== History ==
After the Privy Council demarcated Thomas Square's enlargement on March 8, 1850, the park was still merely a dusty field. A "cheap fence" was installed around 1873. Oats were sown and harvested and algaroba (kiawe) trees were planted soon after 1873, but there was still little shade. It was around this time that the merchant Archibald Scott Cleghorn (husband of Princess Miriam Likelike, father of Princess Kaʻiulani, and brother-in-law of Kalākaua and Liliʻuokalani) began stewarding Thomas Square and Emma Square (Honolulu's only two parks at that point). By 1883, Cleghorn had approved Robert Stirling's park design, which laid out a series of circular and semicircular paths. Since Honolulu's treasury was in "dire condition" at the time, Cleghorn brought banyan trees from ʻĀinahau, his Waikiki estate, to plant and create more shade. He also asked his friends for money to design and build a bandstand, seating, and add more planting. Within several years, the bandstand was designed and installed by F. Wilhelm while more shrubs and trees were planted. The improved park celebrated a successful grand opening on April 7, 1887 where the Royal Hawaiian Band performed to a huge crowd.

In 1925, it was made into a park managed by the City and County of Honolulu.

In the early 1930s, the Parks Boards commissioned and adopted a renovation landscape plan by Catherine J. Richards and Robert O. Thompson. The renovation included a mock orange hedge along the curbs, flower beds bisecting a central walkway, and a terraces and coral wall parallel to Beretania Street. It was during this renovation period in 1932 that The Outdoor Circle donated the central memorial fountain, dedicating it to the late Beatrice Castle Newcomb, who had been the President of the Outdoor Circle from 1922 to 1929.

In 1938, The Daughters of Hawaii unveiled a plaque to commemorate the historic flag-raising event.

In 1942, the US Army built barracks at Thomas Square to quarter troops during World War II. It received $50,000 in 1966 for a renovation that included an expanded comfort station, a new coral walkway from Beretania Street, and tree-pruning to thin out the canopies to allow for more light and air.

It was added to the National Register of Historic Places listings in Oahu on April 25, 1972. It is state historic site 80-14-9990.

In 2011, the sidewalk on the corner of South Beretania Street and Ward Avenue became an encampment site for (De)Occupy Honolulu, a Hawaiʻi affiliate of the Occupy movement. As such, regular protests and police conflicts became a feature of the area until the encampment was permanently cleared.

July 31 is celebrated as Lā Ho'iho'i Ea or Restoration Day holiday. The park's pathways are in the form of the British flag. A fountain is in the center of the square, surrounded by trees. Across the street is the Honolulu Museum of Art.

On July 31, 2018, a 12-foot high bronze sculpture of Kamehameha III by Oregon artist Thomas Jay Warren and a flagpole flying the Hawaiian flag were dedicated at Thomas Square in a ceremony honoring the 175th anniversary of the restoration of Hawaiian sovereignty. Warren was paid $250,000, allotted by the Mayor's Office of Culture and the Arts as part of Mayor Kirk Caldwell’s plans to revamp the park.

Thomas Square is one of four sites in Hawaii where the Hawaiian flag is allowed to fly alone without the United States flag. The others are the Royal Mausoleum at Mauna ʻAla, ʻIolani Palace and Puʻuhonua o Hōnaunau.
