= Henry Byam Martin =

Royal Navy Admiral and painter (1803–1865)

Admiral Sir Henry Byam Martin KCB
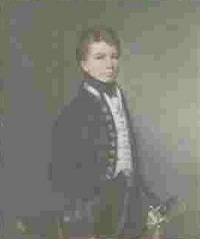
- Sir Henry Byam Martin
- Born: 25 June 1803; Plymouth, Devon, England
- Died: 9 February 1865 (aged 61); Genoa
- Military career
- Allegiance: United Kingdom
- Branch: Royal Navy
- Service years: 1818 - 1865
- Rank: Admiral
- Awards: KCB

Sir Henry Byam Martin KCB (25 June 1803 – 9 February 1865) was a senior Royal Navy officer, and a watercolour artist.

== Naval career ==
Martin was born in 1803, the second son of Admiral of the Fleet Sir Thomas Byam Martin, comptroller of the navy (1815–1831). Educated at the Royal Naval Academy, Martin first went to sea in October 1818. By 1840 he was captain of HMS Carysfort off the coast of Syria during the Egyptian–Ottoman War. Martin took part in actions off Tartus, and the capture of Acre on 3 November 1840. His actions earned him an appointment as a Commander of the Order of the Bath.

From 1846 to 1847, in command of HMS Grampus, Martin was sent to the Society Islands in the South Pacific to report on the Franco-Tahitian War and investigate the sovereignty claim of Queen Pōmare IV over the Leeward Islands.

Martin was promoted to Rear-Admiral in 1854 and was appointed as a Knight Commander of the Order of the Bath for his work during Crimean War in 1855.

== Artist ==
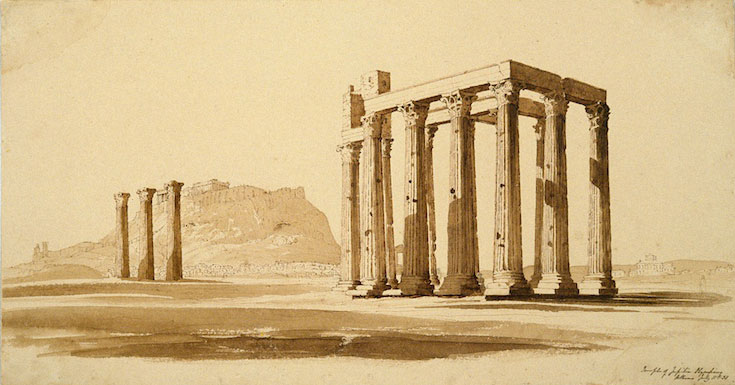
Temple of Jupiter Olympus, Athens, 11 July 1835

During his travels with the Navy Martin sketched and painted what he had seen.

== Family ==
His elder brother William Martin also became a senior naval commander.
