= William Richards (missionary) =

American missionary and politician

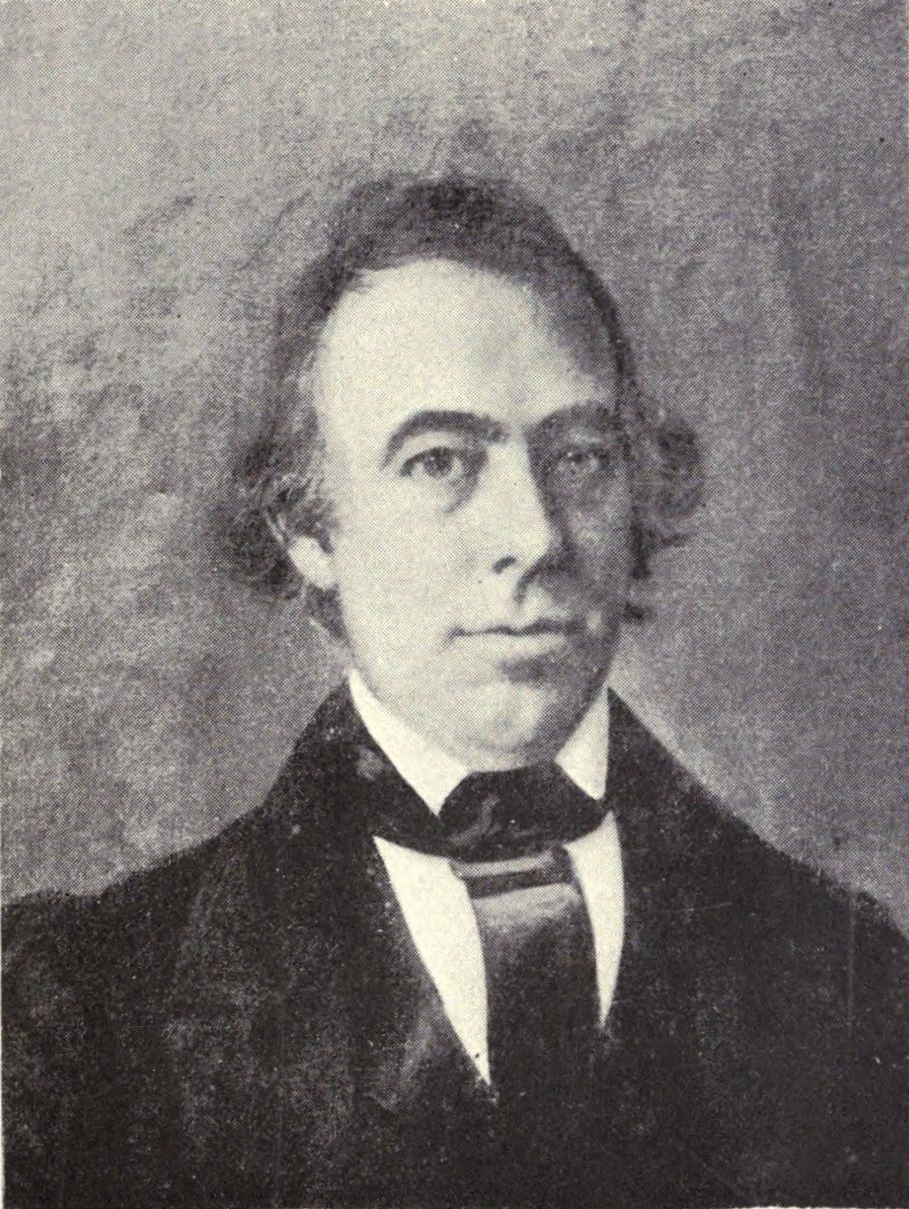
- Born: August 22, 1793; Plainfield, Massachusetts
- Died: November 7, 1847 (aged 54); Honolulu, Kingdom of Hawaii
- Occupations: Missionary, Diplomat
- Spouse: Clarissa Lyman
- Children: 8
- Parent(s): James Richards; Lydia Shaw

William Richards (August 22, 1793 – November 7, 1847) was a missionary and politician in the Kingdom of Hawaii.

== Family life ==
William Richards was born in Plainfield, Massachusetts, on August 22, 1793. His father was James Richards and mother was Lydia Shaw. He was schooled under Moses Hallock in Plainfield, attended Williams College 1815 through graduation in 1819 and Andover Seminary. His brother James had also gone to Williams College and became a missionary. He was ordained September 12, 1822. He married Clarissa Lyman (1794–1861) on October 30, 1822. Her distant cousin David Belden Lyman would also come to Hawaii to serve as a missionary 9 years later.

== Missionary ==
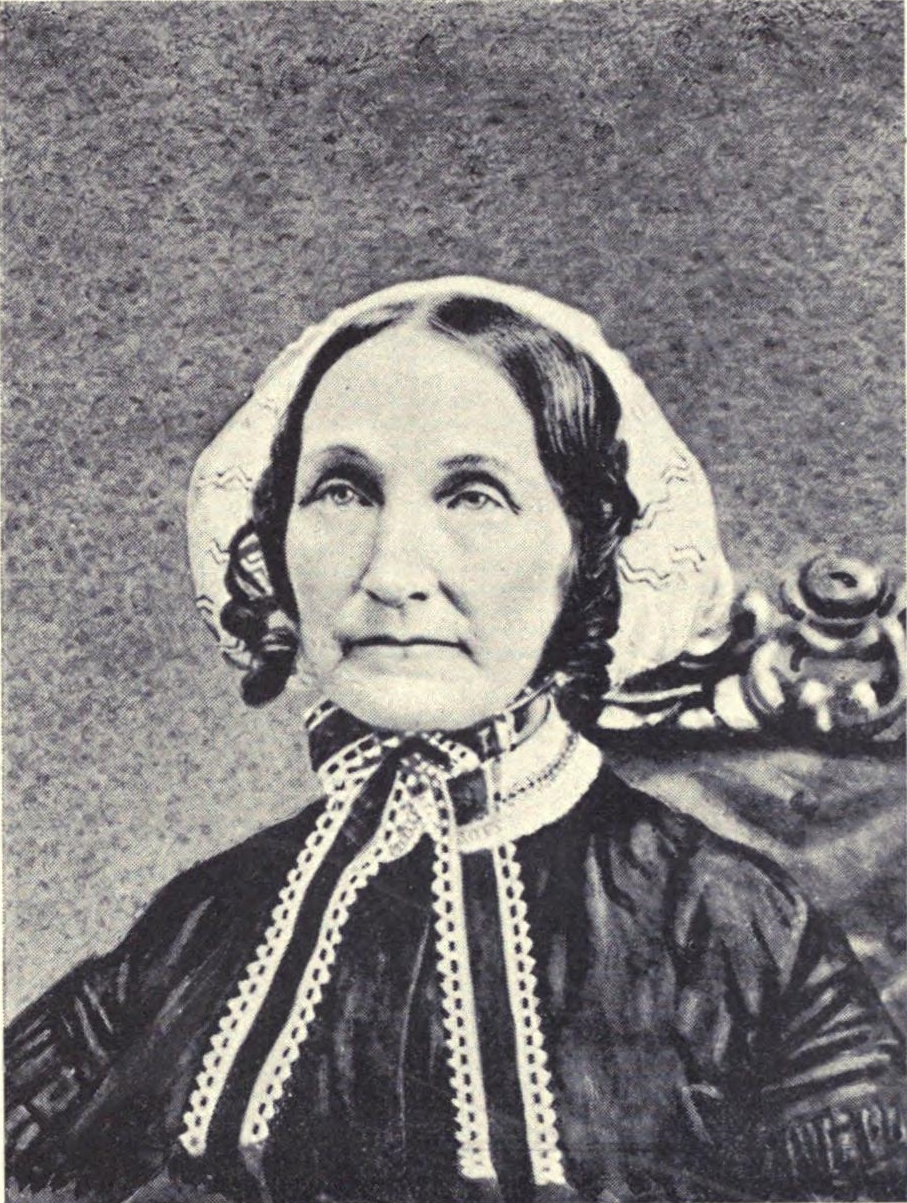
Clarissa Lyman Richards (1794-1861)

They sailed on November 19, 1822, on the ship Thames under Captain Clasby from New Haven, Connecticut, in the second company from the American Board of Commissioners for Foreign Missions to Hawaii. They arrived to the Hawaiian Islands April 24, 1823, and landed in Honolulu April 27.

On May 28, 1823, he and shipmate Charles Stewart sailed on the Royal Yacht Cleopatra's Barge to Lahaina and on May 31 founded the mission in on Maui inside thatched huts. However, he did not speak the Hawaiian language fluently enough for people to understand his sermons. In September Queen Mother Keōpūolani became ill and requested Baptism, but the missionaries wanted to make sure she fully understood the ceremony. English missionary William Ellis had just arrived with Tahitian interpreters, and the language was similar enough that they were used for the baptism just before the Queen Mother's death. In December 1823, the young King Kamehameha II sailed to England in an attempted state visit, and the government was left in the hands of Queen Regent Kaʻahumanu and Prime Minister Kalanimoku who were both accommodating to the mission.

By January 1824, the Richardses and Stewarts moved back to Honolulu and set up a school with the families there that went both ways: the Americans were taught Hawaiian while Hawaiians (at least the chiefs) were taught English. A standardized orthography was developed and some simple texts were printed.

In 1825, Richards published a biography of Queen Keōpūolani. Some time in 1825, the Richardses moved back to Maui to establish a mission. Whaling ships had been visiting the port, expecting women to greet the ship and offer themselves to the sailors. In October 1825 the crew of the British whaleship Daniel threatened Richards in front of his wife and children unless they relaxed restrictions on the town. Tensions escalated, and the ship's master William Buckle refused a request to control his crew.

In January 1826, the American schooner USS Dolphin arrived in Honolulu and demanded the release of four women who were accused of prostitution, since there were no written laws. The crew attacked the house of the Prime Minister and the missionaries. Later in 1826 another mob damaged the town of Lahaina, although Richards and his family escaped. In 1827 the English whaler John Palmer fired cannon shots over the mission house after its captain Elisha Clarke was arrested for taking four women on board. Richards negotiated the release of Clarke if the women were returned, but the captain sailed off with them.

Near the end of 1827, word got back to the islands that the 1825 incident with William Buckle had found its way into American newspapers. The papers accused the captain of purchasing a woman for 10 doubloons and taking her on board his vessel, what would now be called human trafficking. British Consul Richard Charlton demanded that Richards be arrested and taken for a libel trial in Honolulu. The story had probably been sensationalized along the way, and many agreed that these were inflammatory charges with only hearsay evidence. On November 26, 1827, with Queen Regent Kaʻahumanu presiding, Richards was released. Buckle pointed out that the woman named Leoiki had come willingly, and they were now officially married. There were precedents at the time for English of high rank and Americans to marry Hawaiian noble women. For example, the respected John Young had taken a Hawaiian bride much earlier.

In 1828, Maui island Governor Hoapili supported the building of a stone and wood structure for Richards' church. The Christian church was built adjacent to a pond surrounding an island called Mokuʻula, which had been a sacred to the Hawaiian religion. The first stone building was dedicated on March 4, 1832, and called Waineʻe Church.

When the USS Vincennes arrived in 1829 Richards received a visit from its ship chaplain, his former colleague Charles Stewart who now worked for the Navy. He would host officers of the Vincennes again later during the United States Exploring Expedition with Richards serving as interpreter for the King. Richards wrote a long letter to Charles Wilkes, the commander of the expedition describing aspects of the Hawaiian culture that has proven valuable to historians.

In June 1831, he and Lorrin Andrews were assigned to investigate opening a school on Maui. The land above the town was donated by Hoapili and called Lahainaluna School, with Andrews as first principal. In 1836 Dwight Baldwin was assigned to the Waineʻe Church as the Richards family planned to travel back to the United States.

After leaving their children to attend American schools, he and his wife returned March 27, 1838. In July 1838 he resigned from the mission to become government translator to king Kamehameha III, but continued to help the mission by translating much of the Bible into Hawaiian.

== Legal reform ==
The king had asked Richards to send back an American lawyer to help the Kingdom of Hawaii draft a set of formal laws. The mission board, already accused of political meddling, did not think it appropriate to support the effort. Since he could not find any willing to take such a long journey, Richards himself took on the task. He helped draft a Hawaiian Declaration of Rights with assistance from Boaz Mahune, Jonah Kapena and other students at Lahainaluna. After several round of changes by the king and his councilors, it was published June 7, 1839. The declaration was meant to secure property rights for all people. Before then, land could be taken by the king whenever he pleased. However, land could still not be owned in the fee simple sense; it was always leased. This became more important as the business of sugarcane cultivation for shipment abroad arose.

Next the councilors and king formalized the system of government for the first time in the 1840 Constitution of the Kingdom of Hawaii. Richards served as secretary during the proceedings. In 1842, he published the constitution and laws up to that point.

Richards met Sir George Simpson of the Hudson's Bay Company while Sir George was traveling from the Northwest Territories through Hawaii in February 1842. Sir George had heard from his cousin Alexander Simpson that Charlton argued that Britain should just annex the islands to counter the American domination of the government. Sir George instead favored Hawaiian independence, having seen the advantages of free trade in Canada.

== Diplomat ==
April 8, 1842, Richards was appointed special envoy to U.S. and Great Britain with native Hawaiian Timothy Haʻalilio. Richards had sent a proposed treaty to the U.S. Attorney General Benjamin Butler in 1838, but the letter was quietly filed away. Missionary doctor Gerrit P. Judd replaced Richards as government translator, and continued the American influence on Hawaiian government. Judd resigned from the mission and also became the first Finance minister, effectively one of the most powerful positions in the kingdom.

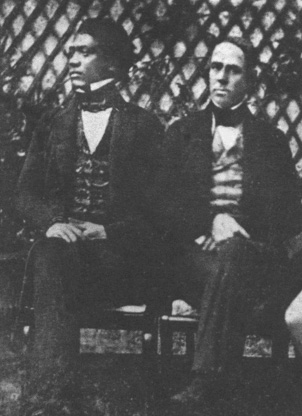
Haʻalilio and Richards on diplomatic mission

The envoys left on July 18, 1842, arriving in Washington, D.C. December 5. Richards looked up his former congressman Caleb Cushing. After a week waiting to see Daniel Webster who was the U.S. Secretary of State, they had their appointment on December 7. Webster had not even read their letter. When Richards mentioned they would renew their status as a British Protectorate, Webster indicated it was President John Tyler's policy to prevent any restrictions of U.S. control in the Pacific, but did not promise anything specific.

Meanwhile, Richard Charlton had left Hawaii to return to London, appointing Alexander Simpson to take his place. Charlton had met with officers of the British Pacific fleet in Mexico, where he reported that French and Americans were going to take over the islands unless the British acted soon.

Richards and Haʻalilio then went to London and requested a visit with Lord Aberdeen who was British Secretary of State for Foreign Affairs. In February 1843 Richards, Sir George Simpson and Haʻalilio visited King Leopold I of Belgium. The American Consul to Hawaii, Peter A. Brinsmade, had negotiated a contract for Belgian colonization of Hawaii. On March 17, 1843, they met François Guizot who was the French Foreign Minister. Both verbally accepted Hawaiian independence, and so did Lord Aberdeen on another visit on March 25. Confident in their success, Sir George Simpson returned to Canada, thinking Richards and Haʻalilo could wrap up the details through April and May 1843.

Richards got his first hint of trouble reading a Paris newspaper account of how a British frigate HMS Carysfort, under the command of Lord George Paulet, captured the Hawaiian islands after threatening a military attack the previous February.

Using a coffin in the Royal mausoleum as a desk, Judd prepared letters for Richards and Haʻalilio, secretly sending them out with American merchant James F.B. Marshall. Marshall spread the news in the American press, and met June 4 with fellow Bostonians such as Daniel Webster and Henry A. Peirce (business partner and future minister to Hawaii). Webster gave him letters for Edward Everett who was the American minister to Great Britain.

On June 30, 1843, Marshall arrived with the letters of Judd, while Richards and Haʻalilo were in Paris. Seven days earlier Alexander Simpson had arrived with letters presenting Paulet's case at the British the Foreign office. Paulet claimed that the islands were voluntarily ceded. This confused and embarrassed the British government.

The British agreed to restore the flag, but continued to negotiate the terms. Meanwhile, Admiral Richard Darton Thomas had already sailed to Honolulu and held a ceremony on July 31 turning the country back to Kamehameha III. Finally on November 13, 1843, Lord Aberdeen and the French ambassador Louis Saint-Aulaire agreed on terms and signed an agreement on November 28. It was a joint declaration, not a treaty, so did not clarify status. Charlton was fired and William Miller (1795–1861) was appointed the new British consul to investigate Charlton's land claims.

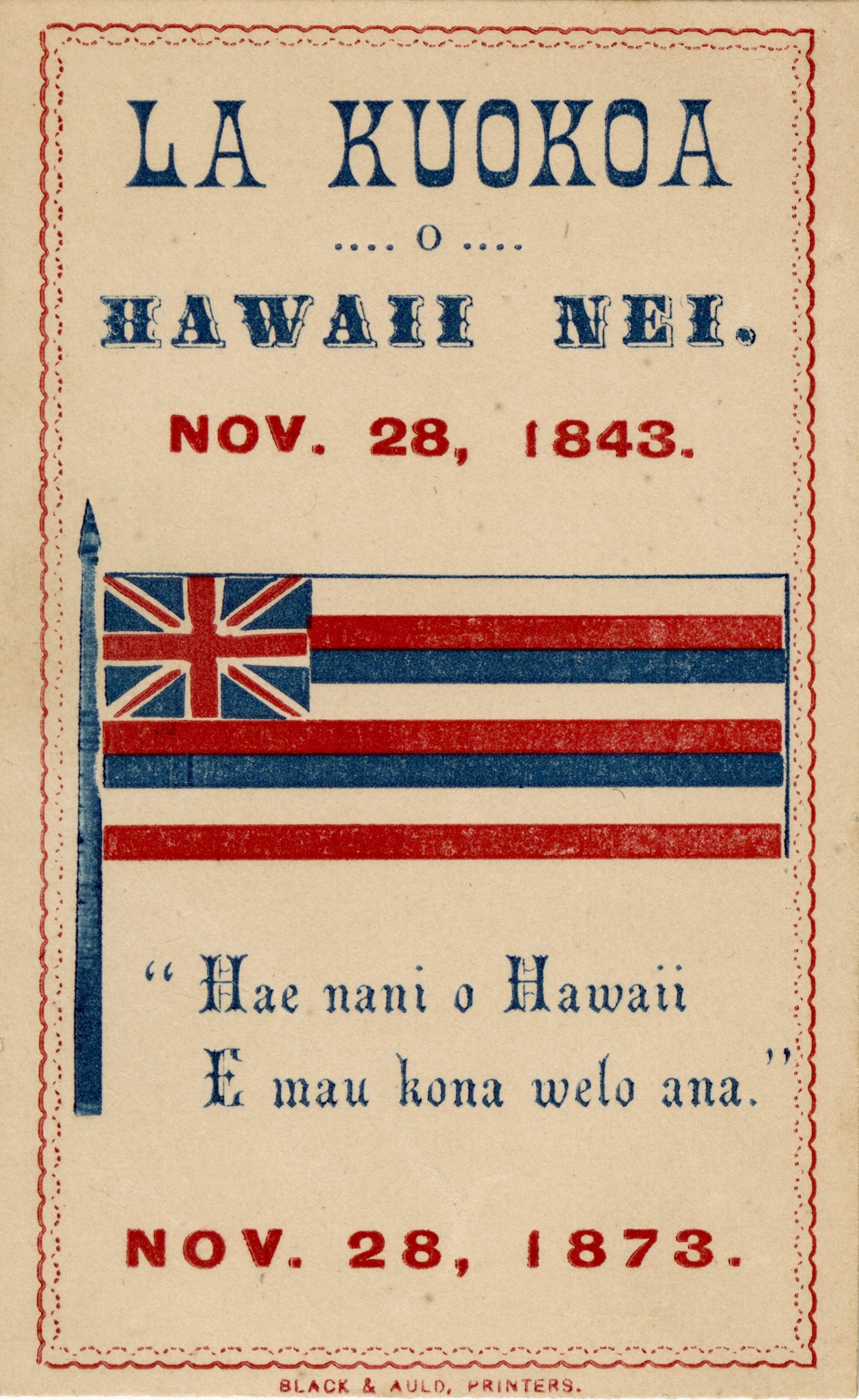
Flier for 30th anniversary celebration of the 1843 treaty

When news of the treaty got back to the islands, November 28 became a holiday known as Lā Kūʻokoʻa o Hawaiʻi Nei ("beloved Hawaii independence day").

On their way back, the new American Secretary of State John C. Calhoun was invited to also sign the agreement, but said he would wait for a treaty that could be ratified by the Senate. The USA appointed a diplomatic commissioner in 1843, but would not officially recognize the Kingdom until 1849. Timothy Haʻalilio's health declined, and he died December 3, 1844, trying to return home. Although earlier Richards made it clear he only an advisor and secretary, he was now be making policy decisions.

On his return in 1845, Richards was appointed to the king's Privy Council and a two-year term in the House of Nobles; a new law required government workers to officially become citizens of the kingdom. In February 1846 he became president of the commission to reform land titles. On April 13, 1846, he became the kingdom's first Minister of Public Instruction. Although previously all schools had been strictly Protestant, he took one step to religious freedom by working with Catholics to accommodate them in public schools.

== Death and legacy ==
Richards became ill in July 1847, and died in Honolulu on November 7, 1847. He was buried at Waineʻe Church among the graves of Hawaiian royalty. His work on a formal land title system was to result in the Great Mahele in 1848. His wife moved back to New Haven in November 1849 and died October 3, 1861. They had 8 children. Daughter Harriet Keopuolani Richards married William S. Clark. She and son Levi Lyman Richards had been sent to live with Samuel Williston (1795–1874) in Massachusetts for their education at his Williston School. After Richards' death they were adopted by the Willistons and took the Williston name. Levi Lyman's son Samuel Williston (1861–1963) became a law professor at Harvard Law School. In 1850, a street in downtown Honolulu was named for him at 21°18′25″N 157°51′36″W. A namesake was William Richards Castle (1849–1935).

== See also ==
- Betsey Stockton
- List of bilateral treaties signed by the Kingdom of Hawaii
- Relations between the Kingdom of Hawaii and the United States
