= Richard Charlton =

British diplomat to Hawaii in the 1800s

- Born: 1791; Cornwall
- Died: 31 December 1852; Falmouth, Cornwall
- Occupations: Seaman, diplomat
- Spouse: Betsy Bastram
- Parent(s): Robert Charlton; Christian

Richard Charlton (1791–1852) was the first diplomatic Consul from Great Britain to the Kingdom of Hawaii (1825–1843). He was surrounded by controversies that caused a military occupation known as the Paulet Affair, and real estate claims that motivated the formalization of Hawaiian land titles.

== Life ==
Richard Charlton was born in St Anthony in Roseland, Cornwall in December 1791. His father was Robert Charlton and mother Christian Charlton. He married Betsy Bastram of Bristol in 1818.

He worked for the East India Company in the Pacific as early as 1821, starting as cabin boy to command his own vessel. Charlton knew King Kamehameha II during his early trading visits to the Hawaiian Islands. For example, Charlton commanded the schooner Active which arrived on 4 February 1823 from Tahiti with English missionary Rev. William Ellis, and was generally well received.

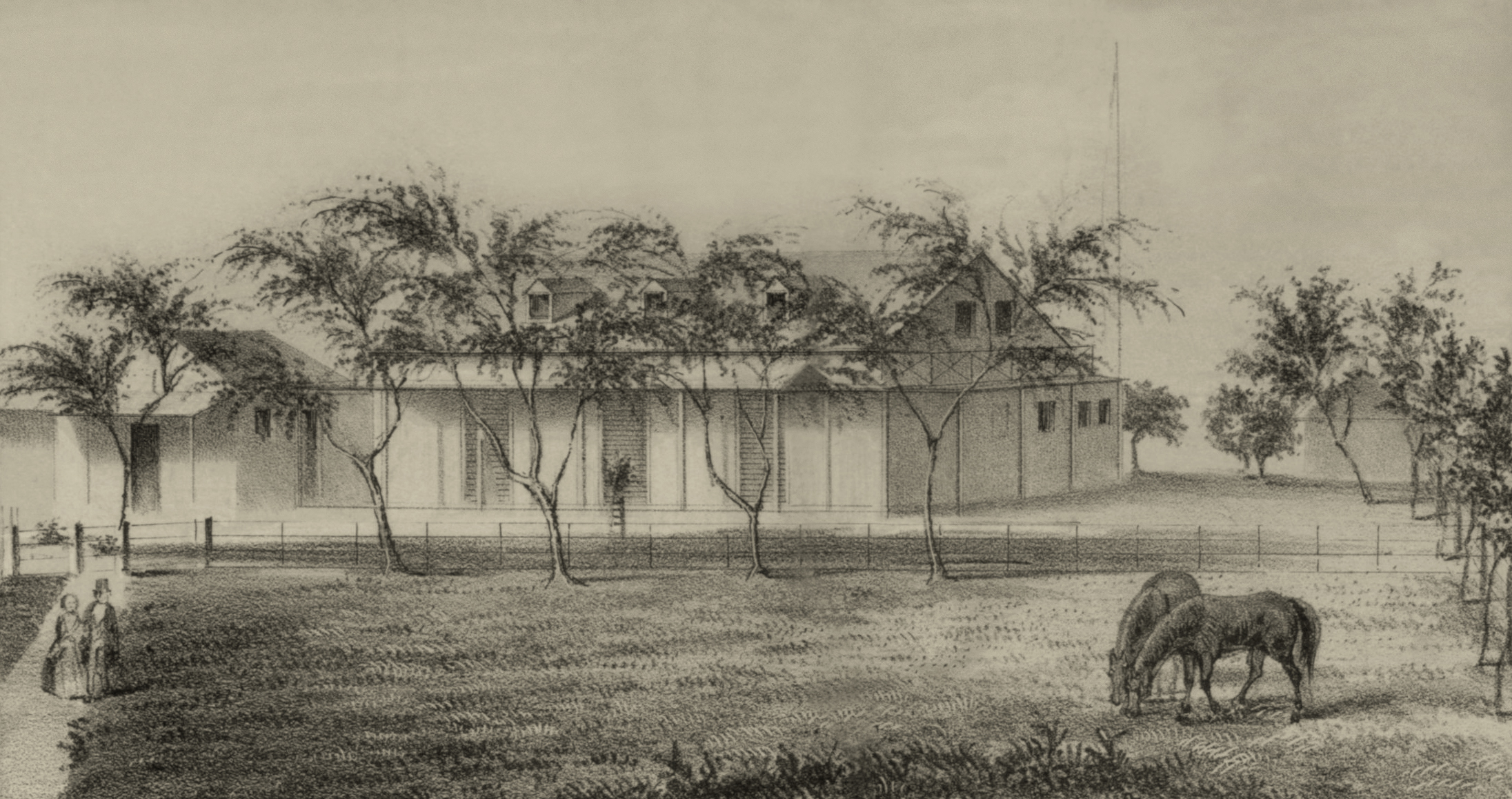
Residence of the British Consul in Honolulu. This would later become the home of his successor William Miller.

Kamehameha II and his Queen Kamāmalu died in 1824 while in London trying to see the King of Great Britain. George Canning who was British Foreign Secretary was deeply embarrassed by the deaths, and wanted to formalize relations. The United States had appointed John Coffin Jones as an unpaid Consular Agent in 1820. In July 1824 Charlton had just returned from the Pacific, and was recommended to become the first British representative in residence there. While en route, he was officially appointed British Consul (trade representative) for the Hawaiian, Friendly (now Tonga) and Society Islands on 23 September 1824.

He took his wife Betsy, her sister, and a daughter Elizabeth on his ship Active which reached the Hawaiian Islands on 25 April 1825, from Valparaíso. HMS Blonde, a specially fitted warship with hand-picked crew was sent bearing the royal bodies. After Blonde arrived two weeks later, Charlton took part in the elaborate state funeral put on by the military crew. The Anglican ship chaplain led the funeral service, which started a lingering conflict with Hiram Bingham I, the conservative American missionary leader from the Congregational church.

== Friction ==
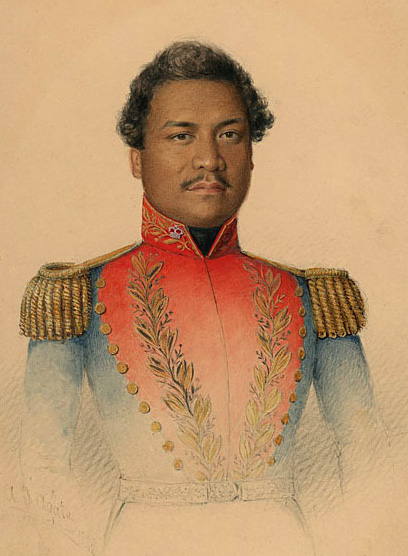
King Kamehameha III

Charlton and George Byron, 7th Baron Byron who commanded Blonde, addressed the Hawaiian leaders assembled for the funeral, encouraging them to adopt a more formal set of written laws. However, a lack of any trained legal professionals would cause this to be a slow and contentious process.

Charlton brought a letter from former royal secretary Jean Baptiste Rives indicating Hawaiian Prime Minister Kalanimoku should grant land for the consulate site. Beretania Street, 21°18′42″N 157°51′35″W in Downtown Honolulu still bears its name: a variant spelling of Britain. With the Spaniard Francisco de Paula Marin as witness, Kalanimoku granted a 299-year lease on some valuable harbor-front land.

Charlton toured the islands with the new young King Kamehameha III, entertaining both Hawaiian royalty and visiting foreign guests at his several island estates. Charlton partnered with island governor Boki who had seen the vibrant British economy firsthand while accompanying Kamehameha II on the 1824 visit. Boki was happy to profit as he could, even from vices considered sinful by the American missionaries. Boki sailed off on one of his business ventures and was lost at sea.

Conflicts continued with American missionaries. In 1825 Charlton heard about reports in American newspapers quoting Maui missionary Reverend William Richards accusing William Buckle, the British skipper of the whaling ship Daniel IV, of human trafficking by buying a woman. By then Buckle and the woman were legally married. Charlton insisted that Richards be sent to England and charged with libel. Instead, the powerful Queen Regent Kaʻahumanu declared Richards innocent. In 1831 Catholic priests including Patrick Short and some Frenchmen were expelled at the insistence of Bingham. Charlton's protest were ignored by Kaʻahumanu who followed Bingham's puritanical Protestant teachings.

Coffee trees and other crops had been brought by Blonde, and Charlton made an unsuccessful attempt to make growing them into a business. He also built a wharf on his land and started a shipping business. However, the sandalwood trade declined, while crops such as sugarcane grew in importance. The sugar business was dominated by American companies such as that Ladd & Co. and Charles Brewer.

In 1836, Charlton requested HMS Actaeon sent under command of Lord Edward Russell to secure the release of two British prisoners. Russell also insisted on religious freedom. In 1837 Edward Belcher of HMS Sulphur brought Catholic priests to open a parish for the first time.

In 1837 a separate consular post was established for Tahiti and the Society Islands by former British missionary George Pritchard. The French had expelled Protestant missionaries in Tahiti, and Charlton wrote to suggest British warships could do the same with the Americans in Hawaii. In 1838 Charlton helped establish the Oahu Charity School with Stephen Reynolds. The school offered a liberal education including dance, which the conservatives thought was sinful. In the 1839 First Opium War the Chinese rebelled against the monopoly of the English East India Company. This further disrupted the sandalwood trade.

In 1840 Charlton decided to formalize his claim for the area known as Pulaholaho near the Honolulu Harbor. Charlton had built a wharf in 1838 at 21°18′34″N 157°51′52″W. Charlton claimed additional nearby land, even some that had been used by long-time residents. By this time, the signers and witnesses of the lease (Kalanimoku, Marin, and Boki) were dead. The kingdom ruled the lease invalid since by tradition the land belonged to Kaʻahumanu, not Kalanimoku.

Sir George Simpson of the Hudson's Bay Company (HBC) arrived in February 1842. Sir George was in favor of promoting free trade by keeping Hawaii independent. Alexander Simpson (Sir George's cousin) had also been working for HBC. Alexander blamed Sir George for the death of Alexander's brother Thomas Simpson (1808–1840). Alexander aligned himself with Charlton, arguing for a full British annexation, putting him on a collision course with Sir George.

About this time Charlton alienated another fellow Briton: the HBC agent since 1834 in Honolulu, George Pelly, who was cousin of HBC Governor John Henry Pelly. Charlton had advanced a loan for goods to be sold in Honolulu; Pelly was trying to recover the money for his client. In another case, Charlton had sold some of the waterfront land to Francis John Greenway with American William French acting as agent. Greenway later was declared bankrupt, so Charlton took the land back and sold it again to Briton Henry Skinner. Skinner also had a claim against Captain John Dominis (father of John Owen Dominis). These disputes dragged on for years.

== Paulet ==
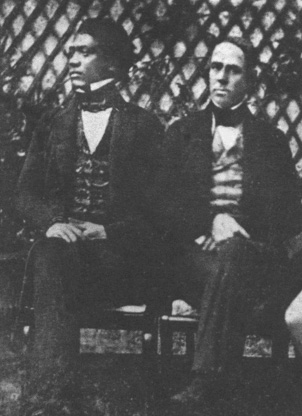
Haʻalilio and Richards on diplomatic mission

Charlton left for London in September 1842 to present his grievances in person before the British Foreign Office. He appointed Alexander Simpson as his successor, but this was not recognized by either government. While he was gone, several of his trials went to court with juries of Americans, generally reaching verdicts against him. While en route he met with Lord George Paulet who took military control of the kingdom in what is known as the Paulet Affair in February 1843. In May Betsy Charlton had Paulet order the destruction of 23 homes with 156 residents in Pulaholaho. She also convinced Paulet to prevent collecting any damages from Charlton's court cases.

== Lingering claims ==
Timothy Haʻalilio had been sent to England with Richards to present their side of the story. In London Charlton was fired for leaving his post without permission, and Lord Aberdeen recognized Hawaiian independence. William Miller was appointed the new Consul, at a slightly higher diplomatic rank. Miller had served as a General in the Latin American wars of independence with Simón Bolívar. Robert Crichton Wyllie came along when they arrived in February 1844. Charlton returned to Honolulu in May 1844 thinking that Miller would easily force the disputed land to be given to him. Wyllie served briefly as acting British Consul while Miller traveled through the Pacific, and then became a cabinet minister of the Kingdom of Hawaii for the rest of his career.

On his return, Pelly accused Charlton of slander for accusations of sodomy. Charlton was found guilty and fined in June 1844, but continued to appeal the case. Experienced frontier lawyer John Ricord had just arrived, and served as the first Western-style Attorney General for the Kingdom. Miller was presented with enormous volumes of testimony presenting the issues of the Charlton land claim. Surrounded by commercial wharves, the Pulaholaho beach was the only public boat landing left in Honolulu. Miller insisted the land was Charlton's, but did not fully trust him, so insisted on a third party to agree on the border. On 23 August 1845 with Thomas Charles Byde Rooke as witness, Charlton fenced off the land and put it up for sale. In November he sold it to Robert C. Janion of the company that would become Theo H. Davies & Co.; Janion subdivided and sold the valuable lots by the next year.

On 19 February 1846 Charlton left quietly with his wife and children to retire in England. Pelly on his departure called him a "liar, Slanderer, and Contemptible Coward."

He died on 31 December 1852 in Falmouth.

The land claim case made it clear a formal land title system was needed. A Board of Commissioners to Quiet Land Titles was formed, with Richards elected president. This led to what would be known as the Great Mahele, legalizing the fee simple ownership of land by foreigners for the first time in Hawaii's history.

Diplomatic posts
New post	British Consul to Kingdom of Hawaii; 1824–1842	Succeeded by William Miller
