= Lord George Paulet =

British admiral (1803–1879)

Admiral Lord George Paulet CB
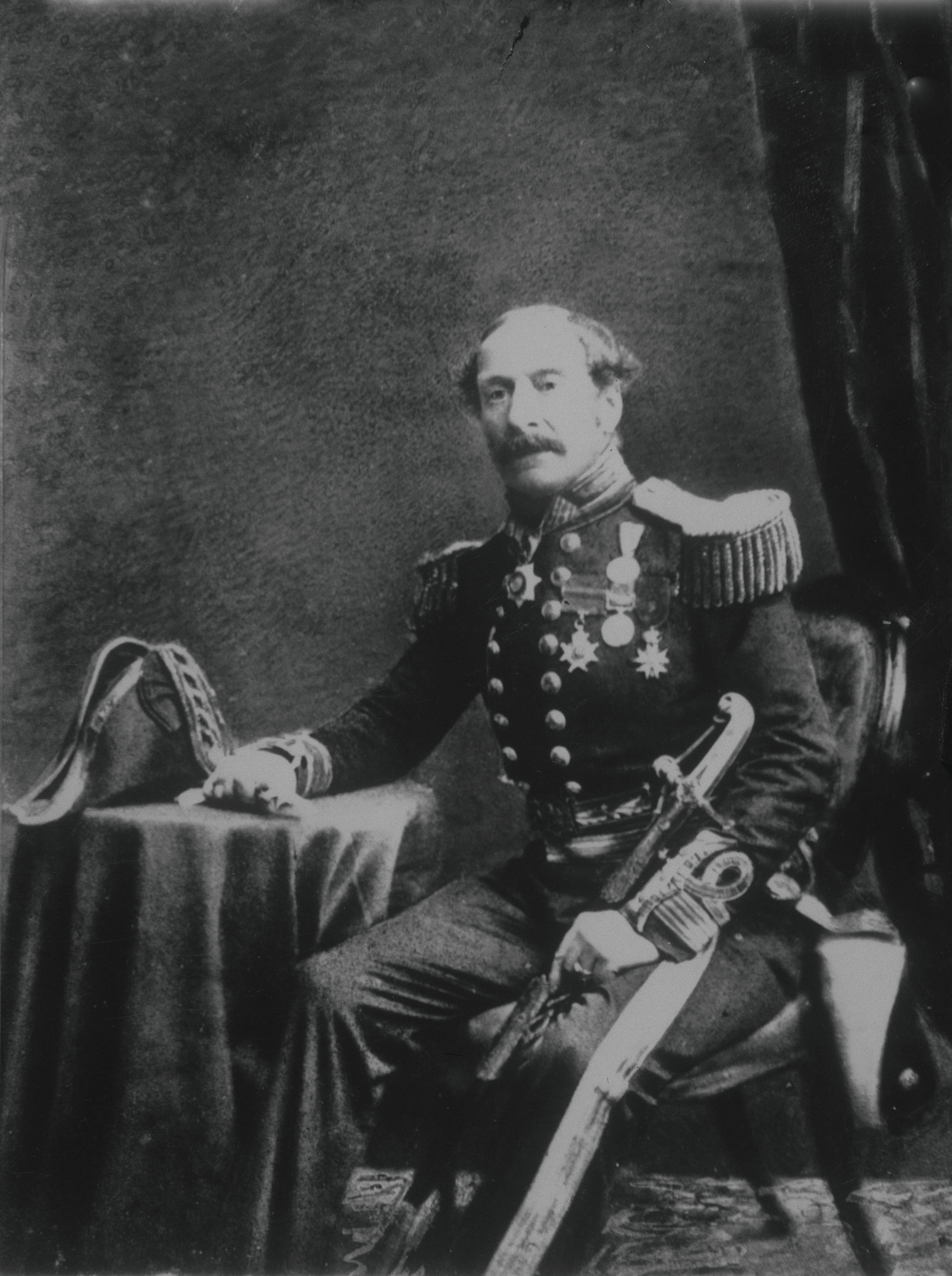
- Born: 12 August 1803
- Died: 22 November 1879 (aged 76)
- Relatives: Henry Paulet (uncle)
- Military career
- Branch: Royal Navy
- Service years: 1817–1867
- Rank: Admiral
- Commands: HMS Nautilus; HMS Carysfort; HMS Bellerophon
- Conflicts: Crimean War
- Awards: Companion of the Order of the Bath; Officier of the Légion d'honneur Medjidie of the Third Class

Lord George Paulet CB (12 August 1803 – 22 November 1879) was a British officer of the Royal Navy.

He entered the navy shortly after the end of the Napoleonic Wars and after some years obtained his own command. He served off the Iberian Peninsula during the Portuguese Liberal Wars and the Spanish First Carlist War. While serving on the Pacific Station he obtained a brief measure of infamy when he occupied the Hawaiian Islands for five months in 1843, in an incident known as the Paulet affair. The occupation was later reversed by his commanding officer. Paulet went on to serve during the Crimean War, commanding a ship during the heavy fighting around the siege of Sevastopol in 1854 and the Battle of Kinburn in 1855. He received a number of awards after the war, and was promoted through the ranks, until his death in 1879 at the rank of full admiral.

== Family and early life ==
George Paulet was born on 12 August 1803, the third son of Charles Ingoldsby Paulet, 13th Marquess of Winchester, and his wife, Anne Andrews. He joined the Royal Navy on 6 February 1817 and after several years of service was commissioned a lieutenant on 9 February 1825. He was promoted to commander on 28 February 1828, and was given command of HMS Nautilus in March 1830. He was assigned to the Lisbon station, where he spent the rest of the Portuguese Civil War, based in and off the Douro and Tagus rivers. Nautilus was later moved to the northern Spanish coast after the outbreak of the First Carlist War. During her time in Portugal Nautilus was visited by Sir Charles Shaw, who remarked on the great respect that the Spanish had for Paulet, and also commented on how his men were 'so comfortably clad, so well fed, so respectful, and so attached to their officers.' Paulet was promoted to post-captain on 18 November 1833. He went to Bilbao on 17 December to render assistance and protect British property, but bad weather delayed his entry to the port. From Bilbao he proceeded to London to deliver despatches, after which he sailed to Portsmouth to pay off Nautilus, on which occasion he gave his officers 'a sumptuous entertainment'.

He married Georgina Wood of Surrey, daughter of Major-General Sir George Wood on 11 July 1835. In 1843 took a second wife in Hawaii, Kamamalu-o-Leleihoku, and had a child the same year born Hanakaʻulani-o-Kamamalu.

== Paulet affair ==
Paulet became captain of HMS Carysfort on 28 December 1841, and served on the Pacific Station under Rear-Admiral Richard Darton Thomas. In late 1842, Richard Charlton, the British consul to the Kingdom of Hawaii told Paulet that British subjects in the Hawaiian Islands were being denied their legal rights. Paulet requested permission from Rear-Admiral Thomas to investigate the allegations. Paulet arrived at Honolulu on 11 February 1843 but was unable to meet immediately with King Kamehameha III. Paulet refused to use an intermediary, the chief government minister American Gerrit P. Judd, and warned Captain Long of an American ship, USS Boston, on 17 February, that he would attack the town were his demands not met. The Hawaiian government acceded to his demands on 18 February and an agreement was signed on 25 February which ceded the land subject to any diplomatic resolution. Paulet appointed himself and three others to a commission to be the new government, and insisted on direct control of land transactions.

Paulet destroyed all Hawaiian flags he could find, and raised the British Union Flag during the occupation. He cleared 156 residents off contested land. Both Paulet and Judd despatched envoys to London to present their cases, Paulet to explain his actions and Judd to press for an independent Hawaii. While discussions were held in London, the American warships USS Constellation under Commodore Lawrence Kearny and USS United States under Commodore Thomas ap Catesby Jones arrived in the islands and consulted with American and Hawaiian representatives. Rear-Admiral Thomas received word of the developments, and sailed to Hawaii himself on his flagship HMS Dublin. On 26 July Thomas arrived in Honolulu harbour and met with King Kamehameha III. After investigating, Thomas declared on 31 July that the occupation was over and while he reserved the right to protect British citizens, Hawaiian sovereignty was to be respected.

== Crimean War and later life ==
In June 1845 Paulet was no longer captain of Carysfort. He was appointed to command HMS Bellerophon on 7 November 1850 in the Mediterranean. He fought during the Crimean War, seeing action at the siege of Sevastopol. During the bombardment of the Konstantin Battery on 17 October 1854 Paulet took Bellerophon in close to support the damaged HMS Agamemnon. Bellerophon was hit several times, a shot smashing her wheel, and another setting her on fire. Paulet continued to stand in to the attack, until his ship was hit by raking fire. Her launch was hit and sunk, and she again caught fire. After signalling for assistance HMS Spitfire came to her aid, and Bellerophon was towed out of the line, on fire and with four of her crew dead and 15 wounded.

Paulet was made a naval aide de camp to Queen Victoria in 1854, and was made a Companion of the Order of the Bath in 1855. For his services during the war he was also authorised to accept appointments as an Officier of the Légion d'honneur and as a Medjidie of the Third Class. He was promoted to rear-admiral on 21 July 1856, vice-admiral on 3 April 1863 and a full admiral on 20 March 1866. He retired on 12 March 1867 and died on 22 November 1879.
