= Puʻuhonua o Hōnaunau National Historical Park =

Historic Place in Hawaii County, Hawaii, United States

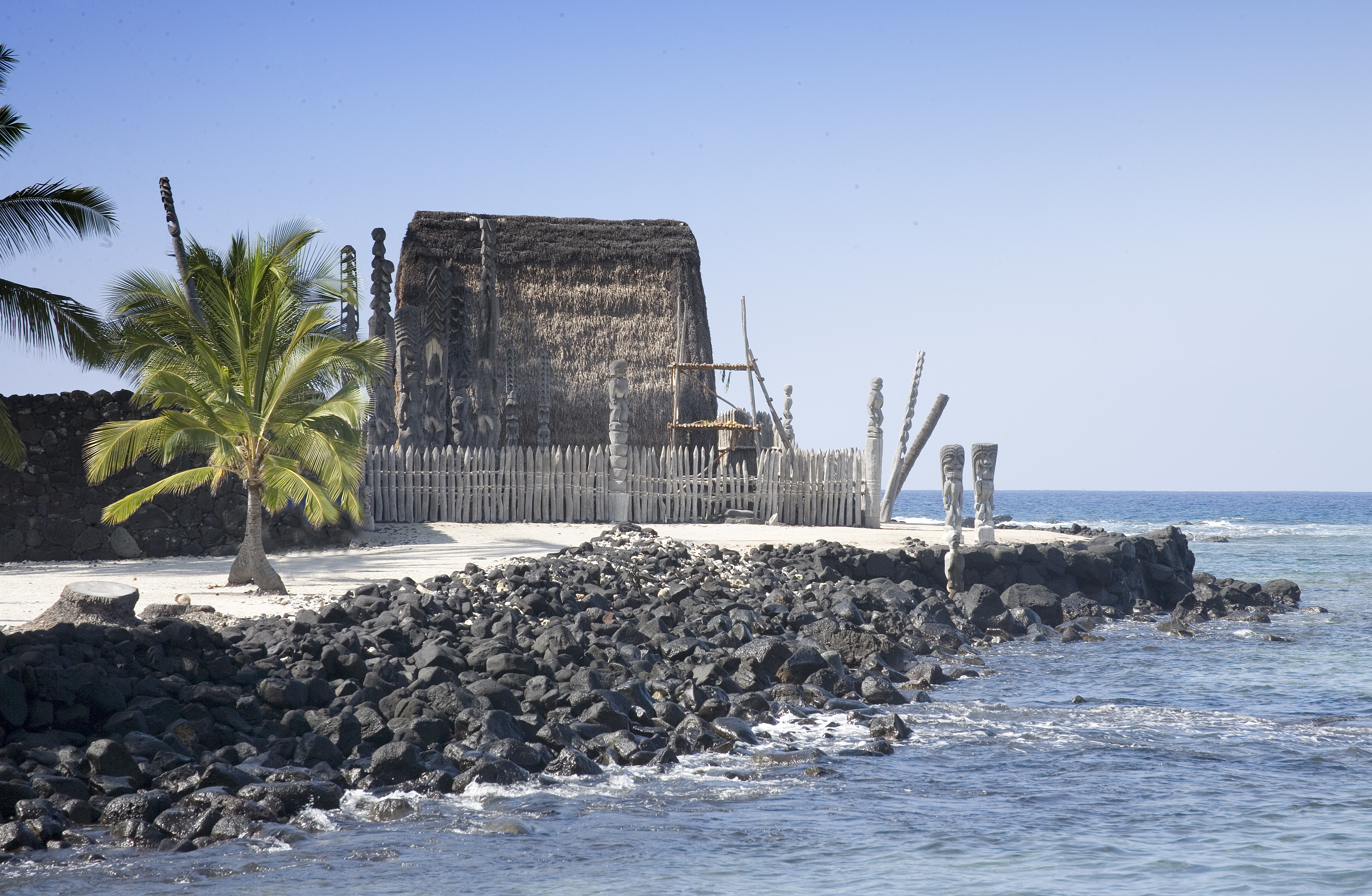
- Reconstructed Hale o Keawe

- Location within Hawaii
- Location: Hawaii County, Hawaii, United States
- Nearest city: Holualoa, Hawaiʻi
- Coordinates: 19°25′19″N 155°54′37″W
- Area: 420 acres (170 ha)
- Established: July 26, 1955
- Visitors: 371,957 (in 2025)
- Governing body: National Park Service
- Website: Puʻuhonua o Hōnaunau National Historical Park

Puʻuhonua o Hōnaunau National Historical Park is a United States National Historical Park located on the west coast of the island of Hawaiʻi in the U.S. state of Hawaii. The historical park preserves the site where, up until the early 19th century, Hawaiians who broke a kapu (one of the ancient laws) could avoid certain death by fleeing to this place of refuge or puʻuhonua. The offender would be absolved by a priest and freed to leave. Defeated warriors and non-combatants could also find refuge here during times of battle. The grounds just outside the Great Wall that encloses the puʻuhonua were home to several generations of powerful chiefs.

Puʻuhonua o Hōnaunau is one of the only four places in Hawaii where the flag of Hawaii can officially fly alone without the American flag; the other three places are ʻIolani Palace, the Mauna ʻAla and Thomas Square.

== Park name and features ==
The 420 acre (1.7 km^{2}) site was originally established in 1955 as City of Refuge National Historical Park and was renamed on November 10, 1978. In 2000 the name was changed by the Hawaiian National Park Language Correction Act of 2000, observing the Hawaiian spelling. It includes the puʻuhonua and a complex of archeological sites including: temple platforms, royal fishponds, sledding tracks, and some coastal village sites. The Hale o Keawe temple and several thatched structures have been reconstructed.

== Hale o Keawe heiau ==
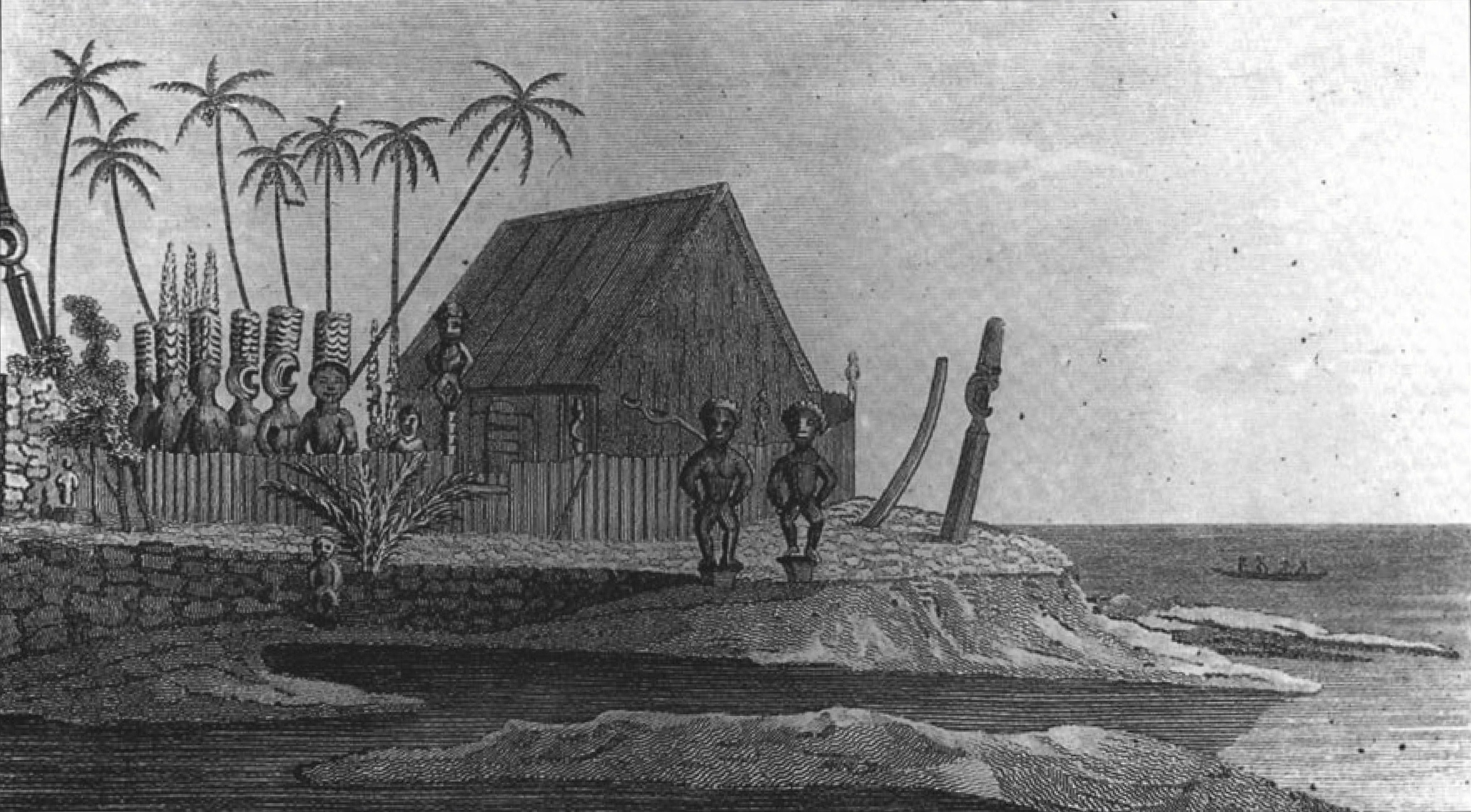
The original Hale o Keawe as drawn by William Ellis about 1822

Hale o Keawe was an ancient Hawaiian heiau originally built in approximately 1650 AD as the burial site for the ruling monarch (aliʻi nui) of the Island of Hawaii named Keaweʻīkekahialiʻiokamoku. It was built by his son, a Kona chief named Kanuha. The complex may have been established as early as 1475 under the aliʻi nui ʻEhu-kai-malino. The nobility (ali'i) of Kona continued to be buried until the abolition of the kapu system. The last person buried here was a son of Kamehameha I in 1818.

Radiocarbon dating has not been done extensively in the area. Testing of the nearby 'Āle'ale'a heiau site gave deceptive results. Oral traditions compiled by Dorothy Barrère are still considered the best for chronological order of the surrounding complex.

The heiau contained 23 remains including that of Keaweʻīkekahialiʻiokamoku. It was situated near a great ancient wall near the royal residence to the east side of the wall. Further south were further aliʻi homes were built. Excavations of the area indicate a large crafting community to support the royal residence. The heiau would lay untouched after the banning of the Hawaiian religion while all other such temples were destroyed until Kaahumanu had the building dismantled and all the remains moved to the royal mausoleum in Honolulu.

It was believed that additional protection to the place of refuge was received from the mana in the bones of the chiefs. It survived several years after other temples were destroyed. It was looted by Lord George Byron (cousin of the distinguished English poet) in 1825. In 1829, High Chiefess Kapiʻolani removed the remaining bones and hid them in the Pali Kapu O Keōua cliffs above nearby Kealakekua Bay. She then ordered this last temple to be destroyed. The bones were later moved to the Royal Mausoleum of Hawaii in 1858.

The heiau in the park was reconstructed in the 1960s.

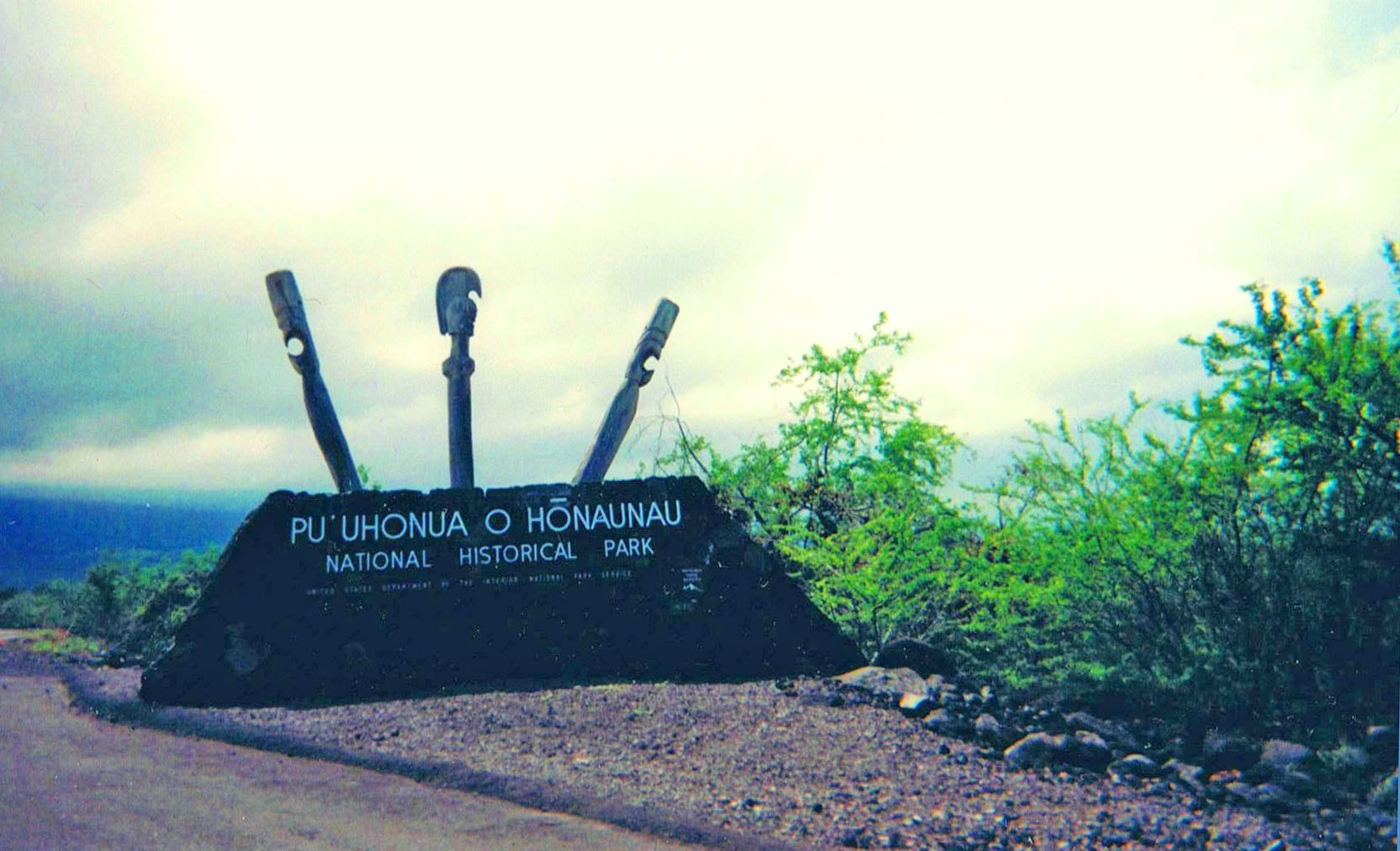
Park entrance

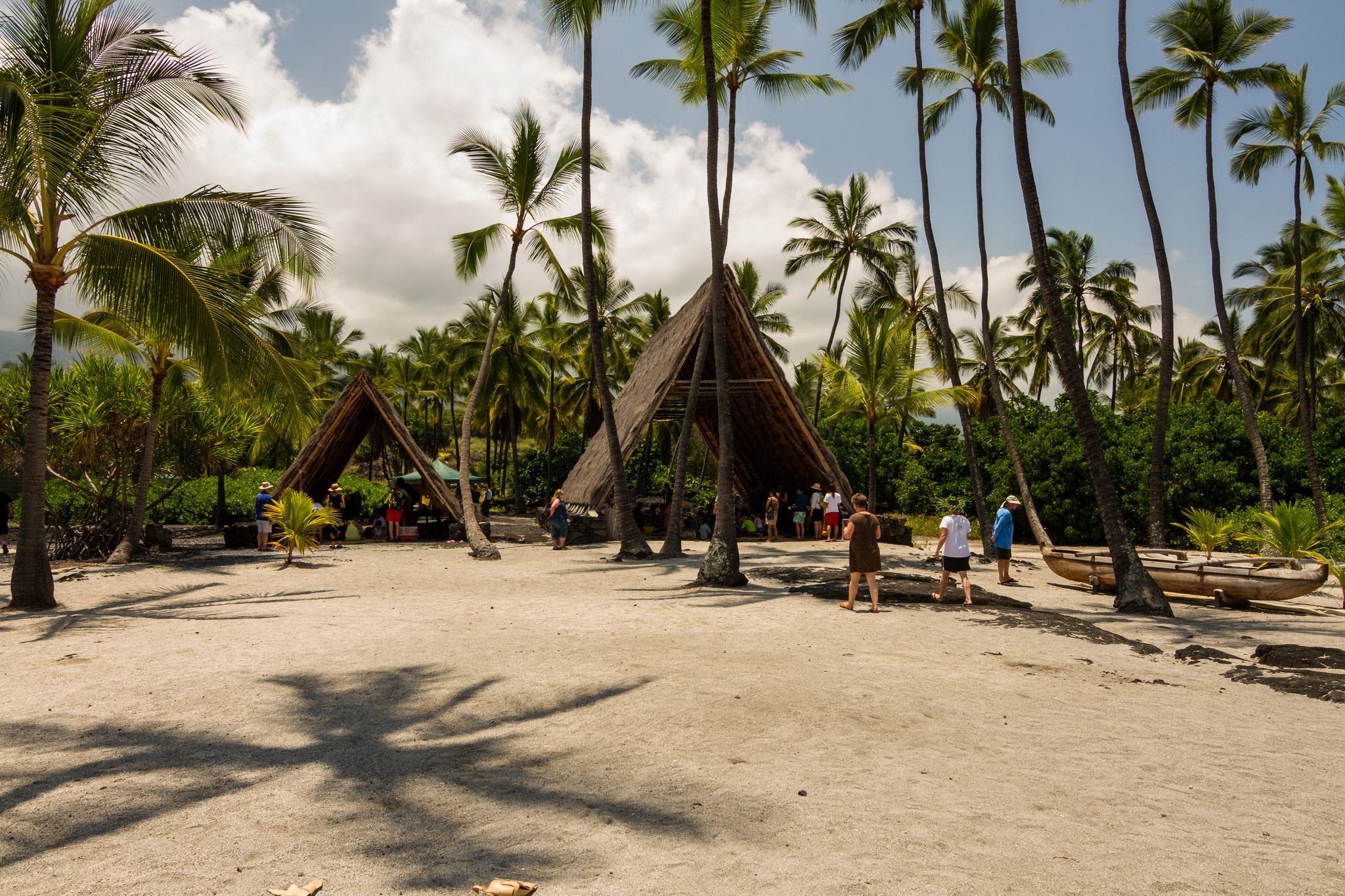
Hawaiian hale (house) at the Puʻuhonua o Hōnaunau National Historical Park

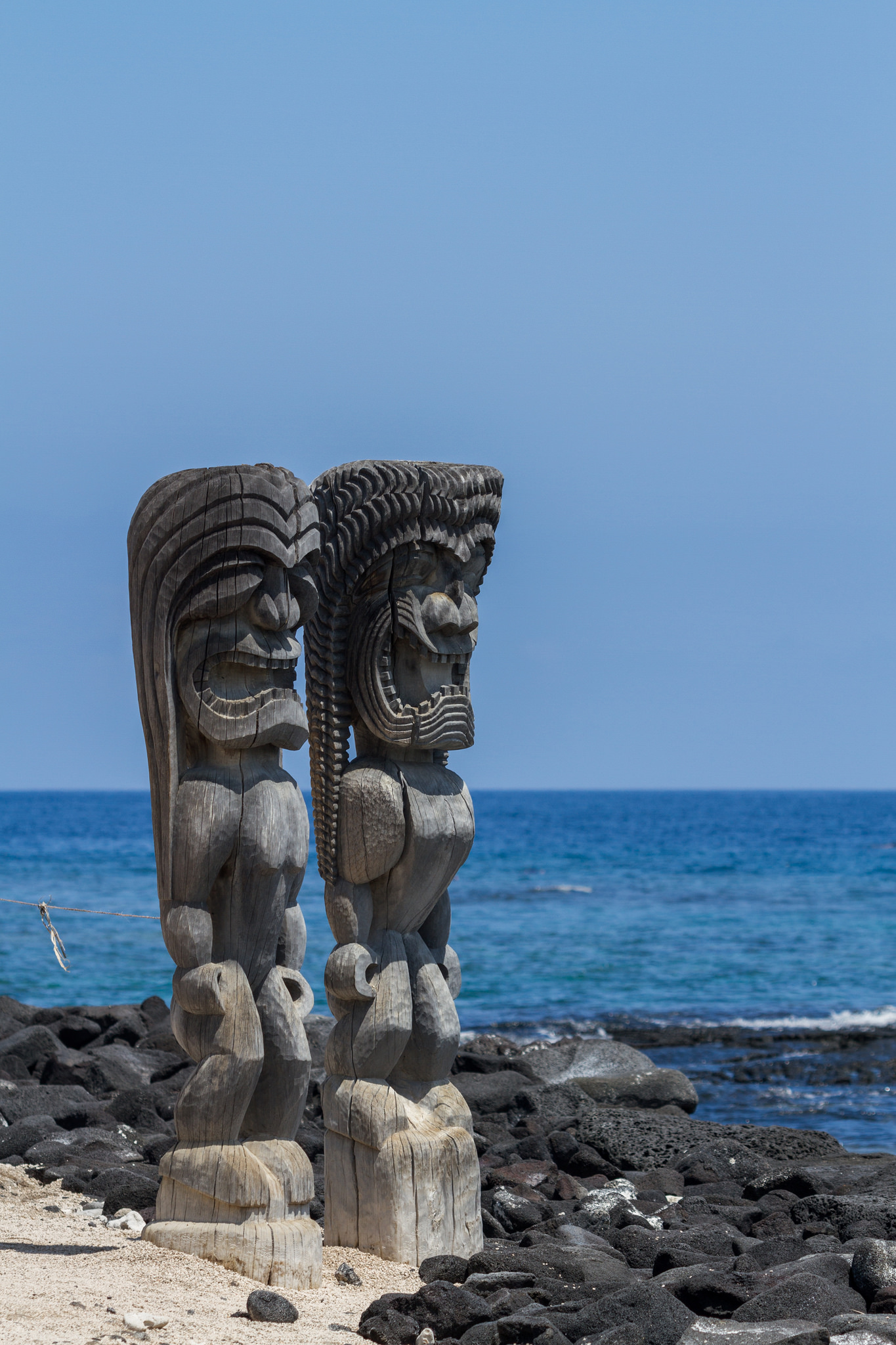
Protector kiʻi (statues) at the Place of Refuge

== See also ==
- Sanctuary City
