= HMS Carysfort (1836) =

Frigate of the Royal Navy

History

United Kingdom
- Name: HMS Carysfort
- Ordered: 29 June 1831
- Builder: Pembroke Dock
- Laid down: September 1832
- Launched: 12 August 1836
- Decommissioned: 1847
- Fate: Sold 1861

General characteristics
- Class & type: 26-gun sixth-rate frigate
- Tons burthen: 925 bm
- Length: 130 ft (39.6 m) (gundeck); 105 ft 10.125 in (32.3 m) (keel)
- Beam: 40 ft 5.875 in (12.3 m)
- Depth of hold: 11 ft (3.4 m)
- Propulsion: Sails
- Complement: 240
- Armament: UD: 18 × 32-pounder guns; QD: 6 × 32-pounder gunnades; Fc: 2 × 32-pounder gunnades

HMS Carysfort was a sixth-rate sailing frigate of the Royal Navy, launched in 1836 and named for the Earl of Carysfort, who had been a former (civilian) Lord of the Admiralty. Her captain, Lord George Paulet, occupied the Hawaiian Islands for five months in 1843. She was decommissioned in 1847 and finally broken up in 1861.

== Launch ==
She was originally ordered from Pembroke Dock on 29 June 1831 as a frigate of the 709-ton Andromache class, but on 24 June 1832 the design was amended and the Carysfort was re-ordered as a unit of the new 912-ton Vestal class. After launching, she was taken to Sheerness Dockyard where she was completed fitting on 18 February 1837.

== Under Byam Martin ==
From 21 November 1836 she was under command of Captain Henry Byam Martin (son of Sir Thomas Byam Martin). Martin sailed her for the Mediterranean on 12 March 1837.

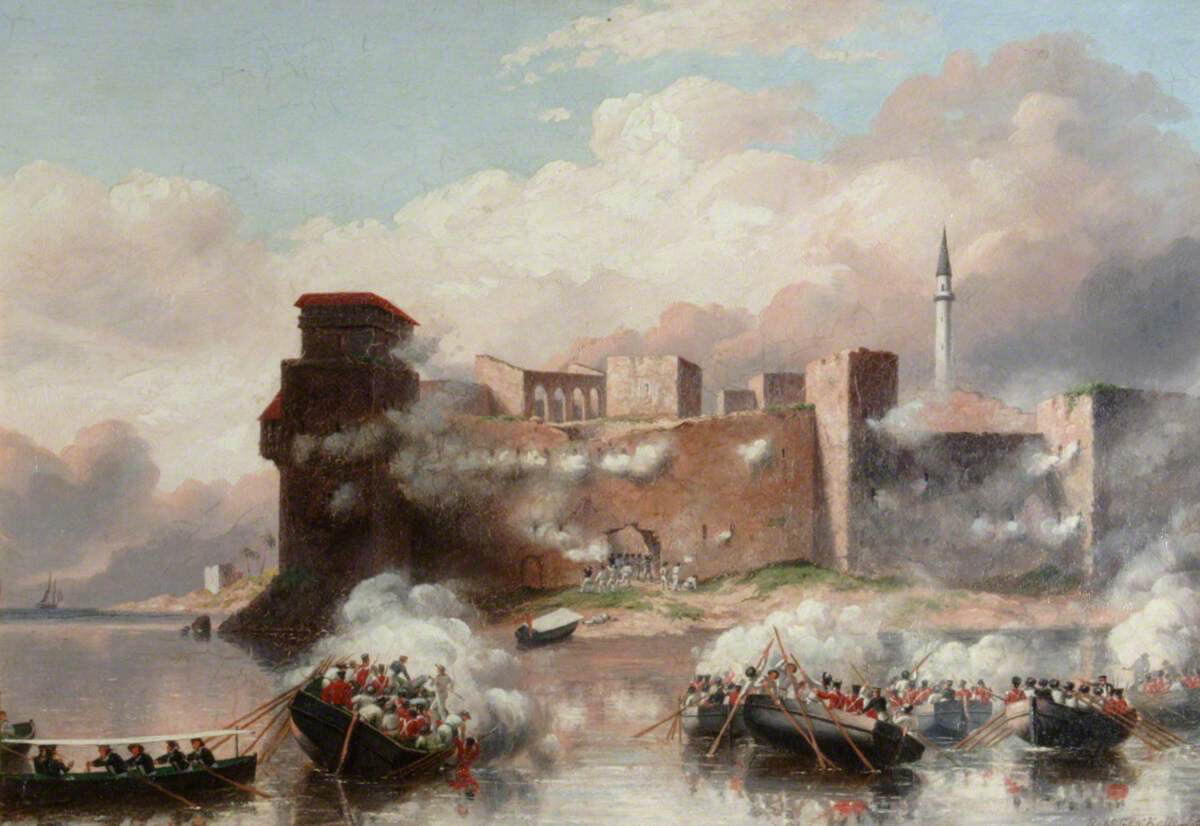
The Boats of HM frigates Carysfort and Zebra with 50 Royal Marines, commanded by Lieut. R. H. Harrison, Royal Marines, attacking the castle of Tortosa, 25 September 1840

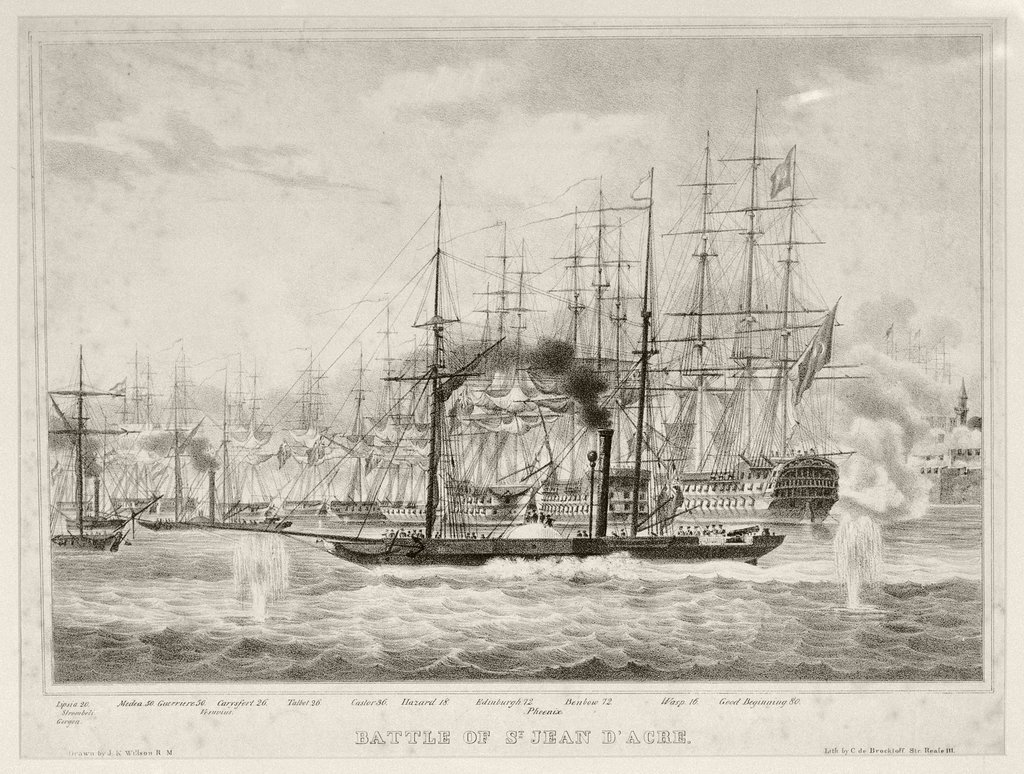
Carysfort is in this picture of the Battle of St. Jean d'Acre, 3 November 1840

On 26 September 1840 she joined HMS Zebra in action off Tartus during the Syrian War and took part in the capture of Acre on 3 November 1840.

== Under Paulet ==
Lord George Paulet (1803–1879) became her captain on 28 December 1841 in the Pacific Ocean under Rear Admiral Richard Darton Thomas (1777–1857). From February through July 1843 he took control of the government of the Kingdom of Hawaii. This became known as the Paulet Affair. Admiral Thomas restored the king, as Paulet had only been given instructions to investigate claims against British subjects in the islands.

== Under Seymour ==
Captain George Henry Seymour took command of Carysfort on 12 December 1845. He remained her captain until 1848.

== Notable passengers ==
Sir Charles Augustus Fitzroy, his wife the Right Honourable Lady Mary and their second son George, made the voyage on the Carysfort from London to Sydney, where Sir Charles took up his position as the tenth Governor of New South Wales. They arrived on 2 August 1846.

== Fate ==
In 1847 she was laid up at Pembroke Dock and decommissioned. On 22 November 1861 she was sold to Messrs. Ritherdon & Thompson (for £1,200) to be broken up.
