= HMS Dublin (1812) =

Vengeur-class ship of the line

- Plan drawing of Dublin

History

United Kingdom
- Name: Dublin
- Ordered: 31 July 1807
- Builder: Samuel & Daniel Brent, Rotherhithe
- Laid down: May 1809
- Launched: 13 February 1812
- Commissioned: August 1812
- Fate: Sold for scrap, July 1885

General characteristics (as built)
- Class & type: Vengeur-class ship of the line
- Tons burthen: 1,766 (bm)
- Length: 176 ft 3 in (53.7 m) (gundeck)
- Beam: 47 ft 10 in (14.6 m)
- Draught: 17 ft 3 in (5.3 m) (light)
- Depth of hold: 21 ft (6.4 m)
- Sail plan: Full-rigged ship
- Complement: 590
- Armament: 74 muzzle-loading, smoothbore guns; Gundeck: 28 × 32 pdr guns; Upper deck: 28 × 18 pdr guns; Quarterdeck: 4 × 12 pdr guns + 10 × 32 pdr carronades; Forecastle: 2 × 12 pdr guns + 2 × 32 pdr carronades

HMS Dublin was a 74-gun third rate Vengeur-class ship of the line built for the Royal Navy in the first decade of the 19th century. Completed in 1812, she played a minor role in the Napoleonic Wars.

Dublin shared the proceeds of the capture on 17 July 1813 of Union with Abercrombie. (Note: A first-class share of the prize money was worth £7 19s 2¾d; a sixth-class share was worth 11½d.)

On 19 December 1812 HMS Rolla recaptured the whaler Frederick. Rolla shared the salvage money for Frederick with Dublin and Inconstant.

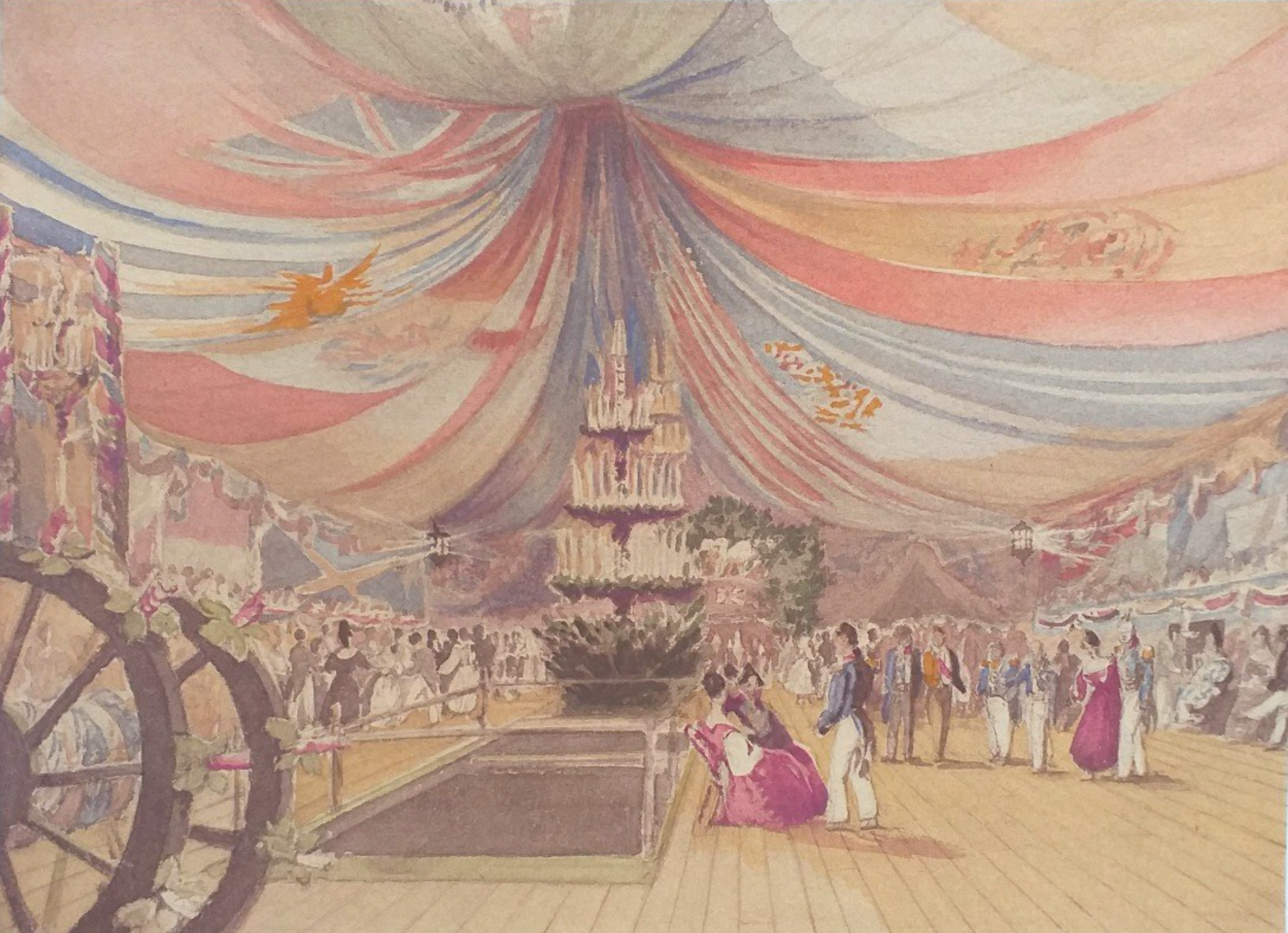
A ball given on board by Admiral Hamond in 1835, painting by Emeric Essex Vidal

In 1826 Dublin was reduced to a 40-gun ship. She became the flagship of Commander-in-Chief of the Pacific fleet Admiral Sir Graham Hamond, 2nd Baronet from 1835 to 1838, and Rear Admiral Richard Darton Thomas (1777–1857), from 1841 to 1845.

Dublin was sold out of the Navy in 1885.
