= Richard Darton Thomas =

British admiral (1777–1857)

Admiral Richard Darton Thomas
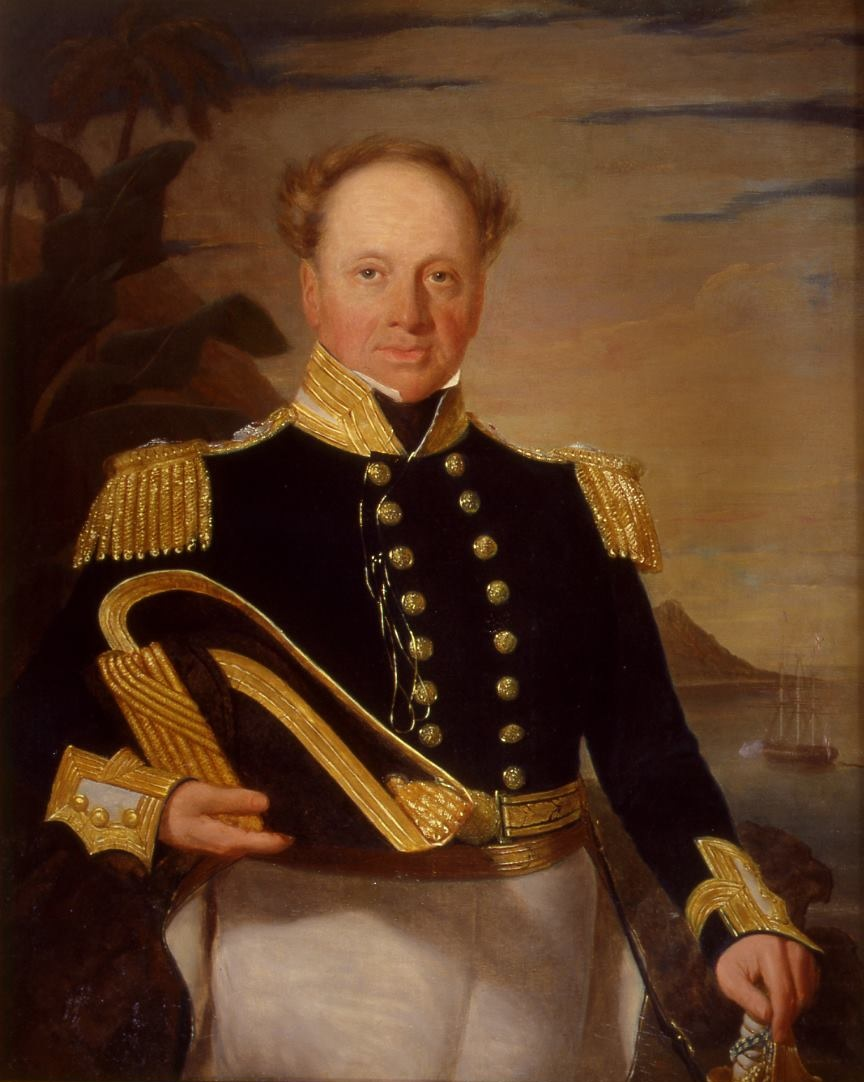
- Born: 3 June 1777; Saltash, Cornwall, England
- Died: 21 August 1857 (aged 80); Stonehouse, Devon, England
- Military career
- Allegiance: United Kingdom
- Branch: Royal Navy
- Service years: 1790–1857
- Rank: Admiral
- Units: HMS Cumberland; HMS Blanche; HMS Nautilus; HMS Boyne; HMS Glory; HMS Barfleur; HMS Victory; HMS Excellent; HMS Thalia; HMS Defence; HMS Triumph; HMS Cambrian; HMS Leander
- Commands: HMS Chichester; HMS Aetna; HMS Bellerophon; HMS Queen; HMS Ocean; HMS Ville de Paris; HMS Undaunted; Pacific Station
- Conflicts: French Revolutionary Wars; Battle of Martinique; Battle of Cape St Vincent; Napoleonic Wars; Paulet Affair

Admiral Richard Darton Thomas (3 June 1777 – 21 August 1857) was an officer of the British Royal Navy who served during the French Revolutionary and Napoleonic Wars, and went on to become Commander-in-Chief, Pacific Station in the 1840s.

== Biography ==
=== Background and early naval service ===
Thomas was born in Saltash, Cornwall, and entered the Navy on 26 May 1790, just before his 13th birthday, as a captain's servant aboard the 74-gun ship Cumberland, under the command of Captain John McBride, and late in the year sailed to the West Indies as part of a squadron under Rear-Admiral Samuel Pitchford Cornish. On arrival in the Caribbean he transferred to the 32-gun frigate Blanche under the command of Captain Robert Murray, and was rated able. Blanche was paid off in June 1792, and in December he joined the sloop Nautilus as a midshipman.

=== Wartime service ===
On 1 January 1793 France declared war on Great Britain, and for the next two years Thomas served aboard Nautilus in the West Indies under the Captains Lord Henry Paulet, James Carpenter, Henry William Bayntun, and William Gordon Rutherford, while taking part in operations against the French islands of Tobago, Saint Lucia, and Martinique, where he commanded a boat in the attack on Fort Royal, landing and escalading the walls simultaneously with Captain Robert Faulknor of the sloop Zebra.

Thomas returned to England as master's mate of the Boyne, the flagship of Sir John Jervis. He was aboard her at Spithead on 1 May 1795 when a fire broke out aboard and the ship was destroyed. Thomas was forced to jump overboard, and swam to a nearby boat. He served aboard the Glory, then Barfleur, flagship of the Honourable William Waldegrave, with whom he sailed to the Mediterranean. From there he moved into Victory, flagship of Sir John Jervis. He was subsequently sent on shore with a party of seamen to man the guns at the Fort of St. Fiorenza, in Corsica, remaining there until the island was evacuated in October 1796.

On 15 January 1797 Thomas was commissioned as a lieutenant aboard the 74-gun Excellent, commanded by Captain Cuthbert Collingwood, and took part in the Battle of Cape St Vincent on 14 February. In June 1798 he moved into the frigate Thalia, under Captain Lord Henry Paulet, rejoining him in the 74-gun Defence in February 1799 after three months on half-pay. From December 1799 until the signing of the Treaty of Amiens in March 1802 brought a temporary peace, Thomas served as flag lieutenant to Collingwood in the Triumph and Barfleur on the Channel Station. From June 1802 he served aboard the Cambrian and Leander, the flagships of Sir Andrew Mitchell, Commander-in-Chief on the North American Station, based at Halifax, Nova Scotia. In early June 1803 Thomas finally received notification of his promotion to commander of the fifth-rate Chichester, dated 18 January.

He sailed from Halifax as a passenger aboard the 179-ton Post Office packet Lady Hobart. Four days out she was intercepted by a French schooner, L' Aimable Julie, who mistook her for an unarmed merchant. After taking the French vessel as prize, Lady Hobart continued on her voyage, but during the night of 28 July struck a large iceberg, and foundered. All aboard her were crammed into the ship's cutter and jolly boat for a 350-mile voyage back to land, with only small amounts of ship's biscuit, water and rum as provisions. Despite encountering heavy rain, gales and thick fog, they made a landfall at Lower Island Cove on 4 June, all suffering from various degrees of malnutrition and frostbite. The only casualty was the French captain, who threw himself overboard in a fit of depression.

Thomas eventually returned to England and in December 1803 was appointed to command of the bomb vessel Aetna, to serve in the Mediterranean. On 22 October 1805, following the victory at Trafalgar, he was posted into Bellerophon briefly, before serving aboard the Queen, Ocean and Ville de Paris as flag captain to Lord Collingwood, engaged primarily on the blockade of Toulon. His position was a particularly arduous one, there being no Captain of the Fleet, and Collingwood was for much of the time severely ill with the cancer that would eventually kill him in March 1810. After Collingwood's death Thomas served as captain of the Ville de Paris until December 1810. The following February he was appointed to command of the frigate Undaunted initially engaged on operations on the coast of Catalonia, then on the blockade of Marseilles and Toulon. He was eventually invalided home in February 1813, and saw no further wartime service.

=== Post-war career ===
Between April 1822 and April 1825, and again from May 1834, Thomas served as Superintendent of the Ships in Ordinary at Portsmouth and Plymouth, until promoted to rear-admiral on 10 January 1837. From May 1841 until December 1844 he served as commander-in-chief on the Pacific Station, flying his flag on Dublin. His duties were more diplomatic than military; settling the long-standing claims of the owners of the British brig Anna which had been seized in 1822, and of the British merchants who had been plundered at Callao, and obtaining compensation from El Salvador and Costa Rica for injuries and losses sustained by the British residents. He also had to deal with the occupation of Tahiti by the French Rear-Admiral Abel Aubert du Petit-Thouars, and the unauthorized annexation of the Sandwich Islands by one of his own subordinates. His conduct in office, particularly his handling of the Sandwich Islands crisis received the full approval of the Foreign Office and Admiralty, and King Kamehameha III ordered a portrait of Thomas in full uniform for his palace. He also received the thanks of the government of the United States and was appointed an honorary member of the American Board of Commissioners for Foreign Missions.

Thomas was promoted to vice-admiral on 8 January 1848, and to admiral on 11 September 1854. He died in Stonehouse, Devon on 21 August 1857.

== Personal life ==
On 2 October 1827 Thomas married Gratiana, the third daughter of Lieutenant-General Robert Williams, Colonel-Commandant of the Royal Marines at Stonehouse, and had a son and daughter. His brother, Charles Thomas, M.D., was Physician to the Dispensary at Devonport. On 13 November 1850 his daughter Gratiana Mary Thomas (1831–1922) married Sir Mathew Wharton Wilson (1827–1909), son of Sir Mathew Wilson, 1st Baronet, one of the Wilson baronets.

== See also ==
- Thomas Square, Honolulu

Military offices
Preceded by Charles Ross	Commander-in-Chief, Pacific Station; 1844–1847	Succeeded by Sir George Seymour
