= Coat of arms of the Hawaiian Kingdom =

Royal coat of arms of the Hawaiian Kingdom
- Armiger: King Kamehameha III in right of the Crown
- Adopted: 1845
- Crest: Upon the helm, the Crown of Hawaii
- Shield: Quarterly, I and IV red, white, and blue stripes (barry of eight gules, azure, and argent) representing the eight inhabited Hawaiian islands. II and III two emblems of taboo (pulo'ulo'u) in their natural colours (proper) on yellow (the colour or). Inescutcheon is coloured green (vert) with crossed spears (in saltire) and triangular flag, both yellow.
- Supporters: On the dexter, Kamanawa holding a spear; on the sinister, Kameʻeiamoku holding a feather standard or kāhili. Both were high chiefs and Counselors of State to King Kamehameha I.
- Motto: Ua mau ke ea o ka ʻāina i ka pono ("The life of the land is perpetuated in righteousness")

The coat of arms of the Hawaiian Kingdom was officially adopted by the Legislative Assembly in 1845, during the reign of King Kamehameha III. The arms were designed by Portcullis Pursuivant of arms from the College of Arms in London (at the time George Collen), commissioned by Timoteo Ha‘alilio, the King's private secretary and royal advisor, Reverend William Richards.

== Design and symbolism ==
The coat of arms is quartered. The first and fourth quarters contain eight alternating white, red, and blue stripes, which represent the Hawaiian flag and the eight inhabited islands of the Kingdom. The second and third quarters contain a pūloʻuloʻu, a kapa-covered ball atop a stick. This was an insignia carried before a chief as a symbol of kapu (taboo) and protection. In the center of the shield is a triangular banner (puela) and crossed spears, also symbolizing protection and kapu. The banner was often flown above the sails of chiefly canoes as a marker of royal status. The coat of arms features two male figures dressed in ʻahu ʻula (feather cloaks) and mahiole (feathered helmets). These are the sacred royal twin brothers, Kameʻeiamoku and Kamanawa, who assisted Kamehameha I in coming to power. One brother holds a spear while the other bears a feathered kāhili, a symbol of royalty. A crown ornamented with kalo leaves, symbolizing the monarchy, rests atop the shield. The background of the coat of arms is meant to depict a draped ʻahu ʻula.

== History ==
The first version of the Hawaiian coat of arms came to be during the reign of Kamehameha III. In July 1842, he sent two emissaries, William Richards and Timoteo Ha‘alilio, to the United States and Europe on an official mission to negotiate formal treaties to recognize the Kingdom of Hawaii’s independence. While in London in 1843, Timoteo Ha‘alilio, the King's private secretary and Royal Advisor, Rev. William Richards commissioned the College of Arms to create the coat of arms. The design was officially adopted in 1845.

The design was slightly modified during the reign of King Kalākaua.

== Motto ==
Written on the sash at the bottom of the coat of arms is Ua Mau ke Ea o ka ʻĀina i ka Pono, the phrase spoken by King Kamehameha III when the sovereignty of the Kingdom was restored on July 31, 1843, after the Paulet affair. The motto translates to "The life of the land is perpetuated in righteousness".

== Gallery ==
King Kalākaua's version of the royal coat of arms.

Precursor drawing of the coat of arms, 1843.

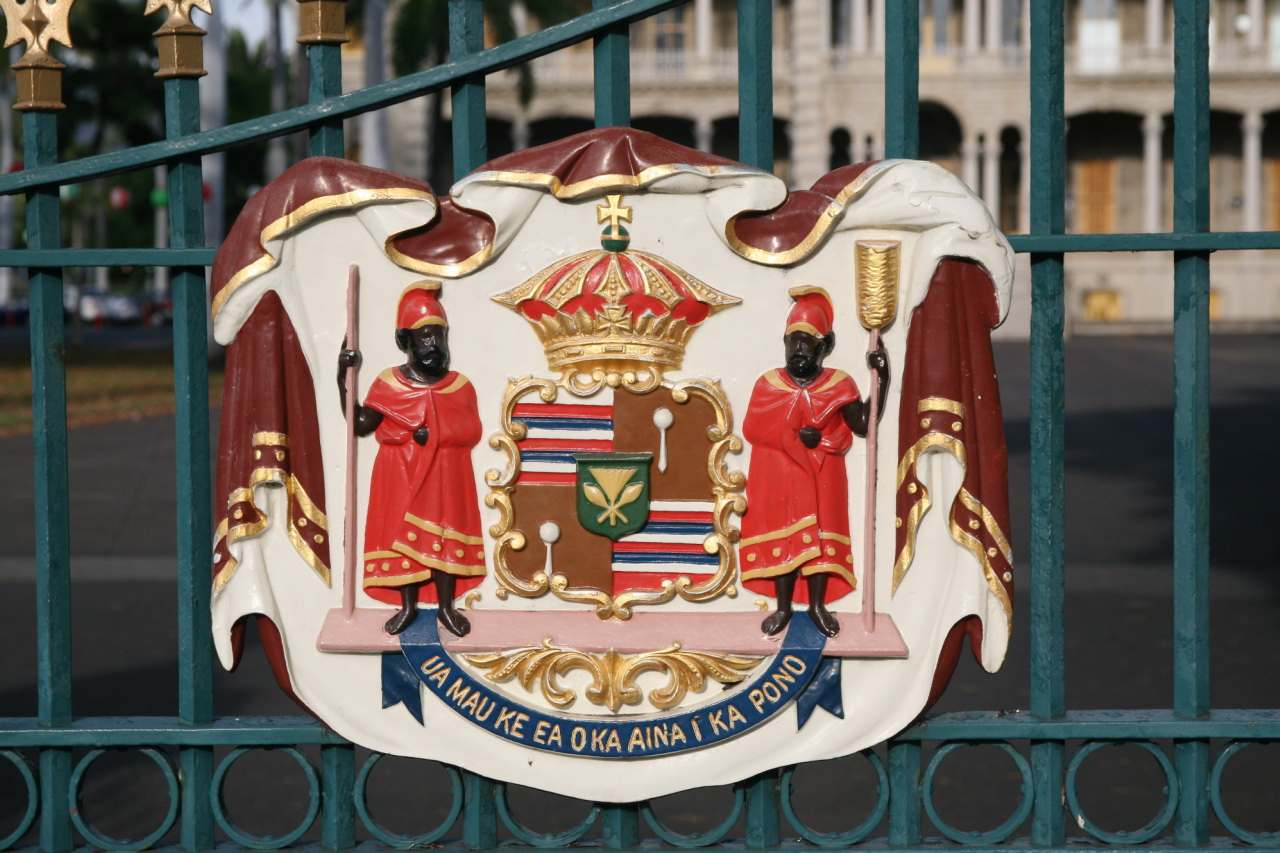
Coat of arms on the gates of Iolani Palace.

Royal Standard of King Kalākaua.

Crown of the kings of the Hawaiian Islands, for heraldic uses.

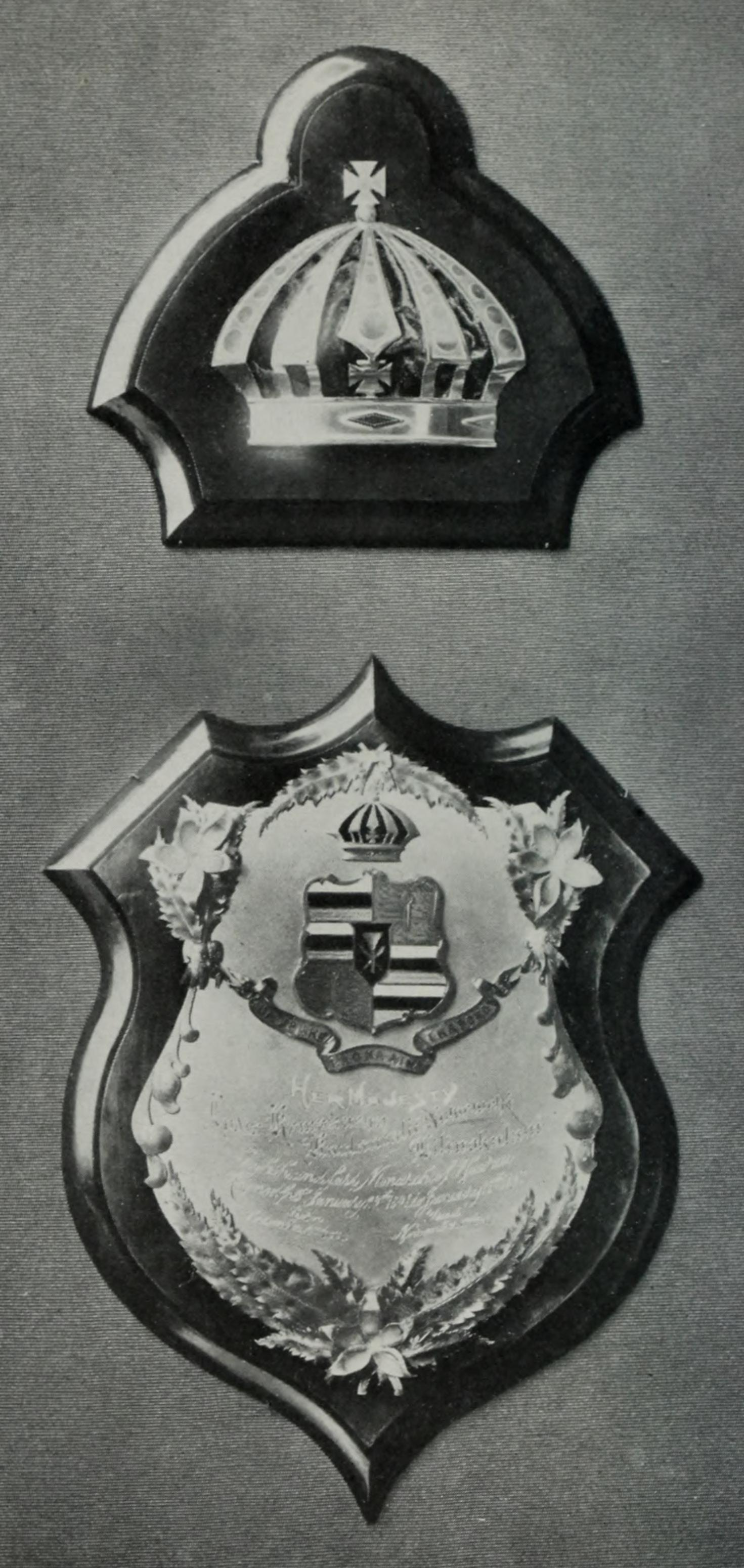
The coat of arms and the Crown of Hawaii as seen on the Casket of Liliuokalani.

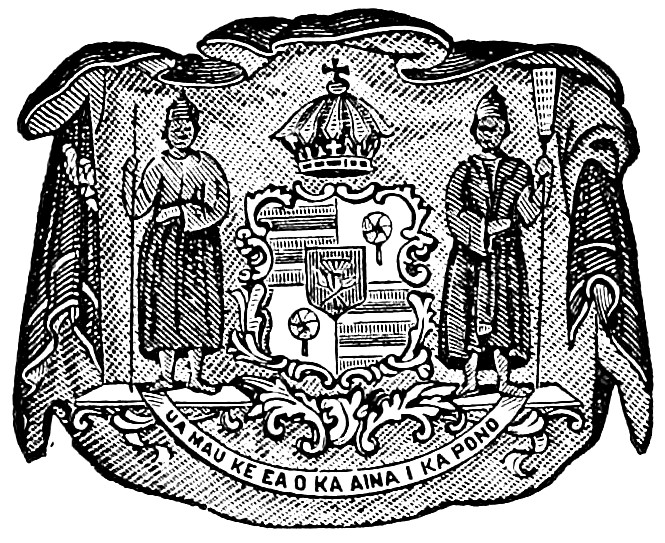
From the Hawaiian Club of Boston, October 1868.

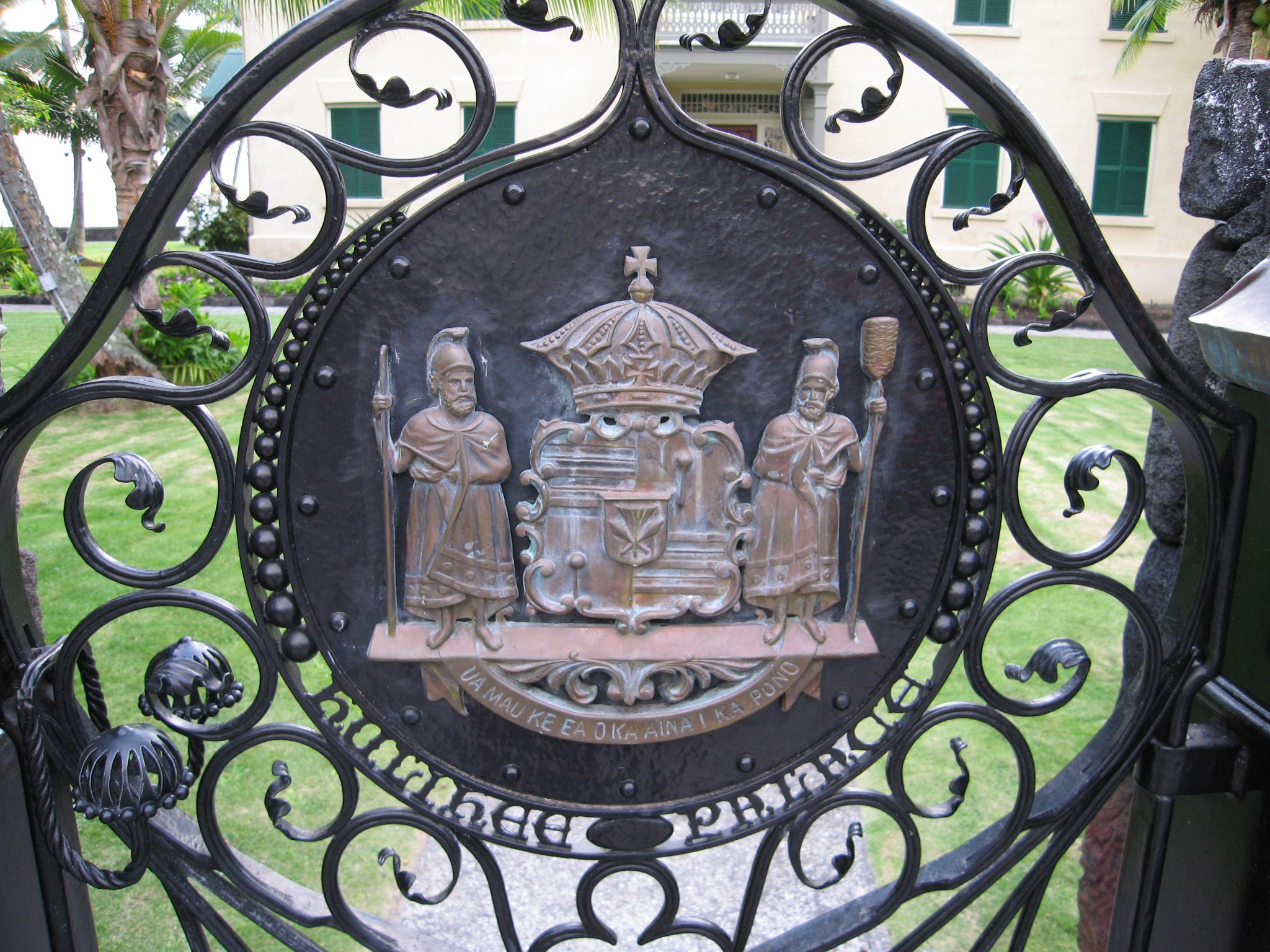
Coat of arms on the gate of the Huliheʻe Palace.

== See also ==
- Iolani Palace – The royal residence of the Hawaiian monarchs.
- Seal of Hawaii – The modern seal of the U.S. state of Hawaii
