= E Ola Ke Aliʻi Ke Akua =

National anthem of the Hawaiian Kingdom from 1860 to 1866

English: God Save the King
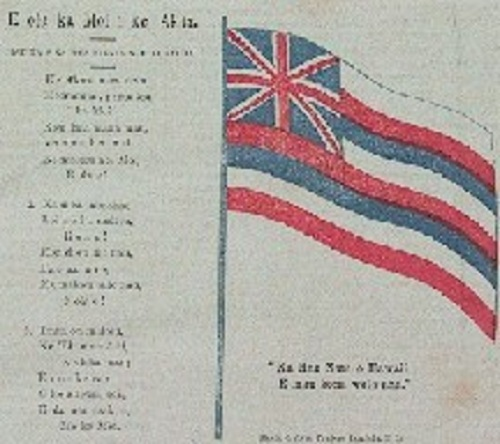
- National anthem of the Kingdom of Hawaii
- Lyrics: Lunalilo
- Music: Same as God Save the King
- Adopted: 1860
- Relinquished: 1866

Audio sample
- file; help

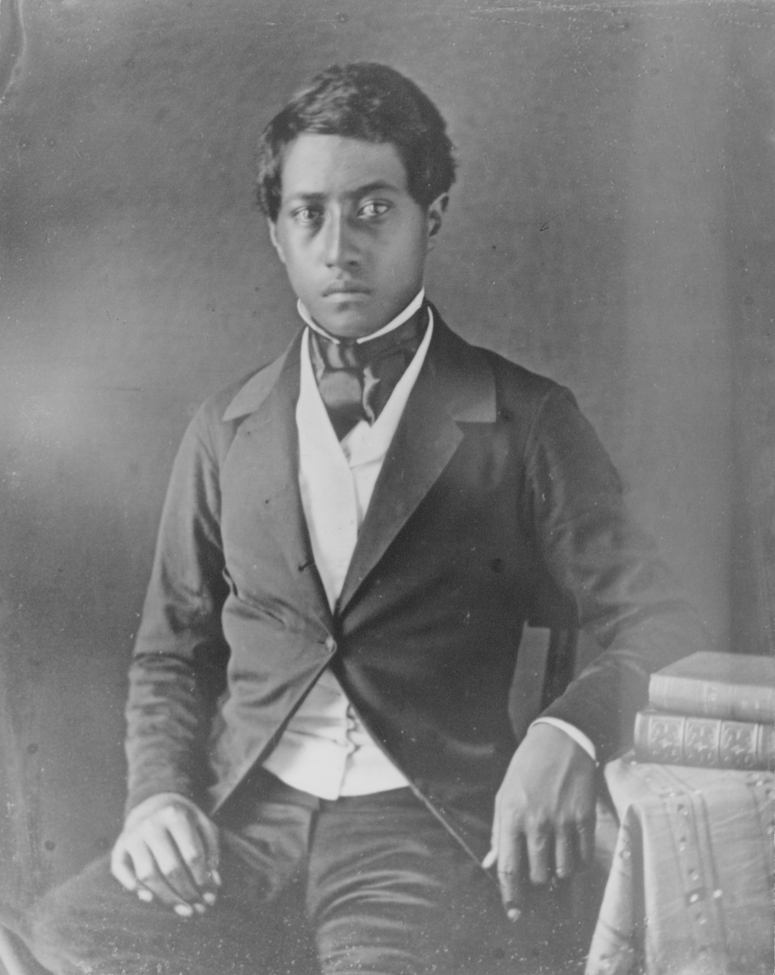
Lunalilo wrote the lyrics for Hawaiʻi's first national anthem.

"E Ola Ke Aliʻi Ke Akua" ('God Save the King') was one of the four national anthems of the Hawaiian Kingdom. It was composed in 1860 by then 25-year-old Prince William Charles Lunalilo, who later became King Lunalilo. Prior to 1860, Hawai‘i lacked its own national anthem and had used the British royal anthem "God Save the King". A contest was sponsored in 1860 by Kamehameha IV, who wanted a song with Hawaiian lyrics set to the tune of the British anthem. The winning entry was written by Lunalilo and was reputed to have been written in 20 minutes. Lunalilo was awarded 10 dollars which he later donated to the Queen's Hospital. His composition became Hawaiʻi's first national anthem. It remained Hawaiʻi's national anthem for 6 years until 1866, when it was replaced by Queen Liliʻuokalani's composition "He Mele Lāhui Hawaiʻi".

== "E Ola Ke Aliʻi Ke Akua" ==
Ke Akua Mana Mau
Hoʻomaikaʻi, pōmaikaʻi
I ka mōʻī
Kou lima mana mau
Mālama kiaʻi mai
Ko mākou nei mōʻī
Ē ola ē

Ka inoa kamahaʻo
Lei nani o mākou
Ē ola ē
Kou ʻēheu uhi mai
Pale nā ʻino e
Kā mākou pule no
Ē ola ē

I mua ou mākou
Ke aliʻi o nā Aliʻi
E aloha mai
E mau ke ea ē
ʻO ke aupuni nei
E ola mau mākou
Me ka mōʻī

Translation:

Eternal, mighty God
Bless us from your bright abode
Our sovereign king
May your all powerful arm
Ward from our sire all harm
Let no vile foe alarm
Long may he reign

Royal distinguished name
Our beauteous diadem
Long life be yours
Thy wing spread over our land
From every foe defend
To you our prayers ascend
Long live our king

Before Thee
King of Kings
Of Whom all nature sings
Our prayer we bring
Oh let our kingdom live
Life, peace and union give
Let all Thy care receive
Bless Thou our king

Preceded by God Save The King	National Anthem of the Kingdom of Hawaiʻi; 1860–1866	Succeeded by He Mele Lāhui Hawaiʻi
