= Flag of Hawaii =

U.S. state flag

Hawaii
- Ka Hae Hawaiʻi
- Use: Civil and state flag
- Proportion: 1:2
- Adopted: May 25, 1845; 181 years ago
- Design: Eight alternating horizontal stripes of white, red, and blue, with the United Kingdom's Union Jack (ratio 4:7) in the canton.

The flag of Hawaii (Hawaiian: Ka Hae Hawaiʻi), also known as the Hawaiian flag, (Note: Both the Hawaii State Constitution (article XV section 3) and Hawaii state law refer to the flag as the 'Hawaiian flag'.) is the official flag of the U.S. state of Hawaii. Along with the flag of Texas, it is one of two state flags to have previously served as a national flag of an independent country. It consists of a field of eight horizontal stripes, in the sequence of white, red, blue, white, red, blue, white, red, with a British Union Jack depicted as a canton in the upper-left corner. The flag has been in use since 1845.

The use of the Union Jack is a legacy of the British Royal Navy's historical relations with the Kingdom of Hawaiʻi and, in particular, the pro-British sentiment of its first ruler, King Kamehameha I. The kingdom was never formally part of the British Empire. The flag design was retained after the overthrow of the Hawaiian monarchy in 1893, after U.S. annexation in 1898, and after statehood in 1959.

== Statute ==
The 2024 Hawaii Revised Statutes, § 5–19 defines that the flag shall consist of:

"eight horizontal stripes, alternately white, red, blue, etc., beginning at the top, having a jack cantoned in the dexter chief angle next to the point of suspension; the jack shall consist of a blue field charged with a compound saltire of alternate tincture white and red, the white having precedence, a narrow edge of white bordering each red side of the saltire; a red cross bordered with white is charged over all; the proportions shall be that the fly is twice the hoist, the jack is half the hoist in breadth and 7/16 the fly in length, the arms of the red cross with border are equal in width to one of the horizontal stripes with the white border one-third the width of the red cross, and the arms of the compound saltire are equal in width to the red cross with the tinctures white, red, and the border in the proportion of 3, 2, and 1, respectively."

== Design and symbolism ==
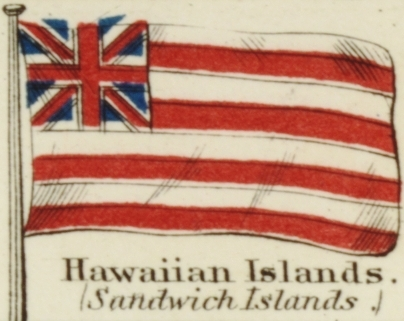
An 1868 flag chart. Note the lack of blue stripes.

The canton of the flag of Hawaii contains the Union Flag of the United Kingdom, prominent over the first quadrant closest to the flag mast. The field of the flag is composed of eight horizontal stripes, symbolizing the eight major islands (Hawaiʻi, Maui, Kahoʻolawe, Lānaʻi, Molokaʻi, Oʻahu, Kauaʻi, and Niʻihau). The color of the stripes, from the top down, follows the sequence: white, red, blue, white, red, blue, white, red. The colors "red", "blue", and "white" are not explicitly defined.

Despite resembling the flags of British Overseas Territories, where the canton uses the full upper-left quadrant, the canton of the Hawaiian flag is proportioned in the ratio 4:7. This is a consequence of the flag having a 1:2 overall proportion while the description of the canton in Hawaiian law is given as: "half the hoist (width) in breadth and 7–16 the fly in length".

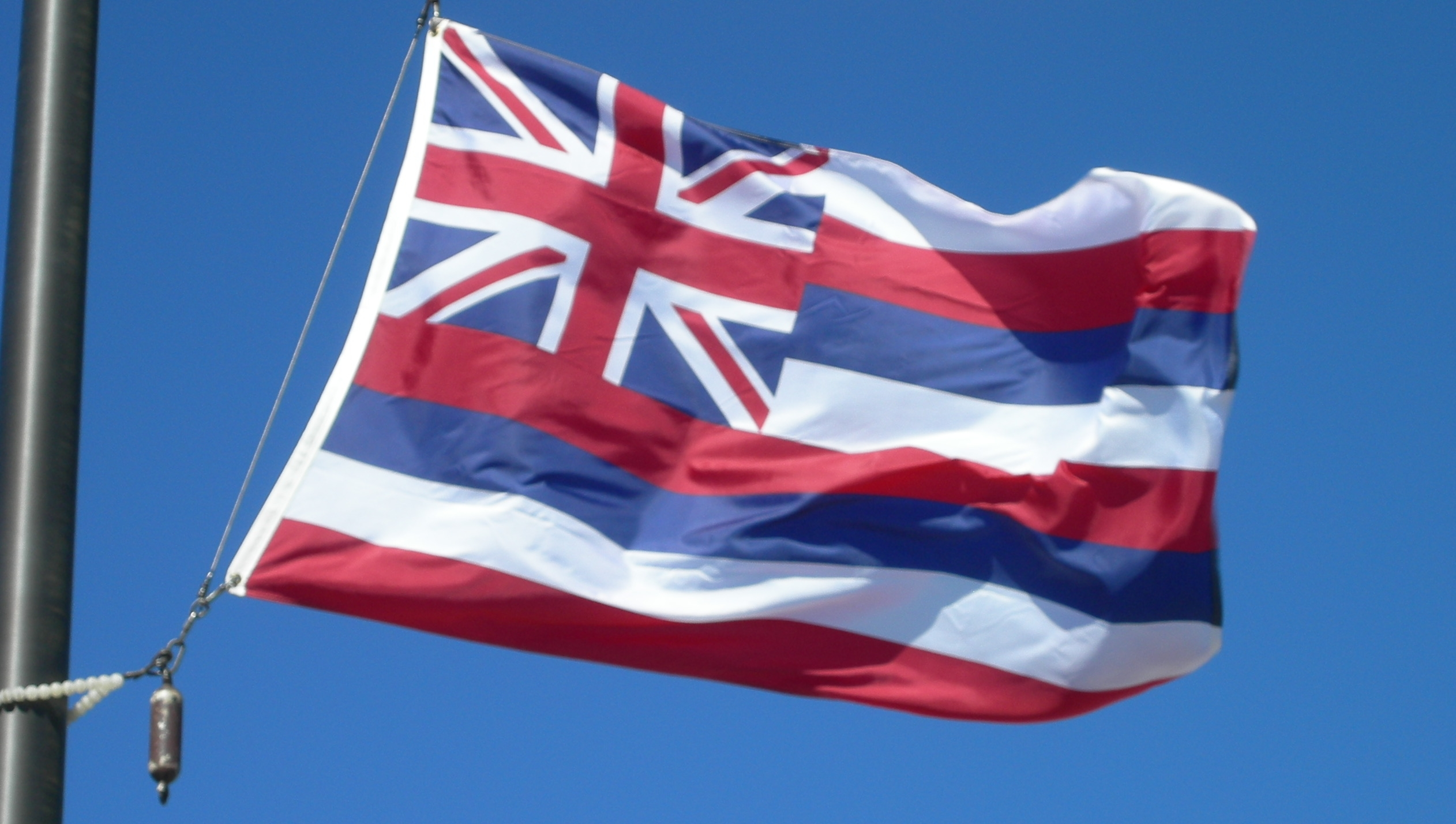
The flag of Hawaii flying in Haleakalā National Park.

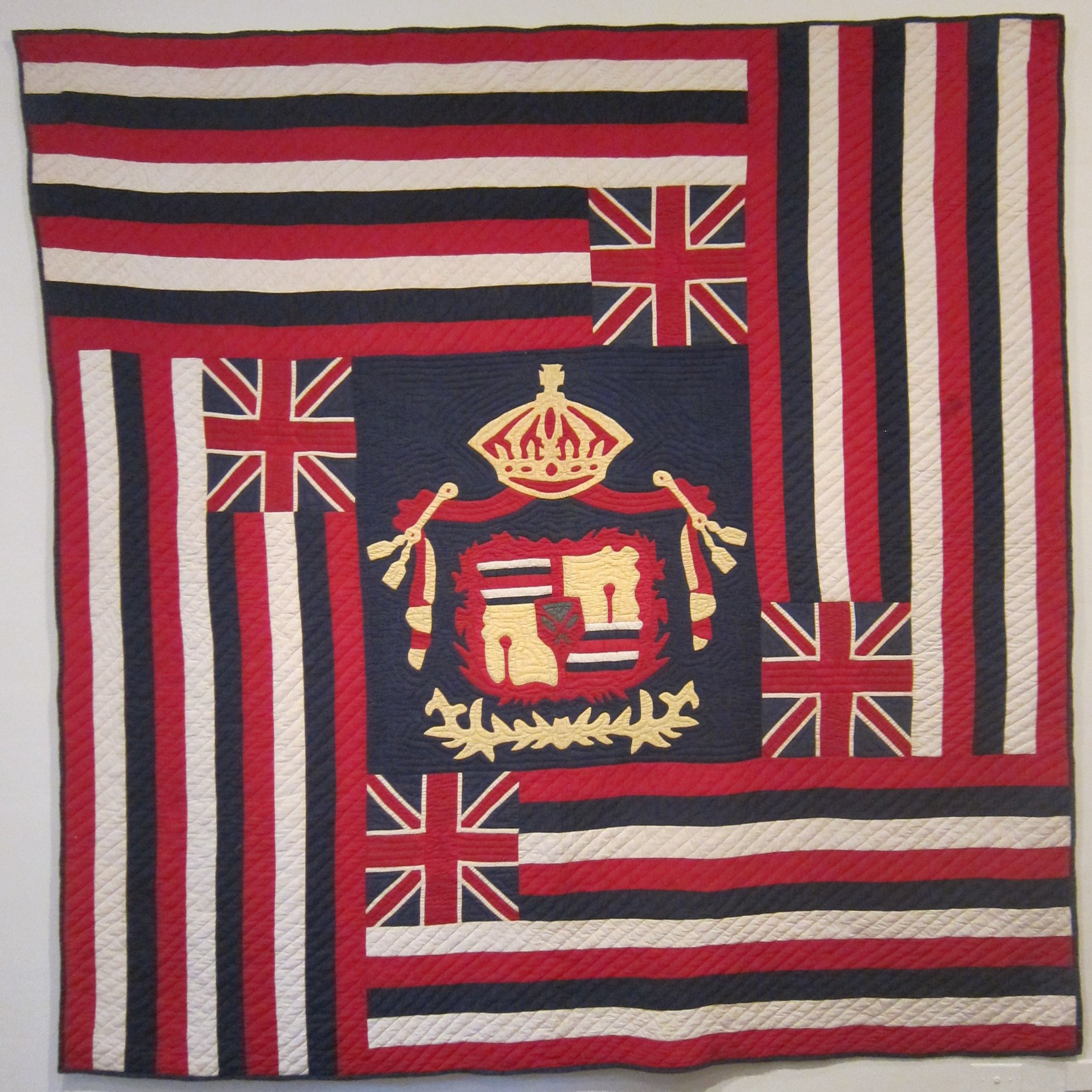
Hawaiian quilt from Waimea, created before 1918.

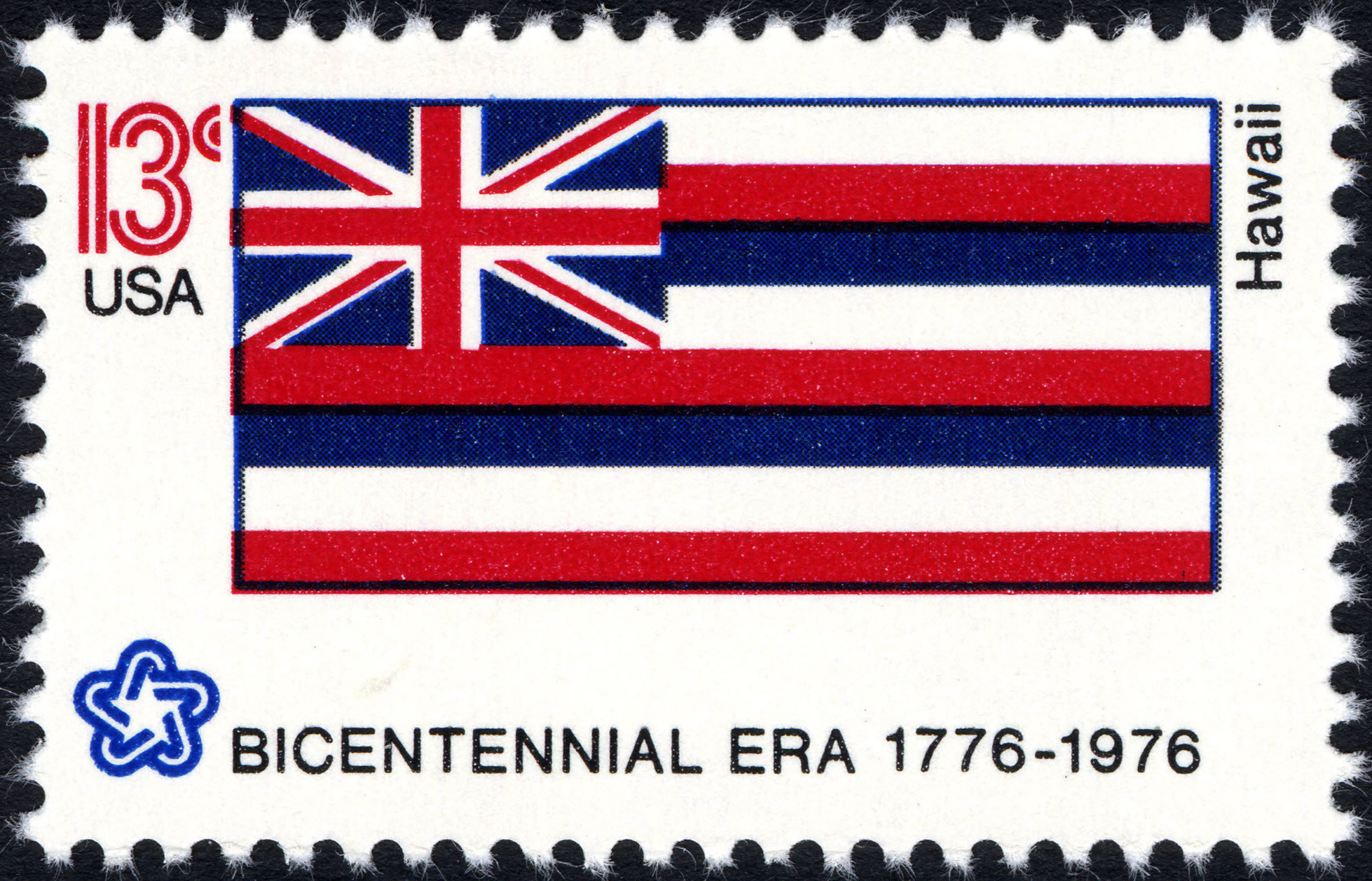
The Hawaii state flag as depicted in a 1976 postage stamp series.

In 2001, a survey conducted by the North American Vexillological Association (NAVA) placed Hawaii's flag 11th in design quality, out of the 72 U.S. and Canadian provincial, state, and territorial flags ranked.

== History ==
=== Before 1816 ===
Captain George Vancouver of the British Royal Navy visited the Hawaiian Islands on three occasions during his 1791 to 1795 expedition. At this time, the Hawaiian Islands were divided among several warring chiefdoms. In February 1794, while at anchorage in Kealakekua Bay off the Hawaiʻi island, Vancouver reached a diplomatic agreement with the king (or aliʻi) of that island, Kamehameha, who would later unite all the Hawaiian islands and become the first ruler of the Kingdom of Hawaiʻi. Vancouver believed that the agreement reached meant Hawaiʻi island was being ceded to Great Britain, but historians have argued that the Hawaiians saw the agreement as establishing a protectorate. After the proceedings on Vancouver's vessel, a British flag was presented, taken ashore and raised. The flag was either a British Union Jack, or a Red Ensign as used by the Royal Navy, which features a Union Jack in the canton. (Note: Vancouver's journal ambiguously describes the presented flag as "the British colours".) In 1801, the British Union Jack added a Saint Patrick's Cross when Ireland joined with Great Britain in a political union. Both pre- and post-1801 versions of the Red Ensign served as the unofficial flag of the Kingdom of Hawaiʻi until 1816.

There is an unverified anecdote that, during the War of 1812 (fought between the United Kingdom and the United States from 1812 to 1815), Kamehameha became aware of the nationalist meaning of flags. To avoid offending either side, he designed a new flag for his kingdom which combined elements of both the British Union Jack and the flag of the United States.

Red Ensign of Great Britain (1707–1800)

Flag of the United States in 1815 with 15 stars and stripes

=== 1816–1845 ===
Flag of the East India Company

One version of the flag with a 1:2 canton and 9 stripes

In April 1816, Kamehameha purchased a brig from Scottish Captain Alexander Adams, and arranged for Adams to take command of the ship, which was renamed Kaʻahumanu after the wife of Kamehameha. As part of the transfer ceremony, Adams wrote that he was "honored to take command under the Flag of His Majesty" though he does not describe the flag. The next year, in March 1817, the Kaʻahumanu became the first Hawaiian vessel to sail to a foreign port (Canton, China) under a "distinct" Hawaiian flag. In one source, this is described as: "A St. George and St. Andrews Cross in the corner filled in with blue, with field consisting of red and white stripes" which virtually matches the ensign of the East India Company though another source describes "red, white and blue stripes added to a Union Jack".

An alternative account attributes the Hawaiian flag to English sea captain George Charles Beckley, an adviser to Kamehameha I. In 1898, historian William DeWitt Alexander noted that Adams's journal showed a Hawaiian flag already in use when he entered Kamehameha's service in 1816, casting doubt on the tradition that Adams designed it. Alexander attributed the flag to Beckley but considered the Beckley family tradition dating its creation to 1806 or 1807 at least six years too early. Beckley's granddaughter, Mary Jane Fayerweather Montano, also related the family tradition crediting him with the flag. Her son-in-law, Albert Pierce Taylor, recorded that the family dated Beckley's creation of the flag to 1806 or 1807 and that Beckley's logbook, which reportedly documented its creation, had since been lost. William Drake Westervelt likewise credited Beckley with designing and making the flag. In Taylor's and Westervelt's accounts, Beckley designed the flag and Adams subsequently carried it aboard the Kaʻahumanu. The family tradition also held that the original pattern flag was made into a frock worn by Beckley's children and preserved as an heirloom.

The Russian navigator Vasily Golovnin, based on a visit to Oʻahu in 1818, describes seeing a "national flag" which "consists of seven stripes: red, white, blue, red, white, blue and red, with the English Union Jack in the corner".

Until 1845, visitors to the Hawaiian Islands reported various versions of the flag with different numbers of stripes and colors.

=== 1845–present ===
State flag (1845–present)

In 1843, either as an inadvertent mistake, or as a symbolic "reversal" gesture in the wake of the Paulet affair – a five-month-long, unofficial occupation of Hawaii by a British naval officer – the flag design was specified to have eight stripes: a white stripe on top followed by the sequence red, blue, white, red, blue, white, red. This new flag was officially unfurled on May 25, 1845, at the opening of the legislative council and remains the same design as used today.

== Lā Hae Hawaiʻi ==
In 1990, Governor of Hawaii John Waiheʻe proclaimed July 31 to be Lā Hae Hawaiʻi, the Hawaiian Flag Day. It has been celebrated each year since then. It is the same date as Lā Hoʻihoʻi Ea, Sovereignty Restoration Day, a holiday of the Kingdom of Hawaiʻi that is celebrated by proponents of the Hawaiian sovereignty movement.

== Chronology ==
Date	Flag	Image
1793–1800	British Red Ensign	
1801–1816	British Red Ensign following the Acts of Union with Ireland	
1816–1845	Early version of the present flag (1:2 canton)	
February 1843 – July 1843	Union Flag (during the Paulet Affair)	
1845–present	The current Hawaiian flag was introduced in 1845 (4:7 canton, white stripe at the top). This design was retained through the overthrow of the Hawaiian Kingdom, the Republic of Hawaii, the annexation of Hawaii by the United States, and finally the admission of Hawaii as a US state	

== Other flags ==
=== Flag of the Governor ===
The flag used by the governor of Hawaii is a red and blue bicolor. In the middle of the eight white stars appears the name of the state in all capital letters. During the time Hawaii was a United States territory, the letters in the middle of the flag were "TH", which stood for "Territory of Hawaii".

Standard of the governor before statehood in 1959

Standard of the governor of Hawaii

=== Kānaka Maoli flag ===
Gene Simeona's Kānaka Maoli flag, introduced in 2001

The Kānaka Maoli ('true people' in the Hawaiian language) design is purported by some to be the original flag of the Kingdom of Hawaiʻi, though this claim is unverified and widely disputed. It was introduced to the public by Gene Simeona in 2001. It has nine alternating stripes of green, red, and yellow defaced with a green shield with a puela (strip of kapa bark cloth insignia flown atop the double-hulled canoe of the chief) crossed by two paddles.

Gene Simeona claims to have unearthed the Kānaka Maoli flag in 1999. Simeona said he encountered a descendant of Lord George Paulet who told him about an earlier flag. Simeona claims to have found evidence of the Kānaka Maoli flag in the state archives, though any sources he may have used have not been identified. Subsequent efforts to verify Simeona's claim have been unsuccessful. Critics of the claim have pointed to evidence of the widely accepted Hawaiian flag being in existence before the Kānaka Maoli flag.

Flag designed by Louis Agard in 1993, eight years before the Kānaka Maoli flag appeared on public record.

Louis "Buzzy" Agard had proposed a Hawaiian flag design in 1993 which featured nine alternating stripes and the same charge as on the Kānaka Maoli flag, leading many to believe it is where Simeona drew his inspiration.

Despite the lack of verification about its historic use, the design is popular among those who prefer its lack of apparent colonial imagery.

== Gallery ==
Personal Standard of King Kalākaua

Personal Standard of Princess Kaʻiulani

Naval Ensign of the Kingdom of Hawaiʻi, with the only known use of this flag being on the Kaimiloa

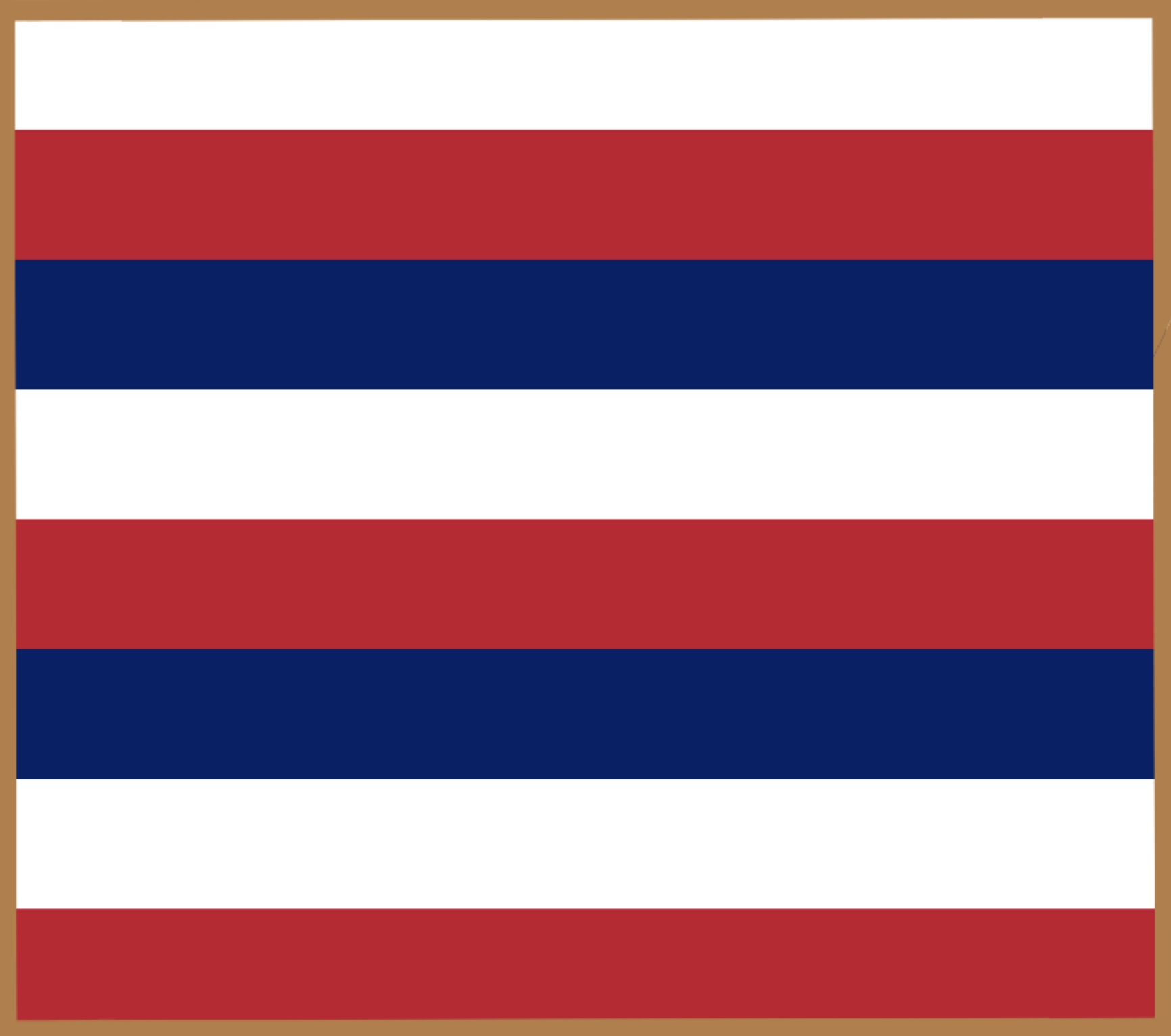
Naval Jack of the Kingdom of Hawaiʻi, flown on the bowsprit of the Kaimiloa

Flag of the Kuhina Nui in the Kingdom of Hawaiʻi

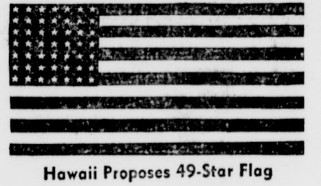
Proposed 49 star American flag from 1941

The inverted Hawaiian flag represents the Kingdom of Hawaiʻi in distress and has served as the main symbol of the Hawaiian sovereignty movement

Flag of the Hawaiian people used in Unrepresented Nations and Peoples Organization

Flag of the Nation of Hawaiʻi movement

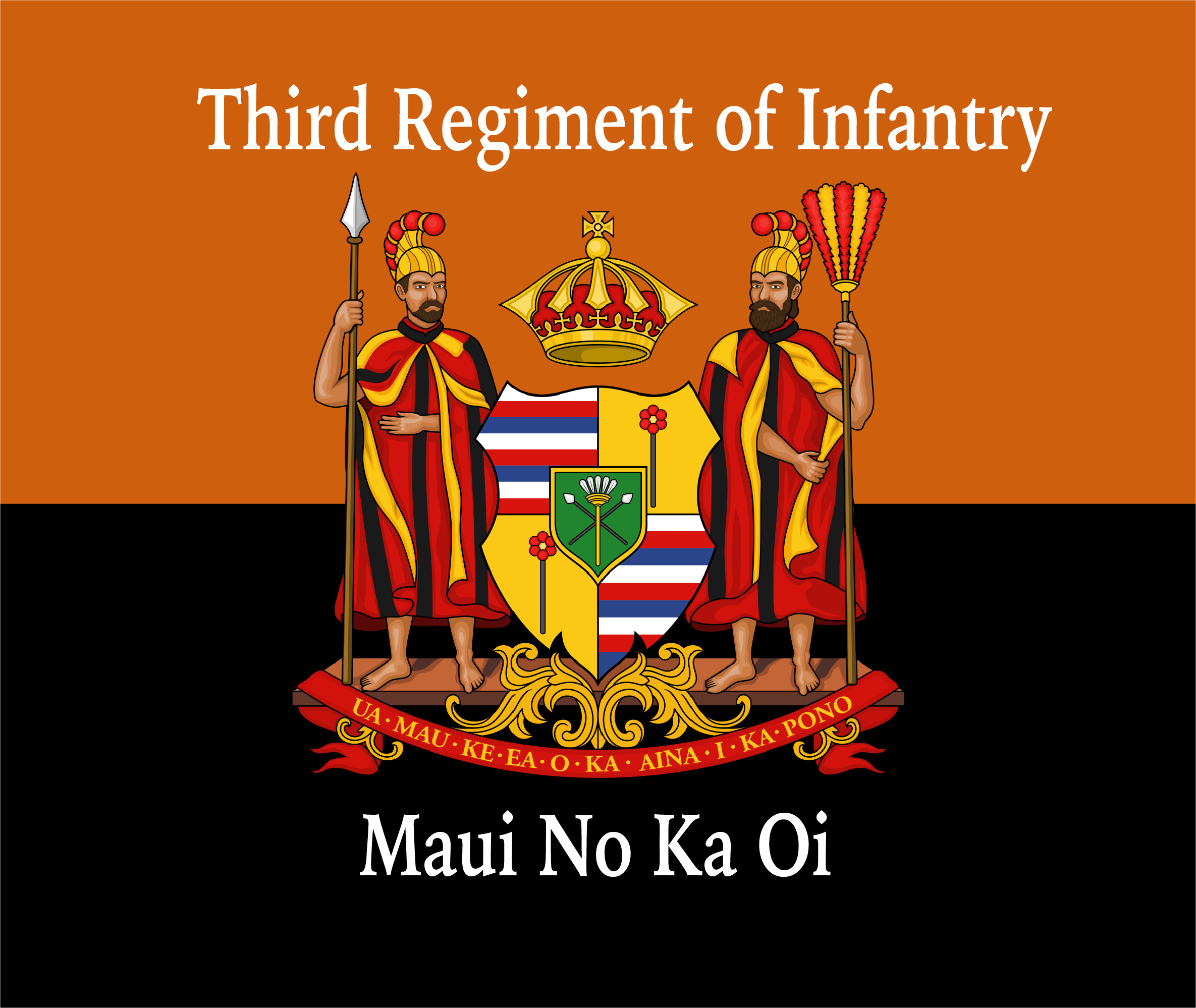
Digital reconstruction of the flag carried by Hawaii's National Guard, 1916

== See also ==
- Coat of arms of the Kingdom of Hawaiʻi
- Seal of Hawaii
- List of flags by design
- List of Hawaii state symbols
- List of U.S. state, district, and territorial insignia
