= He Mele Lāhui Hawaiʻi =

National anthem of Kingdom of Hawaii (1866–1876)

English: Song of the Hawaiian Nation
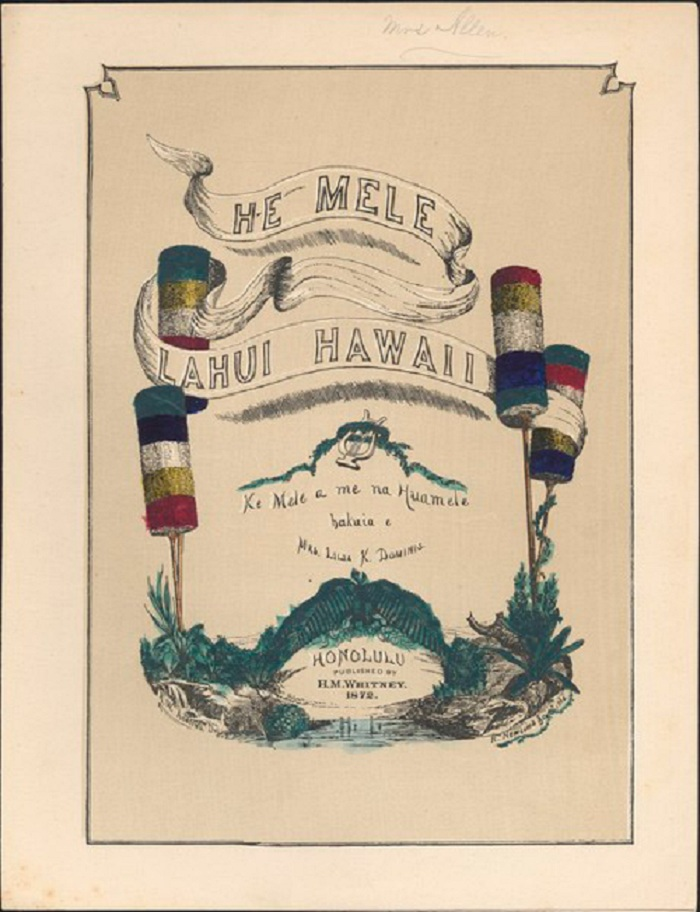
- National anthem of the Kingdom of Hawaii
- Lyrics: Lydia Kamakaʻeha Dominis
- Music: Lydia Kamakaʻeha Dominis
- Adopted: 1866
- Relinquished: 1876

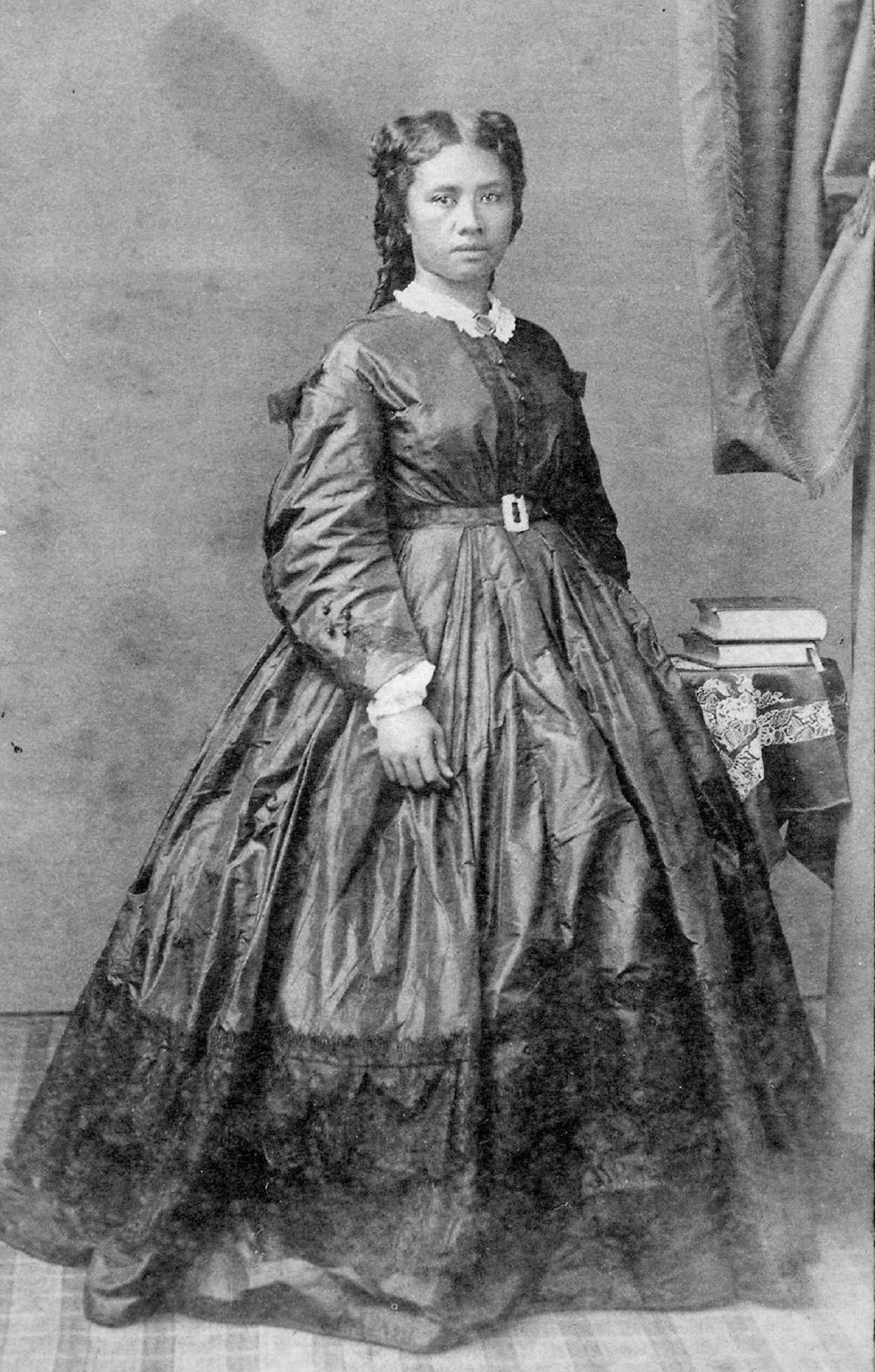
Lydia Kamakaʻeha in 1865

"He Mele Lāhui Hawaiʻi" ("Song of the Hawaiian Nation") was composed by Liliʻuokalani in November 1866 at the request of Kamehameha V, who wanted a national anthem to replace the British anthem "God Save the King". It replaced Lunalilo's composition "E Ola Ke Aliʻi Ke Akua" as the national anthem. Liliʻuokalani wrote: "The king was present for the purpose of Criticising my new composition of both words and music, and was liberal in his commendations to me on my success. He admired not only the beauty of the music but spoke enthusiastically of the appropriate words, so well adapted to the air and to the purpose for which they were written. This remained in use as our national anthem for some twenty years or more when my brother composed the words Hawaiʻi Ponoʻī."

Liliʻuokalani's memoir, Hawaii's Story by Hawaii's Queen, stated: "In the early years of the reign of Kamehameha V. he brought to my notice the fact that the Hawaiian people had no national air. Each nation, he said, but ours had its statement of patriotism and love of country in its own music; but we were using for that purpose on state occasions the time-honored British anthem, "God save the Queen."

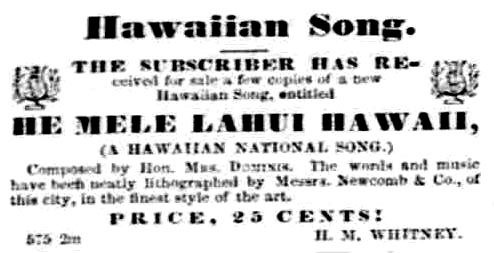
An advertisement for the He Mele Lahui Hawaii that appeared in the Pacific Commercial Advertiser on June 8, 1867

By July 1867, the song was printed and was available for purchase in Honolulu, becoming the first of her compositions ever published. This decidedly Christian song served as the national anthem for ten years until her brother, by that time reigning as King Kalākaua, set it aside in favor of his own composition, "Hawaiʻi Ponoʻī", in 1876.

== Lyrics ==
Ka Makua mana loa
Maliu mai iā mākou
E hāliu aku nei
Me ka naʻau haʻahaʻa
E mau ka maluhia
O nei pae ʻāina
Mai Hawaiʻi a Niʻihau
Ma lalo o kou malu

Hui:
E mau ke ea o ka ʻāina
Ma kou pono mau
A ma kou mana nui
E ola e ola ka mōʻī

E ka haku mālama mai
I ko mākou nei mōʻī
E mau kona noho ʻana
Maluna o ka noho aliʻi
Hāʻawi mai i ke aloha
Maloko a kona naʻau
A ma kou ahonui
E ola e ola ka mōʻī
Hoʻoho e mau ke

Ma lalo o kou aloha nui
Nā Liʻi o ke Aupuni
Me nā makaʻāinana
Ka lehulehu nō a pau
Kiaʻi mai iā lākou
Me ke aloha ahonui
E ola nō mākou
I kou mana mau
E mau ke ea

Translation:

Almighty Father bend thine ear
And listen to a nation's prayer
That lowly bows before thy throne
And seeks thy fostering care
Grant your peace throughout the land
Over these sunny sea girt isles
From Hawaiʻi to Niʻihau,
And on our sovereign smile

Chorus:
Grant your peace throughout the land
Over these sunny isles
Keep the nations life, oh Lord
And upon our sovereign smile

Guard him with your tender care
Give him length of years to reign
On the throne his fathers won
Bless the nation once again
Give the king your loving grace
And with wisdom from on high
Prosperous lead his people on
As beneath your watchful eye
Grant your peace throughout the land

Bless O Lord our country's chiefs
Grant them wisdom so to live
That our people may be saved
And to You the glory give
Watch over us day by day
King and people with your love
For our hope is all in You
Bless us, You who reign above
Grant your peace throughout the land

== See also ==
- Compositions by Liliʻuokalani

Preceded by E Ola Ke Aliʻi Ke Akua	National Anthem of the Kingdom of Hawaiʻi; 1866-1876	Succeeded by Hawaiʻi Ponoʻī
