= Hawaiʻi Ponoʻī =

Anthem of the U.S. state of Hawaii

English: Hawaii's Own
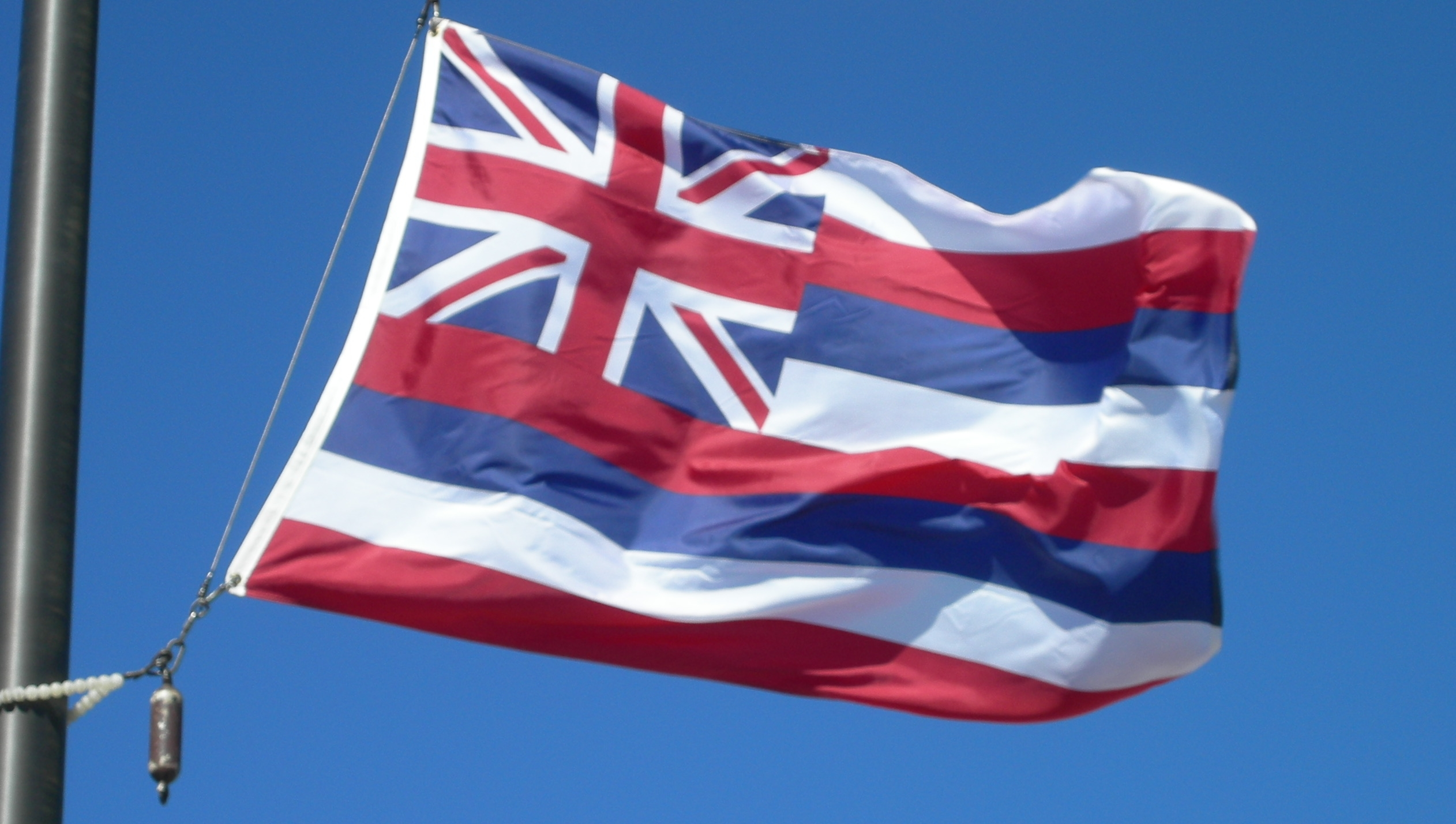
- State anthem of Hawaii Former national anthem of the Kingdom of Hawaii; Republic of Hawaii
- Lyrics: King David Kalākaua, 1874
- Music: Captain Henri Berger
- Adopted: 1876; 150 years ago

Audio sample
- Digital performance: file; help

"Hawaiʻi Ponoʻī" ("Hawaii's Own") is the anthem of the U.S. state of Hawaii. It previously served as the national anthem of the independent Hawaiian Kingdom during the late 19th century, as well as the Republic of Hawaii, and has continued to be Hawaii's official anthem ever since annexation by the United States in 1898.

== History ==
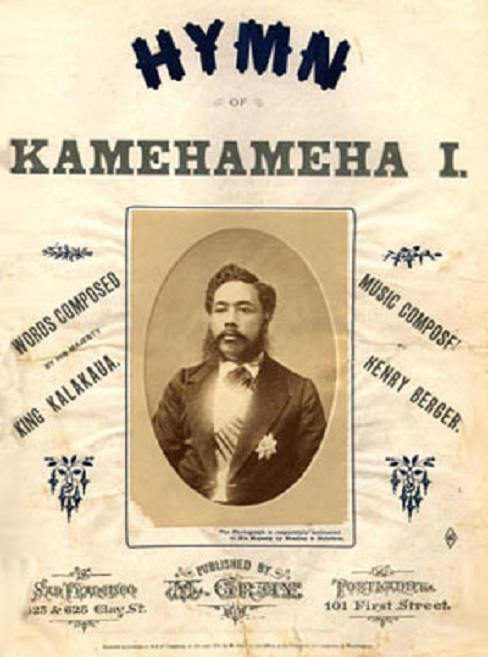
King Kalākaua, Hawaii's penultimate monarch and the author of the song's lyrics.

The words were written in 1874 by King David Kalākaua with music composed by Captain Henri Berger, then the king's royal bandmaster. "Hawaiʻi Ponoʻī" is one of the national anthems of the Kingdom of Hawaiʻi and also was the national anthem of the Republic of Hawaiʻi.

It was adopted as the national anthem in 1876, replacing Liliʻuokalani's composition "He Mele Lāhui Hawaiʻi". It was the adopted song of the Territory of Hawaiʻi before becoming the state symbol by an act of the Hawaiʻi State Legislature in 1967. The melody is reminiscent of "God Save the King" and the Prussian anthem "Heil dir im Siegerkranz". "Hawaiʻi Ponoʻī" is commonly sung at sporting events in Hawaii, immediately after the U.S. national anthem. It is sung at many local schools and local service organization meetings and events.

== Lyrics ==
Hawaiian original

Hawaiʻi ponoʻī
Nānā i kou mōʻī
Ka lani aliʻi
Ke aliʻi.

Hui:
Makua lani ē,
Kamehameha ē,
Na kāua e pale
Me ka ihe.

Hawaiʻi ponoʻī
Nānā i nā aliʻi
Nā pua muli kou (Note: Originally "Nā pua kou muli".)
Nā pōkiʻi.

Hui

Hawaiʻi ponoʻī
E ka lāhui ē
ʻO kāu hana nui
E ui ē.

Hui

IPA transcription (Note: See Help:IPA/Hawaiian and Hawaiian phonology.)

[hə.ˈʋɐj.ʔi po.no.ˈʔiː]
[naː.ˈnaː i ˈkow moː.ˈʔiː]
[kə ˈlɐ.ni ə.ˈli.ʔi]
[ke ə.ˈli.ʔi]

[ˈhu.wi]
[mə.ˈku.wə ˈlɐ.ni eː]
[kə.me.hə.ˈmɛ.hə eː]
[nə ˈkaː.wə e ˈpɐ.le]
[me kə ˈi.he]

[hə.ˈʋɐj.ʔi po.no.ˈʔiː]
[naː.ˈnaː i naː ə.ˈli.ʔi]
[naː ˈpu.wə ˈmu.li ˈkow]
[naː poː.ˈki.ʔi]

[ˈhu.wi]

[hə.ˈʋɐj.ʔi po.no.ˈʔiː]
[e kə laː.ˈhu.wi eː]
[ʔo ˈkaː.wu ˈhɐ.nə ˈn(u.)wi]
[e ˈu.wi eː]

[ˈhu.wi]

English translation

Hawaii's own,
Loyal to thy king be.
Thine only ruling chief,
Thy liege and lord.

Chorus:
Royal father,
Kamehameha.
We shall defend,
With the spear.

Hawaii's own,
Honor give to thy chiefs,
Of kindred race are we,
Younger descent.

Chorus

Hawaii's own,
People of this our land,
Duty calls fealty,
Guide in the right.

Chorus

== Resources ==
- Huapala ~ Hawaiian Music and Hula Archives ~ recording of melody available at website

Preceded by He Mele Lāhui Hawaiʻi	National anthem of the Kingdom of Hawaiʻi; 1876-1893	Monarchy overthrown
