= Crown of Hawaii =

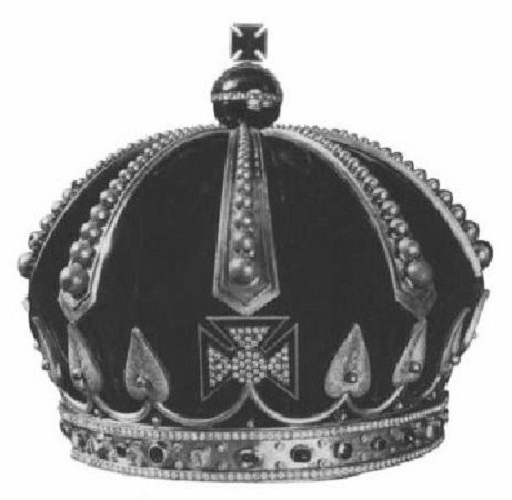
- Crown used by king Kalākaua

Heraldic depictions

Details
- Country: Kingdom of Hawaii

Crown of Hawaii was a royal crown used by the Hawaiian king Kalākaua. The idea of a European-styled coronation and thus also a crown came to Kalākaua after his world tour. Crowns for both the king and queen were ordered from a London-based jeweller.

The crown was made out of gold with nearly an oval profile. It was decorated with golden kalo (taro) leaves as well as diamonds and other jewels. On the top there was a Maltese cross. The price of the crown came into $5000.

== See also ==
- Royal Order of the Crown of Hawaii
