= Hawaiian Kingdom =

Country in the Pacific Ocean (1795–1893)

Hawaiian Kingdom Ke Aupuni Hawai‘i (Hawaiian)
- 1795–1893
- Flag Coat of arms
- Motto: Ua Mau ke Ea o ka ʻĀina i ka Pono; "The life of the land is perpetuated in righteousness"
- Anthem: E Ola Ke Aliʻi Ke Akua (until 1866); He Mele Lāhui Hawaiʻi (1866–1876); Hawaiʻi Ponoʻī (1876–1898)
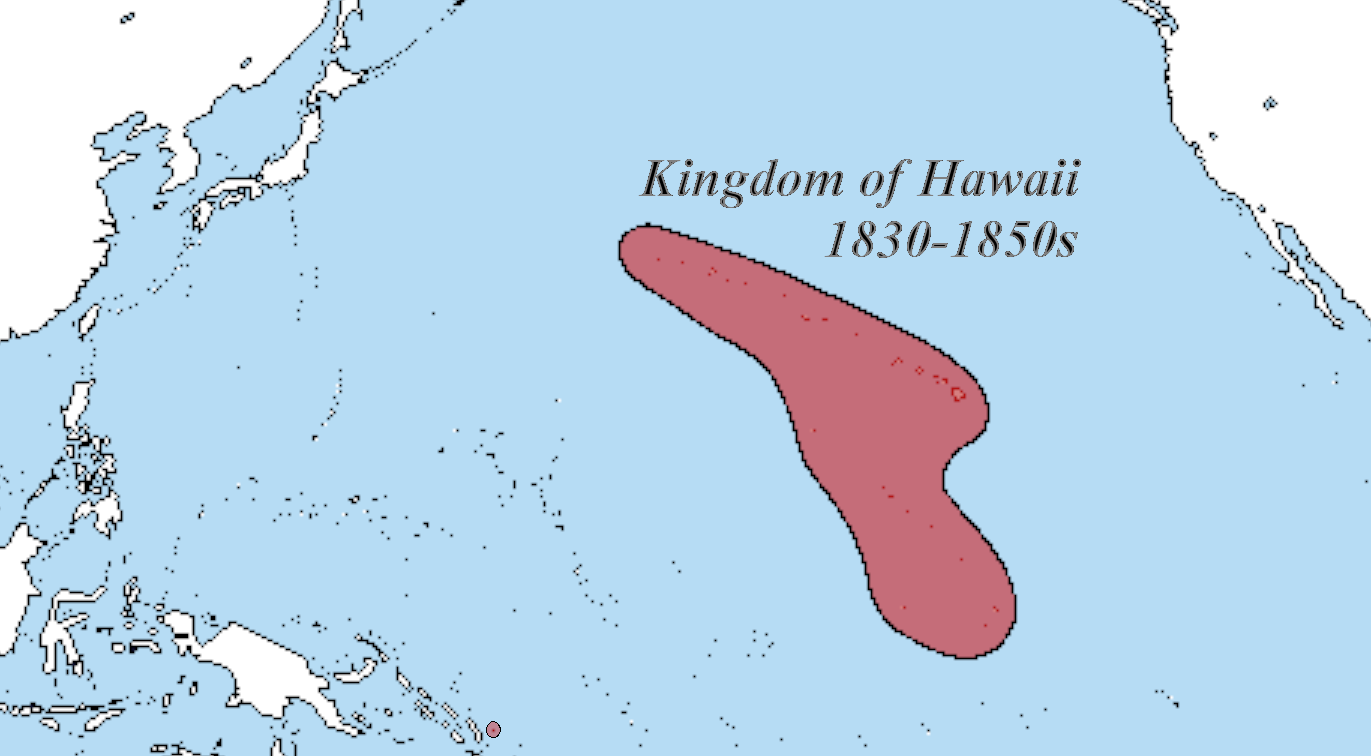
- Capital: Waikīkī / Honolulu / Kailua-Kona (following the movements of Kamehameha I (1795–1820); Lāhainā (1820–1845); Honolulu (1845–1893)
- Common languages: Hawaiian, English
- Religion: Hawaiian religion (1795–1819); Church of Hawaii (1862–1893)
- Demonym: Hawaiian
- Government: Absolute monarchy (1795–1840); Constitutional monarchy (1840–1893)
- Monarch
  - 1795–1819 (first): Kamehameha I
  - 1891–1893 (last): Liliʻuokalani
- Kuhina Nui
  - 1819–1832 (first): Kaʻahumanu
  - 1863–1864 (last): Kekūanaōʻa
- Legislature: Legislature
  - Upper house: House of Nobles
  - Lower house: House of Representatives
- History
  - Inception: May, 1795
  - Unification of Hawaii: March/April 1810
  - Constitutional monarchy: October 8, 1840
  - Partial occupation by the United Kingdom: February 25 – July 31, 1843
  - Anglo-Franco Proclamation: November 28, 1843
  - Partial occupation by France: August 22, 1849 – September 5, 1849
  - Monarchy overthrown: January 17, 1893
  - Forced abdication of Queen Liliʻuokalani: January 24, 1895

Population
  - 1780: 400,000–800,000
  - 1800: 250,000
  - 1832: 130,313
  - 1890: 89,990
- Currency: Hawaiian dollar (since 1847)
Preceded by	Succeeded by
Ancient Hawaii	Provisional Government of Hawaii
- Today part of: United States; Hawaii

The Hawaiian Kingdom, also known as the Kingdom of Hawaiʻi (Hawaiian: Ke Aupuni Hawaiʻi [kɛ ɐwˈpuni həˈvɐjʔi]), was an archipelagic country from 1795 to 1893, which eventually encompassed all of the inhabited Hawaiian Islands. It was established in 1795 when Kamehameha I, then Aliʻi nui of Hawaii, conquered the islands of Oʻahu, Maui, Molokaʻi, and Lānaʻi, and unified them under one government. In 1810, the Hawaiian Islands were fully unified when the islands of Kauaʻi and Niʻihau voluntarily joined the Hawaiian Kingdom. Two major dynastic families ruled the kingdom, the House of Kamehameha and the House of Kalākaua.

The kingdom subsequently gained diplomatic recognition from European powers and the United States. An influx of European and American explorers, traders, and whalers soon began arriving to the kingdom, introducing diseases such as syphilis, tuberculosis, smallpox, and measles, leading to the rapid decline of the Native Hawaiian population. In 1887, King Kalākaua was forced to accept a new constitution after a coup d'état by the Honolulu Rifles, a volunteer military unit recruited from American settlers. Queen Liliʻuokalani, who succeeded Kalākaua in 1891, tried to abrogate the new constitution. She was subsequently overthrown in a 1893 coup engineered by the Committee of Safety, a group of Hawaiian subjects who were mostly of American descent, and supported by the U.S. military. The Committee of Safety dissolved the kingdom and established the Republic of Hawaii, intending for the U.S. to annex the islands, which it did on July 7, 1898, via the Newlands Resolution. Hawaii became part of the U.S. as the Territory of Hawaii until it became a U.S. state in 1959.

In 1993, the United States Senate passed the Apology Resolution, which apologized "for the overthrow of the Kingdom of Hawaii on January 17, 1893 with the participation of agents and citizens of the United States" and acknowledged that "the indigenous Hawaiian people never directly relinquished their claims to their inherent sovereignty as a people or over their national lands to the United States, either through their monarchy or through a plebiscite or referendum." Opposition to the U.S. annexation of Hawaii played a major role in the creation of the Hawaiian sovereignty movement, which calls for Hawaiian independence from American rule.

== History ==
=== Origin ===
Hawaii was originally settled by Polynesian voyagers from the Marquesas Islands or Tahiti. The date of their first arrival is uncertain. Early archaeological studies suggested they may have arrived as early as the 3rd century CE, while more recent analyses suggest that they did not arrive until around 900–1200 CE. The islands were governed as independent chiefdoms.

In ancient Hawaiʻi, society was divided into multiple classes. Rulers came from the aliʻi class with each island ruled by a separate aliʻi nui. These rulers were believed to come from a hereditary line descended from the first Polynesian, Papa, who became the earth mother goddess of the Hawaiian religion. Captain James Cook was the first European to encounter the Hawaiian Islands, on his Pacific third voyage (1776–1780). He was killed at Kealakekua Bay on Hawaiʻi Island in 1779 in a dispute over the taking of a longboat. Three years later the island passed to Kalaniʻōpuʻu's son, Kīwalaʻō, while religious authority was passed to the ruler's nephew, Kamehameha.

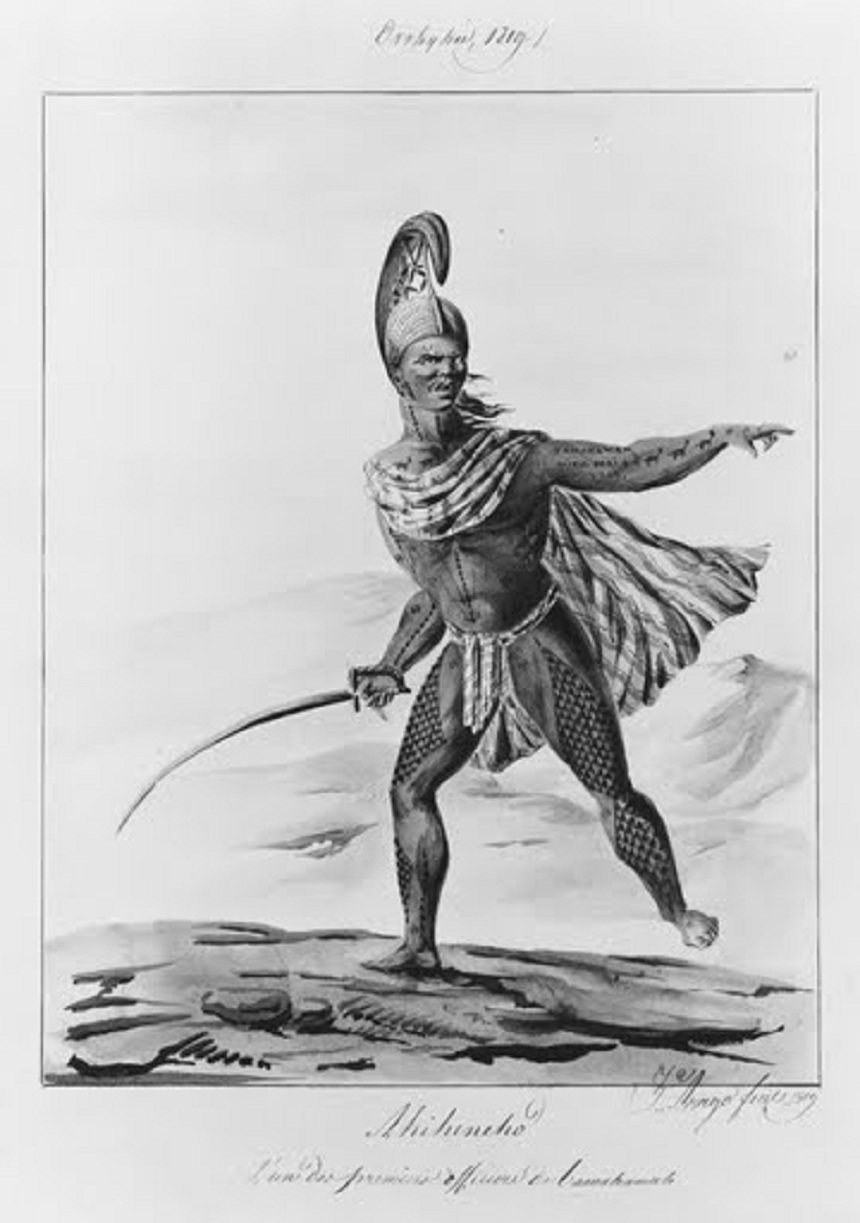
Hawaiian military officer, 1819 (by Jacques Arago).

In 1782, the warrior chief who became Kamehameha the Great, started a military campaign to unite the islands that would last 15 years. He established the Hawaiian Kingdom in 1795 with the help of western weapons and advisors, such as John Young and Isaac Davis. Although successful in attacking both Oʻahu and Maui, he failed to annex Kauaʻi, hampered by a storm and a plague that decimated his army. In 1810 Kauaʻi's chief swore allegiance to Kamehameha. The unification ended ancient Hawaiian society, transforming it into a constitutional monarchy in the manner of European systems. The Kingdom thus became an early example of monarchies in Polynesian societies as contacts with Europeans increased. Similar political developments occurred (for example) in Tahiti, Tonga, Fiji, and New Zealand (see the Māori King Movement).

=== Kamehameha dynasty (1795–1874) ===
From 1810 to 1893 two major dynastic families ruled the Hawaiian Kingdom: the House of Kamehameha (1795 to 1874) and the Kalākaua dynasty (1874–1893). Five members of the Kamehameha family led the government, each styled as Kamehameha, until 1872. Lunalilo (r. 1873–1874) was a member of the House of Kamehameha through his mother. Liholiho (Kamehameha II, r. 1819–1824) and Kauikeaouli (Kamehameha III, r. 1825–1854) were direct sons of Kamehameha the Great.

During Liholiho's (Kamehameha II) reign (1819–1824), the arrival of Christian missionaries and whalers accelerated changes in the kingdom.

Kauikeaouli's reign (1824–1854) as Kamehameha III, began as a young ward of the primary wife of Kamehameha the Great, Queen Kaʻahumanu, who ruled as Queen Regent and Kuhina Nui, or Prime Minister until her death in 1832. Kauikeaouli's rule of three decades was the longest in the monarchy's history. He enacted the Great Mahele of 1848, promulgated the first Constitution (1840) and its successor (1852) and witnessed cataclysmic losses of his people through imported diseases.

Alexander Liholiho, Kamehameha IV, (r. 1854–1863), introduced Anglican religion and royal habits to the kingdom.

Lot, Kamehameha V (r. 1863–1872), struggled to solidify Hawaiian nationalism in the kingdom.

=== Succession crisis and monarchical elections ===
Dynastic rule by the Kamehameha family ended in 1872 with the death of Kamehameha V. On his deathbed, he summoned High Chiefess Bernice Pauahi Bishop to declare his intentions of making her heir to the throne. Bernice refused the crown, and Kamehameha V died without naming an heir.

Bishop's refusal to take the crown forced the legislature to elect a new monarch. From 1872 to 1873, several relatives of the Kamehameha line were nominated. In the monarchical election of 1873, a ceremonial popular vote and a unanimous legislative vote, William C. Lunalilo, grandnephew of Kamehameha I, became Hawaiʻi's first of two elected monarchs. His reign ended due to his early death from tuberculosis at age 39.

Upon Lunalilo's death, David Kalakaua defeated Kamehameha IV's widow, Queen Emma, in a contested election, beginning the second dynasty.

=== Kalākaua dynasty ===
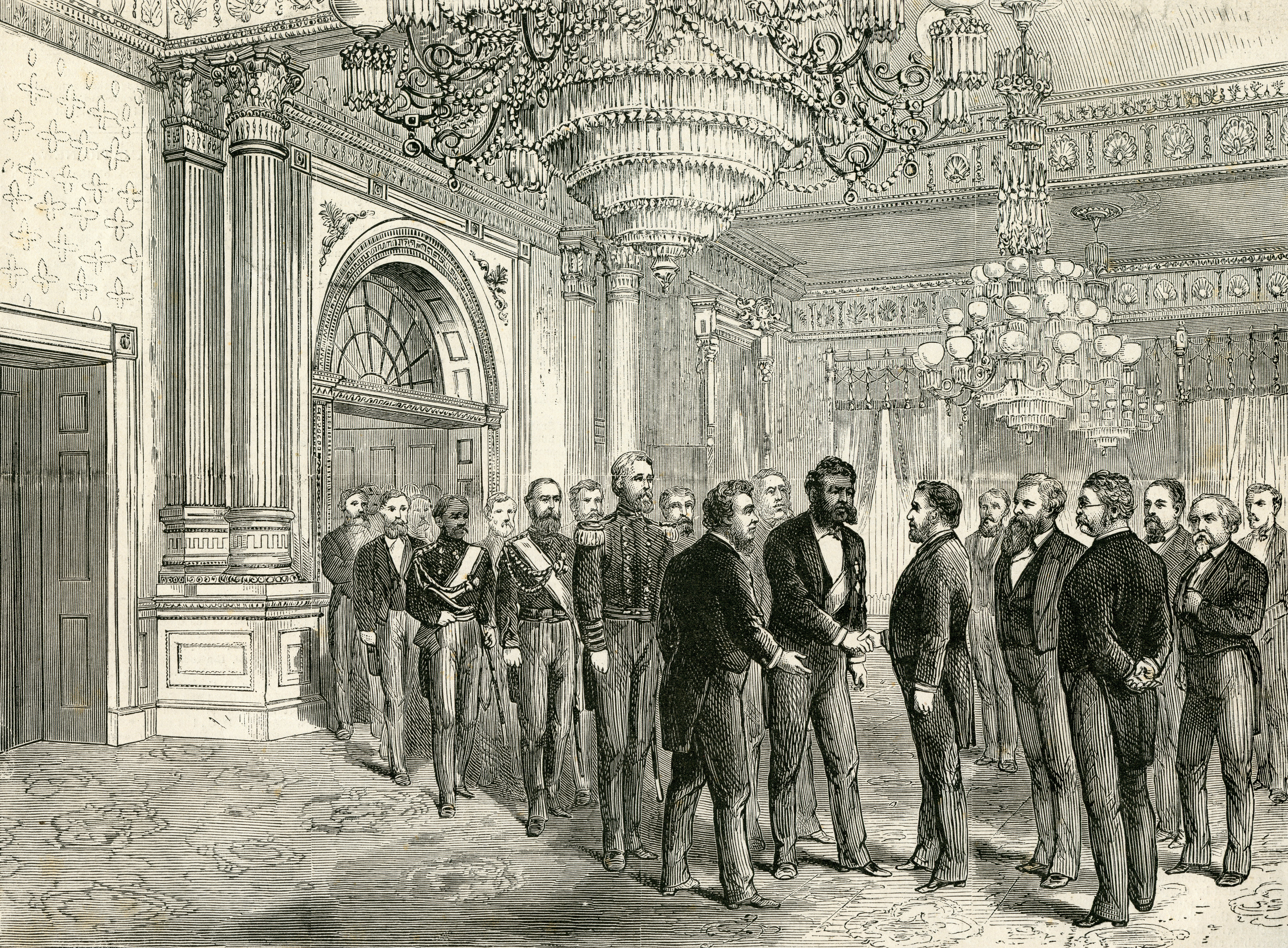
King Kalākaua meeting U.S. President Grant at the White House, 1874.

Like his predecessor, Lunalilo failed to name an heir to the throne. Once again, the legislature of the Hawaiian Kingdom held an election to fill the vacancy. Queen Emma, widow of Kamehameha IV, was nominated along with David Kalākaua. The 1874 election was a nasty campaign in which both candidates resorted to mudslinging and innuendo. Kalākaua became the second elected King of Hawaiʻi but without the ceremonial popular vote of Lunalilo. The choice was controversial, and U.S. and British troops were called upon to suppress rioting by Queen Emma's supporters, the Emmaites.

Kalākaua officially proclaimed that his sister, Liliʻuokalani, would succeed to the throne upon his death. Hoping to avoid uncertainty, Kalākaua listed a line of succession in his will, so that after Liliʻuokalani the throne should succeed to Princess Victoria Kaʻiulani, then to Queen Consort Kapiʻolani, followed by her sister Princess Poʻomaikelani, then Prince David Laʻamea Kawānanakoa, and finally Prince Jonah Kūhiō Kalanianaʻole. However, the will was not a proper proclamation according to kingdom law. Protests objected to nominating lower ranking aliʻi who were not eligible to the throne while high ranking aliʻi were available who were eligible, such as High Chiefess Elizabeth Kekaʻaniau. However, Queen Liliʻuokalani held the royal prerogative and she officially proclaimed her niece Princess Kaʻiulani as heir. She later proposed a new constitution in 1893, but it was never ratified by the legislature.

Kalākaua's prime minister Walter M. Gibson indulged the expenses of Kalākaua and attempted to establish a Polynesian Confederation, sending the "homemade battleship" Kaimiloa to Samoa in 1887. It resulted in suspicion by the German Navy.

==== Bayonet Constitution ====
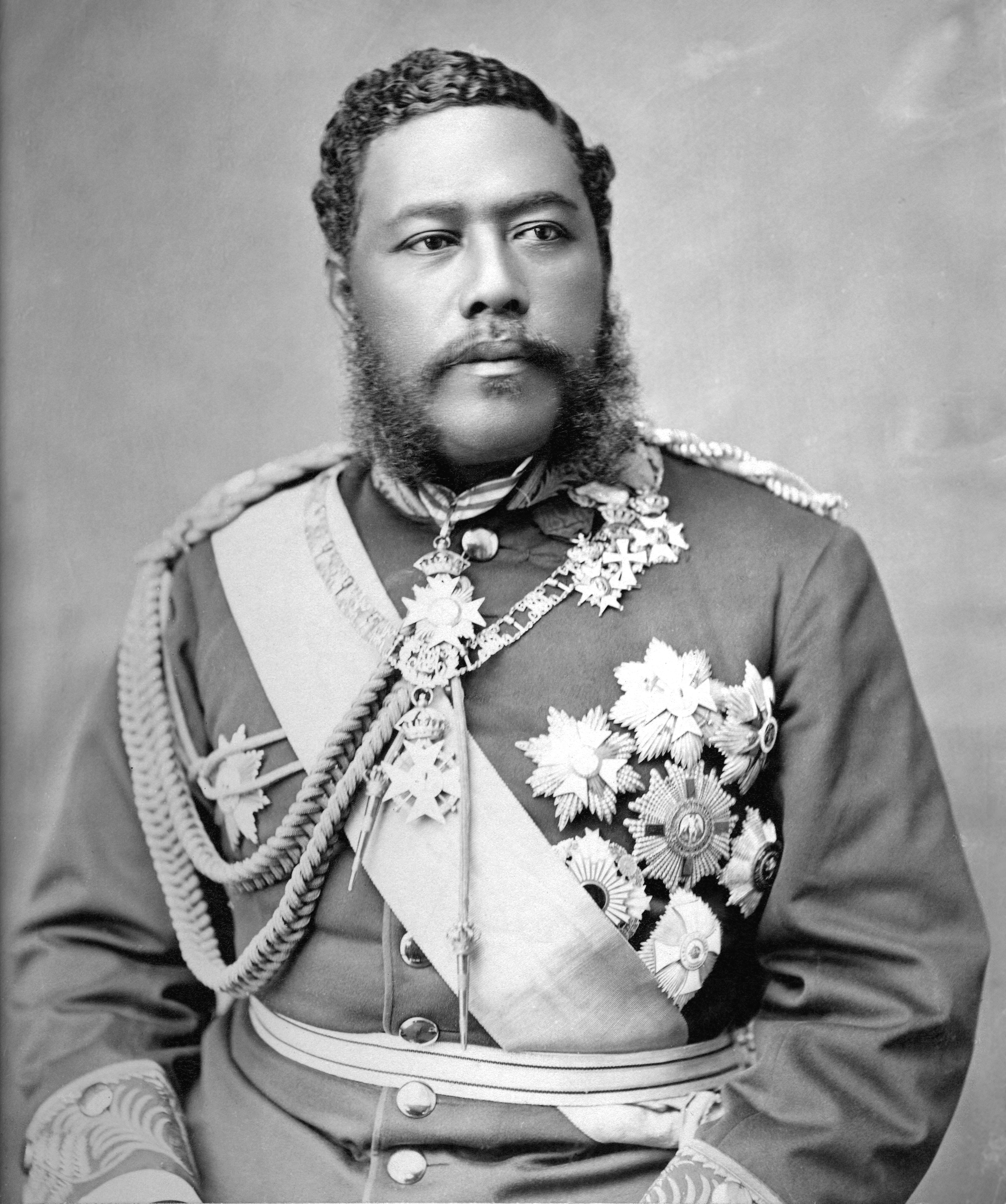
King Kalākaua.

The 1887 Constitution of the Hawaiian Kingdom was drafted by Lorrin A. Thurston, Minister of Interior under King Kalākaua. The constitution was proclaimed by the king after a meeting of 3,000 residents, including an armed militia demanded he sign or be deposed. The document created a constitutional monarchy like that of the United Kingdom, stripping the King of most of his personal authority, empowering the legislature and establishing a cabinet government. It became known as the "Bayonet Constitution" over the threat of force used to gain Kalākaua's cooperation.

The 1887 constitution empowered the citizenry to elect members of the House of Nobles (who had previously been appointed by the King). It increased the value of property a citizen must own to be eligible to vote above the previous Constitution of 1864. It also denied voting rights to Asians who comprised a large proportion of the population (a few Japanese and some Chinese who had previously become naturalized lost voting rights). This limited the franchise to wealthy native Hawaiians and Europeans. The Bayonet Constitution continued allowing the monarch to appoint cabinet ministers, but took his power to dismiss them without approval from the Legislature.

==== Liliʻuokalani's Constitution ====
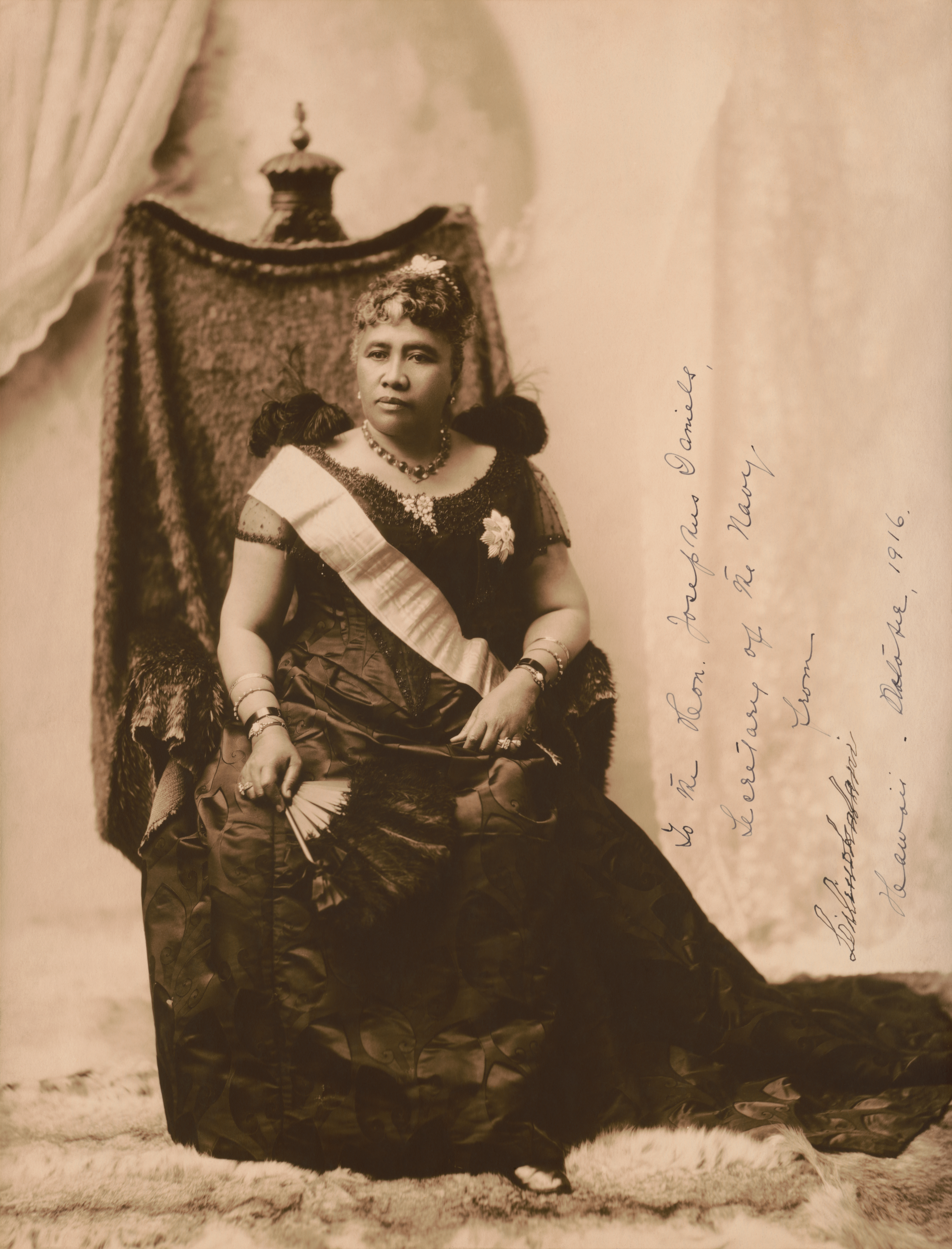
Liliʻuokalani.

In 1891, Kalākaua died and his sister Liliʻuokalani assumed the throne. She came to power during an economic crisis precipitated in part by the McKinley Tariff. By rescinding the Reciprocity Treaty of 1875, the new tariff eliminated the previous advantage Hawaiian exporters enjoyed in trade to U.S. markets. Many Hawaiian businesses and citizens felt the lost revenue, and so Liliʻuokalani proposed a lottery and opium licensing to bring in additional revenue. Her ministers and closest friends tried to dissuade her from pursuing the bills, and these controversial proposals were used against her in the looming constitutional crisis.

Liliʻuokalani wanted to restore power to the monarch by abrogating the 1887 Constitution. She launched a campaign resulting in a petition to proclaim a new Constitution. Many citizens and residents who in 1887 had forced Kalākaua to sign the "Bayonet Constitution" became alarmed when three of her cabinet members informed them that the queen was planning to unilaterally proclaim her new Constitution. Some members were reported to have feared for their safety for not supporting her plans.

==== Overthrow ====
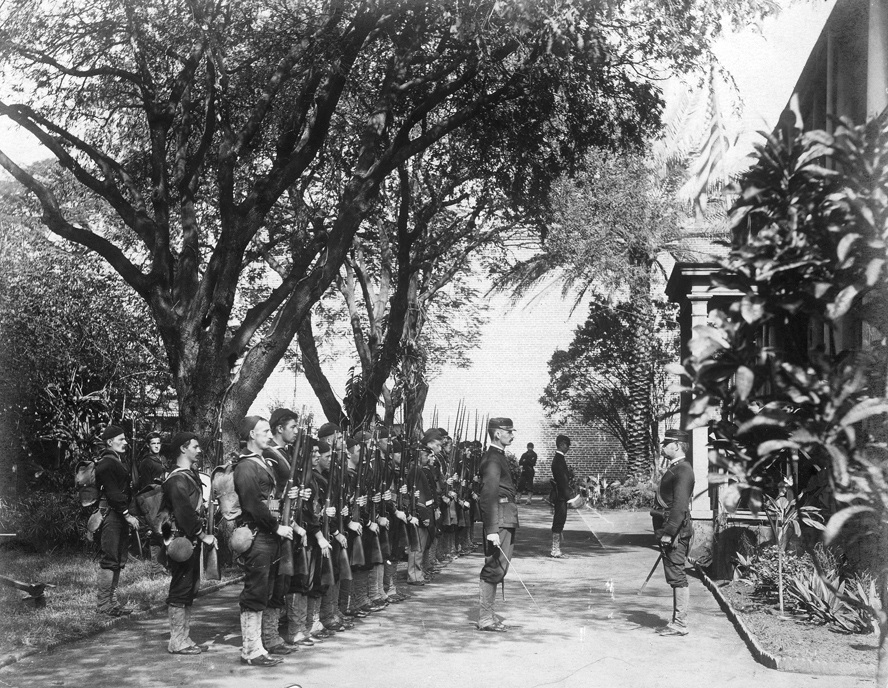
USS Boston's landing force on duty at the Arlington Hotel, Honolulu, at the time of the overthrow, January 1893.

In 1893, local businessmen and politicians, composed of six non-native Hawaiian Kingdom subjects, five American nationals, one British national, and one German national, all of whom were living in Hawaiʻi, formed the Committee of Safety and overthrew the regime and took over the government.

Historians suggest that businessmen were in favor of overthrow and annexation to the U.S. in order to benefit from more favorable trade conditions.

United States Government Minister John L. Stevens summoned a company of uniformed U.S. Marines from the USS Boston and two companies of U.S. sailors to Honolulu to take up positions at the U.S. Legation, Consulate and Arion Hall on the afternoon of January 16, 1893. This deployment was at the request of the Committee of Safety, which claimed an "imminent threat to American lives and property." Stevens was accused of ordering the landing on his own authority and inappropriately using his discretion. Historian William Russ concluded that "the injunction to prevent fighting of any kind made it impossible for the monarchy to protect itself."

On July 17, 1893, Sanford B. Dole and his committee took control of the government and declared itself the Provisional Government of Hawaii "to rule until annexation by the United States". Dole served as president. The committee and members of the former government both lobbied in Washington, D.C. for their respective positions.

President Grover Cleveland considered the overthrow to have been an illegal act of war; he refused to consider annexation and initially worked to restore the queen to her throne. Between December 14, 1893, and January 11, 1894, a standoff known as the Black Week occurred between the United States, the Empire of Japan and the United Kingdom against the Provisional Government to pressure them into returning the Queen. This incident drove home the message that President Cleveland wanted Queen Liliʻuokalani's return to power. On July 4, 1894, the Republic of Hawaii was requested to wait for the end of President Cleveland's second term.

While lobbying continued during 1894, supporters of the monarchy formed a sustained effort to restore Liliʻuokalani to the throne, called the Hawaiian royalist movement. The overthrow was opposed by many Native Hawaiians, who remained loyal to the Queen. From 1893 to 1894, royalists organized political resistance. Groups such as the Hui Aloha ʻĀina collected large petitions opposing annexation and supporting the monarchy. Despite this, the provisional government was reorganized as the Republic of Hawaii in 1894, further consolidating power and excluding royalist influence. Dole retained the position of president.

Tensions culminated in January 1895 with an armed royalist uprising led by Robert Wilcox. The royalist faction amassed an army 600 strong led by former Captain of the Guard Samuel Nowlein, and attempted to overthrow the republic and restore Queen Liliʻuokalani. Fighting took place around Honolulu, but the rebellion was quickly suppressed by government forces. Following the revolt, weapons linked to the uprising were discovered on the palace grounds, and the Queen was arrested. She was tried by a military tribunal of the Republic, convicted of knowledge of treason, and placed under permanent house arrest.

On January 24, 1895, while under house arrest Liliʻuokalani was forced to sign a five-page declaration as "Liliuokalani Dominis", not written by her, which states that she formally abdicated the throne. This was to be in return for the release and commutation of the death sentences of her jailed supporters, including Minister Joseph Nāwahī, Prince Kawānanakoa, Robert William Wilcox and Prince Jonah Kūhiō.

Before ascending the throne, for fourteen years, or since the date of my proclamation as heir apparent, my official title had been simply Liliuokalani. Thus I was proclaimed both Princess Royal and Queen. Thus it is recorded in the archives of the government to this day. The Provisional Government nor any other had enacted any change in my name. All my official acts, as well as my private letters, were issued over the signature of Liliuokalani. But when my jailers required me to sign ("Liliuokalani Dominis,") I did as they commanded. Their motive in this as in other actions was plainly to humiliate me before my people and before the world. I saw in a moment, what they did not, that, even were I not complying under the most severe and exacting duress, by this demand they had overreached themselves. There is not, and never was, within the range of my knowledge, any such a person as Liliuokalani Dominis.

It is a rule of common law that the acts of any person deprived of civil rights have no force nor weight, either at law or in equity; and that was my situation. ... but this act, obtained under duress, should have no weight with the authorities of the United States, to whom I appealed.

— Queen Liliuokalani, "Hawaii's Story By Hawaii's Queen"

Many royalists, including Wilcox, were imprisoned, though some were later pardoned. The failure of the 1895 rebellion effectively ended major royalist resistance. The Republic of Hawaii remained in control until 1898, when the Republic of Hawaii was dissolved and the Hawaiian Islands were annexed by the United States by the Joint Resolution to Provide for Annexing the Hawaiian Islands to the United States, known as the "Newlands Resolution".

== Economic, social, and cultural transformation ==
Economic and demographic factors in the 19th century reshaped the islands. Their consolidation opened international trade. Under Kamehameha (1795–1819), sandalwood was exported to China. That led to the introduction of money and trade throughout the islands.

Following Kamehameha's death, succession was overseen by his principal wife, Kaʻahumanu, who was designated as regent over the new king, Liholiho, who was a minor.

Queen Kaʻahumanu eliminated various prohibitions (kapu) governing women's behavior. She allowed men and women to eat together and women to eat bananas. She also overturned the old religion in favor of Christianity. The missionaries developed a written Hawaiian language. That led to high levels of literacy in Hawaiʻi, above 90 percent in the latter half of the 19th century. Writing aided in the consolidation of government. Written constitutions were developed.

In 1848, the Great Māhele was promulgated by King Kamehameha III. It instituted official property rights, formalizing the customary land tenure system in effect prior to this declaration. Ninety-eight percent of the land was assigned to the aliʻi, chiefs or nobles, with two percent to the commoners. No land could be sold, only transferred to a lineal descendant.

Contact with the outer world exposed the natives to a disastrous series of imported plagues such as smallpox. The native Hawaiian population fell from approximately 128,000 in 1778 to 71,000 in 1853, reaching a low of 24,000 in 1920. Most lived in remote villages.

American missionaries converted most of the natives to Christianity. The missionaries and their children became a powerful elite by the mid-19th century. They provided the chief advisors and cabinet members of the kings and dominated the professional and merchant class in the cities.

The elites promoted the sugar industry. Americans set up plantations after 1850. Few natives were willing to work on them, so recruiters fanned out across Asia and Europe. As a result, between 1850 and 1900, some 200,000 contract laborers from China, Japan, the Philippines, Portugal and elsewhere worked in Hawaiʻi under fixed term contracts (typically for five years). Most returned home on schedule, but many settled there. By 1908 about 180,000 Japanese workers had arrived. No more were allowed in, but 54,000 remained permanently.

== Politics and government ==
When Hawaii operated under an absolute monarchy, federalism was utilised in regional governance. Foreigners within the lands of Hawaii were thought to themselves as unprosecutable, so a unitary state along with a constitutional monarchy replaced the previous system in 1827 to have uniformity across the entire country.

== Military ==
The Hawaiian army and navy developed from the warriors of Kona under Kamehameha I. The army and navy used both traditional canoes and uniforms including helmets made of natural materials and loincloths (called the malo) as well as Western technology such as artillery cannons, muskets and ships and Western-style organization such as military uniforms and a military rank system. European advisors were treated well and became Hawaiian citizens. When Kamehameha died in 1819 he left his son Liholiho a large arsenal with tens of thousands of soldiers and many warships. This helped put down the revolt at Kuamoʻo later in 1819 and Humehume's rebellion on Kauaʻi in 1824.

The military shrank with the population under the onslaught of disease, so by the end of the Kamehameha dynasty the Hawaiian navy was severely reduced, having a few outdated ships and the army consisted of a few hundred troops. After a French invasion that sacked Honolulu in 1849, Kamehameha III sought defense treaties with the United States and Britain. During the Crimean War, Kamehameha III declared Hawaiʻi a neutral state. The United States government put strong pressure on Kamehameha IV to trade exclusively with the United States, threatening to annex the islands. To counter this threat Kamehameha IV and Kamehameha V pushed for alliances with other foreign powers, especially Great Britain. Hawaiʻi claimed uninhabited islands in the Pacific, including the Northwestern Hawaiian Islands, many of which conflicted with American claims.

The royal guards were disbanded under Lunalilo after a barracks revolt in September 1873. A small army was restored under King Kalākaua but failed to stop the 1887 Rebellion by the Missionary Party. The U.S. maintained a policy of keeping at least one cruiser in Hawaiʻi. On January 17, 1893, Liliʻuokalani, believing the U.S. military would intervene if she changed the constitution, waited for the USS Boston to leave port. Once it was known that Liliʻuokalani was revising the constitution, the Boston returned and assisted the Missionary Party in her overthrow. Following the establishment of the Provisional Government of Hawaii, the Kingdom's military was disarmed and disbanded.

== French Incident (1839) ==
Under Queen Kaʻahumanu's rule, Catholicism was illegal in Hawaiʻi, and in 1831 French Catholic priests were deported. Native Hawaiian converts to Catholicism claimed to have been imprisoned, beaten and tortured after the expulsion of the priests. Resistance toward the French Catholic missionaries continued under Kuhina Nui Kaʻahumanu II.

In 1839 Captain Laplace of the French frigate Artémise sailed to Hawaiʻi under orders to:

Destroy the malevolent impression which you find established to the detriment of the French name; to rectify the erroneous opinion which has been created as to the power of France; and to make it well understood that it would be to the advantage of the chiefs of those islands of the Ocean to conduct themselves in such a manner as not to incur the wrath of France. You will exact, if necessary with all the force that is yours to use, complete reparation for the wrongs which have been committed, and you will not quit those places until you have left in all minds a solid and lasting impression.

Under the threat of war, King Kamehameha III signed the Edict of Toleration on July 17, 1839, agreeing to Laplace's demands. He paid $20,000 in compensation for deporting the priests and the incarceration and torture of converts. The kingdom proclaimed:

That the Catholic worship be declared free, throughout all the dominions subject to the King of the Sandwich Islands; the members of this religious faith shall enjoy in them the privileges granted to Protestants.

The Roman Catholic Diocese of Honolulu returned and as reparation Kamehameha III donated land for a church.

== Invasions ==
=== Paulet Affair (1843) ===
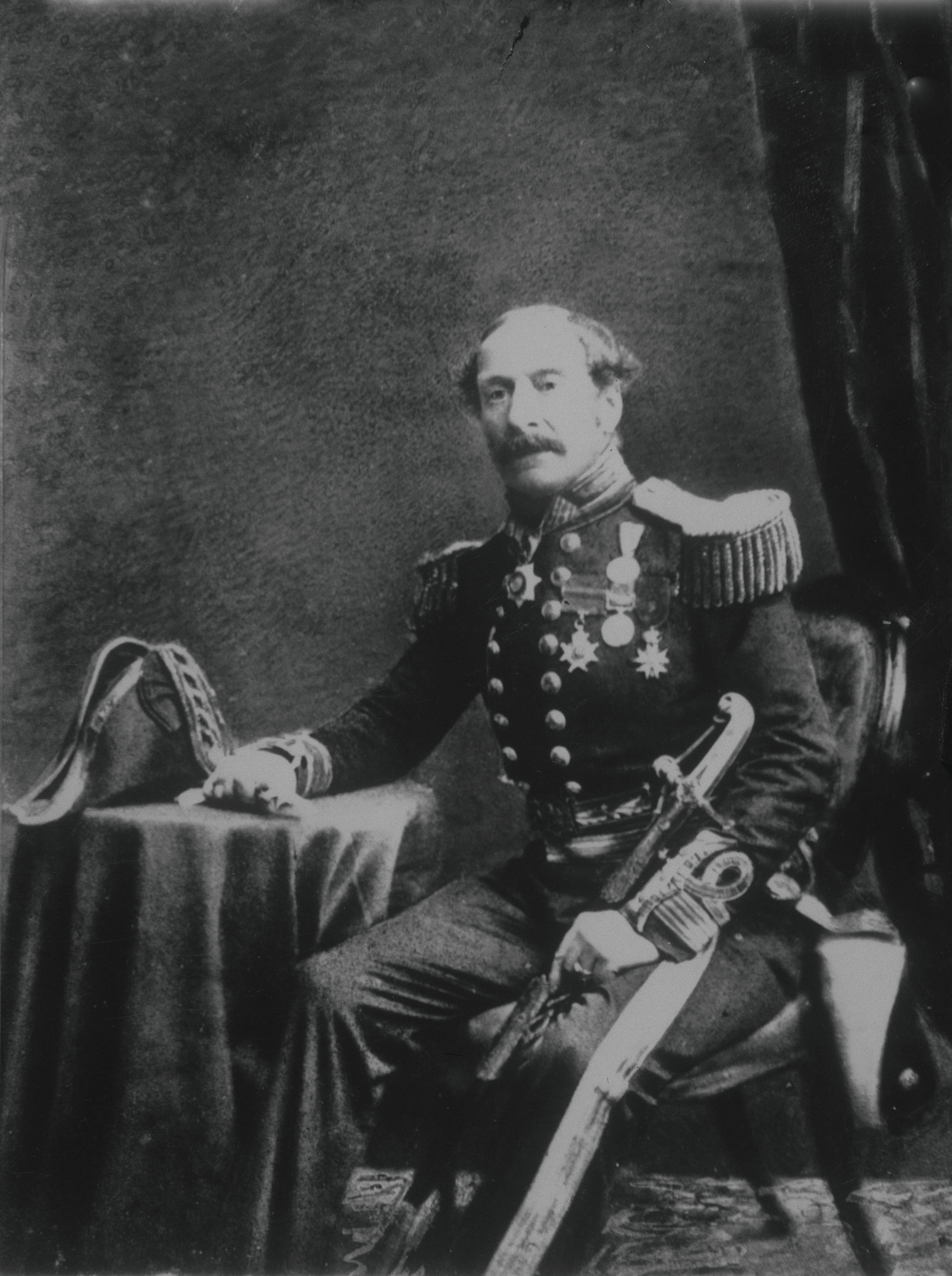
Lord George Paulet.

On February 13, 1843. Lord George Paulet of the Royal Navy warship HMS Carysfort, entered Honolulu Harbor and demanded that King Kamehameha III cede the islands to the British Crown. Under the frigate's guns, Kamehameha III surrendered to Paulet on February 25, writing:

"Where are you, chiefs, people, and commons from my ancestors, and people from foreign lands?

Hear ye! I make known to you that I am in perplexity by reason of difficulties into which I have been brought without cause, therefore I have given away the life of our land. Hear ye! but my rule over you, my people, and your privileges will continue, for I have hope that the life of the land will be restored when my conduct is justified.

Done at Honolulu, Oahu, this 25th day of February, 1843.

Kamehameha III

Kekauluohi"

Gerrit P. Judd, a missionary who had become the minister of finance for the Kingdom, secretly arranged for J.F.B. Marshall to be sent to the United States, France and Britain, to protest Paulet's actions. Marshall, a commercial agent of Ladd & Co., conveyed the Kingdom's complaint to the vice consul of Britain in Tepec. Rear Admiral Richard Darton Thomas, Paulet's commanding officer, arrived at Honolulu harbor on July 26, 1843, on HMS Dublin from Valparaíso, Chile. Admiral Thomas apologized to Kamehameha III for Paulet's actions, and restored Hawaiian sovereignty on July 31, 1843. In his restoration speech, Kamehameha III declared that "Ua Mau ke Ea o ka ʻĀina i ka Pono" (The life of the land is perpetuated in righteousness), the motto of the future State of Hawaii. The day was celebrated as Lā Hoʻihoʻi Ea (Sovereignty Restoration Day).

=== French invasion (1849) ===
In August 1849, French admiral Louis Tromelin arrived in Honolulu Harbor with the La Poursuivante and Gassendi. De Tromelin made ten demands to King Kamehameha III on August 22, mainly that full religious rights be given to Catholics, (Catholics enjoyed only partial religious rights). On August 25 the demands had not been met. After a second warning, French troops overwhelmed the skeleton force and captured Honolulu Fort, spiked the coastal guns and destroyed all other weapons they found (mainly muskets and ammunition). They raided government buildings and general property in Honolulu, causing $100,000 in damage. After the raids the invasion force withdrew to the fort. De Tromelin eventually recalled his men and left Hawaiʻi on September 5.

== Foreign relations ==
Anticipating foreign encroachment on Hawaiian territory, King Kamehameha III dispatched a delegation to the United States and Europe to secure recognition of Hawaiian independence. Timoteo Haʻalilio, William Richards and Sir George Simpson were commissioned as joint ministers plenipotentiary on April 8, 1842. Simpson went to Great Britain while Haʻalilio and Richards traveled to the United States. The Hawaiian delegation secured the assurance of Hawaiian independence by U.S. president John Tyler on December 19, 1842. They then met Simpson in Europe to secure formal recognition by the United Kingdom and France. On March 17, 1843, King Louis Philippe of France recognized Hawaiian independence at the urging of King Leopold I of Belgium. On April 1, 1843, Lord Aberdeen, on behalf of Queen Victoria, assured the Hawaiian delegation, "Her Majesty's Government was willing and had determined to recognize the independence of the Sandwich Islands under their present sovereign."

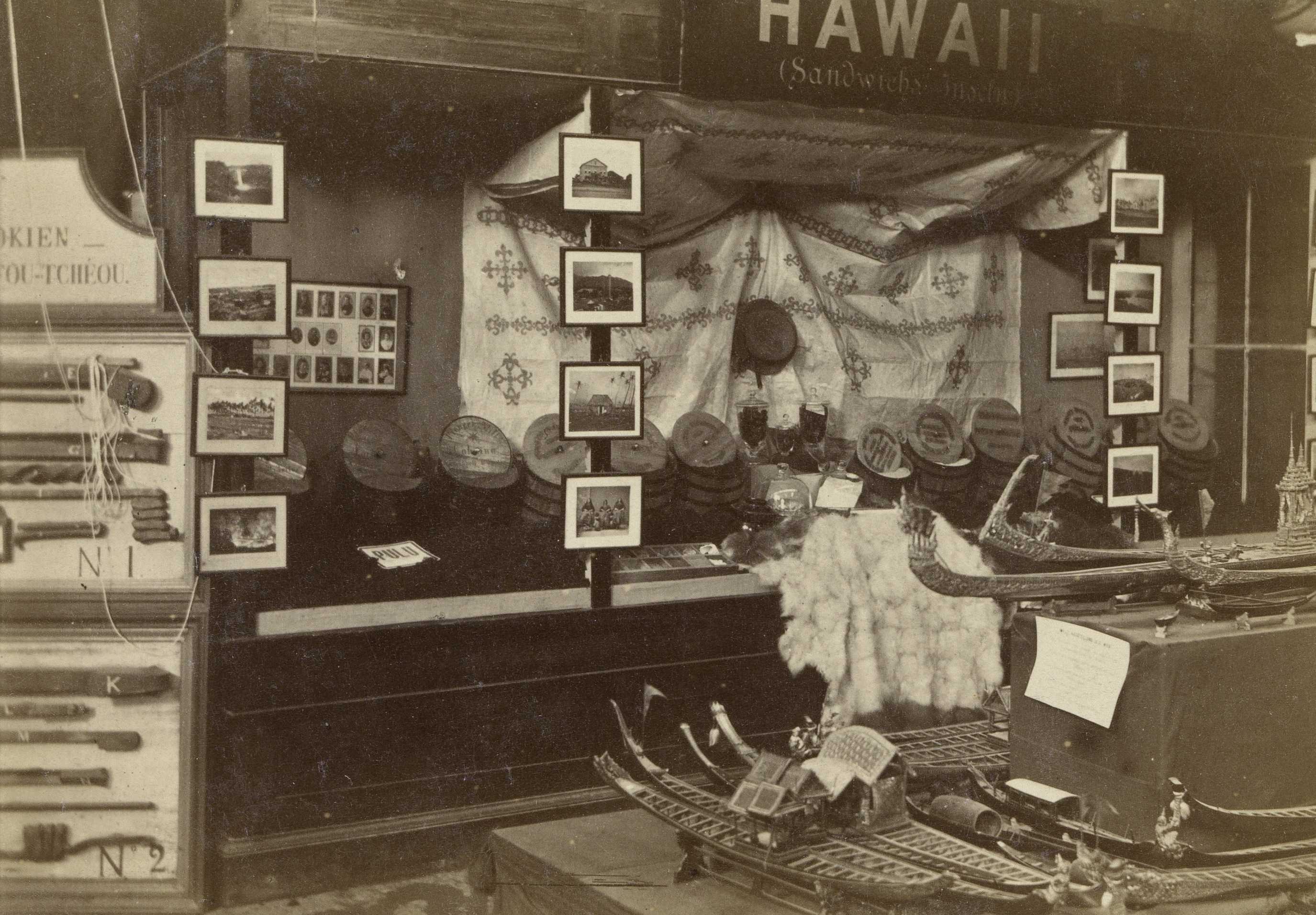
Hawaiʻi Division - Sandwich Islands (Nr. 1624); photography by György Klösz

In 1873 the Hawaiian Kingdom Even was represented at the World's Fair in Vienna.

=== Anglo-Franco Proclamation ===
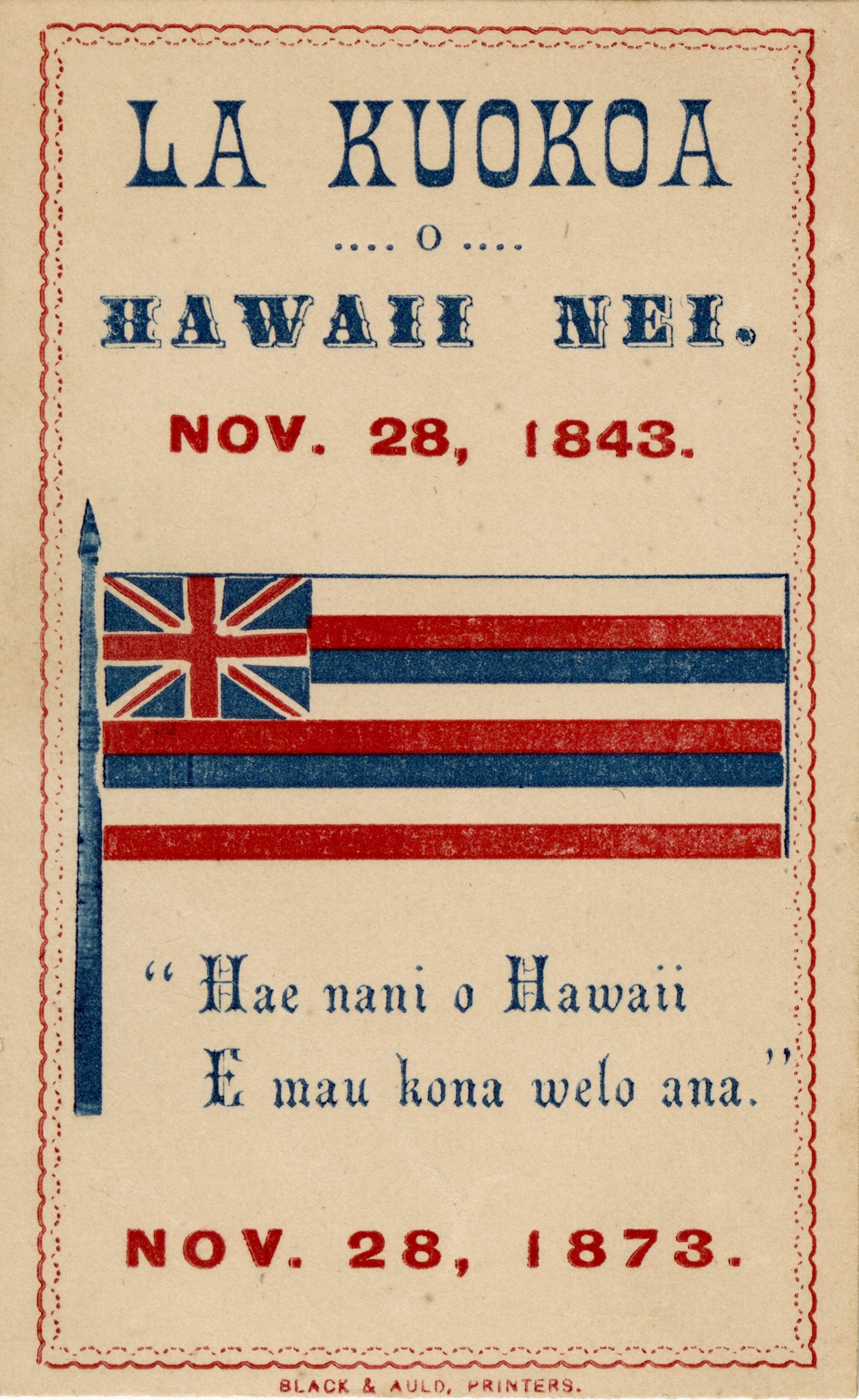
Flier for the 30th anniversary celebration of the 1843 treaty.

On November 28, 1843, at the Court of London, the British and French governments formally recognized Hawaiian independence. The "Anglo-Franco Proclamation", a joint declaration by France and Britain, signed by King Louis-Philippe and Queen Victoria, assured the Hawaiian delegation:

Her Majesty the Queen of the United Kingdom of Great Britain and Ireland, and His Majesty the King of the French, taking into consideration the existence in the Sandwich Islands (Hawaiian Islands) of a government capable of providing for the regularity of its relations with foreign nations, have thought it right to engage, reciprocally, to consider the Sandwich Islands as an Independent State, and never to take possession, neither directly or under the title of Protectorate, or under any other form, of any part of the territory of which they are composed.

The undersigned, Her Majesty's Principal Secretary of State of Foreign Affairs, and the Ambassador Extraordinary of His Majesty the King of the French, at the Court of London, being furnished with the necessary powers, hereby declare, in consequence, that their said Majesties take reciprocally that engagement.

In witness whereof the undersigned have signed the present declaration, and have affixed thereto the seal of their arms.

Done in duplicate at London, the 28th day of November, in the year of our Lord, 1843.
ABERDEEN. [L.S.]
ST. AULAIRE. [L.S.]

Hawaiʻi was the first non-European indigenous state whose independence was recognized by the major powers. The United States declined to join France and the United Kingdom in this statement, even though President John Tyler had verbally recognized Hawaiian independence. In 1849 the United States formally recognized Hawaiian independence.

November 28, Lā Kūʻokoʻa (Independence Day), became a Hawaiian national holiday to celebrate the recognition. The Hawaiian Kingdom entered into treaties with most major countries and established over 90 legations and consulates.

== Princes and chiefs who were eligible to be rulers ==
In 1839, King Kamehameha III created the Chief's Children's School (Royal School) and selected of the 16 highest-ranking aliʻi to be eligible to rule and gave them the highest education and proper etiquette. They were required to attend boarding school under the direction of Amos Starr Cooke and his wife. The eligible princes and chiefs: Moses Kekūāiwa, Alexander Liholiho, Lot Kamehameha, Victoria Kamāmalu, Emma Rooke, William Lunalilo, David Kalākaua, Lydia Kamakaʻeha, Bernice Pauahi, Elizabeth Kekaʻaniau, Jane Loeau, Abigail Maheha, Peter Young Kaeo, James Kaliokalani, John Pitt Kīnaʻu and Mary Paʻaʻāina, officially declared by King Kamehameha III in 1844.

== Territorial extent ==
The Kingdom was formed in 1795 with the Battle of Nuʻuanu, which unified all of the main Hawaiian islands except Kauaʻi and Niʻihau under Kamehameha I. The remaining two islands joined the kingdom in 1810 when king Kaumualiʻi swore allegiance to Kamehameha.

In 1822, Kaumualiʻi and his wife Queen Kaʻahumanu traveled with Captain William Sumner to find Nīhoa, as their generation had only known of it through songs and myths. While it and Necker Island had been an integral part of the kingdom at its beginning, being regularly visited by priests for religious purposes, those visits had ended with the abolishment of the kapu system in 1819. King Kamehameha IV later commissioned Captain John Paty to officially annex the island in 1857, along with Laysan and Lisianski Island.

King Kamehameha IV expanded the kingdom's territorial claims beyond the Hawaiian archipelago by commissioning Captain Samuel Allen to annex Johnston Atoll in 1858, and commissioning Captain Zenas Bent to annex Palmyra atoll in 1862. In 1886, King Kalākaua sought to consolidate control of the Northwestern Hawaiian Islands by annexing Kure Atoll, and entering negotiations with the United States to transfer Midway Atoll, which the United States had previously claimed, to the Hawaiian Kingdom.

Starting in 1850s, Hawaiʻi sought leadership among the Polynesian peoples that had not yet been annexed by European empires. Charles Saint Julian, the kingdom's commissioner to the independent Pacific islands, argued that "as the first and greatest of the Polynesian States, the Kingdom of Hawaii is, in its relationship with the...Islands of the Pacific, to be classed as a 'great power'." The Stewart Islands (Sikaiana Atoll) in the Solomon Islands were ceded to Hawaiʻi in 1856 by their residents, but the cession was never formalized.

In the 1880s, King Kalākaua, influenced by Celso Caesar Moreno, took up Saint Julian's interest in a Polynesian Confederation with Hawaiʻi at its head. In 1886, Kalākaua's minister of Foreign Affairs, Murray Gibson, sent a delegation to Samoa to meet with King Malietoa Laupepa to help negotiate a peaceful resolution to the First Samoan Civil War between Malietoa and the Tupua Tamasese dynasty. The delegation met with Malietoa in 1887 and signed a treaty establishing a Polynesian confederacy, including Hawaii and Samoa, which they hoped would eventually also include Tonga and all of the Polynesian islands. The mission was strongly criticized by the United States, Great Britain, and Germany, who were also trying to negotiate a solution to the Samoan political crisis – especially by Germany which backed Tamasese. Kalākaua recalled the delegation after Germany threatened that continuing to side with Malietoa would cause Hawaiʻi to enter a "state of war" with Germany. The confederation treaty was not ratified and Malietoa was forced into exile by the Germans later that year.

While the Hawaiian Kingdom never formally claimed the more outlying Baker Island, Howland Island, and Jarvis Island, all of which were claimed by the United States in 1856, no US citizens were present on those islands while Hawaiians regularly exploited their guano deposits, so the Hawaiian Kingdom had a viable de facto claim over them.

== Royal estates ==
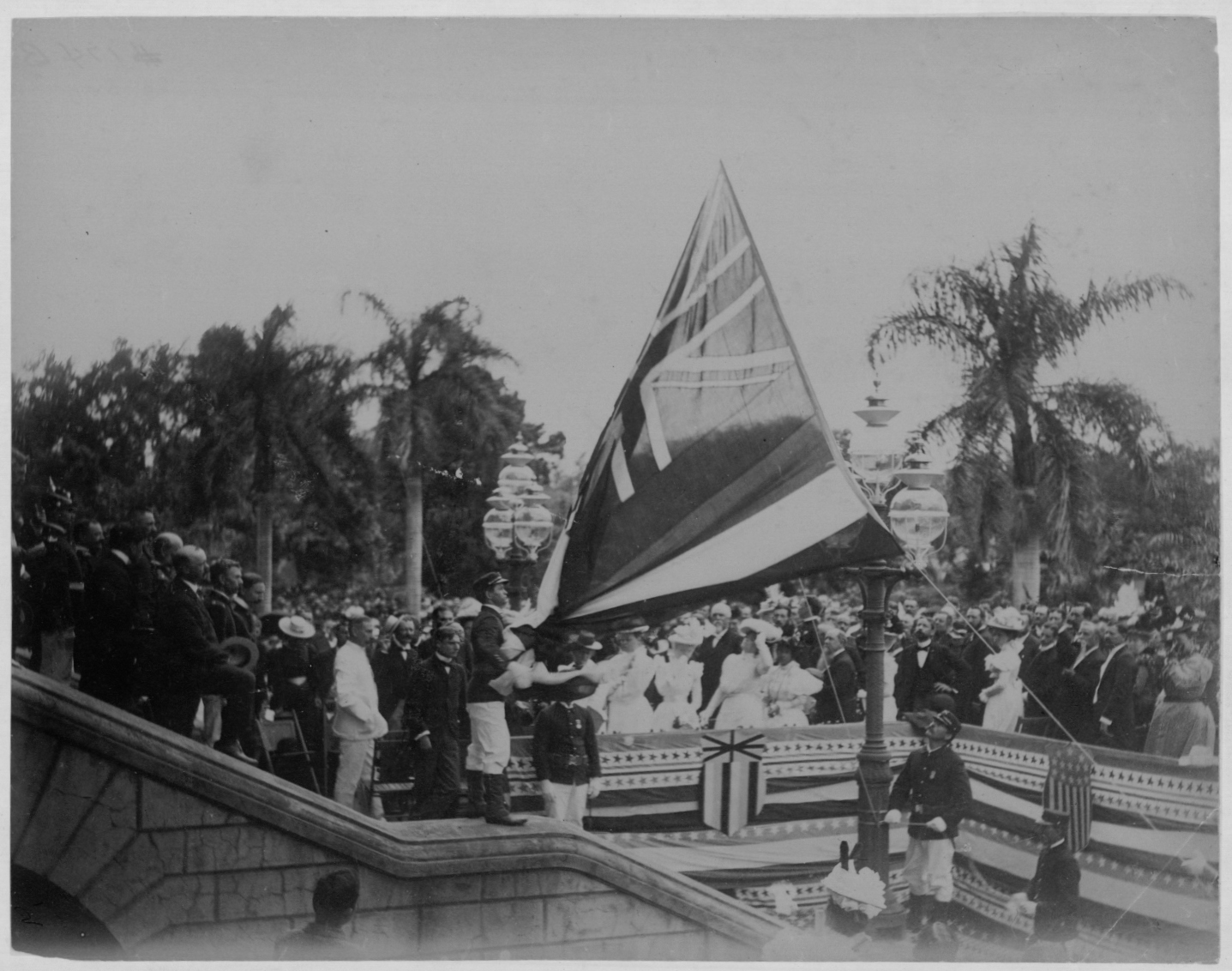
On August 12, 1898, the flag of the Hawaiian Kingdom over ʻIolani Palace was lowered to raise the United States flag to signify annexation.

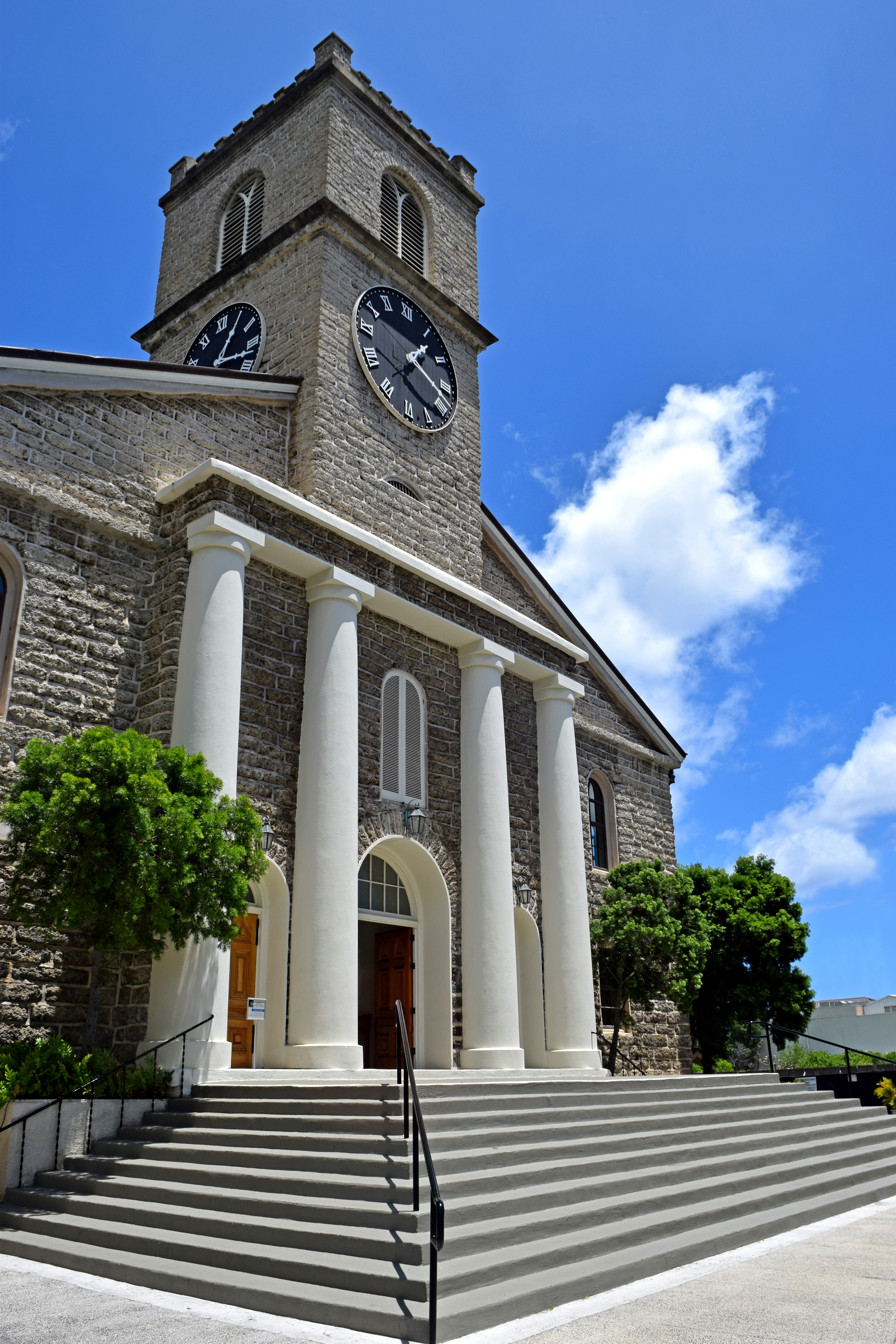
Kawaiahaʻo Church is known as the Westminster Abbey of Hawaiʻi, the site of coronations, royal christenings and funerals.

Early in its history, the Hawaiian Kingdom was governed from coastal towns on the islands of Hawaiʻi and Maui (Lāhainā). During the reign of Kamehameha III, a capital was established in Honolulu.

During the reign of Kamehameha V, the Hawaiian Kingdom commissioned the construction of Aliʻiōlani Hale to accommodate the government's growing administrative needs. Although the building was originally designed as a palace, Kamehameha V decided that the kingdom needed additional government offices and commissioned it for administrative use. He laid the cornerstone on February 19, 1872, but died before construction was completed. The building was completed and dedicated by King David Kalākaua in 1874. It initially housed the kingdom's executive offices, legislature, and judiciary. Following the overthrow of the Hawaiian monarchy in 1893, Aliʻiōlani Hale became primarily associated with the judiciary and has housed the Hawaiʻi Supreme Court since 1874.

David Kalākaua shared the dream of Kamehameha V to build a palace, and desired the trappings of European royalty. He commissioned the construction of ʻIolani Palace. In later years, the palace served as his sister's makeshift prison, the site of the official raising of the U.S. flag during annexation, and then territorial governor's and legislature's offices, ultimately becoming a museum.

=== Palaces and royal grounds ===
Many Hawaiian royal residences remain extant.

== See also ==
- Cabinet of the Hawaiian Kingdom
- Church of Hawaii
- Hawaiian sovereignty movement
- Hawaii–Tahiti relations
- Legal status of Hawaii
- List of bilateral treaties signed by the Hawaiian Kingdom
- List of missionaries to Hawaii
- Privy Council of the Hawaiian Kingdom
- Supreme Court of Hawaii
- United States federal recognition of Native Hawaiians
- Coat of Arms of the Hawaiian Kingdom
- Kamoamoa

== Bibliography ==
- Liliuokalani (1898). Hawaii's Story by Hawaii's Queen, Liliuokalani. Boston: Lee and Shepard. ISBN 978-0-548-22265-2. OCLC 2387226 – via HathiTrust.
