= William Cotton Hobdy =

American physician

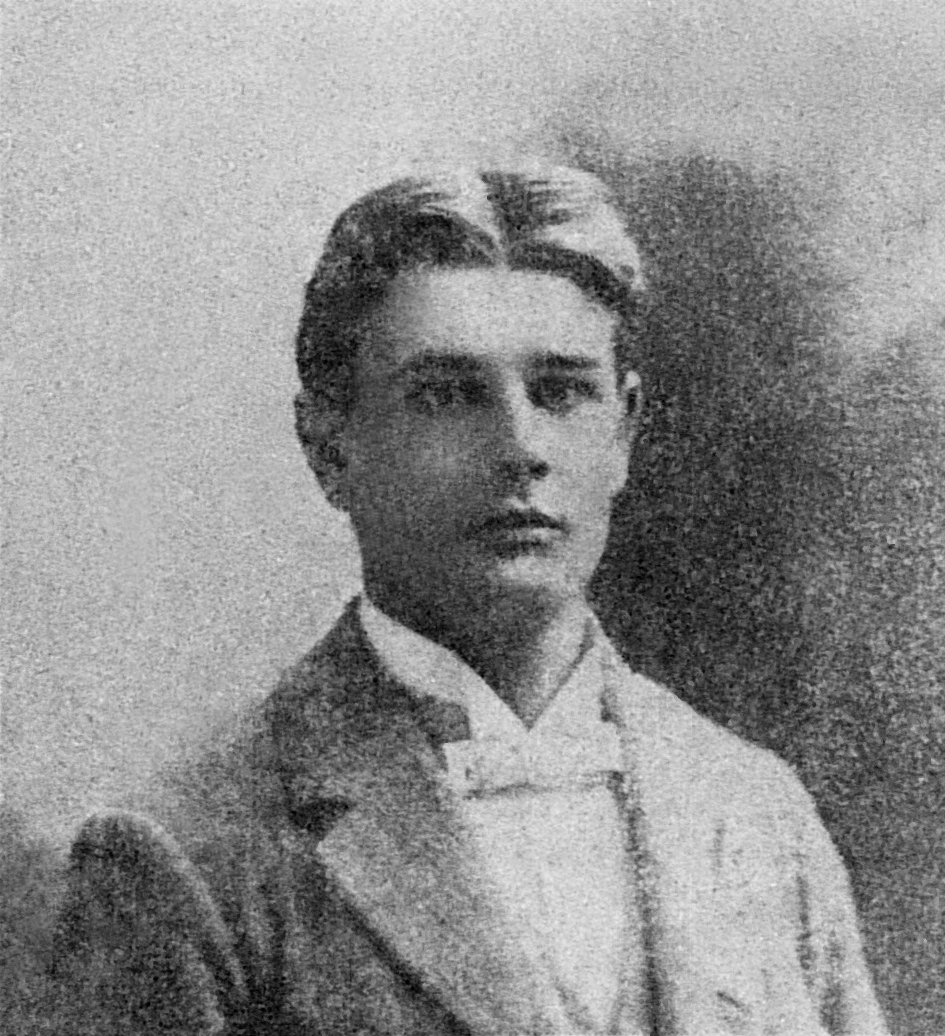
- William Cotton Hobdy, 1902
- Born: December 20, 1870; Franklin, Kentucky, U.S.
- Died: December 26, 1938 (aged 68); San Francisco, California, U.S.
- Education: Columbia University College of Physicians and Surgeons
- Occupations: Physician, quarantine officer
- Spouse: Harriet Hocker Warner
- Children: 2

William Cotton Hobdy (December 20, 1870 – December 26, 1938) was an American physician and quarantine officer. From 1914 to 1917, he served as the final physician of Queen Liliuokalani, the last monarch of the Kingdom of Hawaii.

== Life and career ==
Hobdy was born in Franklin, Kentucky on December 20, 1870, to William Rabey and Amanda Bell (Horn) Hobdy. Graduating from Kentucky State University in 1893, he received his M.D. at Columbia University College of Physicians and Surgeons in 1896. On October 18, 1897, Hobdy married Harriet Hocker Warner at LaFollette, Tennessee. The couple had a daughter, Elizabeth, who married Robert W. Hobart, and a son, William Warner.

Hobdy first interned at a hospital in Paterson, New Jersey for two years then was appointed to the Marine Hospital Service where he worked as an assistant quarantine officer in Virginia, Delaware and Philadelphia. After a stint in the United States Marine Hospital at Stapleton, Staten Island, he was selected by Surgeon General Walter Wyman and President William McKinley to study immigration abroad in Southampton, England. From there, he traveled extensively throughout Europe from December 1899 to July 1900.

On his return from Europe, Hobdy served as the quarantine officer at Savannah, Georgia, from 1900 to 1902. He was later appointed as head the United States Quarantine Station in Honolulu in the Territory of Hawaii succeeding L. E. Cofer. Arriving in the islands on August 29, 1902, Hobdy was described by the local newspaper The Pacific Commercial Advertiser:

Dr. Hobdy has an interesting personality. He has the stamp of a "way down South" man all over him. He is a native of Kentucky. Although past thirty years of age his appearance is very youthful. Regular features set off with blue eyes and wavy brown hair, with a face bare of whiskers, give him an appearance that ladies would term handsome. He is six feet two inches in height and weighs over a hundred and eighty pounds and in his younger days at college was quite an athlete.

He was, in fact, an all-around athlete who participated in shooting, rowing, football and boxing. It was the latter ability that became a newspaper story in Honolulu after Hobdy punched the captain of the American Maru for being too slow and somewhat insolent in responding to an order for a health inspection.

Hobdy served in Honolulu until being transferred to head the quarantine station of San Francisco in February 1906, where he worked to prevent bubonic plague and other diseases from leaving the waterfront port, following the 1906 San Francisco earthquake. In May 1909, he returned to Honolulu and left the service of the US Public Health Service and entered into private practice in November 1909. He remained in Hawaii for the next eleven years working for the governmental health board, Queen's Hospital, Hawaii Territorial Medical Society, and participating in many civic and social clubs.

== Physician to Liliuokalani ==
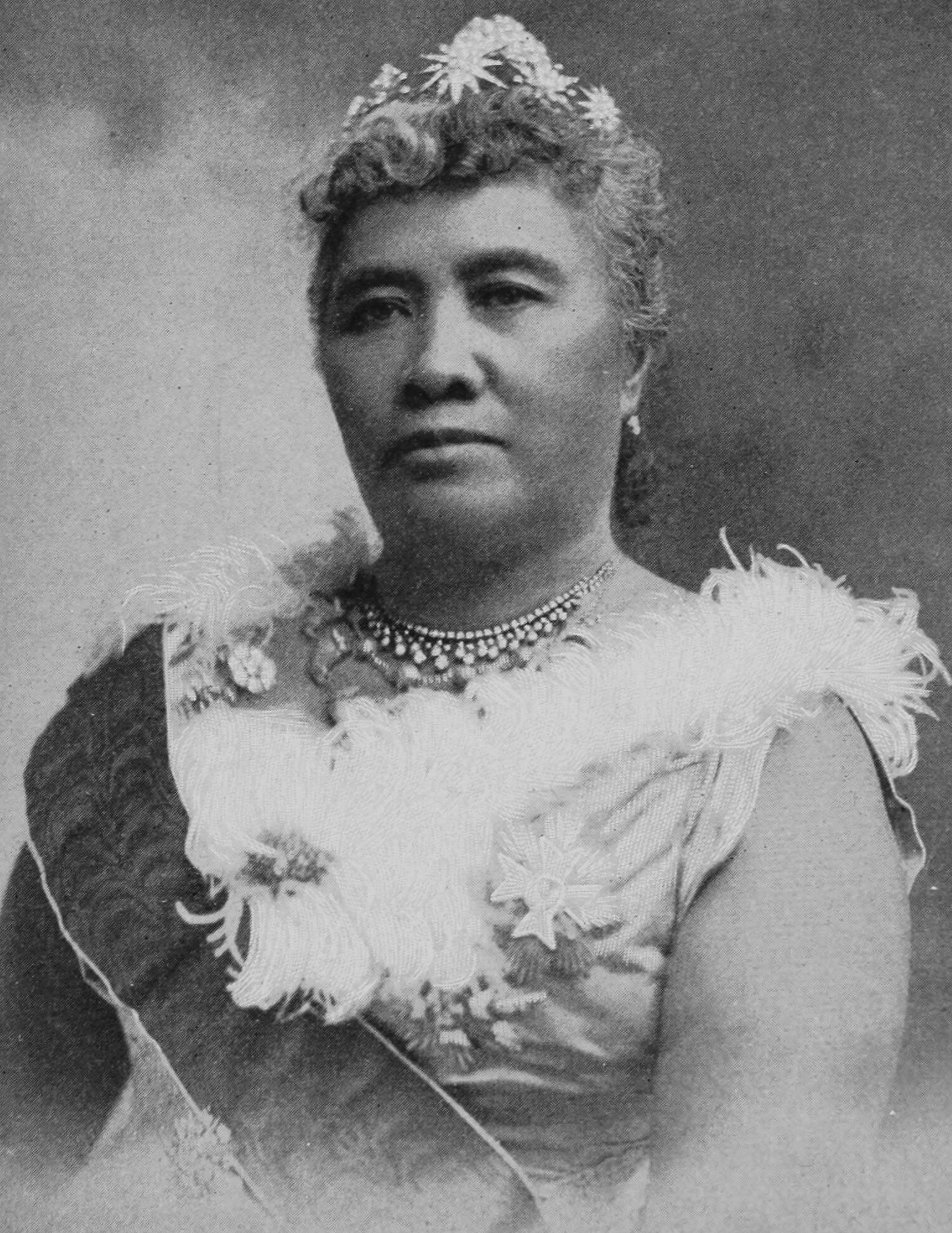
Queen Liliuokalani, the last monarch of Hawaii

During his years living in Hawaii, he worked as the private physician of Queen Liliuokalani, the last monarch of the Kingdom of Hawaii, serving from 1914 until her death on November 11, 1917. The queen was in rapidly failing health and diminished mental capacity during the weeks before her death. He was among those present at her deathbed alongside many other close friends and family. Hobdy described her final hours as being at total peace and free of pain. He took part in the state funeral procession on November 18.

== Return to San Francisco ==
Hobdy left Hawaii in July 1920, resettling in San Francisco where he continued his medical practice. While Hobdy had been living in Hawaii, furnishings and artifacts from the monarchy years of Iolani Palace were not necessarily preserved, or treated as being of historic value. At a public auction, he purchased a table once belonging to Queen Kapiolani. The table went to Hobdy's California residence when he returned to live there. It stayed in California until his son William Warner Hobdy brought it back sometime in the 1930s when he moved to the islands. The table was finally returned to Kapiolani's bedroom in the palace after the son died and the son's widow donated it.

On December 26, 1938, Hobdy died in San Francisco, at the age of 68.

== See also ==
- Death and state funeral of Liliuokalani
