= Statehood Day (Hawaii) =

State holiday in Hawaii, United States

- Official name: Statehood Day
- Also called: Admission Day (official name until 2001)
- Observed by: Hawaii
- Type: State
- Significance: Admission of Hawaii into the Union on August 21, 1959
- Date: Third Friday in August
- 2025 date: August 15
- 2026 date: August 21
- 2027 date: August 20
- 2028 date: August 18
- Frequency: annual

Statehood Day, officially called Admission Day until 2001, is a legal holiday in the U.S. state of Hawaii. Observed annually on the third Friday in August, it marks the anniversary of Hawaii's admission to the Union as the 50th state on August 21, 1959. The holiday was first observed in 1969, but public observation has become subdued in recent years as the Hawaiian sovereignty movement, which regards the overthrow of the Hawaiian Kingdom and the island's annexation by the United States as illegal, has gained influence. In 2026, bills were introduced to the Hawaii State Legislature which proposed replacing the holiday with Lā Hoʻihoʻi Ea or reducing it to a day of recognition.

== Background ==
Hawaiian statehood was first formally proposed in 1919 by Prince Jonah Kūhiō Kalanianaʻole, the Territory of Hawaii's non-voting delegate to the United States House of Representatives. Statehood did not occur until 1959, when Congress passed the Hawaii Admission Act and a public referendum resulted in a 94% approval rate for immediate admission as a state. On August 21, 1959 (the third Friday in August), President Dwight D. Eisenhower formally acknowledged Hawaii as the 50th state.

== History of the holiday ==
Ten years after Hawaii's admission to the union, the Hawaii State Legislature created the holiday "Admission Day," scheduling it for the third Friday in August of each year. The holiday went into effect immediately and was first observed that same year. For the holiday's 25th anniversary in 1984, the legislature passed a one-time exception moving the date to August 21, 1984, as to coincide with the exact date of Hawaii being granted statehood. The celebrations that year were retroactively described by the The Honolulu Advertiser as being an occasion of "patriotic pageantry and celebration." In 2001, the holiday was renamed "Statehood Day" by a bill introduced by Brian Taniguchi. Despite the formal name change, the general public continued to refer to the holiday as "Admission Day" for years after.

== Observance ==
Statehood Day is recognized as a holiday for both state and county governments, meaning that most public employees receive the day off. Some areas of Hawaii offer free street parking in observance of the holiday.

Public celebrations of the holiday have waned over the years. While the initial news of statehood sparked widespread celebration, over the following decades, public festivities mostly died out as a result of discontent from Native Hawaiians. In 2002 and 2003 the Hawaii Senate requested large public celebrations and parades, citing the need for patriotism after the September 11 attacks. In 2015, the office of state senator Sam Slom (at the time the only Republican serving in the Senate) described the anniversary of statehood as being "often met with apathy, disinterest, and even controversy." By 2019, the holiday typically passed without any legislative resolutions, proclamations, or official events.

== Controversy ==
Many Native Hawaiian activists object to commemorating statehood because they view the overthrow of the Hawaiian Kingdom, and the eventual statehood process, as illegal acts that denied Hawaiians the right to self-determination. John D. Waiheʻe III, the state's first governor of Native Hawaiian ancestry, said that statehood was initially only supported by Native Hawaiians as an improvement on territorial status.

=== Protests of celebrations ===
In 2006, state senator Sam Slom organized a Statehood Day celebration on the grounds of ʻIolani Palace, where statehood was first declared in 1959. The celebration was disrupted by a group of about 50 activists, who shouted over a performance of "The Star-Spangled Banner" and heckled the Kalani High School band into leaving the event. Kekuni Blaisdell was one of the participants in the protest. In 2008, a group calling itself the Kingdom of Hawaii, Nation, broke into ʻIolani Palace and raised their own flag.

In 2009, Governor Linda Lingle established a commission to plan 50th-anniversary celebrations. Part of the commission's findings were that events should be planned as "commemorations" rather than "celebrations" in order to represent all sides of the dispute. Lawmakers ultimately allocated $600,000 for anniversary events, including a daylong conference at the Hawaii Convention Center. Despite the commission's efforts, several hundred protestors marched to the convention center with an effigy of Uncle Sam in a cardboard tank.

=== Alternative holidays ===
Several alternative holidays to Statehood Day have been proposed over the years. Some activists prefer to celebrate Lā Hoʻihoʻi Ea on July 31, the anniversary of the Hawaiian Kingdom's restoration of sovereignty. In 2026, representative Jeanné Kapela introduced a bill to the Hawaii House that would officially replace statehood day with Lā Hoʻihoʻi Ea. A similar bill, which would have created an Immigrants Day holiday and removed Statehood Day's holiday status, was introduced in the Hawaii Senate by Stanley Chang, Chris Lee, Troy Hashimoto, Karl Rhoads, and Glenn Wakai. Neither bill was ultimately voted on.

== See also ==
- List of U.S. states by date of admission to the Union
- Sovereignty Restoration Day
- Independence Day (Hawaii)
- Hawaiian sovereignty movement
