= Death and state funeral of Liliʻuokalani =

Death of last Hawaiian monarch

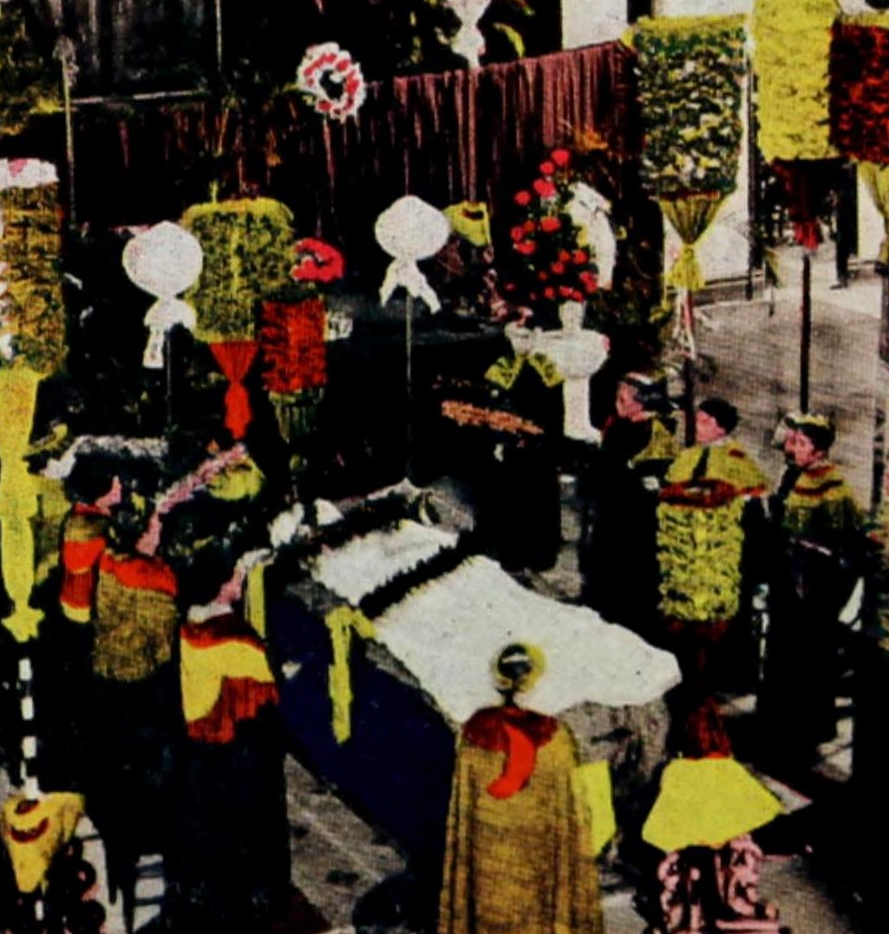
Liliuokalani lying in state at Kawaiahaʻo Church, no casket, covered only with an ivory-colored shroud

Liliʻuokalani, the last monarch of Hawaii, died November 11, 1917. The royal standard (flag) was raised over her home at Washington Place to signal to the public that she was deceased. Under military guard, her body was moved at midnight for embalming. After the traditional Hawaiian mourning of chanting and wailing, the public was allowed to view her body covered only by a shroud. Her state funeral was held in the throne room of Iolani Palace, on November 18, 1917, followed by her funeral procession to the Royal Mausoleum of Mauna ʻAla. An estimated 1,500 adults and children were in the funeral procession.

== Death ==
She died at her residence Washington Place, at 8:30 a.m. on November 11, 1917, at the age of seventy-nine. According to her lady-in-waiting Lahilahi Webb, the Queen had been in rapidly failing health and diminished mental capacity during the weeks immediately preceding her death. Besides Webb, those who were with her at the end were her doctor William Cotton Hobdy, Prince Jonah Kūhiō Kalanianaʻole, and his wife Elizabeth Kahanu Kalanianaʻole. Her private secretary and trustee of her deed of trust, Curtis P. Iaukea, immediately raised her royal standard (flag) over Washington Place to signal her death. Iaukea's wife Charlotte Kahaloipua Hanks, and two elderly royal retainers Wakeke Ululani Heleluhe and Onaʻala, were also in attendance at the Queen's death.

Immediately following a doctor's statement that life was gone, Rev. Leopold Kroll of the Hawaiian congregation of St. Andrew's Cathedral and Rev. Henry H. Parker, pastor of Kawaihao church were notified, and the bells began their sad tolling - 79 times they tolled, telling all Honolulu that Queen Lilliuolakani, 79 years old, was dead.

— Honolulu Star-Bulletin,

== State funeral ==
Iaukea was in charge of making the funeral arrangements, but territorial governor Lucius E. Pinkham accorded her the honor of a state funeral and took charge of it. According to Hawaiian tradition, it was believed that the birth and death of an aliʻi would be heralded by a natural phenomena. Schools of the red āweoweo fish, traditionally associated with the death of a member of the Hawaiian royal family, were seen off the coast of Oahu months before Liliuokalani's death.

Following the raising of the royal standard, Hawaiian royalty and non-royalty arrived to pay their respects. The Hawaiian National Guard under Brigadier General Samuel Johnson was stationed at the gates. In accordance with Native Hawaiian tradition that dictated the body of a deceased royal could only be moved after dark, Liliuokalani's body was transferred under military guard at midnight on Monday along torch-lit streets to Kawaiahaʻo Church for embalming. On Tuesday, her body lay in state for 12 hours without a casket, covered only by a silk shroud, for the traditional Hawaiian mourning of chanting and wailing. Afterwards, the body was placed inside the casket for viewing until 6 p.m. on Saturday. She received a state funeral in the throne room of Iolani Palace, on November 18, 1917.

As her catafalque was moved from the palace up Nuuanu Avenue with 1,200-foot (370 m) ropes pulled by 204 stevedores, for entombment with her family members in the Kalākaua Crypt of the Royal Mausoleum of Mauna ʻAla, composer Charles E. King led a youth choir in "Aloha ʻOe". The song was picked up by the procession participants and the crowds of people along the route. Films were taken of the funeral procession and later stored at ʻĀinahau, the former residence of her sister and niece. A fire on August 1, 1921, destroyed the home and all its contents, including the footage of the Queen's funeral.

For a week, the casket was placed on a bier in the underground Kalākaua Crypt where Webb, Wakeke and her daughter Myra Heleluhe stood vigil over the remains. On November 26, following a ceremony officiated by many of the participants of the earlier funeral, the casket was sealed in a niche adjoining the one containing her husband John Owen Dominis.

W. F. Aldrich created a film of the state funeral.

Since the state funeral took place during the recess of the territorial legislature, Kūhiō, Iaukea, William Owen Smith and five other businessmen and politicians borrowed money from the Bank of Hawaii to cover the expenditures. The state funeral cost the territorial government a total of US$8,500 (equivalent to about $213,600 in 2025).

== Procession order ==
Although exact counts vary in the news coverage, it was estimated that thousands adults and children marched in the funeral procession. The order of procession also varied slightly in different sources.

- Mounted and Foot Police
- Grand Marshal and Aides
- Capt. Henri Berger and the Royal Hawaiian Band
- Kamehameha School Cadets (120 cadets)

30 young boys and the school's officers

- Queen's Own Troop Boy Scouts
- St. Louis College Band
- Hawaiian Societies (more than 1500 people in this group)

Ahahui Kaahumanu – (30 members) in black holoku and yellow feathered leis; included Lahihi Webb, Lydia Aholo
Ahahui Poola
Ancient Order of Foresters
Court Lunalilo (200-plus)
Daughters of Warriors
Hawaiian Chapter No. 1, Order of Kamehameha – (35 members) – catafalque immediately followed this group
Hui Kokua Hookuonoono o na Wahini Oiwi Hawaii white and yellow leis (nearly 100 combined with men's)
Hui Kokua Hookuonoono o na Kanaka Oiwi Hawaii white uniforms and caps (about 50 men)
Hui Kokua Ame (50 members) red shirts
Hui Mamona
Kahale o na Alii "House of the Kings" (12 women)
Kalama Lodge (35 members)
Kamehameha Alumni Association (25 girls)
Koahelelani, 7 women, royal purple and yellow leis
Laie delegation L. D. S. Hui Manawela o na Wahini (about 100)
Children's branch of the L. D. S.
St. Andrew's Priory School Girls (78 young women)
St. Louis Alumni

- Second U. S. Infantry Band
- 1st Squadron of the Fourth U. S. Cavalry of Schofield Barracks (250 troopers)
- Battalion, First U. S. Field Artillery (90 men to each battery)

Battery D did the 21-gun salute, each gun fired 1 minute apart
Batteries E and F marched in the procession

- Second U. S. Infantry
- Detachment U. S. Marines
- Detachment U. S. Navy
- Coast Artillery Band
- Detachment H. I. J. M. Tokiwa's (138 sailors)
- Provisional Battalion National Guard (412 men)

Companies A, B, C and D, 103 men in each company

- Physician of the late Queen, William Cotton Hobdy
- Retainers of the late Queen
- Choir boys of St. Andrews Cathedral
- Clergy
- Honorary Pallbearers

Governor Pinkham, US Senator Miles Poindexter of Washington, US Representative James C. McLaughlin of Michigan, Charles F. Chillingworth, president of the territorial senate, Henry Lincoln Holstein, speaker of the house. Chief Justice A. G. M. Robertson. William Owen Smith. Curtis P. Iaukea, E. Faxon Bishop, Brigadier General John P. Wisser, US Army, Captain George R. Clark, US Navy, Brigadier General Samuel I. Johnson, NGH.

- Poolas drawing the Catafalque (204 stevedores)
- Bearers of the Hawaiian Decorations
- Bearer of the Imperial Japanese Decorations
- Catafalque, Kāhili and Pallbearers

Frederick William Beckley Jesse P. Makainai, David Hoapil, Albert K. Hoapili, David Maikai, William Simerson, G. K. Kealohapauole, Frederick Hank Iaukea, James Harbottle Boyd, Henry Franz Bertelmann, A. U. Alohikea, Thomas Pualiʻi Cummins, Edwin Kea, A. K. Nahaolelua, Henry Pitman Beckley

- Prince Kalanianaʻole and Princess Kalanianaʻole
- Carriage of Princess Kawananakoa, representing Prince Kalakaua, Princess Kapiolani and Liliuokalani
- Governor and Aides
- Commanding Officer, Hawaiian Department and Aides
- Commandant Pearl Harbor Naval Station and Aides
- Adjutant General Territory of Hawaii and Aides
- The Congressional Party
- Secretary of the Territory of Hawaii
- Governor's Staff
- Staff of Department Commander
- Staff of Commandant Naval Station
- Chief Justice
- President of the Hawaiian Senate
- Speaker of the House of Representatives
- Justices of the Supreme Court
- Heads of Territorial Departments
- Officers U. S. Army and Navy
- Federal Officers
- Members of the Hawaiian Senate
- Members of the House of Representatives
- Members Consular Corps.
- Circuit Judges
- County Officials
- Board of Supervisors
- Various Societies, not Hawaiian
- Punahou Cadets
- Cadets Honolulu Military Academy
- Schools

== Gallery ==
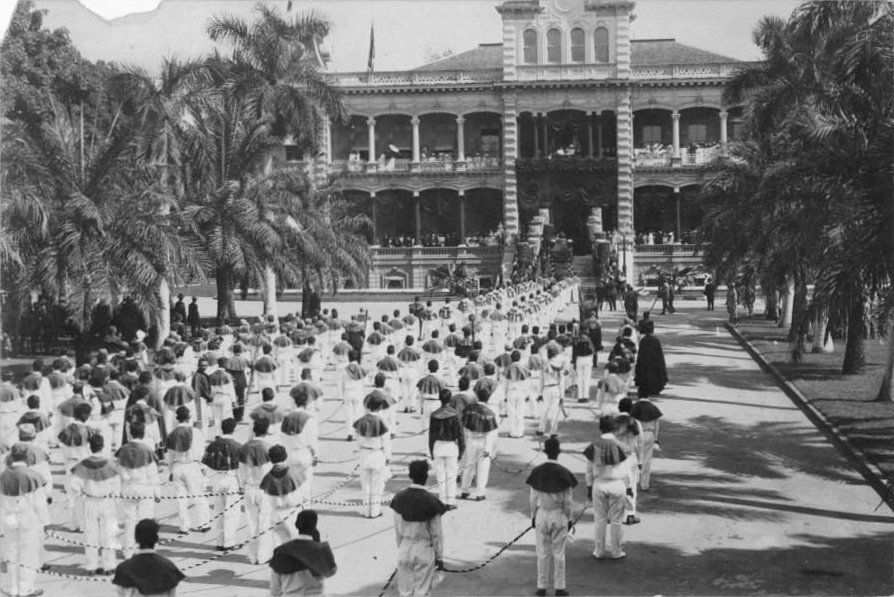

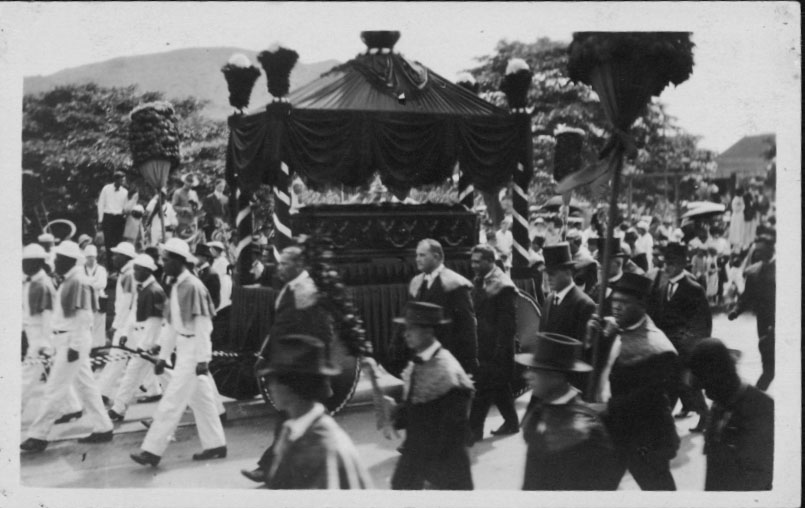

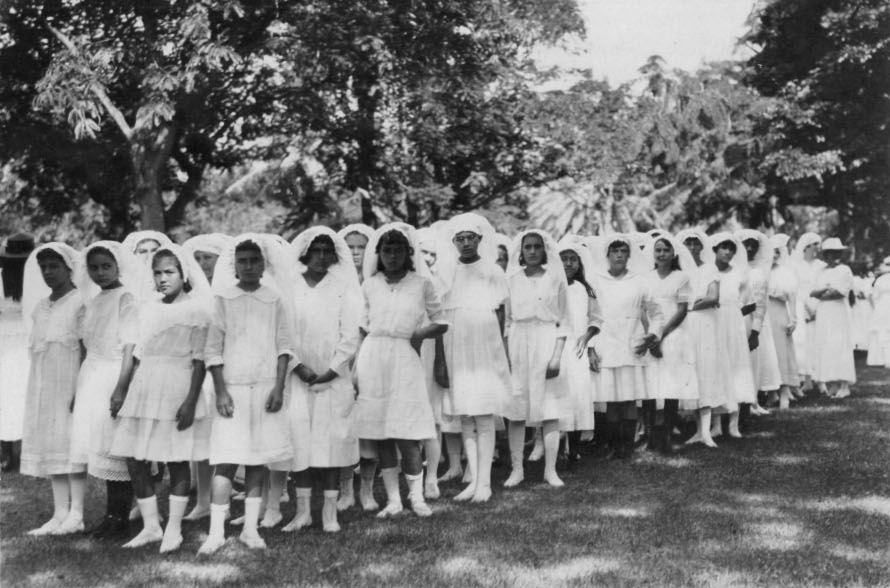

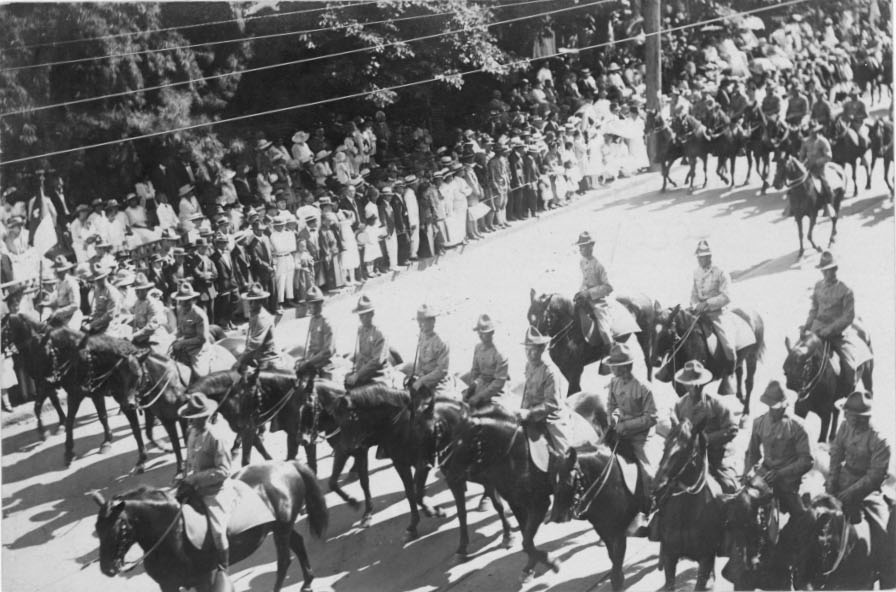
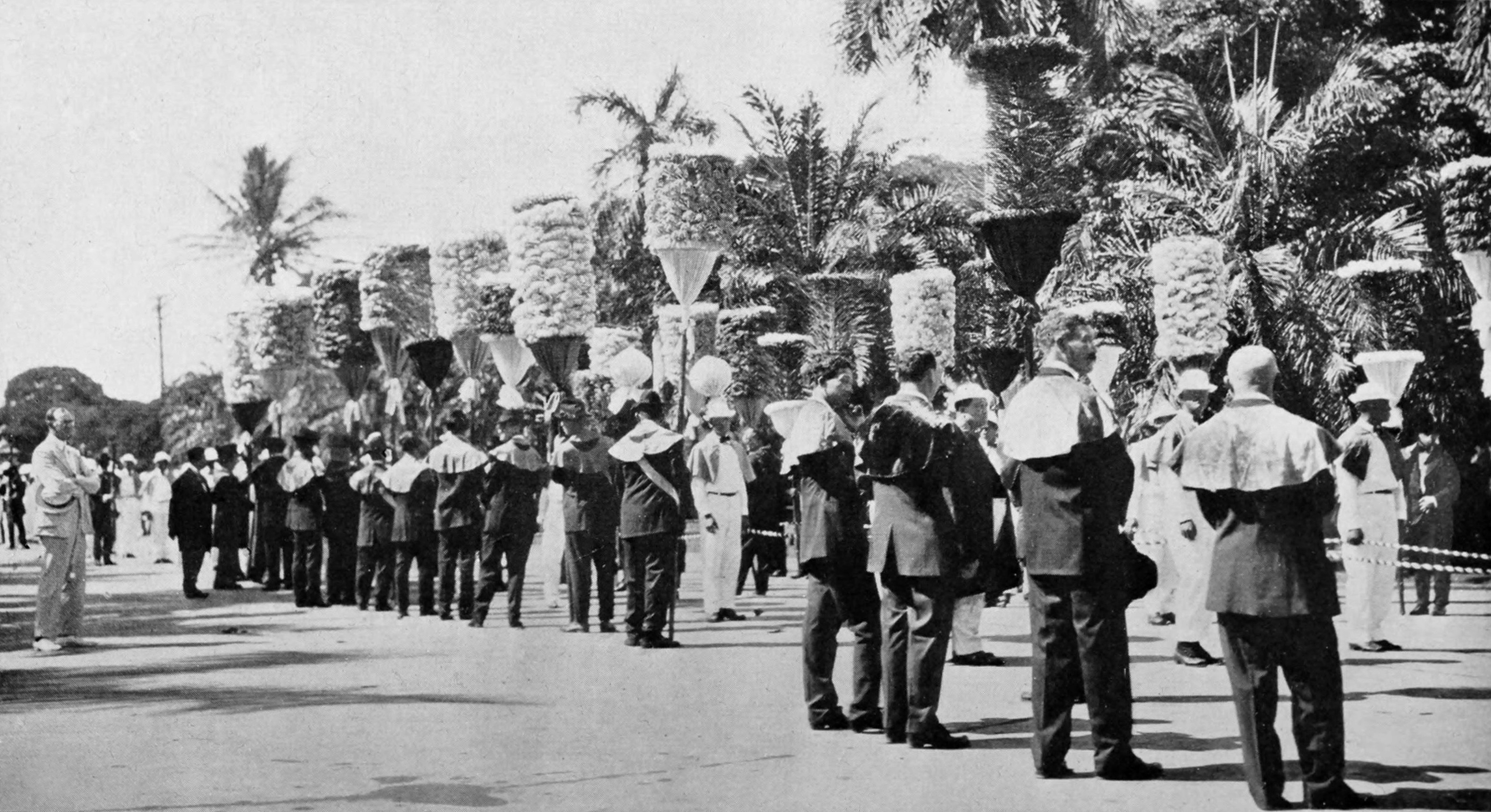

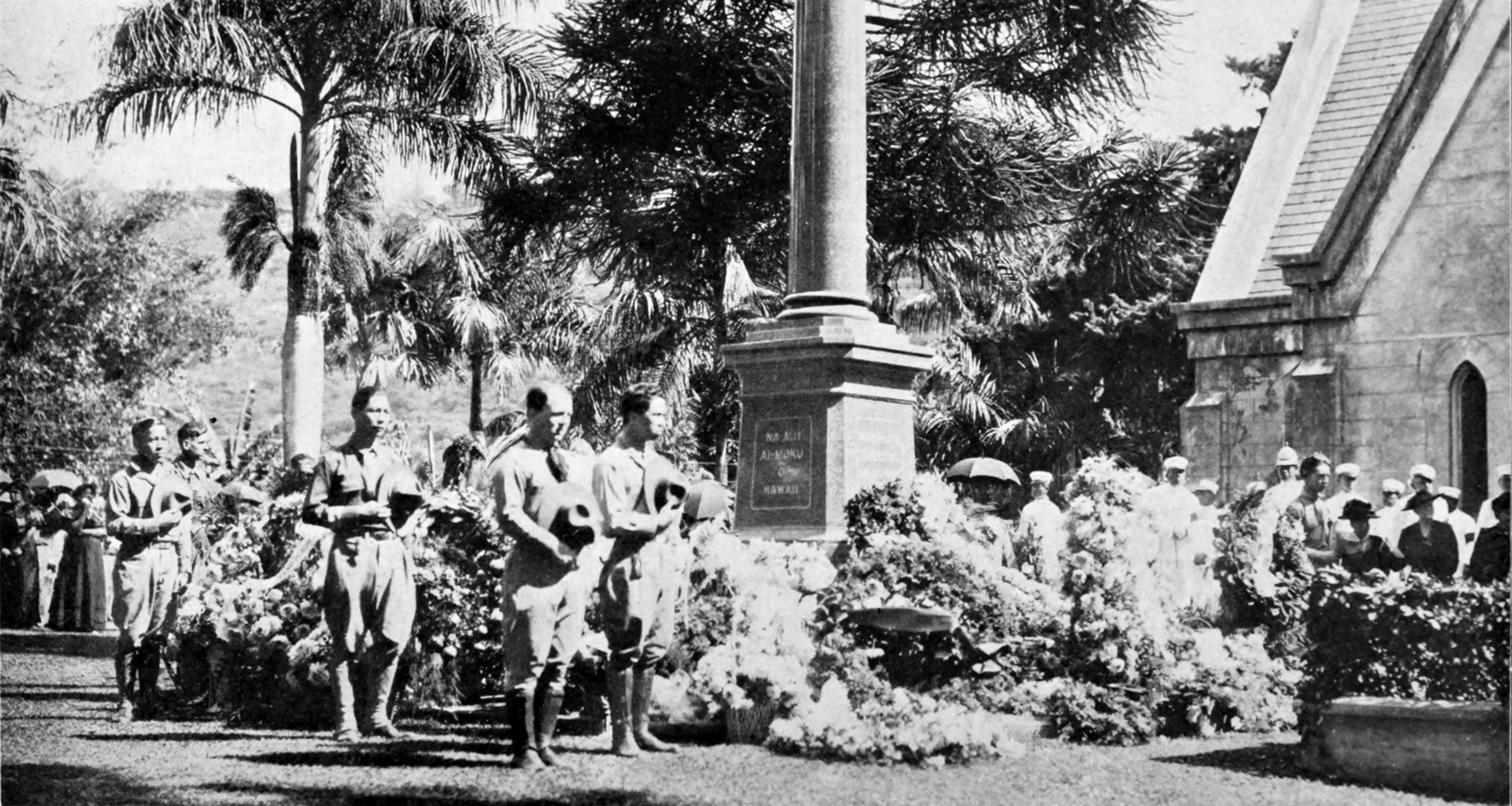

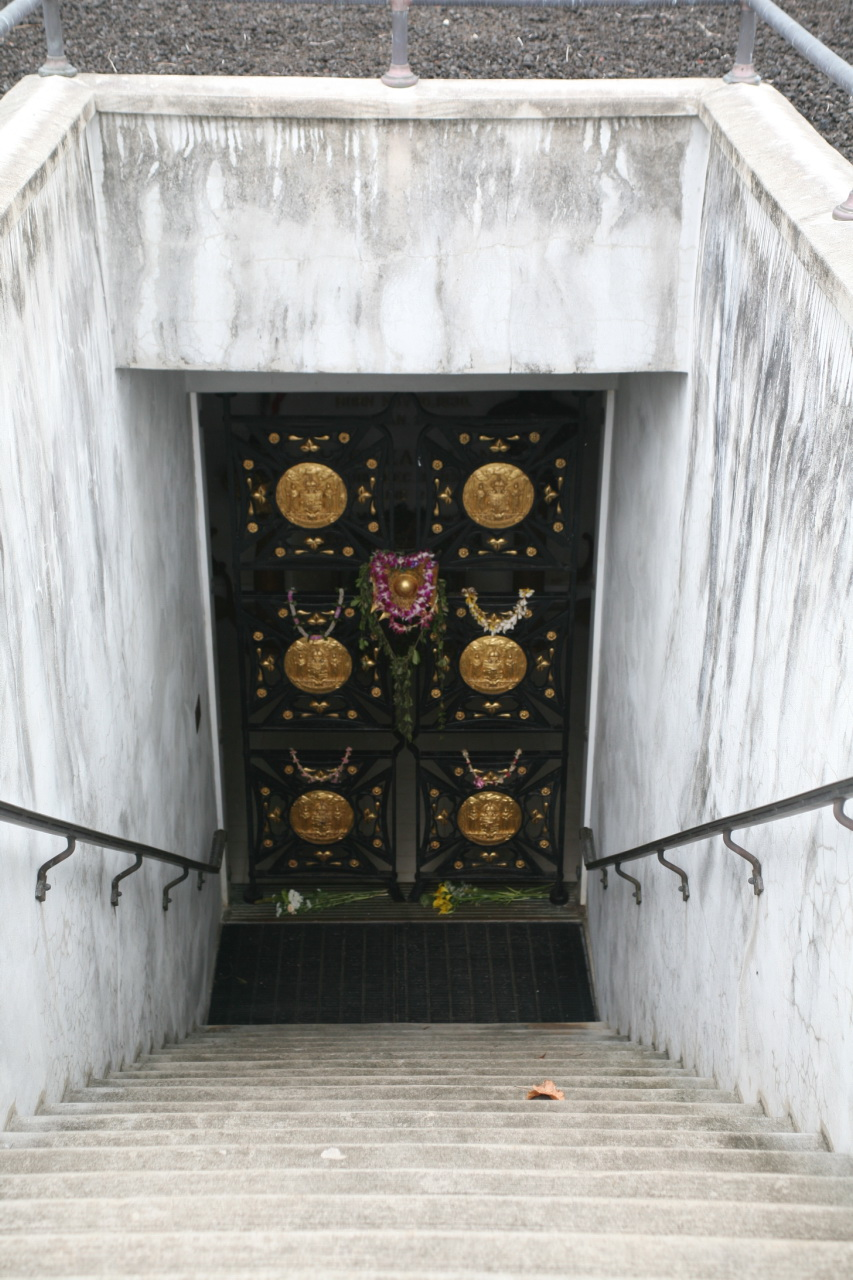

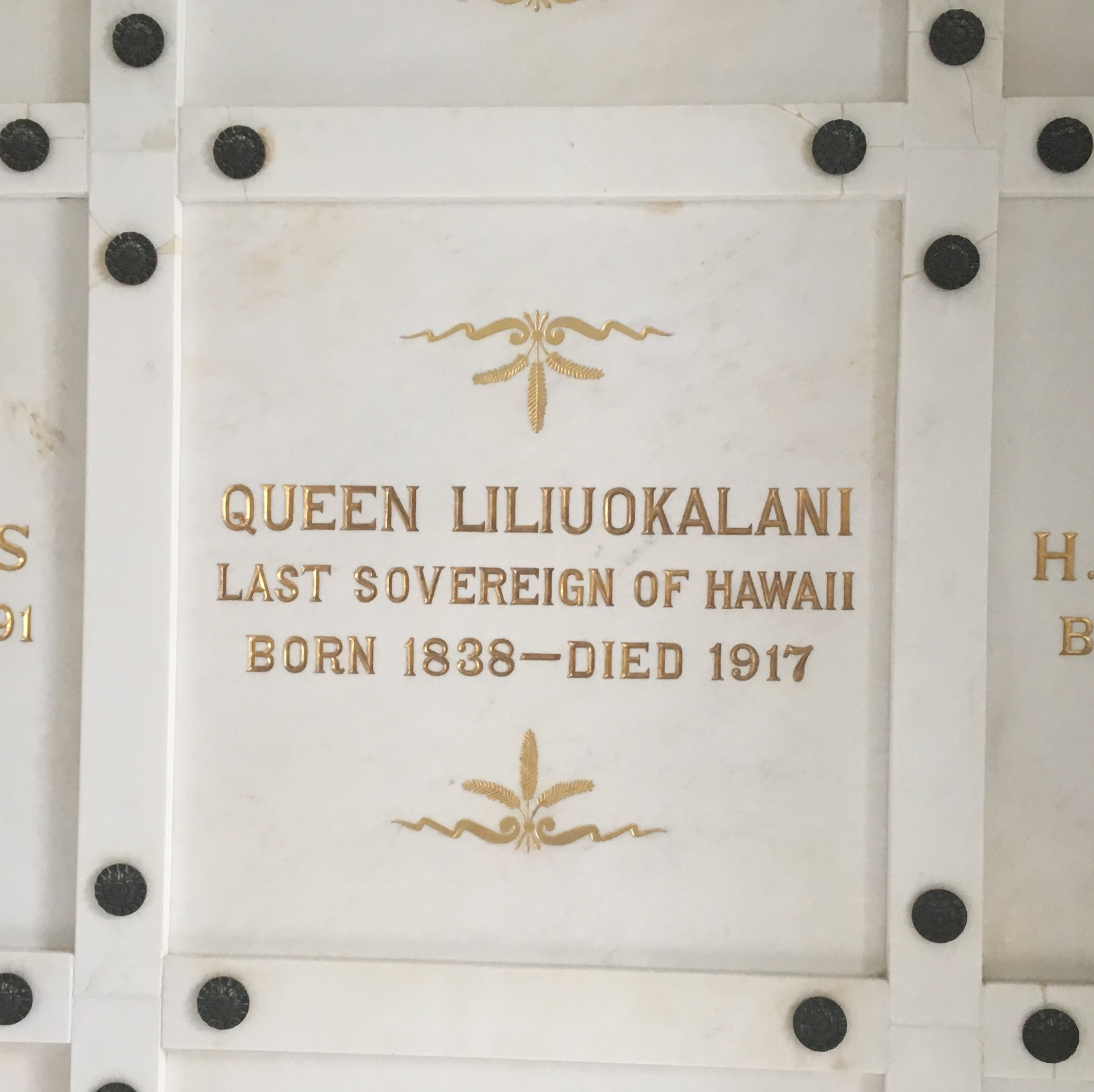

== See also ==
- Death and state funerals of Kalākaua
