= 2008 occupation of Iolani Palace =

2008 protest in Hawaii

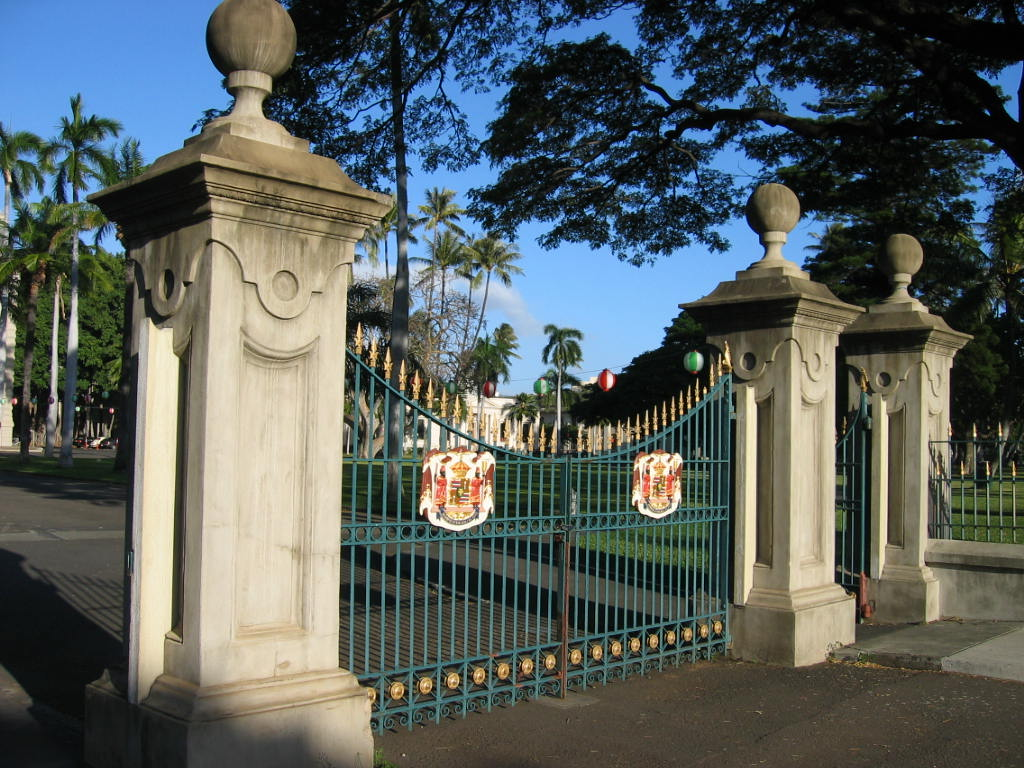
Main gate of Iolani Palace

In 2008, two attempts were made by separate groups involved in the Hawaiian sovereignty movement to occupy ʻIolani Palace, the home of the last two monarchs of the Hawaiian Kingdom in downtown Honolulu in the U.S. state of Hawaii.

== April 30 occupation of ʻIolani Palace grounds ==
At around 9:00 a.m. on the morning of April 30, 2008, roughly seventy members of a group that described itself as the Hawaiian Kingdom Government blocked entrance to the grounds of ʻIolani Palace in a move to assert the group's purported status as the Hawaiian Kingdom's government. According to the group's leader, Mahealani Kahau, the group put up yellow "No Trespassing" signs at the entrances to the palace grounds to "give awareness and notice to everyone that passes that the Hawaiian Kingdom Government has resumed its lawful status as the seat of government." Following negotiations between the group and the Hawaii Department of Land and Natural Resources, the state agency with jurisdiction over the palace, the gates were reopened at around 2:00 p.m. No one was arrested.

The group returned to the palace grounds the following day, but did not block the palace entrances and instead peacefully occupied a portion of the palace's lawn.

== Statehood Day occupation ==
On August 15, 2008, independence proponents occupied ʻIolani Palace for four hours. The trespassing incident happened on Statehood Day 2008. On August 15, 2008, at 4:30 in the afternoon, 27 members of the so-called Kingdom of Hawaii Nation, a national-independence fringe faction, entered the grounds of ʻIolani Palace. The group was led by James Akahi, who claims descent from Kamehameha I and called himself "Majesty Akahi Nui, King of Hawaii". Fifteen to twenty members of the group wore red shirts with "SECURITY" printed in yellow on the backs while other members wore black. The purported mission of the group was to establish the palace as a new seat of government, undermine the State government, and declare the independence of Hawaii from the United States.

Six to ten employees of the Friends of ʻIolani Palace, the nonprofit that administers the palace on behalf of the state, and the nonprofit's director, Kippen de Alba Chu, locked down the buildings and locked themselves inside the administrative building, located next to the palace. Facilities manager Noelani Ah Yuen attempted to stop the intruders from locking the east gate and was injured by the trespassers; she also withdrew into the administrative building. The group flew their flag and entered ʻIolani Barracks and Palace.

During the trespassing incident, a city police officer refused to stop the trespassers because the palace grounds are state property and hence under the jurisdiction of the state police, the HDPS. Police chief Boisse Correa rejected claims his officers committed wrongdoing.

Seven members of the group were arraigned on burglary charges. Charges against six were dismissed, and James Akahi was acquitted of felony burglary charges, but convicted of simple trespass and fined. Two group members were tried for assaulting an employee of the palace and acquitted.

== See also ==
- Aboriginal land claim
- Hawaiian sovereignty movement
- Legal status of Hawaii
- Overthrow of the Hawaiian Kingdom
- Wilcox rebellions
