= ʻIolani Palace =

Royal palace in Honolulu, Hawaii

- U.S. National Register of Historic Places
- U.S. National Historic Landmark
- U.S. Historic district – Contributing property
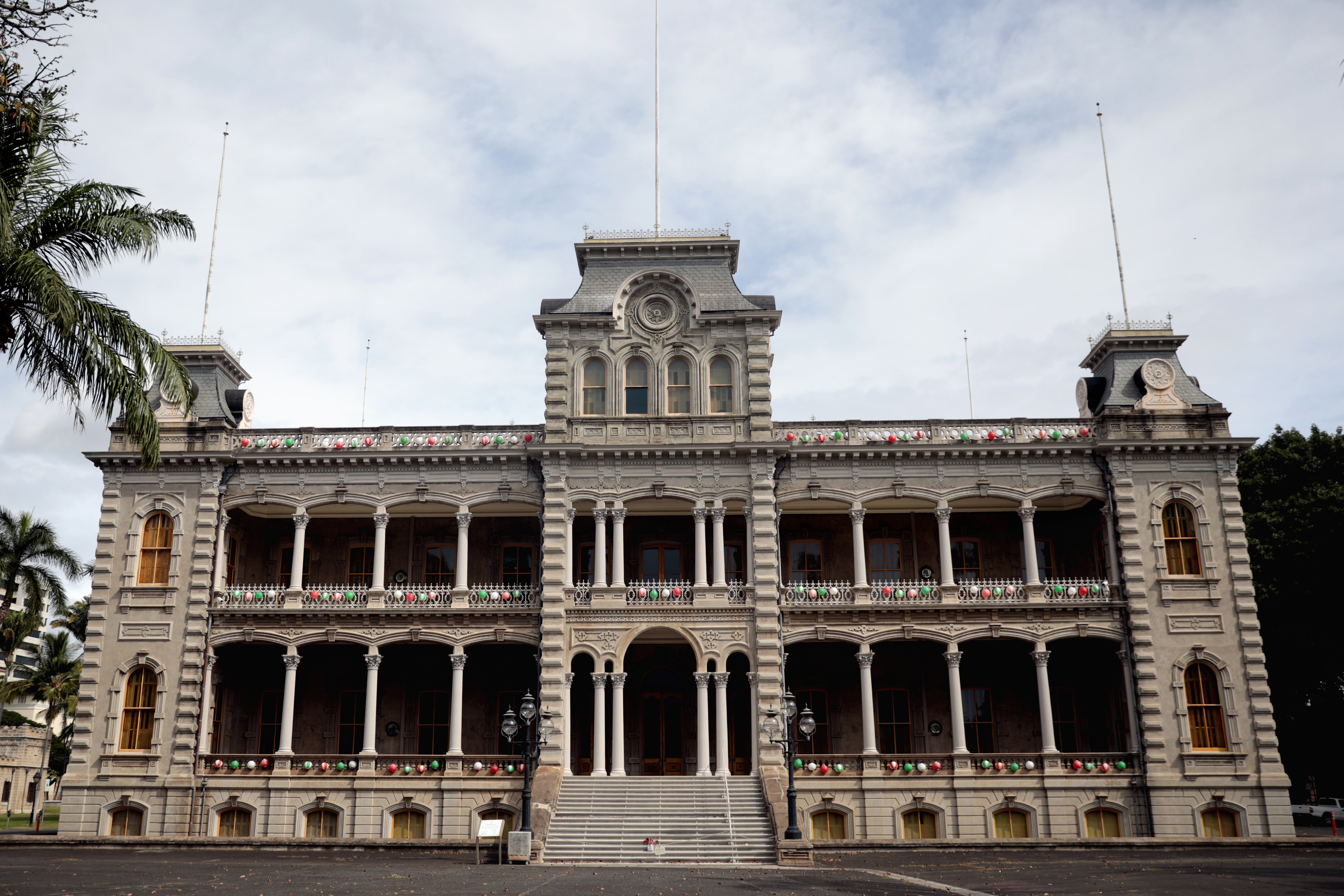
- ʻIolani Palace is the hallmark of Hawaiian renaissance architecture
- Location: Honolulu, HI
- Coordinates: 21°18′24″N 157°51′32″W
- Area: 10.6 acres (4.3 ha)
- Built: 1845 (original); 1879 (current)
- Architect: Thomas J. Baker, Charles J. Wall, Isaac Moore
- Architectural style: American Florentine
- Website: https://www.iolanipalace.org/
- Part of: Hawaii Capital Historic District (ID78001020)
- NRHP reference No.: 66000293

Significant dates
- Added to NRHP: October 15, 1966
- Designated NHL: December 29, 1962

The ʻIolani Palace (Hawaiian pronunciation: [ʔi.oˈla.ni]; Hawaiian: Hale Aliʻi ʻIolani) was the royal residence of the rulers of the Kingdom of Hawaiʻi beginning with Kamehameha III under the Kamehameha Dynasty (1845) and ending with Queen Liliʻuokalani (1893) under the Kalākaua Dynasty. It is located in the capitol district of downtown Honolulu in the U.S. state of Hawaiʻi. It is now a National Historic Landmark listed on the National Register of Historic Places. After the monarchy was overthrown in 1893, the building was used as the capitol building for the Provisional Government, Republic, Territory, and State of Hawaiʻi until 1969. The palace was restored and opened to the public as a museum in 1978. ʻIolani Palace is the only royal palace on US soil.

== Early history ==
=== Pohukaina and the House of Kamehameha ===
In the early 19th century, the site of ʻIolani Palace was near an ancient burial site known as Pohukaina. It is believed to be the name of a chief (sometimes spelled Pahukaina) who according to legend chose a cave in Kanehoalani in the Koʻolau Range for his resting place. The land belonged to Kekāuluohi, who later served as Kuhina Nui. She lived there with her husband Charles Kanaina. Kekūanaōʻa, a chief who served as Governor of Oʻahu, also had his home, called Haliʻimaile, just west of Kekāuluohi's home. Another chief, Keoni Ana, lived in Kīnaʻu Hale (which was later converted into the residence of the royal chamberlain), all members of the House of Kamehameha.

Kekāuluohi and Kanaʻina's original home was similar to that of the other estates in the neighborhood consisting of small buildings used for different purposes. The sitting and sleeping area had a folding door entrance of green painted wood under glass upper panels. The house had two rooms separated by a festooned tent door of chintz fabric and was carpeted with hand crafted makaloa mats. In the front was a lounge area opposite a sideboard and mirror. In the middle they placed a semi circle of armchairs with a center table where the couple would write. Four matching cabinet-bookshelves with glass doors were set in each corner of the room with silk scarves hanging from each. In his book, A visit to the South Seas, in the U.S. Ship Vincennes: during the years 1829 and 1830, Charles Samuel Stewart describes the area and homes in detail.

Next to Kekāuluohi and Kanaʻina's home was an old estate that had been demolished called Hanailoia. According to oral history, Hanailoia was the former site of a destroyed heiau called Kaʻahaimauli.

==== Tomb ====
Pohukaina was a sacred burial site for the aliʻi (ruling class). Years after 1825, the first Western-style royal tomb was constructed for the bodies of King Kamehameha II and his queen Kamāmalu. They were buried on August 23, 1825. The design was heavily influenced by the tombs at Westminster Abbey during Kamehameha II's trip to London. The mausoleum was a small house made of coral blocks with a thatched roof. It had no windows, and it was the duty of two chiefs to guard the iron-locked koa door day and night. No one was allowed to enter the vault except for burials or Memorial Day, a Hawaiian holiday celebrated on December 30.

Over time, as more bodies were added, the small vault became crowded, so other chiefs and retainers were buried in unmarked graves nearby. In 1865 a selected eighteen coffins were removed to the Royal Mausoleum of Hawaiʻi, called Mauna ʻAla, in Nuʻuanu Valley. But many chiefs remain on the site including: Keaweʻīkekahialiʻiokamoku, Kalaniʻōpuʻu, Chiefess Kapiʻolani, and Haʻalilio. A lead coffin belonging to Kekupuohi (died 1836), one of the wives of Kamehameha I, was uncovered in 1931.

After being overgrown for many years, the Hawaiian Historical Society passed a resolution in 1930 requesting Governor Lawrence Judd to memorialize the site with the construction of a metal fence enclosure and a plaque.

According to tradition, Pohukaina was built on the site of a former cave.

=== Hale Aliʻi ===
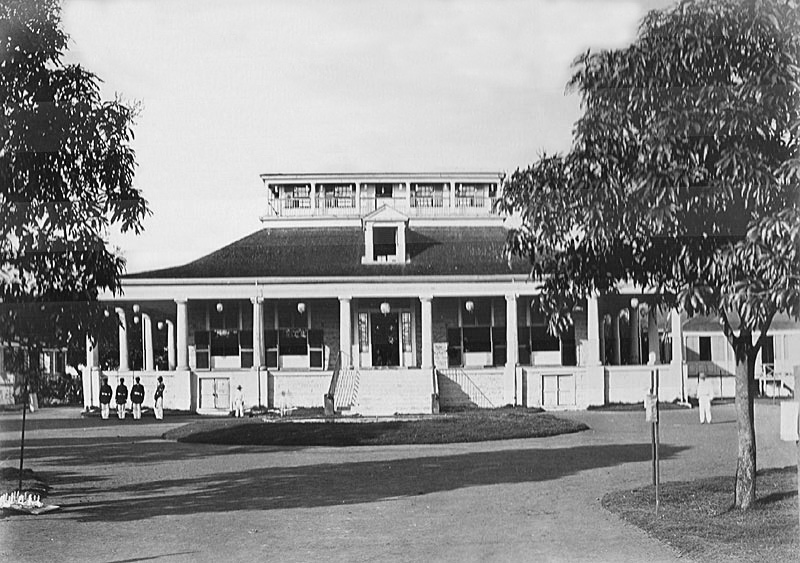
The original ʻIolani Palace, the grandest house of its time in Honolulu, built by Mataio Kekūanaōʻa for his daughter, Princess Victoria Kamāmalu

In July 1844, Kekūanaōʻa began building a large home at the site of the current palace as a gift to his daughter Victoria Kamāmalu. Instead, Kamehameha III purchased the estate and used the home as his royal residence after moving the capital of the kingdom to Honolulu from Lāhainā. It would become the ʻIolani Palace. As older aliʻi died, the lands were passed down and concentrated into fewer hands. Kekāuluohi's lands were passed down to her from the Kamehameha family. When she died, she left her accumulated lands and wealth to her son, not her husband Kanaʻina however, Lunalilo predeceased his father.

The home built by Kekūanaōʻa was a wood and stone building called Hale Aliʻi meaning House of the Chiefs. It had only one-third the floor space of the present palace. Mataio Kekūanaōʻa, who was long-time Royal Governor of Oʻahu and husband of Kīnaʻu, the daughter of Kamehameha I, built the large home for his daughter Princess Victoria Kamāmalu who, from birth, was expected to rule in some capacity. It was purchased by King Kamehameha III from Kamāmalu (the King's niece) when he moved his capital from Lāhainā to Honolulu in 1845.

It was constructed as a traditional aliʻi residence with only ceremonial spaces, no sleeping rooms. It just had a throne room, a reception room, and a state dining room, with other houses around for sleeping and for retainers. Kamehameha III slept in a cooler grass hut around the palace. He called his home Hoʻihoʻikea, a separate building flanking the palace on the west side in honor of his restoration after the Paulet Affair of 1843. Kamehameha IV build a separate house on the east side of the palace called Ihikapukalani (on the mauka side) and Kauluhinano (on the makai side).

==== Name changed to ʻIolani Palace ====
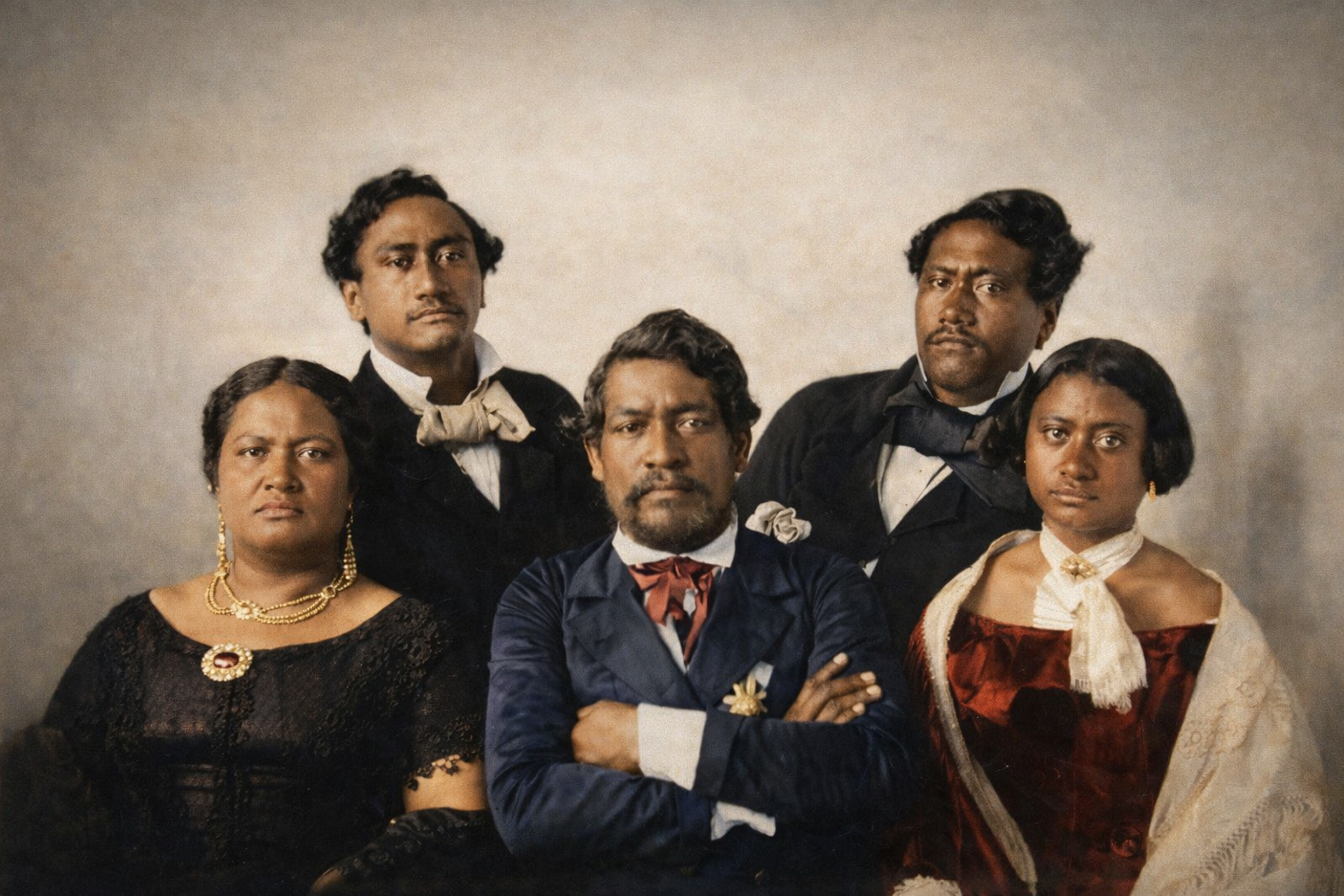
Kamehameha III with Queen Kalama to the left and Victoria Kamāmalu (original owner of the first palace) to the right with future monarchs Kamehameha IV (namesake of palace), top left and Kamehameha V, top right

During the reign of Kamehameha V, the king initially proposed renaming Hale Aliʻi as "St. Alexander Palace" in honor of his late brother, Kamehameha IV. However, the Privy Council expressed a preference for the name ʻIolani Palace, derived from one of the late king’s given names (his full name was Alexander Liholiho Keawenui ʻIolani) after the ʻIo (royal hawk). The Palace served as the official residence of the monarch during the reigns of Kamehameha III, Kamehameha IV, Kamehameha V, Lunalilo, and the first part of Kalākaua's reign. The original structure was very simple in design and was more of a stately home than a palace, but at the time, it was the grandest house in town. The palace was largely meant for receiving foreign dignitaries and state functions with the monarch preferring to sleep in private homes.

=== Seat of government ===
Kamehameha I formed his official government at Lāhainā, Maui in 1802, where he built the kingdom's first royal residence called the Brick Palace. Lāhainā remained the seat of government under the first three Kamehameha monarchs until 1845 when Kamehameha III moved the royal court. Lāhainā had been the seat of government, where the royal courts of many chiefs of Maui had been located, including Kahekili II until 1794. In 1845, Kamehameha III moved the Royal Court and capitol to Honolulu. Hale Ali'i would become the seat of government and would remain so through the subsequent Kamehameha monarchs. After 1874, the main seat of government was transferred to the new central government building left by Kamehameha V. After the overthrow, the provisional government would use the ʻIolani Palace as the seat of government. While a territory, the palace was called: The Capitol of the Territorial Government. It would also serve as the first state capitol building. The area was culturally significant as a seat of government for many reasons including the palace's size, orientation and other factors of religious importance and bridged the ancient history of Hawaiʻi with the new 19th century monarchy.

== Kalākaua's ʻIolani Palace ==
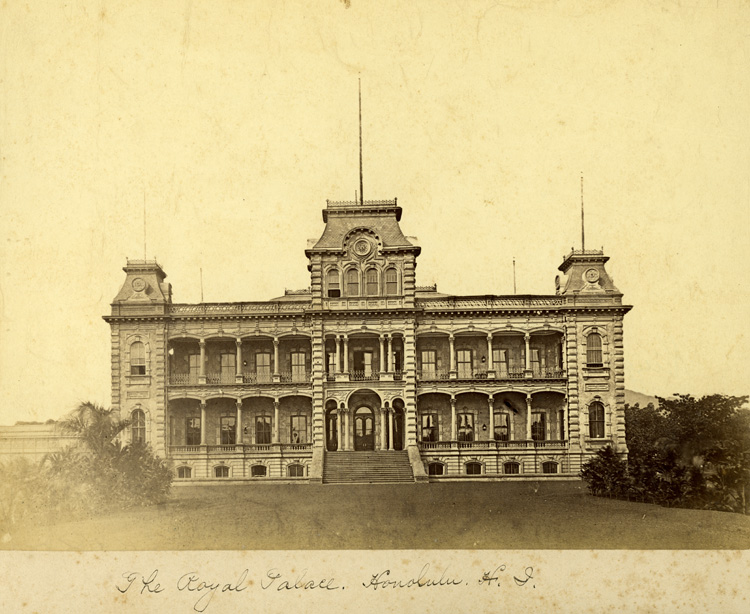
The palace shortly after construction

By the time David Kalākaua assumed the throne, the original ʻIolani Palace was in poor condition, suffering from ground termite damage. He ordered the old palace to be razed.

Kalākaua was the first monarch to travel around the world and like Kamehameha V, he dreamed of a royal palace befitting the monarch of a modern state. While visiting Europe, Kalākaua took note of the customs and traditions practiced by his contemporaries where he decided that incorporating their elements would help legitimize his kingdom through their eyes; this included the building of a new palace inspired by these European grand palaces. Thus, he commissioned the construction of a new ʻIolani Palace, directly across the street from Aliʻiōlani Hale, to become the official palace of the Hawaiian monarchy.

=== Design and construction ===
Three architects, Thomas J. Baker, Charles J. Wall, and Isaac Moore, contributed to the design; of these, Baker designed the structure, while Wall and Moore offered other details. The cornerstone was laid December 31, 1879 during the administration of Minister of the Interior Samuel Gardner Wilder. It was built of brick with concrete facing. The building was completed in November 1882 and cost over $340,000 — a vast fortune at the time ($11,343,103 in 2025 dollars). It measures about 140 feet (43 m) by 100 feet (30 m), and rises two stories over a raised basement to 54 feet (16 m) high. It has four corner towers and two in the center rising to 76 feet (23 m). On February 12, 1883, a formal coronation ceremony was held, even though Kalākaua had reigned for nine years. The coronation pavilion officially known as Keliʻiponi Hale was later moved to the southwest corner of the grounds and converted to a bandstand for the Royal Hawaiian Band.

ʻIolani Palace features architecture seen nowhere else in the world. This unique style is known as American Florentine. On the first floor a grand hall faces a staircase of koa wood. Ornamental plaster decorates the interior. The throne room (southeast corner), the blue meeting room, and the dining room adjoin the hall. The blue room included a large 1848 portrait of King Louis Philippe of France and a koa wood piano where Liliʻuokalani played her compositions for guests. Upstairs are the private library and bedrooms of the Hawaiian monarchs.

It served as the official residence of the Hawaiian monarch until the 1893 overthrow of the Kingdom of Hawaiʻi. Therein not only Liliʻuokalani, but, Queen Kapiʻolani and other royal retainers were evicted from the palace after the overthrow.

The palace is the only official state residence of royalty on U.S. soil.

=== Royal imprisonment and trial ===
Newspaper depiction of the trial of Queen Liliuokalani

Upon the overthrow of the monarchy by the Committee of Safety in 1893, troops of the newly formed Provisional Government of Hawaiʻi took control of ʻIolani Palace. After a few months government offices moved in and it was renamed the "Executive Building" for the Republic of Hawaiʻi. Government officials carefully inventoried its contents and sold at public auctions whatever furniture or furnishings were not suitable for government operations. Queen Liliʻuokalani was imprisoned for nine months in a small room on the upper floor after the second of the Wilcox rebellions in 1895. The quilt she made is still there, in a room now called the Imprisonment Room or Quilt Room. The trial was held in the former throne room.

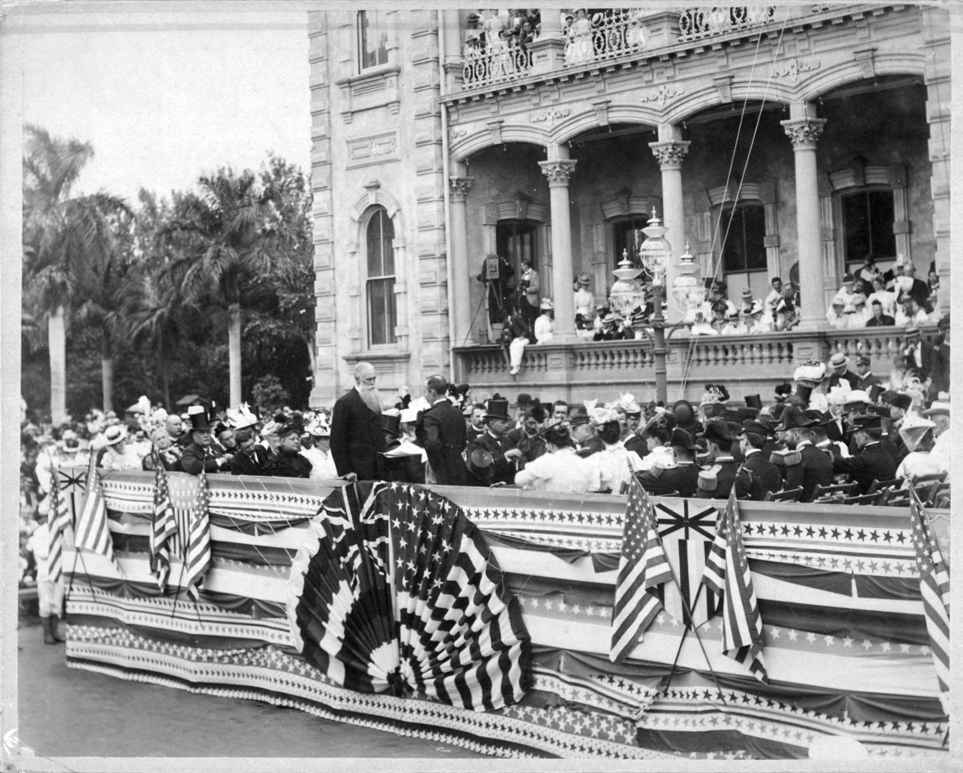
U.S. Minister to Hawaiʻi Harold M. Sewall (right) accepts the transfer of Hawaiian state sovereignty from President Sanford Dole, August 12, 1898 on the steps of ʻIolani Palace

When a proposed annexation treaty up for ratification, the Hawaiian Patriotic League held a protest rally at the palace on September 6, 1897. They gathered petition signatures in an effort to demonstrate the treaty did not have popular support. On August 12, 1898, U.S. troops from the USS Philadelphia came ashore and raised the Flag of the United States at the palace to mark the annexation by the Newlands Resolution. The Queen and other Hawaiian nobles did not attend, staying at Washington Place instead. The building served as the capitol of the Territory of Hawaiʻi, the military headquarters during World War II, and the State of Hawaiʻi. During the government use of the palace, the second-floor royal bedroom became the governor's office, while the legislature occupied the entire first floor. The representatives met in the former throne room and the senate in the former dining room.

When Liliʻuokalani died in 1917, territorial governor Lucius E. Pinkham accorded her the honor of a state funeral in the throne room of the palace.

=== Archives ===
After annexation, there was a fear that all records would be moved to the mainland. Since an 1847 effort by Robert Crichton Wyllie, a set of archives had been kept of all kingdom records. A new fireproof building was built in 1906 on the grounds just to the southeast of the palace. It included a vault 30 feet (9.1 m) by 40 feet (12 m) with steel shelves. At first it was to be called the Hall of Records, but the name Archives of Hawaiʻi made it clear the documents included those from the kingdom. A new Kekāuluohi building provides digital access to some of the collections.

== Palace restoration ==
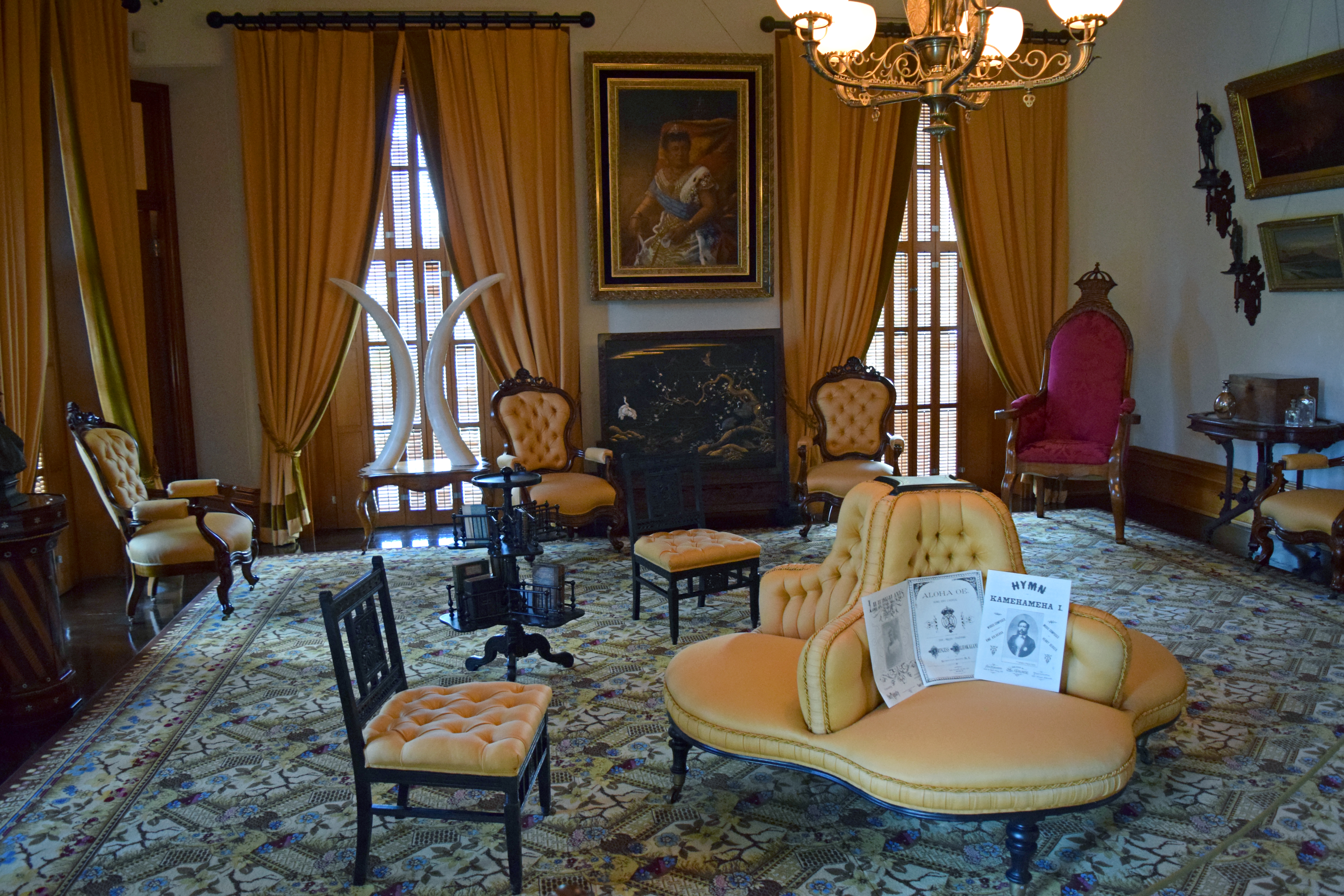
Interior of the music room with donations and artifacts in the restored palace

In 1930 the interior of ʻIolani Palace was remodeled, and wood framing replaced by steel and reinforced concrete. The name ʻIolani Palace was officially restored in 1935. During World War II, it served as the temporary headquarters for the military governor in charge of martial law in the Hawaiian Islands.

Hawaiʻi residents of Japanese ancestry who were accepted for service in the U.S. Army became the core of the 442nd Infantry Regiment. Before leaving Hawaiʻi for training on the mainland, they were sworn in during a mass ceremony on the grounds of the Palace.

Through more than 70 years as a functional but neglected government building, the Palace fell into disrepair. After Hawaiʻi became a state, Governor John A. Burns began an effort to restore the palace in the 1960s. The first step was to move the former ʻIolani Barracks building from its original position northeast of the palace. It now serves as a visitors center for the palace.

ʻIolani Palace was designated a National Historic Landmark on December 29, 1962 and added as site 66000293 to the National Register of Historic Places listings in Oʻahu on October 15, 1966. Government offices vacated the Palace in 1969 and moved to the newly constructed Hawaiʻi State Capitol building on the former barracks site. In preparation for restoration, the Junior League of Honolulu researched construction, furnishings, and palace lifestyle in nineteenth-century newspapers, photographs and archival manuscripts. Overseeing the restoration was The Friends of ʻIolani Palace, founded by Liliʻuokalani Kawānanakoa Morris, grand-niece of Queen Kapiʻolani. Two wooden additions were removed and the interior was restored based on original plans.

Through the efforts of acquisitions researchers and professional museum staff, and donations of individuals, many original Palace objects have been returned. Government grants and private donations funded reproduction of original fabrics and finishes to restore Palace rooms to their monarchy-era appearance. ʻIolani Palace opened to the public in 1978 after structural restoration of the building was completed. In the basement is a photographic display of the Palace, orders and decorations given by the monarchs, and an exhibit outlining restoration efforts.

The grounds of ʻIolani Palace are managed by the Hawaiʻi State Department of Land and Natural Resources but the palace building itself is managed as a historical house museum by the Friends of ʻIolani Palace, a non-profit non-governmental organization. The birthdays of King Kalākaua (November 16) and Queen Kapiʻolani (December 28) are celebrated with ceremonies.

ʻIolani Palace is one of the only places in Hawaiʻi where the flag of Hawaiʻi can officially fly alone without the American flag; the other three places are Puʻuhonua o Hōnaunau Heiau, the Mauna ʻAla and Thomas Square.

== Contemporary events ==
On January 17, 1993, a massive observation was held on the grounds of ʻIolani Palace to mark the 100th anniversary of the overthrow of the Hawaiian monarchy. A torchlight vigil was held at night, with the palace draped in black.

On April 30, 2008, ʻIolani Palace was overtaken by a group of native Hawaiians who called themselves the Hawaiian Kingdom Government to protest what they view as illegitimate rule by the United States. Mahealani Kahau, "head of state" of the group, said they do not recognize Hawaiʻi as a U.S. state, but would keep the occupation of the palace peaceful. "The Hawaiian Kingdom Government is here and it doesn't plan to leave. This is a continuity of the Hawaiian Kingdom of 1892 to today," Kahau said. Friends of ʻIolani Palace released a statement stating: "We respect the freedom of Hawaiian groups to hold an opinion on the overthrow of the Hawaiian Kingdom, we believe that blocking public access to ʻIolani Palace is wrong and certainly detrimental to our mission to share the Palace and its history with our residents, our keiki (children), and our visitors."

=== In popular culture ===
An exterior view of the Palace was frequently shown on the 1968 TV show Hawaii Five-O, suggesting it hosted the offices of the fictional state police unit featured on the show. It was also later portrayed in the late 1980s and early 1990s as the headquarters of the Honolulu Prosecuting Attorney, including Jason McCabe, in the TV series Jake and the Fatman.

A movie titled Princess Kaiulani about Princess Victoria Kaʻiulani Cleghorn was filmed at the palace in 2008.

== Gallery ==
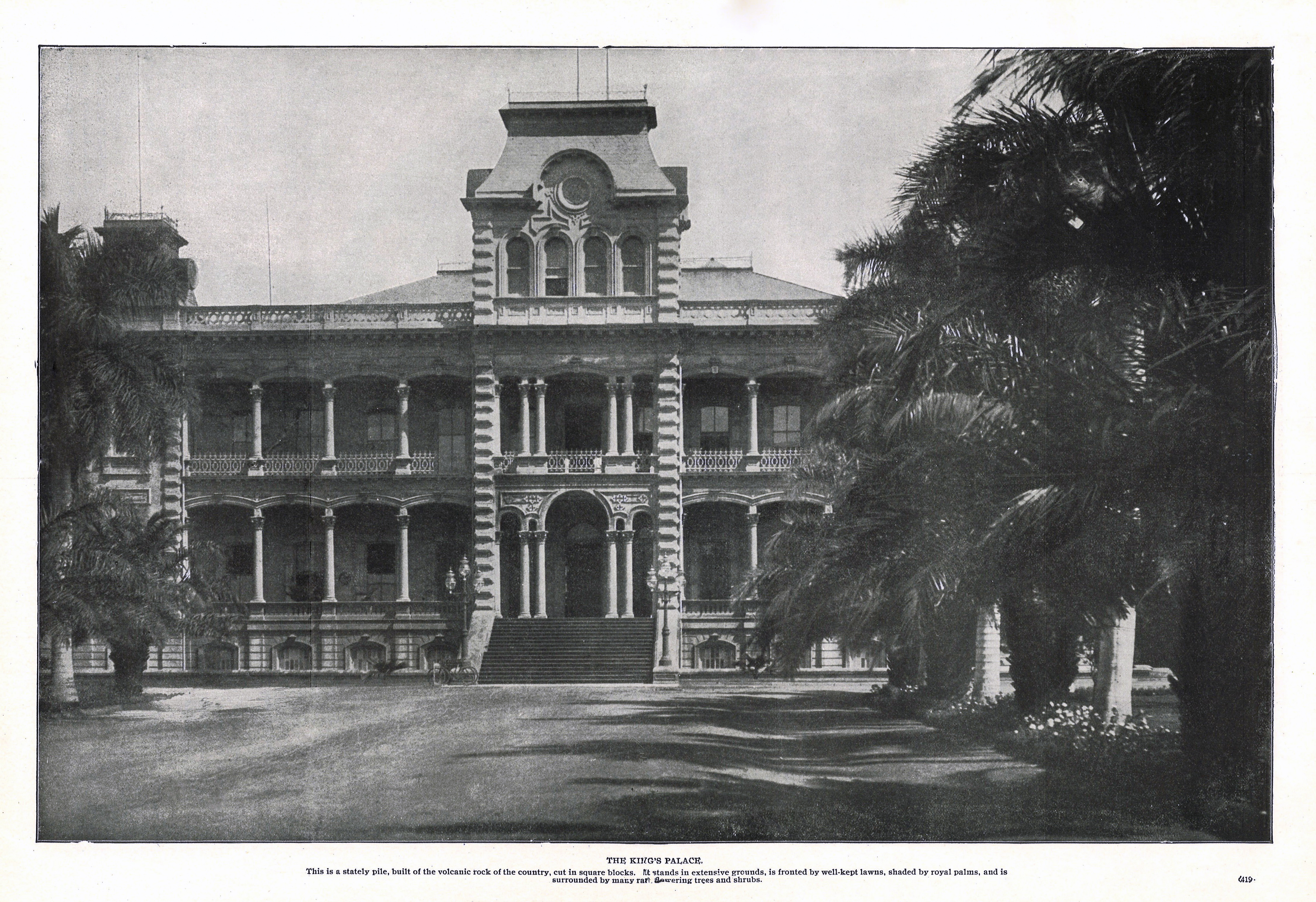
ʻIolani Palace in 1899

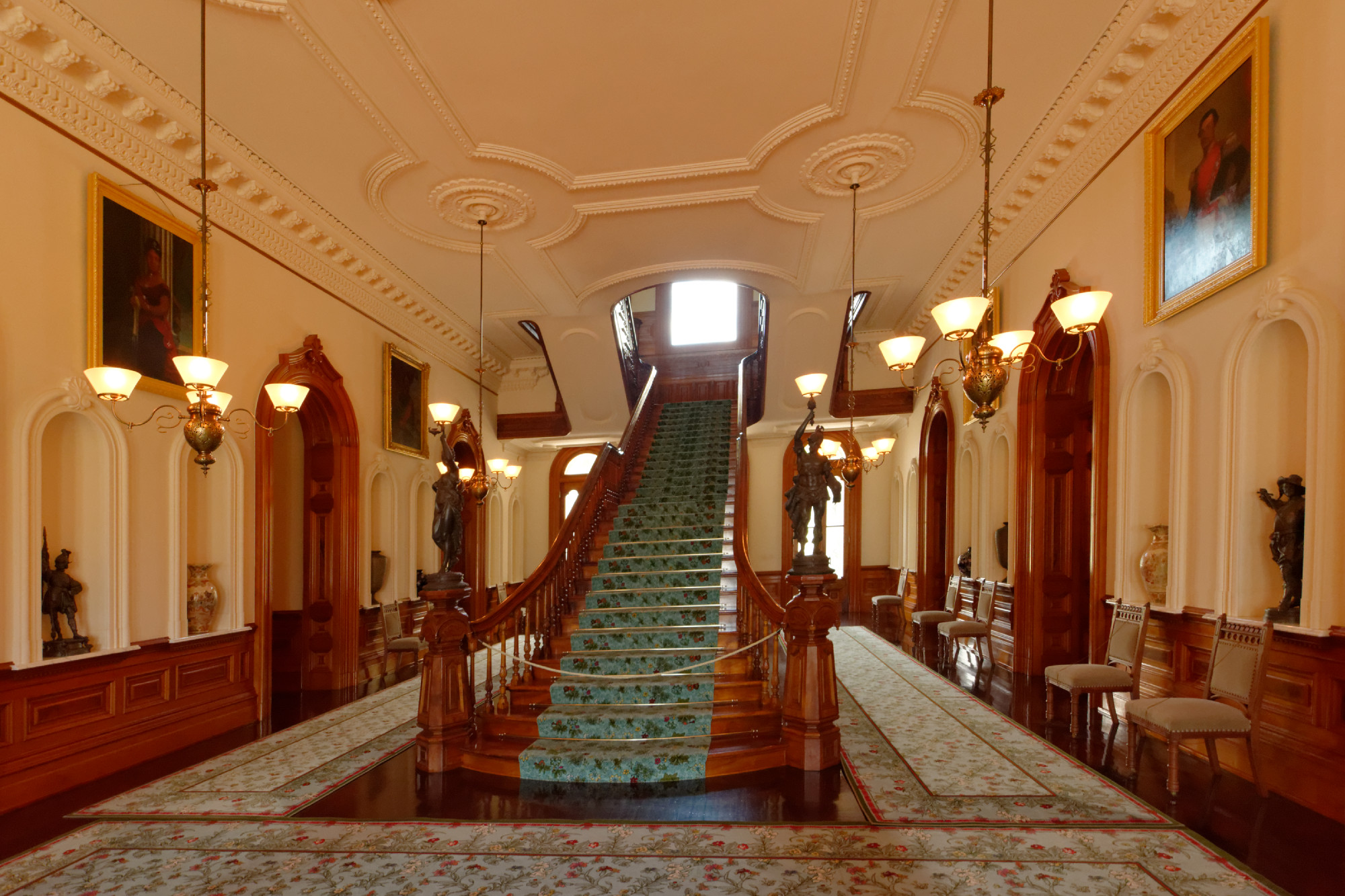
Grand Staircase

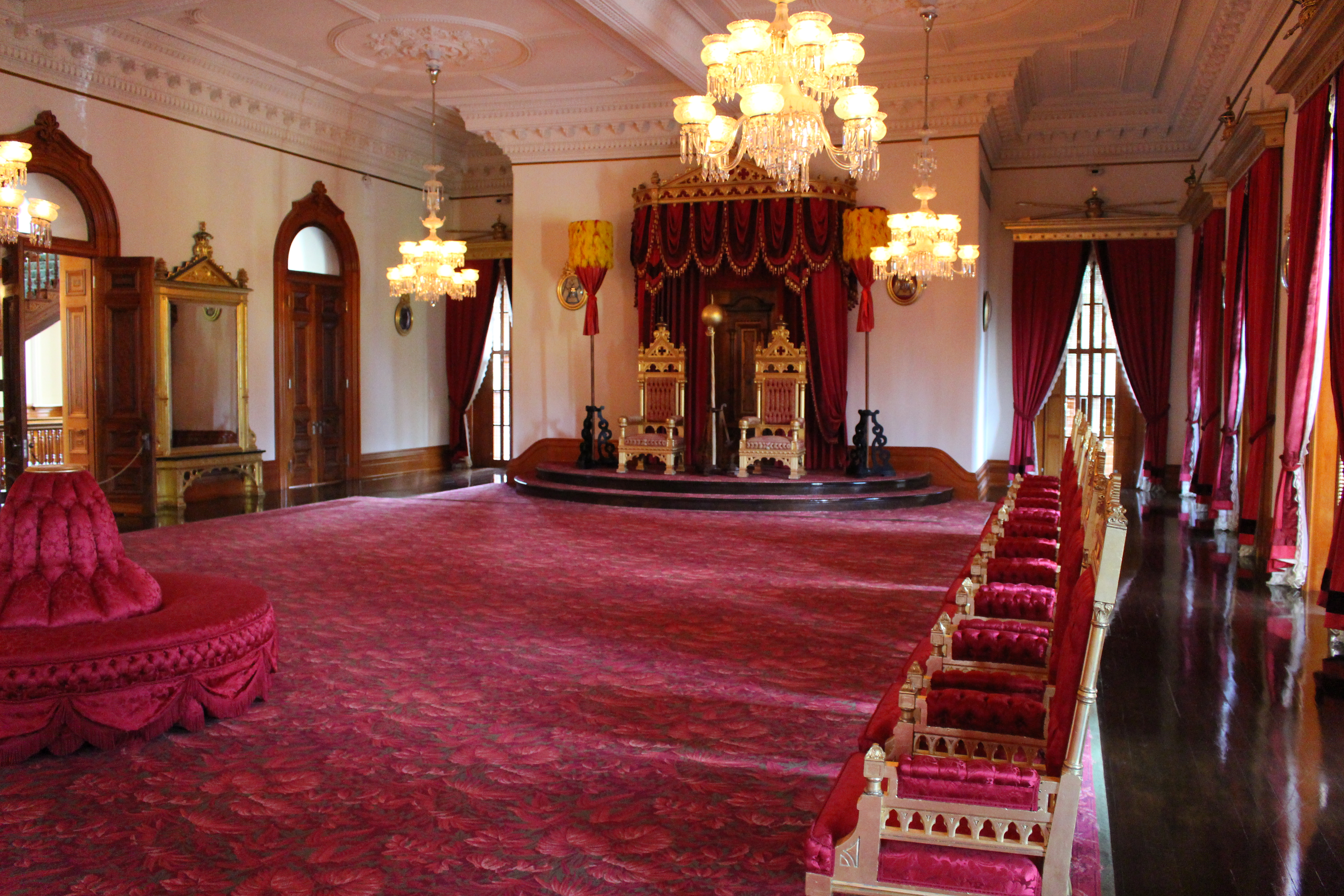
Throne Room

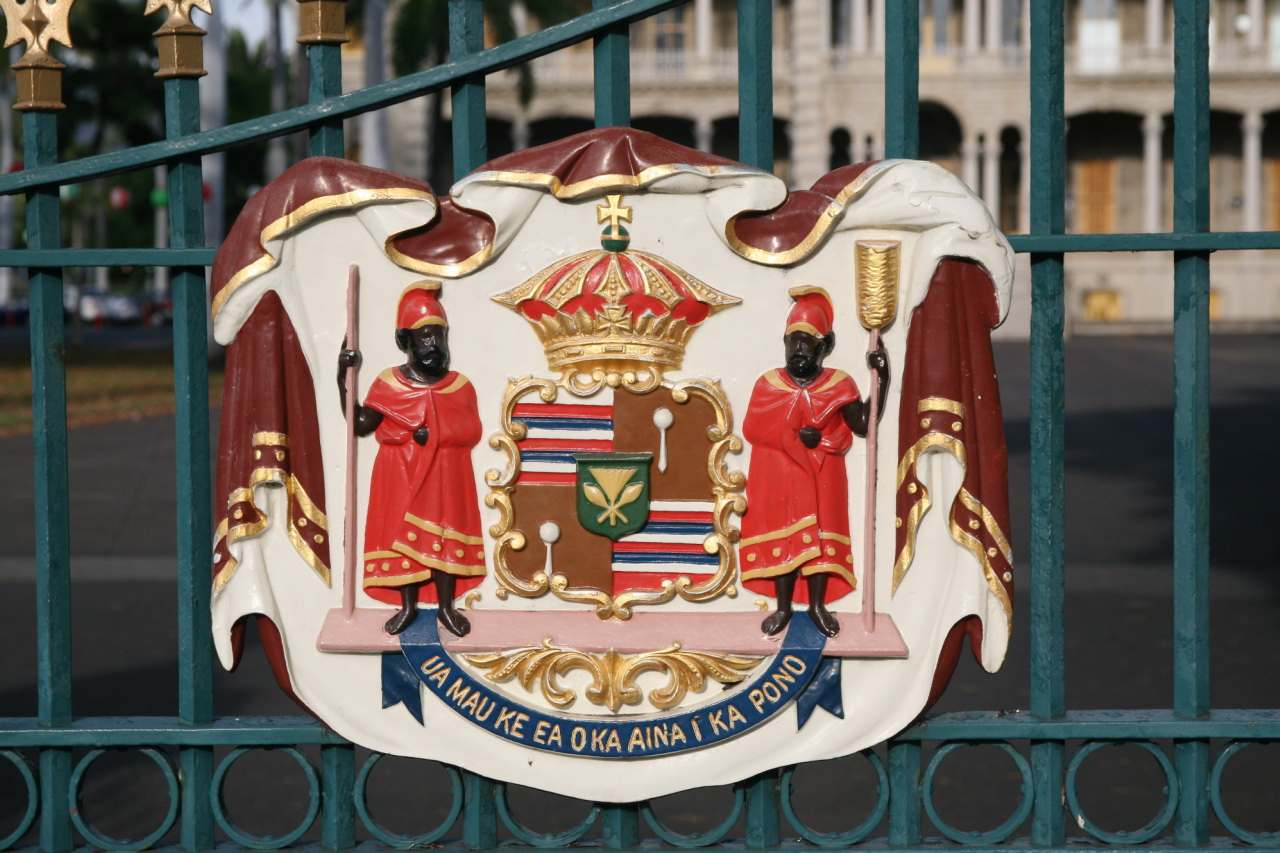
Palace gate displaying the Royal Arms of the Hawaiian Kingdom

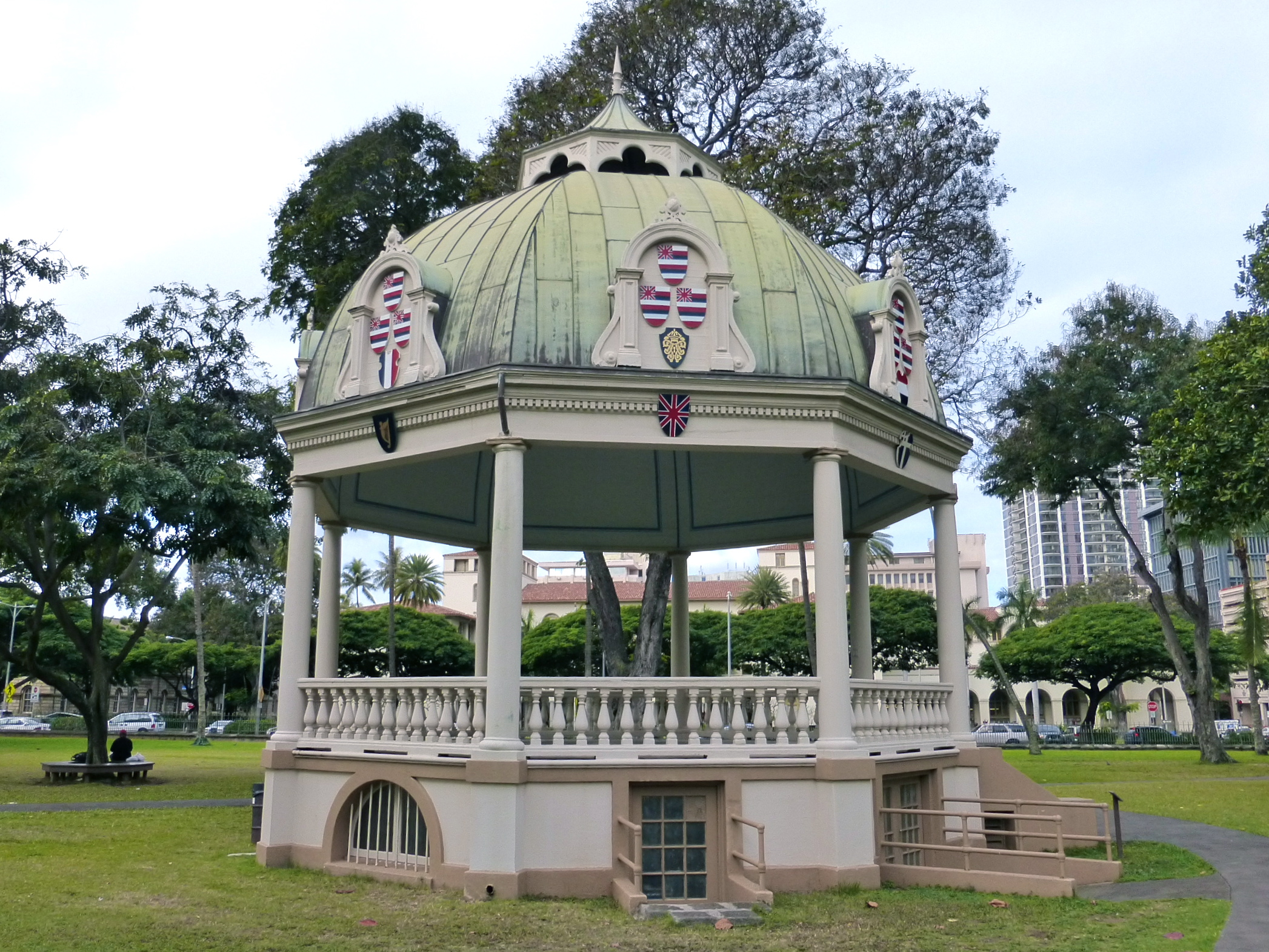
Coronation Bandstand at ʻIolani Palace

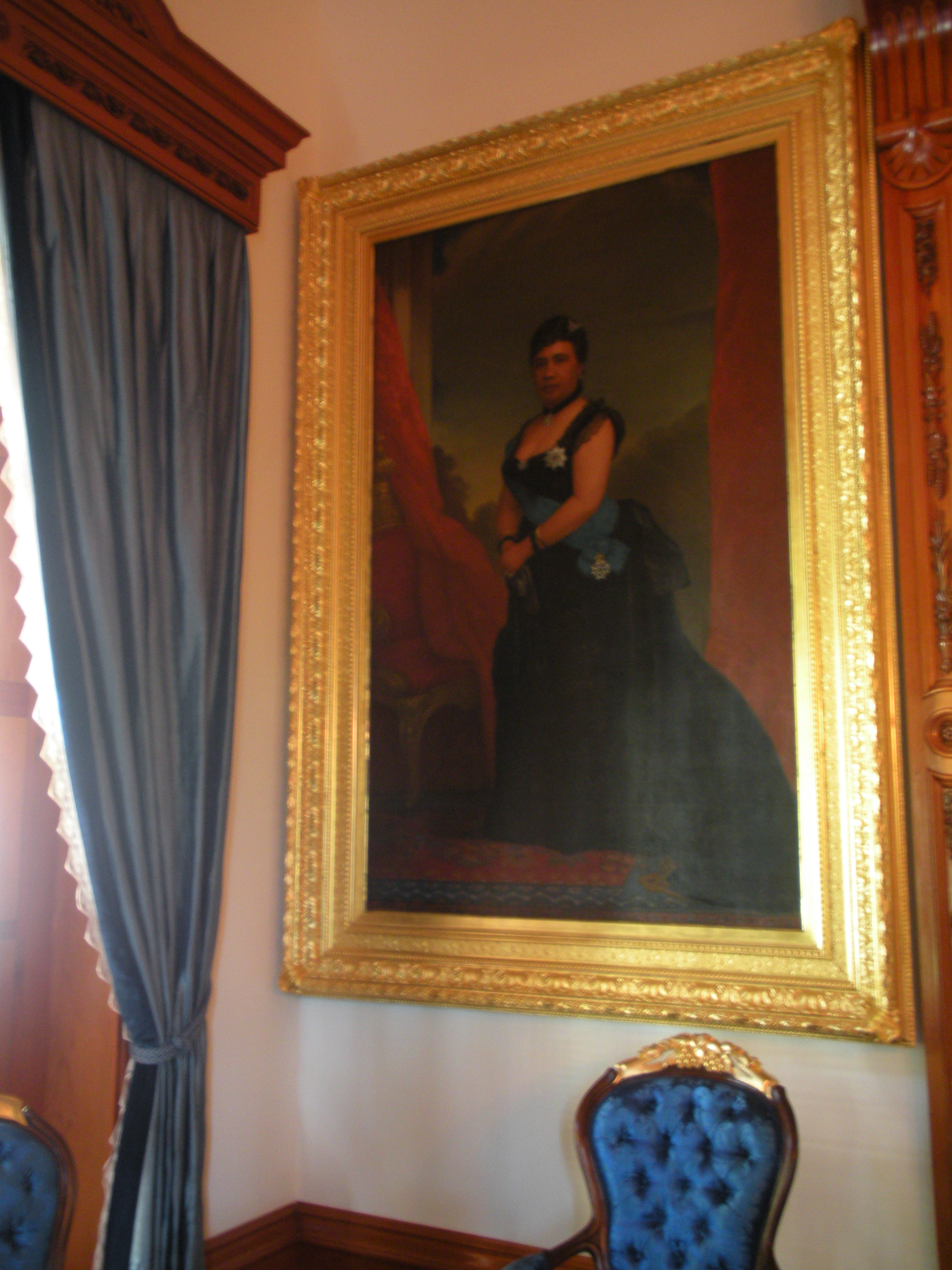
Drawing Room - portrait of Liliʻuokalani

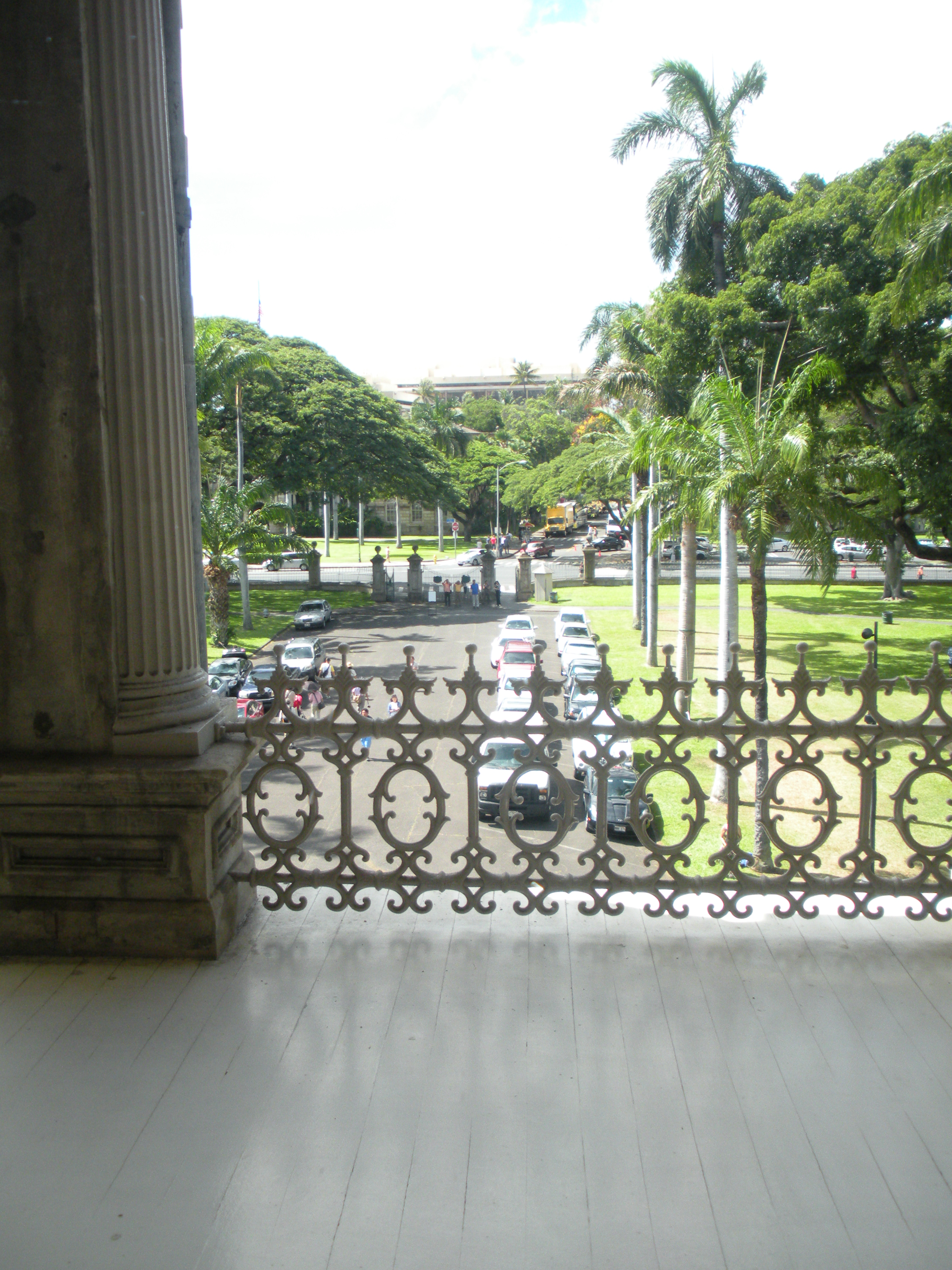
Lānai where Queen Liliʻuokalani walked in the evenings of 1895–1896, when she was held captive in the palace
