= Ladd & Co. =

Ladd & Company was an early business partnership in the Kingdom of Hawaii. Its founders were William Ladd (1807–1863), Peter Allen (or Allan) Brinsmade (1804–1859), and William Northey Hooper (1809–1878). The company was behind the first commercial sugarcane plantation and first international land speculation in the Hawaiian Islands.

== Founders ==
William Ladd was born May 11, 1807, in Hallowell, Maine. His father, John Ladd, sailed for South America and died about 1820. The younger Ladd married Lucretia Goodale (1807–1874) who was related to an earlier missionary to Hawaii, Lucy Goodale Thurston. Ladd's daughter Mary (1840–1908) married Joseph Oliver Carter (1835–1909), son of another Bostonian, Captain Joseph Oliver Carter (1802–1850), sister of diplomat Henry A. P. Carter (1837–1891).

Peter A. Brinsmade was born on April 1, 1804, in New Hartford, Connecticut. He graduated from Bowdoin College in 1826 and attended Andover Seminary 1826–1828 and Yale Theological Seminary 1828–1829. He married Elizabeth Goodale of Hallowell, Maine, sister of Lucretia in 1830.

William Northey Hooper was born October 16, 1809, in Manchester, Massachusetts. His father was sea captain William Hooper (1771–1809) and his mother was Sally Northey. Hooper married Charlotte Augusta Wood.

The three men sailed on the Hellespont from Boston in 1832. They arrived in Honolulu on July 27, 1833.

== Hawaii ==
The first venture of Ladd & Co. was a store in Honolulu opened in July 1833. It was on a prime site of waterfront land at Honolulu Harbor, coordinates 21°18′37″N 157°51′50″W. Because of Brinsmade's theological training, they were sometimes called the "Pious Traders". The partners erected a large stone house and other buildings that served as family housing, offices, and storage. They would first use a sunken ship's hulk as a wharf and later build a more permanent one. The business, however, barely supported their families.

In 1835 Ladd & Co. leased 980 acres (400 ha) for a sugarcane plantation in Kōloa on the island of Kauaʻi from Royal Governor Kaikioewa. The project had the support of conservative missionaries such as Hiram Bingham I.

Although sugarcane had been raised by ancient Hawaiians on small personal plots, this was the first large-scale commercial production in Hawaii. Joseph Goodrich of the Hilo mission and Samuel Ruggles of the Kona Mission had experimented with using agriculture to support their missions as well as give employment to their students. After trying unsuccessfully to get Rev. Goodrich to run the operation, Hooper moved to the land as manager, despite having no training in engineering nor agriculture.

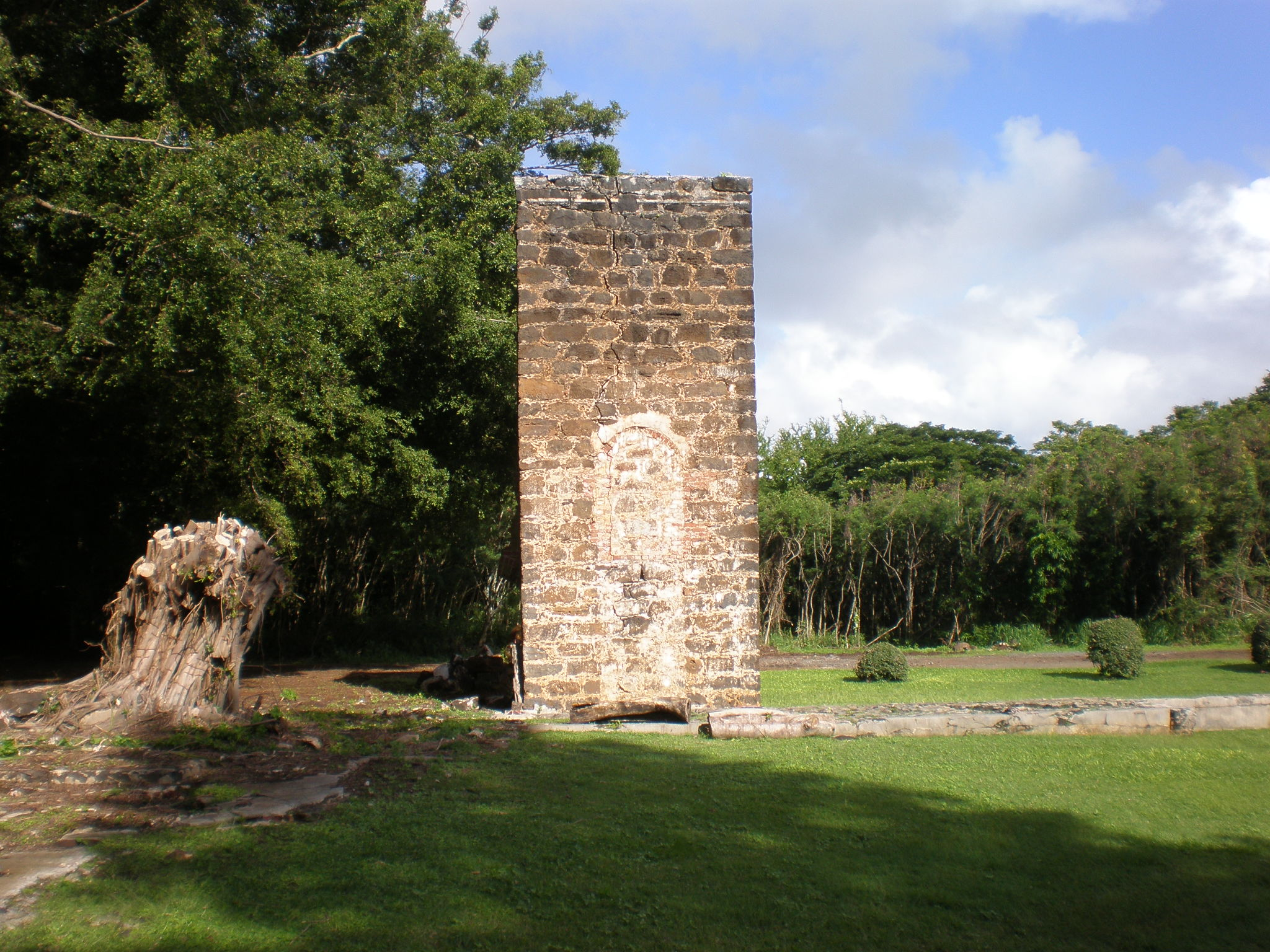
Ruins of the Ladd sugar mill

The first planting was in September 1835, and although a small amount of molasses was produced in 1836, the wooden rollers in the mill were replaced with iron ones for increased production. By 1837, the mill produced over 4,000 pounds (1,800 kg) of sugar and 700 US gallons (2,600 L) of molasses . A subsequent mill, whose ruins are still visible, was built from 1839 to 1841. This Kōloa Sugar Mill is now a National Historic Landmark.

On April 13, 1839, Peter Brinsmade was appointed American consular agent after John Coffin Jones. This was originally an unpaid position of the lowest rank in the United States Department of State. In July 1844 he was promoted to the rank of Consul. William Hooper would act as deputy when Brinsmade was on his extended trip away from the islands. Their duties were reporting on commerce and protecting American citizens. Hooper sailed to Boston in 1840 but returned by May 1841.

In November 1841 the partners negotiated a much larger deal with William Richards, a former missionary who was now a political advisor. The idea was to form a joint stock company to develop all unoccupied land in the kingdom. Richards thought that adding a clause that invalidated the agreement unless Hawaii continued to be an independent country would help investors pressure world powers to protect its government. Brinsmade traveled back to the United States trying to find investors. He could not get any takers. He then went to Britain, and then France. He met up with Timothy Haʻalilio who was sent with Richards to negotiate for official recognition. Finally, they seemed to find a partner in Belgium: Brinsmade convinced the Belgian Colonization Company headed by King Leopold I of Belgium on May 16, 1843, to sign a contract. The agreement would transfer stock in Ladd & Co. to the Belgian investors in exchange for a badly needed infusion of cash.

Just then news arrived that the Hawaiian islands had been taken under a military occupation called the Paulet Affair. The clause that was supposed to help guarantee Hawaii's independence now made the deal grind to a halt. James F. B. Marshall, a young associate of Ladd & Co., had secretly made his way to London with letters from Kamehameha III presenting his side of the occupation. Brinsmade met him in London and desperately negotiated with the British foreign office. Lord Aberdeen who was British Secretary of State for Foreign Affairs, had been told by British Consul Richard Charlton that Americans were granted a land monopoly. Brinsmade convinced Aberdeen that he would be happy to take investors from any country, using the Belgium contract as his proof. Finally, on November 28, 1844, a joint declaration with Britain and France recognized Hawaii's independence. Marshall had returned to Hawaii while Richards and Haʻalilio tried to get the United States to also recognize the Hawaiian Kingdom.

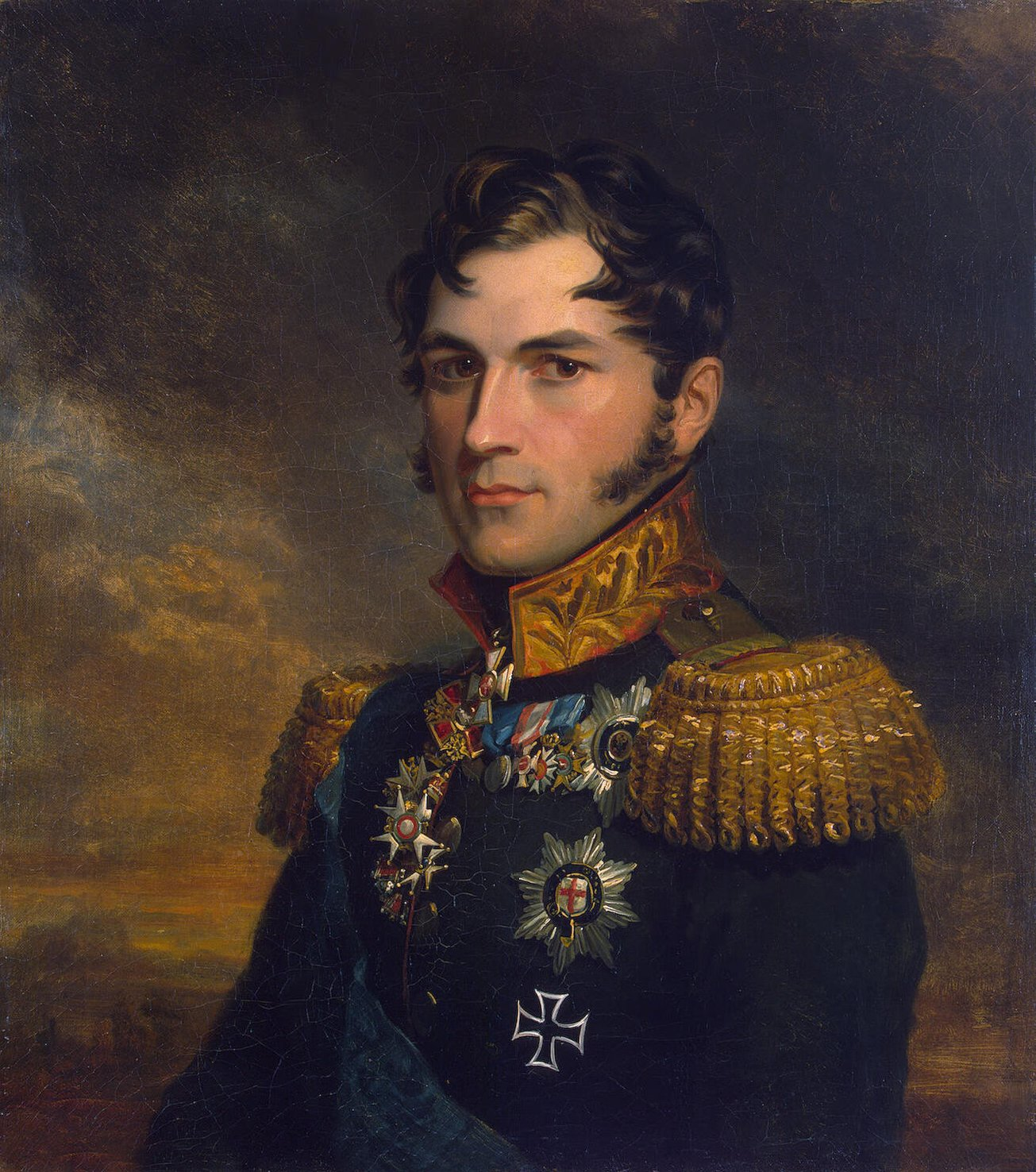
King Leopold was expected to be their investor

Brinsmade stayed in Europe trying to collect, but the investors were now wary. Meanwhile, Ladd & Co. was borrowing heavily to finance new facilities for its expected expansion. Some of this money came from the King himself. The U.S. State Department replaced Brinsmade as Consul during his absence in January 1845 by Alexander G. Abell. For the first time, a diplomatic representative called "Commissioner", George Brown, also was appointed in March 1843, in addition to the trade representative. Gerrit P. Judd, the Finance Minister of the Kingdom, realized the government itself was short of cash and called in their loan. Judd and Richards convinced the Hawaiian government to disavow the deal. At least one historian notes a factor in losing the support of the American Protestant missionaries was that the Belgians were generally Catholic.

When a newspaper report on Ladd's shaky financial situation got back to Belgium, the investors pulled out of the deal for good. Brinsmade returned to Hawaii empty-handed in March 1846.

With no incoming cash, the Honolulu Ladd & Co. had shut down in November 1844. As the company liquidated, they felt they were owed money by the government, but the case required lengthy arbitration. Both the British and Americans accused the Kingdom of being biased against them.

Then Brinsmade sued newspaper publisher James Jackson Jarves for libel for publishing the story. There was now an official Attorney General for the first time in Hawaii: John Ricord. However, several parties to the lawsuits did not recognize his authority, so this case was added to the arbitration. In June 1846 the new American Commissioner Anthony Ten Eyck arrived, who served as lawyer for the company. Joel Turrill took over as the new Consul. After many hearings, which were treated as entertaining theater by the Honolulu residents, Ladd & Co. gave up recovering anything. By October 1846 Charles Reed Bishop and William Little Lee arrived from New York. Lee would organize a court system and become its chief justice. Bishop would help sort out the accounts of Ladd & Co., then start Hawaii's first bank and inherit the largest landholdings in the islands.

== New speculation ==
The old Ladd store and house complex was auctioned off, and one of the new tenants was Robert Cheshire Janion, founder of what would become Theo H. Davies & Co. Part of their wharf was used by Charles Brewer of C. Brewer & Co. These became two of the "Big Five" corporations dominating the Hawaiian economy in later decades. The Kōloa plantation was repossessed by the Hawaiian government and sold to Robert Wood, Hooper's brother-in-law, who ran it until 1874. It was purchased by the McBryde family in 1899, who operated it until shut down in 1996 as part of Alexander & Baldwin.

Brinsmade published a few articles in a new newspaper called the Sandwich Islands News which had been started to counter Jarves' paper. Brinsmade sailed to San Francisco as part of the California Gold Rush, where he worked for newspapers and attempted various businesses for prospectors. He returned to Massachusetts where he died October 6, 1859.

Hooper also sailed to San Francisco in November 1848 and worked for Cross, Hobson & Co. where he died on December 31, 1878.

Ladd died February 8, 1863, in Honolulu. Ladd and his brother, John Ladd, who died October 11, 1859, were buried in Oahu Cemetery.

== See also ==
- Relations between the Kingdom of Hawaii and the United States
- United States Minister to Hawaii
