= Henry A. Foster =

American lawyer, judge, and politician

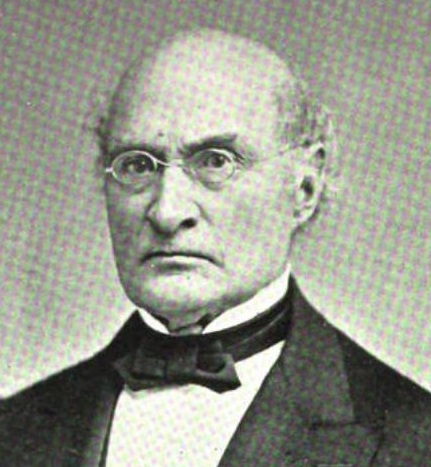

United States Senator from New York
- In office November 30, 1844 – January 27, 1845
- Appointed by: William C. Bouck
- Preceded by: Silas Wright
- Succeeded by: John A. Dix

Member of the U.S. House of Representatives from New York's 17th district
- In office March 4, 1837 – March 3, 1839
- Preceded by: Rutger B. Miller
- Succeeded by: David P. Brewster

Personal details
- Born: Henry Allen Foster; May 7, 1800 Hartford, Connecticut, U.S.
- Died: May 11, 1889 (aged 89) Rome, New York, U.S.
- Resting place: Rome Cemetery in Rome, NY
- Party: Democratic

Henry Allen Foster (May 7, 1800 – May 11, 1889) was an American lawyer and politician from New York. He served one term in the U.S. House of Representatives from 1837 to 1839 and was briefly a United States senator from 1844 to 1845.

== Life ==
His family moved to Cazenovia, New York when he was a boy. He was admitted to the bar in 1822, and commenced practice in Rome, New York.

He was Surrogate Judge of Oneida County from 1827 to 1831, and from 1835 to 1839, and Rome's Town Supervisor from 1829 to 1830, and from 1833 to 1834. He was a member of the New York State Senate (5th District) from 1831 to 1834, and from 1841 to 1844, sitting in the 54th, 55th, 56th, 57th, 64th, 65th, 66th and 67th New York State Legislatures.

=== Congress ===
Foster was elected as a Democrat to the 25th United States Congress, holding office from March 4, 1837, to March 3, 1839. Afterwards, he resumed the practice of law in Rome, New York. He was appointed as a Democrat to the United States Senate to fill the vacancy caused by the resignation of Silas Wright, and served from November 30, 1844, to January 27, 1845, when a successor was elected by the State Legislature.

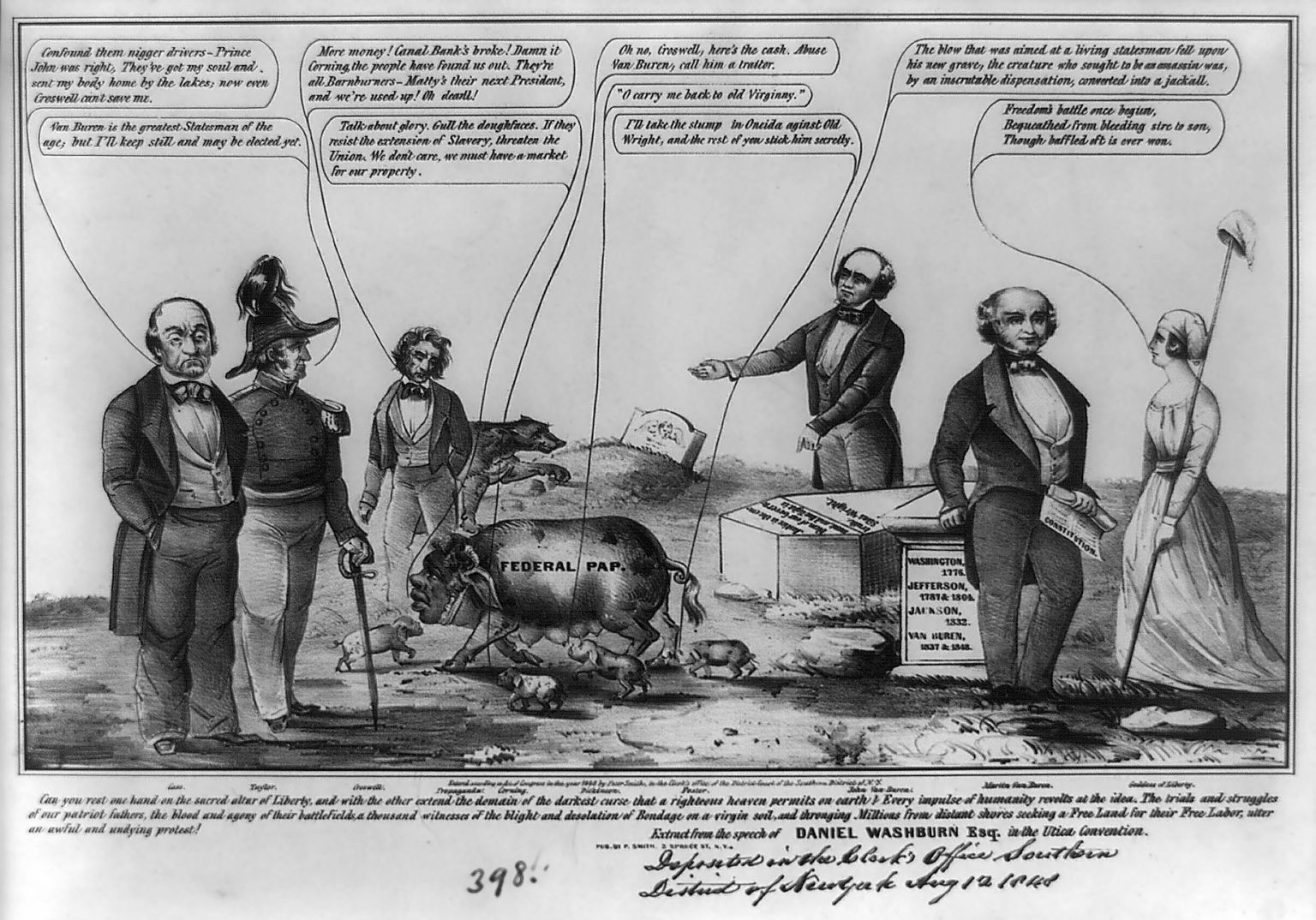
1848 caricature cartoon on the U.S. presidential race, featuring Henry Foster as a piglet

=== Later career ===
He was a justice of the New York Supreme Court (5th D.) from 1864 to 1871, and was ex officio a judge of the New York Court of Appeals in 1870. He was later President of the Board of Trustees of Hamilton College and Vice President of the American Colonization Society.

=== Death and burial ===
He died on May 11, 1899, and was buried at the Rome Cemetery in Rome, New York.

New York State Senate
Preceded by Truman Enos	New York State Senate; Fifth District (Class 4); 1831–1834	Succeeded by Abijah Beckwith
Preceded by David Wager	New York State Senate; Fifth District (Class 2); 1841–1844	Succeeded by Enoch B. Talcott
U.S. House of Representatives
Preceded by Rutger B. Miller and Joel Turrill (on a general ticket)	' Member of the U.S. House of Representatives from New York's 17th congressional district March 4, 1837 – March 3, 1839; Served alongside: Abraham P. Grant (on a general ticket)'	Succeeded by David P. Brewster and John G. Floyd (on a general ticket)
U.S. Senate
Preceded by Silas Wright	U.S. senator (Class 3) from New York; November 30, 1844 – January 27, 1845; Served alongside: Daniel S. Dickinson	Succeeded by John Adams Dix
Preceded by John Pendleton King	Most senior living U.S. senator (Sitting or former); March 19 – May 11, 1889	Succeeded by Simon Cameron
