= William Northey =

William Northey may refer to:

- William Northey (ice hockey), ice hockey executive
- William Northey (died 1770), English MP for Maidstone, Great Bedwyn and Calne
- William Northey (died 1738), English MP for Wootton Bassett and Calne
- Bill Northey, American politician

== See also ==
- William Northey Hooper, sugar producer
