= David P. Brewster =

American politician (1801–1876)

David Paine Brewster

Member of the U.S. House of Representatives from New York's 17th district
- In office March 4, 1839 – March 3, 1843
- Preceded by: Henry A. Foster
- Succeeded by: Charles S. Benton

Personal details
- Born: June 15, 1801 Cairo, New York, U.S.
- Died: February 20, 1876 (aged 74) Oswego, New York, U.S.
- Citizenship: United States
- Party: Democratic Party
- Education: Union College, Schenectady, New York
- Profession: Attorney; politician; postmaster; farmer

David Paine Brewster (June 15, 1801 – February 20, 1876) was an American lawyer and politician who served two terms as a U.S. representative from New York from 1839 to 1843. He was the great uncle of Lorenzo B. Shepard. It was in David P. Brewster's home that Lorenzo Shepard spent his formative teenage years, receiving significant guidance in law and politics.

== Early years ==
Born in Cairo, New York, Brewster attended the common schools and graduated from Union College, Schenectady, New York, in 1823. After that, he moved to New York City, where he studied law. In 1825, he was admitted to the bar and commenced practice in Oswego, New York.

== Career ==
Brewster was a trustee of the Village of Oswego in 1828, 1836 and 1845; District Attorney of Oswego County from 1829 to 1833; Supervisor of the Town of Oswego in 1833; Treasurer of the Village of Oswego from 1832 to 1834; President of the Village of Oswego in 1837. He was also an associate judge of the court of Common Pleas from 1833 to 1841.

=== Tenure in Congress ===
Brewster was elected as a Democrat to the 26th and 27th United States Congresses, holding office from March 4, 1839, to March 3, 1843.

=== Later career ===
After his political career, Brewster was appointed as Postmaster of Oswego, New York, on July 21, 1845, and served until January 10, 1849, when his successor was appointed. Returning to the practice of law, he also engaged in agricultural pursuits. Brewster served as member of the excise board commission and became its president in 1870, and held the office for three years.

== Death ==
Brewster died in Oswego, Oswego County, New York, February 20, 1876; and was interred at Riverside Cemetery, Scriba town, Oswego County, New York.

U.S. House of Representatives
Preceded by Rutger B. Miller, Abraham P. Grant	Member of the U.S. House of Representatives from New York's 17th congressional district 1839–1843 with John G. Floyd	Succeeded by Charles S. Benton
