= Manchester Cricket =

Manchester Cricket may refer to:

== Newspapers ==
- The Manchester Cricket, Manchester-by-the-Sea, Massachusetts

== Sporting organizations ==
- Manchester Cricket Club, defunct cricket club in Manchester
