= Alabama Camps =

Hawaii between the years 1835-1946 had many plantations which required forced labor in order to function. While most of the workforce was made up of immigrants from Asia, in very rare instances African American slaves were shipped to Hawaii from the mainland of the United States. These rare instances were called Alabama camps and represented discrimination against African Americans in Hawaii.

== History ==
The first plantation in Hawaii was created by William Northey Hooper, in 1836, on Koloa, Kaua’i which changed the course of Hawaiian history. Plantations exploded in Hawaii as their profits were unmatched at the time in the area thanks to the tropical climate which promoted growth of coffee, pineapple, and other crops. The immense workload was a major drawback of the plantations and as a result many foreign groups were imported as laborers to work the plantations. While Asian groups such as Japanese, Korean, and Filipinos were the most common, there were situations where African American slaves were sent to Hawaii, although there were few. They were and still are a tiny percentage of the Hawaiian population. One theorized reason is the fact that African Americans along with other minority groups experienced some of the greatest effects of major illnesses, including higher rates of heart disease, cerebrovascular, influenza, and pneumonia. Each group of people working on plantations were given a nickname and African Americans were referred to as the Alabama camps. The name of these camps came from where most of the African American slaves came from, Alabama. Dating back to 1901, these laborers were crucial to keep up with the booming sugar plantations across Hawaii.

== Race in the Alabama Camps ==
Many African Americans had viewed Hawaii as a sanctuary for them, as it never relied on a social system that involved race. It was only after it was annexed forcibly that they adopted the US view of race. Even after the adoption of America's view on race, African Americans were treated normally, as their skin tone put them alongside native Hawaiians. While still treated worse than white individuals they were treated much better than Asian Americans in Hawaii, which was reflected in how much they were paid for their work. When sent to Hawaii, African Americans became free as Hawaii outlawed slavery in 1852, though they were still treated very similarly.

== End of the camps ==
It was only in 1946 when laborers banded together and collectively left plantations that the mistreatment ended. This occurred because labor unions desperately tried to barter for better working conditions but plantation owners refused and kept pushing off meetings and promises until the unions quit altogether. African Americans assisted with this process by adding their beliefs to the polyarchy, a term used by Robert Dahl, which used many cultural views to approach problems with a unique perspective, putting the majority of people first. While not solely responsible, the African Americans' beliefs certainly made the polyarchy more diverse, which helped it to be more effective. Alongside their fellow workers, African Americans suddenly were on equal footing with those they had worked under for years, and like many others, wasted no time making a better life for themselves.

== After the camps ==
Because of the white influence in Hawaii, African Americans still faced discrimination there, with many experiencing harsher punishments simply because of their ethnicity. Eventually African Americans would be seen as equals in Hawaii through their actions, as in the case of Doris Miller who fought during the Pearl Harbor attack, and is among the Africans Americans who earned recognition in the military and in other areas. Over the years Hawaii went from using African Americans as slaves to become one of the most ethnically inclusive places in the world, nearly eliminating racism.
