= Henry Northey Hooper =

American manufacturer and merchant

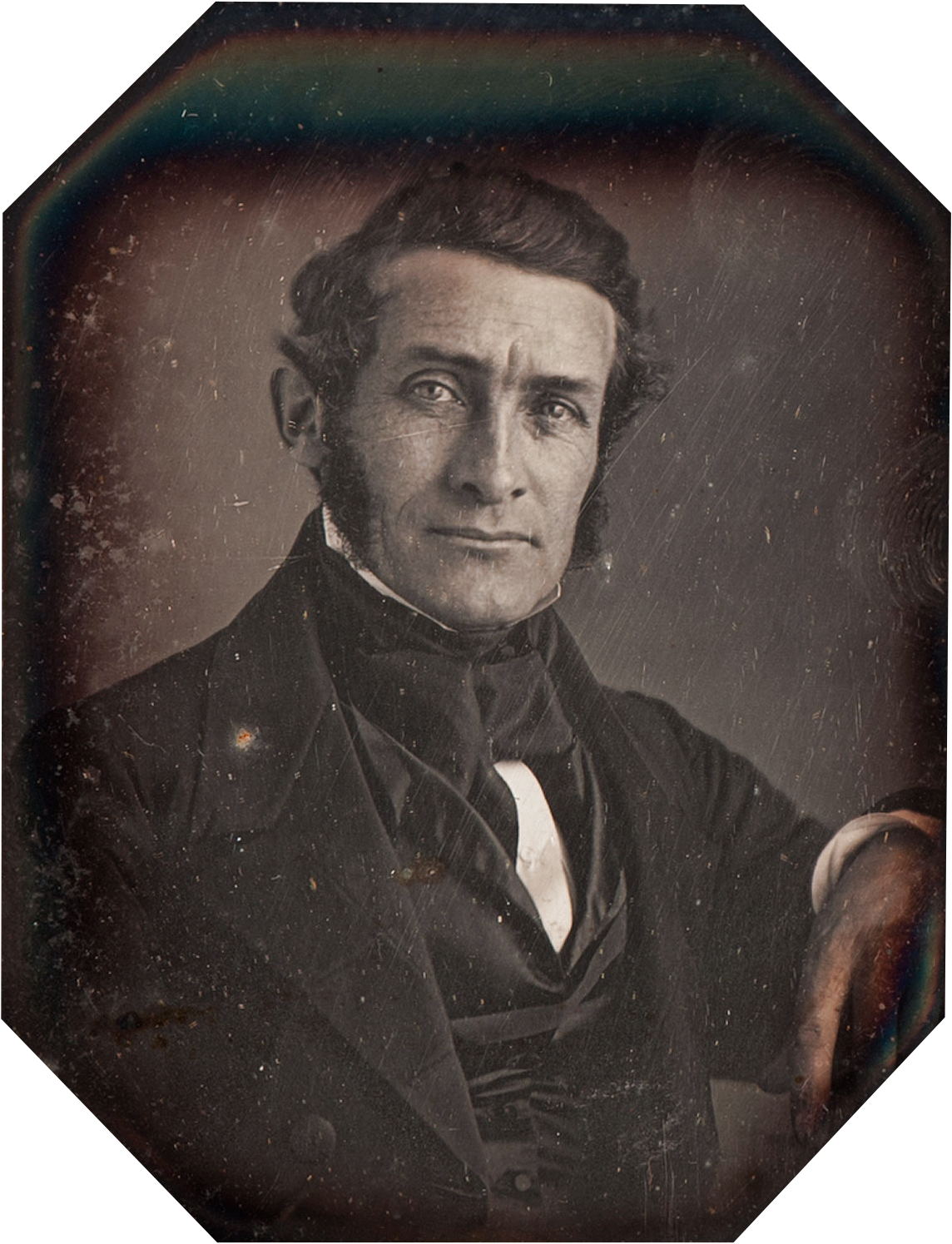
- Hooper in 1843
- Born: July 16, 1799; Manchester-by-the-Sea
- Died: September 19, 1865 (aged 66); Roxbury, Boston
- Occupation: Merchant

Henry Northey Hooper (1799 – 1865) was a 19th-century American manufacturer and merchant of decorative lighting, Civil War artillery, and bells and chimes. He was a Boston politician and foundry owner and in his firm he cast the first life-size bronze statue in the United States.

== Biography ==
Born in Manchester, Massachusetts to Captain William and Sally Northey Hooper, he descended from a line of Northey silversmiths of Salem, Gloucester, and Manchester, MA, and the Hooper family of shipmasters. Hooper initially produced nautical equipment, in which field he was educated and worked until 1825.

He was an apprentice of Paul Revere in the latter’s Boston foundry. He later purchased the foundry and established Henry N. Hooper & Co. to produce lamps and lighting fixtures, bells, and by 1862, artillery for the Union Army.

Hooper was probably best known as a manufacturer of fine decorative lighting fixtures, including chandeliers, girandoles, Argand lamps, and other cast and gilt bronze lighting. He was commissioned by the U.S. Congress to manufacture a massive chandelier for the Hall of the House of Representatives, which was hung in December 1840. The lighted 13-foot diameter, whale-oil burning fixture, weighing 7,500 lb, was described by witnesses as “exceedingly beautiful and extremely brilliant” and “without exception, the largest, most elegant, and splendid chandelier we ever beheld.” At a cost of $4,000, it featured over 10,000 cut glass pieces and 78 burners, with all of its visible metal parts finished in gold.

However, only a day after its first lighting, the massive chandelier fell to the floor owing to a defective suspension chain, destroying several desks and chairs and itself in the process. One person was injured, but fortunately, Congress was not in session. A committee investigating the incident exonerated Hooper of blame, and the chandelier ultimately was replaced with a gas model.

Other chandeliers of Hooper's are displayed in the library of the Longfellow House–Washington's Headquarters National Historic Site and are in the Metropolitan Museum of Art collections, while specimens of his Rococo Revival candelabras, Argand lamps, and candlesticks survive in private collections. Replicas of his solar chandeliers have recently been commissioned.

Hooper was also well known for his highly prized bells and chimes dating from 1838. His many clients included the City of San Francisco fire department and the Monhegan, ME, lighthouse, whose bell, now on display at the Monhegan Museum, became the subject of the Jamie Wyeth painting, “Bronze Age”.

His Boston foundry yard, the scene of construction of the chime for Christ Church in Cambridge, MA, was featured in a sketch by Winslow Homer for Harper's Weekly in 1860. Today, his bells are still found in churches, courthouses, and universities, mainly in New England. Notable examples include:

- The United Methodist Church of Savage, MD (1838)
- Wananalua Congregational Church, Maui, HI (1842)
- Pinewood Lutheran Church, Burlington, MA (1846)
- Town Hall Bell Tower, Plymouth, NH (1849)
- Restoration Community Church, 211 Main St., Kingston, MA (1852)
- Nashua Baptist Church, Nashua, NH (1854)
- First Church in Jamaica Plain, 6 Eliot St., Jamaica Plain, MA (1854) still rung daily
- San Joaquin County Courthouse, Stockton, CA (1855) (On display at The Haggin Museum, Stockton, CA)
- First Congregational Church, 115 So. Main St., Wolfeboro, NH (1856)
- The Boston Manufacturing Co. (On display at the Charles River Museum of Industry), Waltham, MA (1858)
- Issaquena County Courthouse, Issaquena County, 129 Court Street, Mayersville, MS (1858)
- Andy's Summer Playhouse, Wilton, NH (1860)
- Arlington Street Church, Boston, MA (1860)
- Christ Church, Cambridge, MA (1860)
- First Baptist Church, Yarmouth, ME (1860)
- Grace Church, Providence, RI (1861)
- New England Masonic Charitable Institute, Effingham, NH (1863)
- Private Residence, 2 Mill St., Sangerville, ME (1867)
- Episcopal Church of Our Saviour, Longwood Brookline, Massachusetts (1868)
- First Church, Charlestown (Boston), MA (1868)
- Stearns Steeple, Amherst College, Amherst, MA (1871)

•Popham Beach Chapel, Phippsburg, ME

- Usen Castle bell at Brandeis University
- Hebron Academy, Hebron, ME
- Woburn Firehouse #2, Woburn, MA
- Salem University, Salem West Virginia (1850)(a gift from the Old Mystic Church in CT)
- First Parish Church Kingston / Unitarian Universalist, Kingston, MA
- Mayflower Congregational Church, Kingston, MA
- The First Church in Belmont Unitarian Universalist, Belmont, MA (1857) (Rings daily)

William Blake, Hooper’s partner, continued to operate the foundry starting in 1868, supplying bells to churches in New England, to Amherst College, and to New York’s City Hall.

Hooper's company was one of 5 contracted by the Union Army to produce the Napoleon, a 6 ft., 1200 lb bronze field gun that was the most popular smoothbore artillery in the Civil War. Hooper's firm was the second leading supplier of the Revere Copper Company, supplying about one-third of the 1,156 Napoleons made for the North. Over 100 of Hooper’s guns survive, with some on display at Gettysburg, Arlington National Cemetery, and in the Rhode Island State House.

He cast the first life-sized bronze statue in the U.S., of Nathaniel Bowditch, the “father of modern maritime navigation” which was placed at Mount Auburn Cemetery, Cambridge, MA. The casting was later replaced in 1886.

Hooper was active in Boston politics, serving on the Boston Common Council in 1841, and as a Representative to the General Court. He was president of the Massachusetts Charitable Mechanic Association, a position previously held by Paul Revere.

He married Priscilla Langdon Harris of Boston in 1826. Hooper’s sons, Henry Northey and Isaac Harris Hooper, both served as officers in the Civil War. His brother, William Northey Hooper, was a merchant and a principal founder of the sugar industry in Hawaii. Hooper died in Roxbury, MA, in 1865.
