= John G. Floyd =

American politician

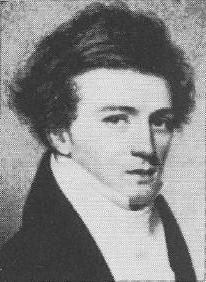

Member of the U.S. House of Representatives from New York
- In office March 4, 1851 – March 3, 1853
- Preceded by: John A. King
- Succeeded by: James Maurice
- Constituency: 1st district
- In office March 4, 1839 – March 3, 1843
- Preceded by: Abraham P. Grant
- Succeeded by: Charles S. Benton
- Constituency: 17th district

Personal details
- Born: John Gelston Floyd; February 5, 1806 Mastic, New York
- Died: October 5, 1881 (aged 75) Mastic, New York
- Party: Democratic (1839–56); Republican (1856–81)
- Spouse: Sarah Backus Kirkland

John Gelston Floyd (February 5, 1806 – October 5, 1881) was an American lawyer and politician who served three terms as a U.S. representative from New York from 1839 to 1853, and from 1851 to 1853. He was a grandson of William Floyd.

== Life and career ==
Floyd was born in Mastic near Moriches, Long Island, New York, the son of Phoebe (Gelston) and Nicoll Floyd. Floyd attended the common schools, and graduated from Hamilton College, Clinton, New York, in 1824. He studied law, was admitted to the bar in 1825, and commenced practice in Utica, New York.

=== Early career ===
He served as clerk and prosecuting attorney of Utica, New York from 1829 to 1833. He founded the Utica Democrat (later the Observer-Dispatch) in 1836. He was appointed judge of Suffolk County.

=== Congress ===
Floyd was elected as a Democrat to the Twenty-sixth and Twenty-seventh Congresses (March 4, 1839 – March 3, 1843). He returned to Mastic, Long Island, about 1842. He was a member of the New York State Senate (1st D.) in 1848 and 1849.

Floyd was elected to the Thirty-second Congress (March 4, 1851 – March 3, 1853). He served as chairman of the Committee on Agriculture (Thirty-second Congress).

=== Later career and death ===
He joined the Republican Party upon its formation in 1856. He retired from public life.

He died in Mastic, Long Island, New York on October 5, 1881. He was interred in the family cemetery.

=== Family ===
John G. Floyd is a great-great-grandfather of Republican Governor, and 2020 presidential candidate Bill Weld.

U.S. House of Representatives
| Preceded by Henry A. Foster, Abraham P. Grant | Member of the U.S. House of Representatives from New York's 17th congressional district 1839–1843 with David P. Brewster | Succeeded by Charles S. Benton |
New York State Senate
| Preceded by new district | New York State Senate; 1st District; 1848–1849 | Succeeded by William Horace Brown |
U.S. House of Representatives
| Preceded by John Alsop King | Member of the U.S. House of Representatives from New York's 1st congressional district 1851–1853 | Succeeded by James Maurice |
