= Riverside Cemetery (Oswego, New York) =

Historic cemetery in New York, United States

- U.S. National Register of Historic Places
- U.S. Historic district
- Location within New York Location within the United States
- Nearest city: Oswego, New York
- Coordinates: 43°25′24″N 76°28′34″W
- Area: 110 acres (45 ha)
- Built: 1855
- Architects: Thomas, Burton Arnold
- NRHP reference No.: 93000854
- Added to NRHP: August 19, 1993

Riverside Cemetery is a historic rural cemetery and national historic district located at Oswego in Oswego County, New York. It was established in 1855 and designed by landscape architect Burton Arnold Thomas (1808–1880). Within the boundaries of this contributing site are six contributing buildings, 12 contributing structures, and 18 contributing objects. Notable burials include De Witt Clinton Littlejohn (1818–1892), Luther W. Mott (1874–1923), Newton W. Nutting (1840–1889), Joel Turrill (1794–1859), David P. Brewster (1801–1876), Rudolph Bunner (1779–1837), James Cochran (1769–1848), John C. Churchill (1821–1905), Leander Babcock (1811–1864), Abraham P. Grant (1804–1871), and Orville Robinson (1801–1882).

It was listed on the National Register of Historic Places in 1993.
