= House Island (Massachusetts) =

Island in Essex County, Massachusetts, United States

- Interactive map of House Island

Geography
- Location: Massachusetts Bay outside Manchester Harbor
- Coordinates: 42°33′10″N 70°46′53″W
- Length: 2.2 mi (3.5 km)
- Highest elevation: 20 ft (6 m)

Administration
- United States
- State: Massachusetts
- County: Essex
- Town: Manchester-by-the-Sea

Demographics
- Population: 0

House Island is a small island on the outskirts of Manchester Harbor in Manchester-by-the-Sea, Massachusetts, United States.

House Island is uninhabited; sources of the name are unconfirmed. The island has steep rocky sides and dense vegetation away inland from the steep cliffs that surround it. The island is covered in poison ivy and is not recommended for visitation. The steep cliffs of the island allow passing ships and lobstermen to come within as little as 20 feet (6.1 m) of the shoreline without running aground.
