= Alexander G. Abell =

American diplomat and writer (1818–1890)

Honorable Alexander G. Abell

United States Ambassador to Hawaii
- In office 1845–1846
- President: John Tyler
- Preceded by: Peter A. Brinsmade
- Succeeded by: Joel Turrill

Personal details
- Born: Alexander Gurdon Abell; June 29, 1818 New York City, US
- Died: December 28, 1890 (aged 72) San Francisco, California, US

Alexander Gurdon Abell, often mistakenly misspelled Gordon, (June 29, 1818 – December 28, 1890) was an American diplomat, writer, and freemason.

== Biography ==
Abell was born on June 29, 1818, to Gurdon and Anna Abell in New York City. Despite being born elsewhere, his parents would raise him in their town of residence, Franklin, Connecticut. In 1820 the family would move to Augusta, Georgia where his father would become a cotton dealer and slaveholder; following the move Abell would find himself in New Haven in 1826 when he was sent there for schooling.

In 1843 Abell, then working as a journalist, had a biography of U.S. President John Tyler, titled Life of John Tyler, published by Harper and Brothers. He had written it at the behest of the president, who commissioned it to increase his chances at reelection. Once published Tyler had appointed his son to conduct a campaign of coercing postmasters into purchasing and distributing the biography on the President's behalf.

Abell would be rewarded by the president with a political appointment for his work on the biography and delivering dispatches to Sam Houston in the early 1840s. Originally he was nominated to serve as Consul in Marseilles, but the Senate rejected him; despite draw backs President Tyler made sure to reward Abell. Instead of going to France, he was appointed as the United States Consul to Hawaii on January 16, 1845. He would serve for less than ten months, leaving in 1846. During this period he would act as editor of the Sandwich Island News.

Abell moved to California in November 1847, while there he would become a prominent citizen of the state. With the help of Charles H. Cragin, the two would establish the Sacramento Hospital in Sutter's Fort in 1849; this would be the first hospital in what would become Sacramento, California. Later on, from 1857 to 1860 he served as president of the Society of California Pioneers. He also served as Grand Secretary of the Grand Lodge of Free and Accepted Masons of California from 1855 to 1890, and was also a grand commander of the California Knights Templar for eight years. He would also serve as a California State Senator.

He died in San Francisco, California at his residence, on December 28, 1890.
