= Joel Turrill =

American politician (1794–1859)

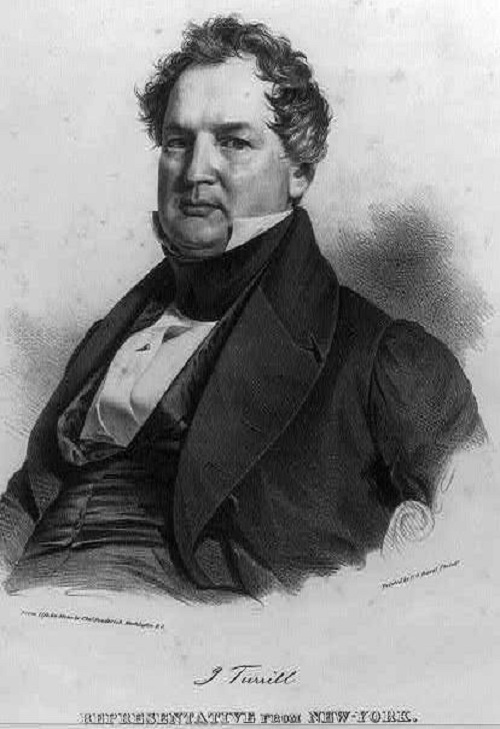

Member of the U.S. House of Representatives from New York's 17th district
- In office March 4, 1833 – March 3, 1837
- Preceded by: Frederick Whittlesey
- Succeeded by: Abraham P. Grant

Personal details
- Born: February 22, 1794 Shoreham, Vermont, U.S.
- Died: December 28, 1859 (aged 65) Oswego, New York, U.S.
- Resting place: Riverside Cemetery

Joel Turrill (February 22, 1794 – December 28, 1859) was a judge, politician, and diplomat from New York. From 1833 to 1837, he served two terms in the U.S. House of Representatives.

== Life ==
Turrill was born February 22, 1794, in Shoreham, Vermont, and attended the common school. He graduated from Middlebury College in 1816. He studied law in Newburgh, New York and later moved to Oswego, New York, to practice after being admitted to the bar in 1819. He served as Justice of the Peace, County judge 1828-1833, and member of the State assembly in 1831.

Turrill was elected as a Jacksonian to the Twenty-third and Twenty-fourth Congresses in the House of Representatives from March 4, 1833, to March 3, 1837. He was not a candidate for reelection in 1836. He served as district attorney for Oswego County 1838-1840, and surrogate of Oswego County in 1843. He was appointed United States consul to the Kingdom of Hawaii 1845-1850. He died in Oswego, New York on December 28, 1859 and was interred in Riverside Cemetery.

== Personal life ==
Turrill married Mary Sullivan Hubbard on Dec. 21, 1830 in Champion, New York. They had four children: William, Elizabeth Douglas, Mary Hubbard and Frederick. The older daughter, Elizabeth Douglas (Turrill) Van Denburgh, wrote an account of the family's voyage in 1845 and 1846 to the "Sandwich Islands" when her father was appointed U.S. Consul-General to the Kingdom of Hawaii.

U.S. House of Representatives
Preceded by David P. Brewster	Member of the U.S. House of Representatives from New York's 17th congressional district 1833–1837	Succeeded by Abraham P. Grant
Diplomatic posts
Preceded by Alexander G. Abell	U.S. Consul to Kingdom of Hawaii; 1846–1850	Succeeded by Elisha Hunt Allen
