= Rutger B. Miller =

American politician (1805–1877)

Rutger Bleecker Miller

Member of the United States House of Representatives from New York's 17th congressional district
- In office November 9, 1836 – March 3, 1837
- Preceded by: Samuel Beardsley
- Succeeded by: Henry A. Foster

Personal details
- Born: July 28, 1805 Lowville, New York, U.S.
- Died: November 12, 1877 (aged 72) Utica, New York, U.S.
- Resting place: Forest Hill Cemetery; Utica, New York, U.S.
- Party: Jacksonian; Democratic
- Spouse: Mary Forman Miller
- Children: 6
- Parent(s): Morris Smith Miller; Maria (Bleecker) Miller
- Education: Litchfield Law School
- Profession: Attorney; businessman; politician

Rutger Bleecker Miller (July 28, 1805 – November 12, 1877) was a United States representative from New York. His father was Morris Smith Miller, also a U.S. representative from New York.

== Early life ==
Rutger Bleecker Miller was born on July 28, 1805, in Lowville to Morris Smith Miller. Miller attended the common schools in Utica, the Catholic College in Montreal, Quebec, Canada and Yale College. He graduated from the Litchfield Law School in 1824 and was admitted to the bar, practicing in Utica from 1829 to 1831. He was manager of the Utica Wilberforce Society 1829 and was interested in banking and railroads in 1832 and 1833.

== Career ==
Miller was a trustee of the village of Utica from 1829 to 1831; served as member of the first board of aldermen of the city of Utica; was a member of the New York State Assembly in 1832; and was clerk of the United States district court in 1833 and 1834.

=== Congress ===
Miller was elected as a Jacksonian to the Twenty-fourth Congress to fill the vacancy caused by the resignation of Samuel Beardsley and served from November 9, 1836, to March 3, 1837.

=== Later career and death ===
He engaged in building and railroad construction, and subsequently in the management of his farm in Boonville in Oneida County.

Miller died on November 12, 1877, in Utica. He was interred in Forest Hill Cemetery there.

== Sources ==
- United States Congress. "Rutger B. Miller (id: M000751)". Biographical Directory of the United States Congress.

U.S. House of Representatives
Preceded by Samuel Beardsley	Member of the U.S. House of Representatives from New York's 17th congressional district 1836-1837	Succeeded by Henry A. Foster
