= Old Sugar Mill of Koloa =

Sugarcane plantation in Hawaiʻi, U.S.

- Old Sugar Mill of Kōloa
- U.S. National Register of Historic Places
- U.S. National Historic Landmark
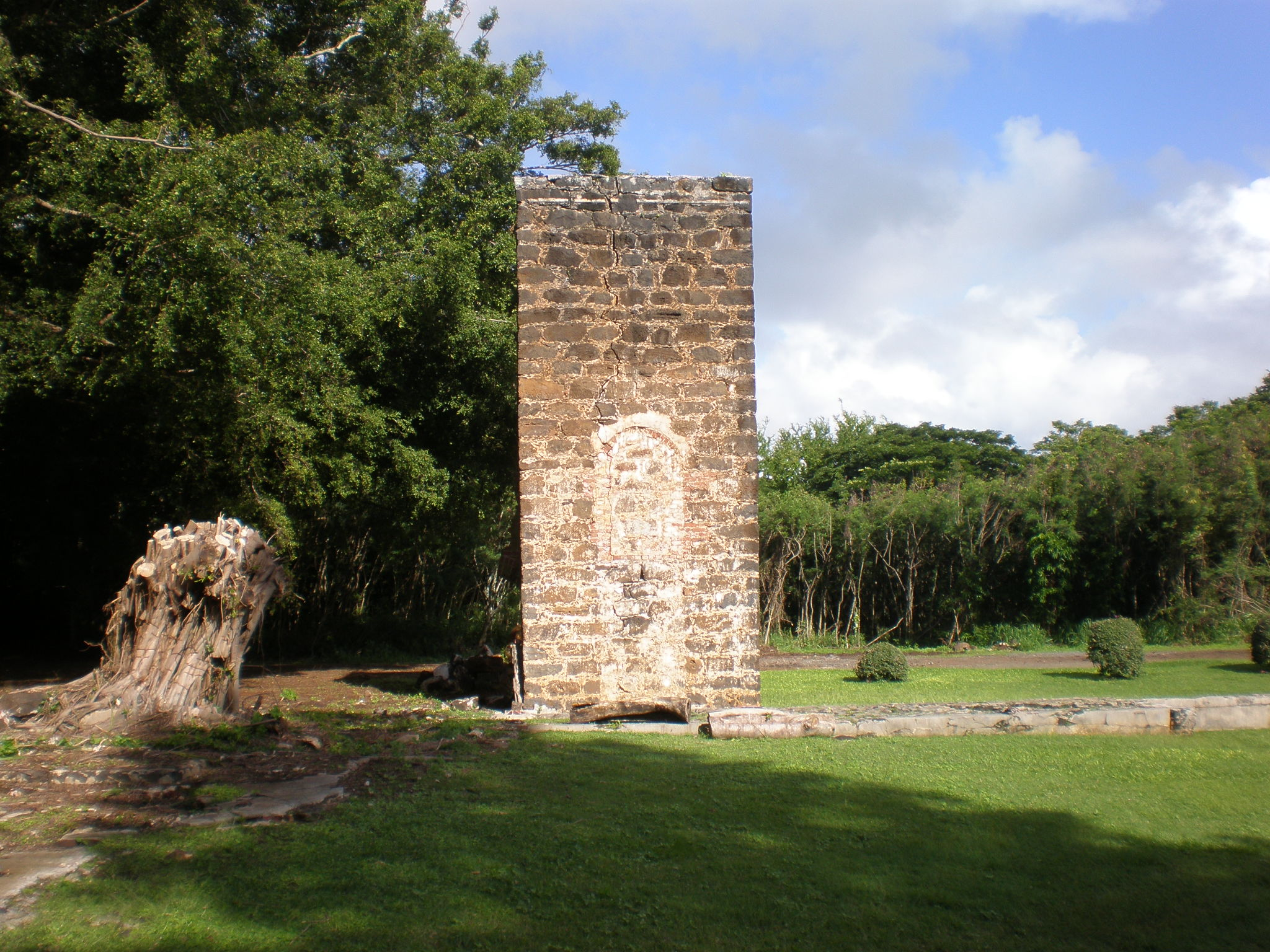
- Brick chimney of Old Sugar Mill

- Location within Hawaii
- Location: Maluhia and Kōloa Roads, Kōloa
- Coordinates: 21°54′35″N 159°28′9″W
- Built: 1839–1841
- NRHP reference No.: 66000296

Significant dates
- Added to NRHP: October 15, 1966
- Designated NHL: December 29, 1962

The Old Sugar Mill of Kōloa was part of the first commercially successful sugarcane plantation in Hawaiʻi, which was founded in Kōloa on the island of Kauaʻi in 1835 by Ladd & Company. This was the beginning of what would become Hawaii's largest industry. The building was designated a National Historic Landmark on December 29, 1962. A stone chimney and foundations remain from 1840.

== History ==
Although sugarcane had been raised by ancient Hawaiians on small personal plots, this was the first large-scale commercial production in Hawaii. Joseph Goodrich of the Hilo mission and Samuel Ruggles of the Kona Mission had experimented with using agriculture to support their missions as well as give employment to their students. After trying unsuccessfully to get Rev. Goodrich, Hooper moved to the land as manager, despite having no training in engineering nor agriculture.

The plantation was established here due to the overall fertility of the soil, proximity to a good port, and location near the Maulili pool which allowed them the use of a waterfall for processing power. This first lease was not easily acquired and connections to missionaries played a large part in its acquisition. Previously molasses would end up being distilled into rum, which the conservative missionaries were constantly battling. The founders of Ladd & Co. were William Ladd (1807–1863), Peter A. Brinsmade (1804–1859), and William Northey Hooper (1809–1878). Hawaiians resisted the lease of the land and initially forbade the sale of provisions to plantation managers. The two groups eventually struck an uneasy partnership that resulted in multiple conflicts as time progressed.

Although 980 acres (400 ha) were leased from King Kamehameha III, only 12 acres (4.9 ha) were planted in September 1835. A small mill powered by water from Maulili pool produced a small amount of molasses in 1836. The wooden rollers in the mill quickly wore out, so were replaced with iron ones for increased production. By 1837, the mill produced over 4,000 pounds (1,800 kg) of sugar and 700 US gallons (2,600 L) of molasses. A subsequent mill, whose chimney and foundation are still visible, was built from 1839 to 1841 on Waihohonu Stream. It cost close to US$16,000 to build.

== Labor disputes ==
Managers of the sugarcane plantation expressed significant frustration with the Hawaiian laborers suggesting they have shown "complete worthlessness ... as laborers". The Hawaiian people are described as being so strongly rooted in their cultural heritage that "centuries, at least, will intervene ere they will understand that it is a part of their duty to serve their masters faithfully". The plantation manager goes on to state that the work of 10 white men was equivalent to that of 400 Hawaiians.

Plantation owners paid workers $2 per month using "Kauai Currency" which could only be redeemed at plantation stores for goods (marked up no more than 2% over market). They were provided furnished houses but had to pay 1 cent per day for them. In an 1841 revolt against these conditions, Hawaiian workers commenced an unsuccessful strike for higher wages. A review of Kōloa history and working conditions reveals the motivations of plantation owners to import labor resulting in a massive wave of globalization for the islands.

Kōloa plantation used a contract system that gave laborers an interest in the crop, but prevented them from finding other employment without penalties. These methods were later adopted by other planters in the Territory of Hawaii that became known as the "Big Five".

== Demise ==
Ladd & Co. shut down in 1844 after a failed attempt to colonize the rest of the Hawaiian Islands. The Kōloa plantation was repossessed by the Hawaiian government and sold to Dr. Robert Wood, Hooper's brother-in-law, who ran it until 1874. In 1853 a steam engine was used to power a mill for the first time in Hawaii. Samuel Burbank developed a deep plow to increase production.

Koloa Agricultural Company was purchased by the Duncan McBryde family in 1899, who added it to their estate and the Eleʻele Plantation. Their agent was Theo H. Davies & Co. In 1910 Alexander & Baldwin became the agent, and would eventually buy out the other partners. The old mill was replaced by a much larger one to the east in 1912, which was acquired from the planned American Sugar Company plantation on Molokaʻi. Frank A. Alexander managed the company from 1912 to 1937. Cedric B. Baldwin managed the company from 1938 until World War II, when he was killed on Iwo Jima. McBryde merged with the Grove Farm Company in 1948. The plantation was shut down in 1996. In 2000 Grove Farm was sold to Steve Case, whose grandfather A. Hebard Case had worked on the plantation. He paid US$25 million and assumed $60 million of debt, but was sued by other shareholders since his father had served as lawyer for the company. The lawsuit went to court but was dismissed in 2008.

== Gallery ==
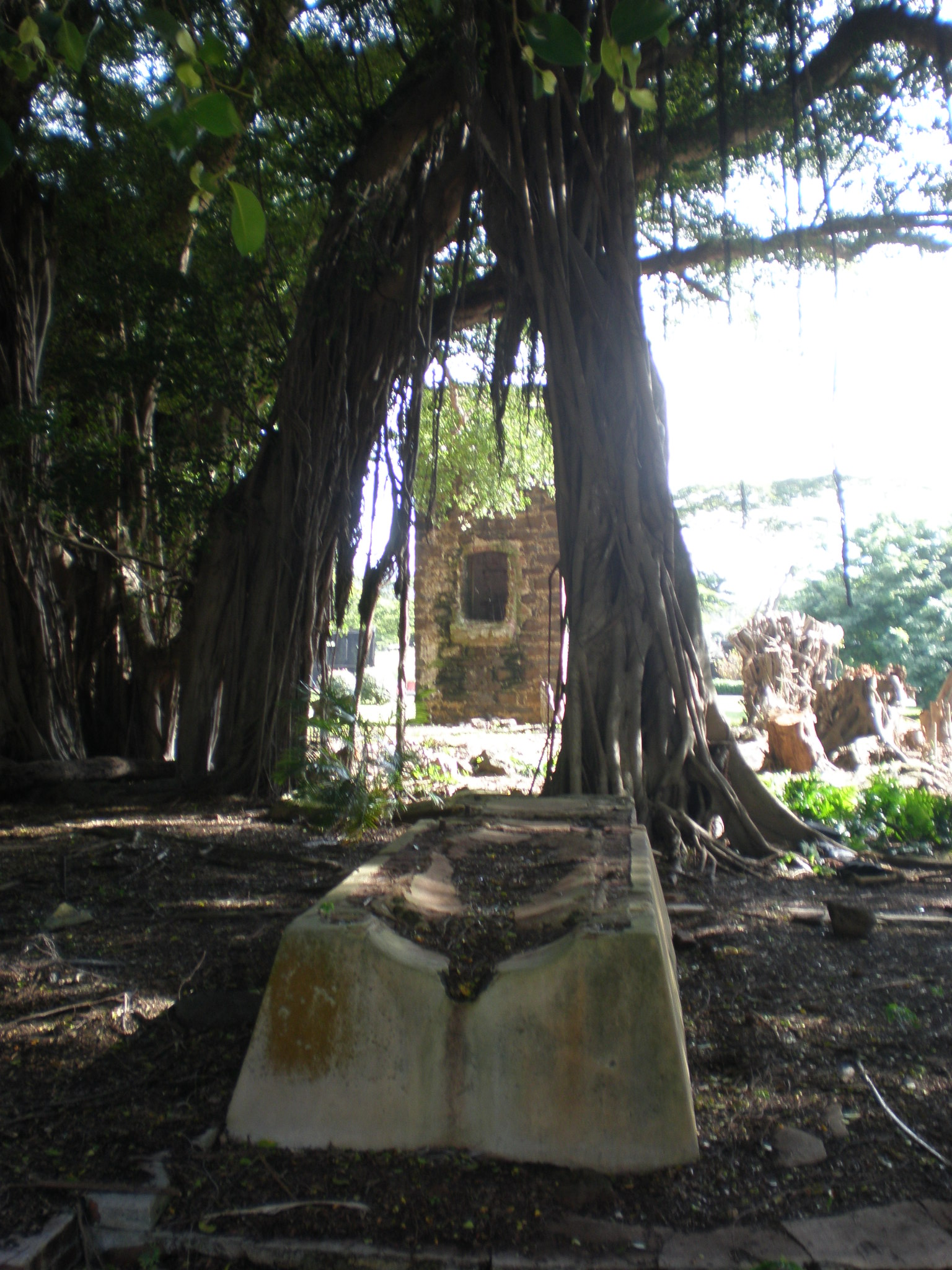
Old mill trough, chimney, and overgrowth

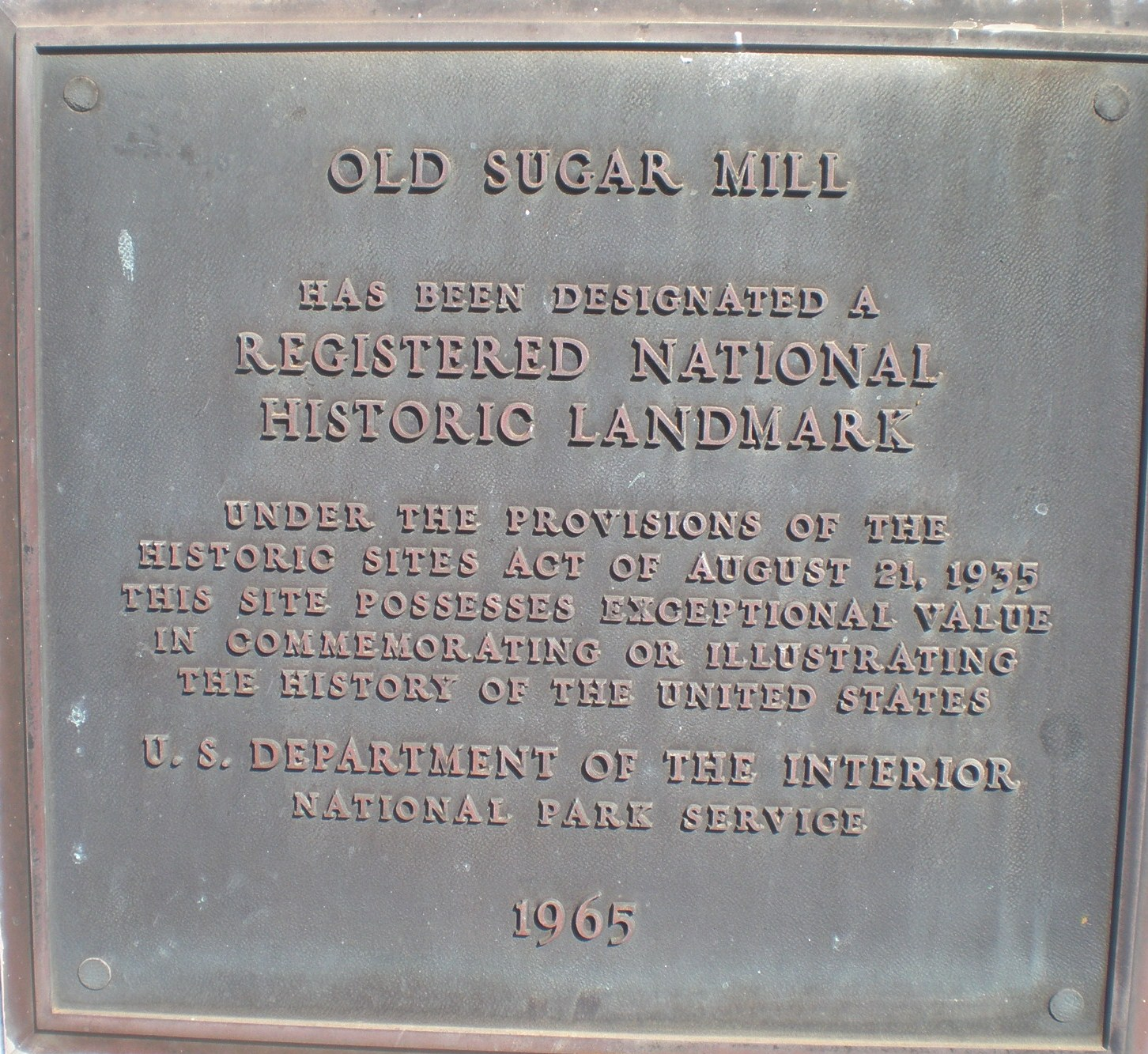
National Historic Landmark plaque, 1965

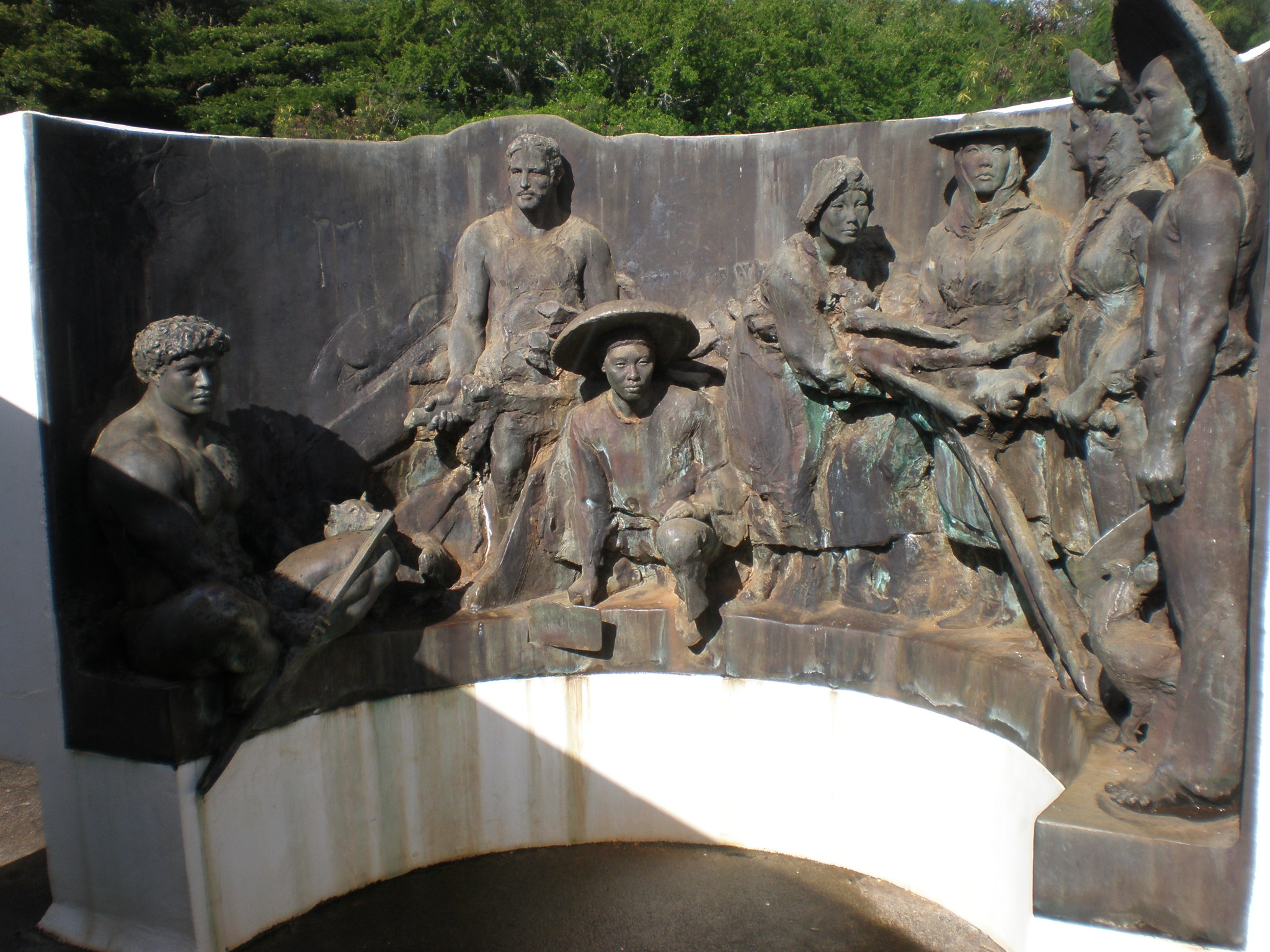
Bronze sculpture by Jan Gordon Fisher

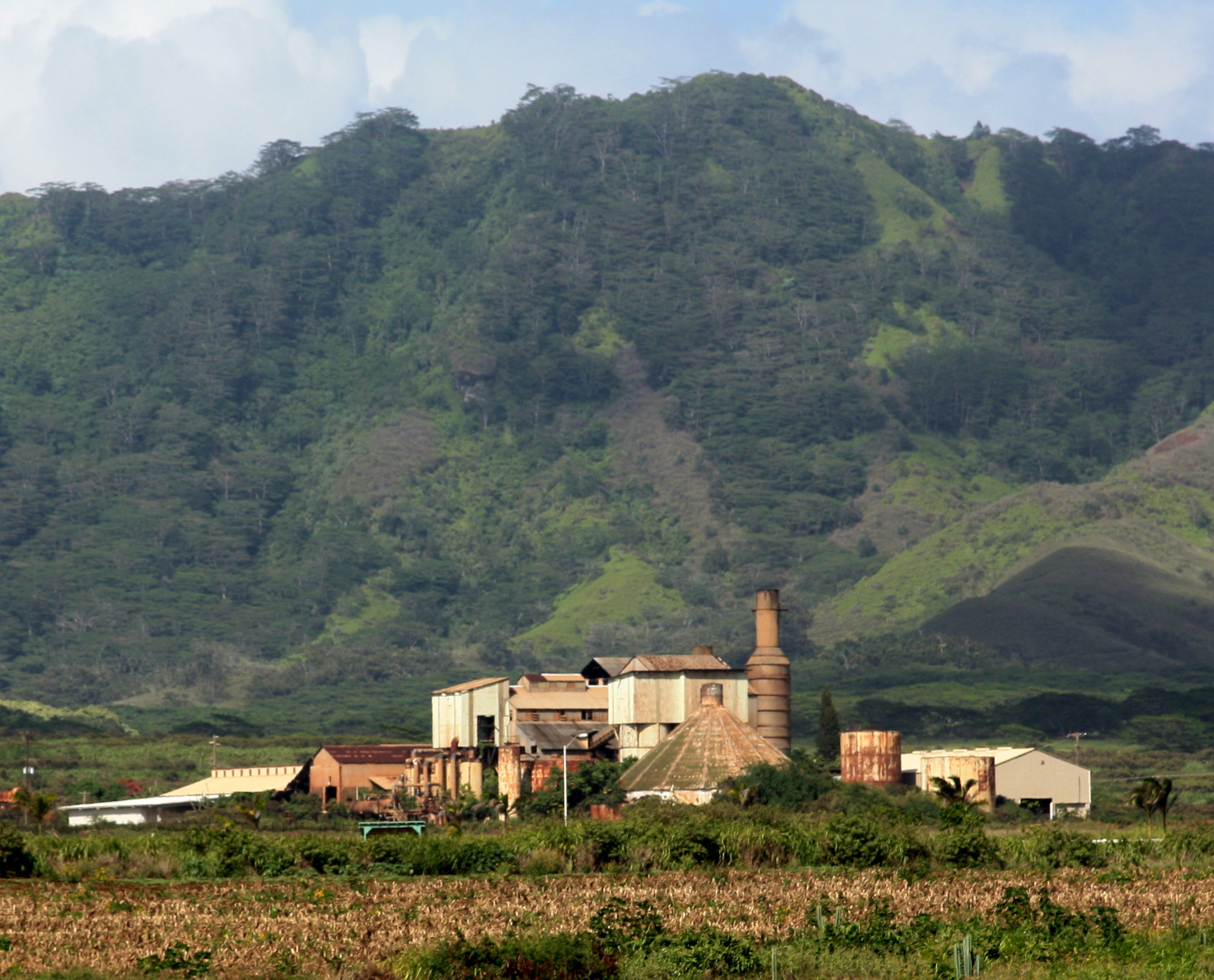
Later Kōloa Sugar Mill, now derelict
