= Manchester-by-the-Sea, Massachusetts =

Town in Massachusetts

Manchester-by-the-Sea
- Town
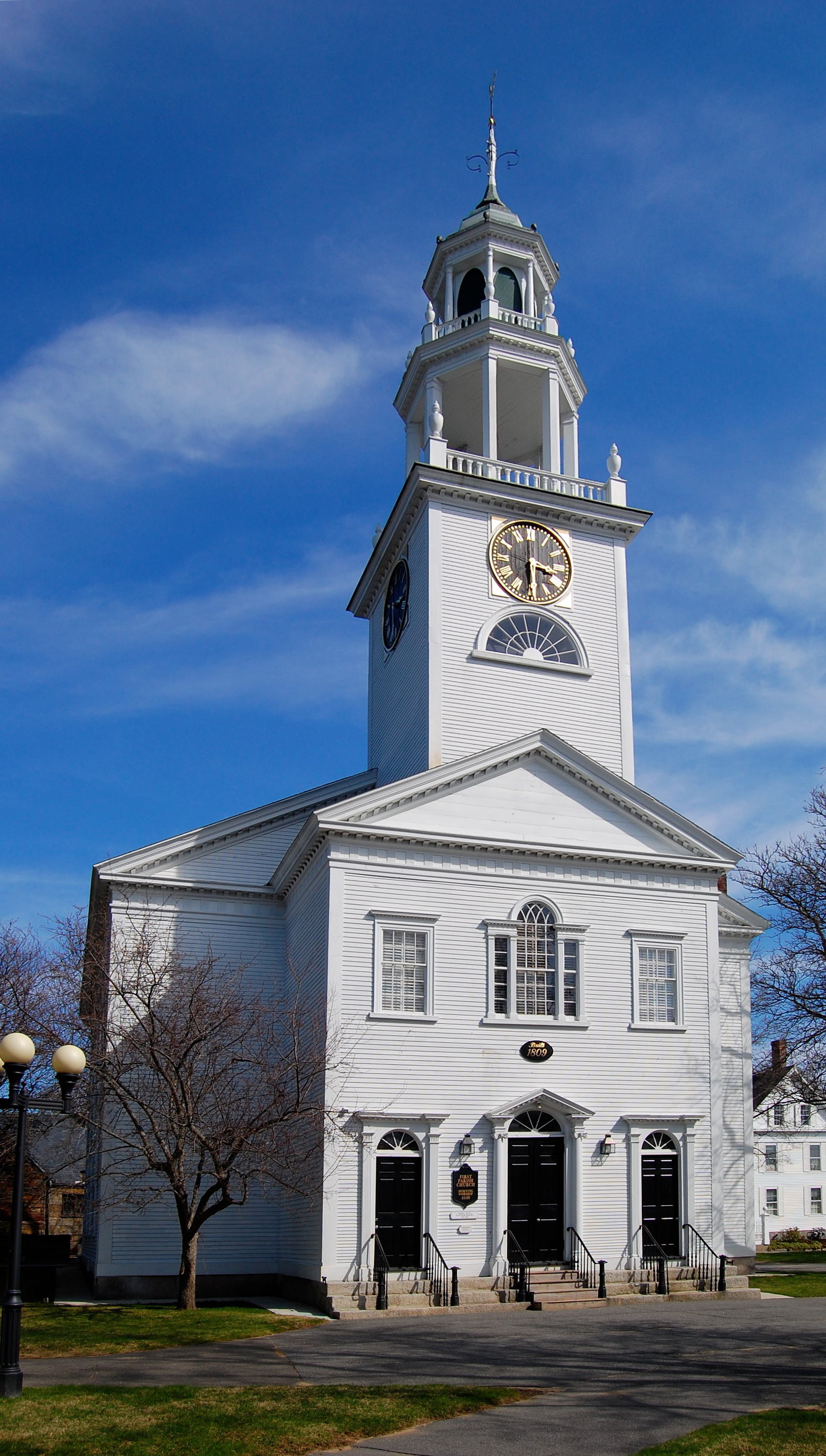
- The First Parish Church in central Manchester-by-the-Sea

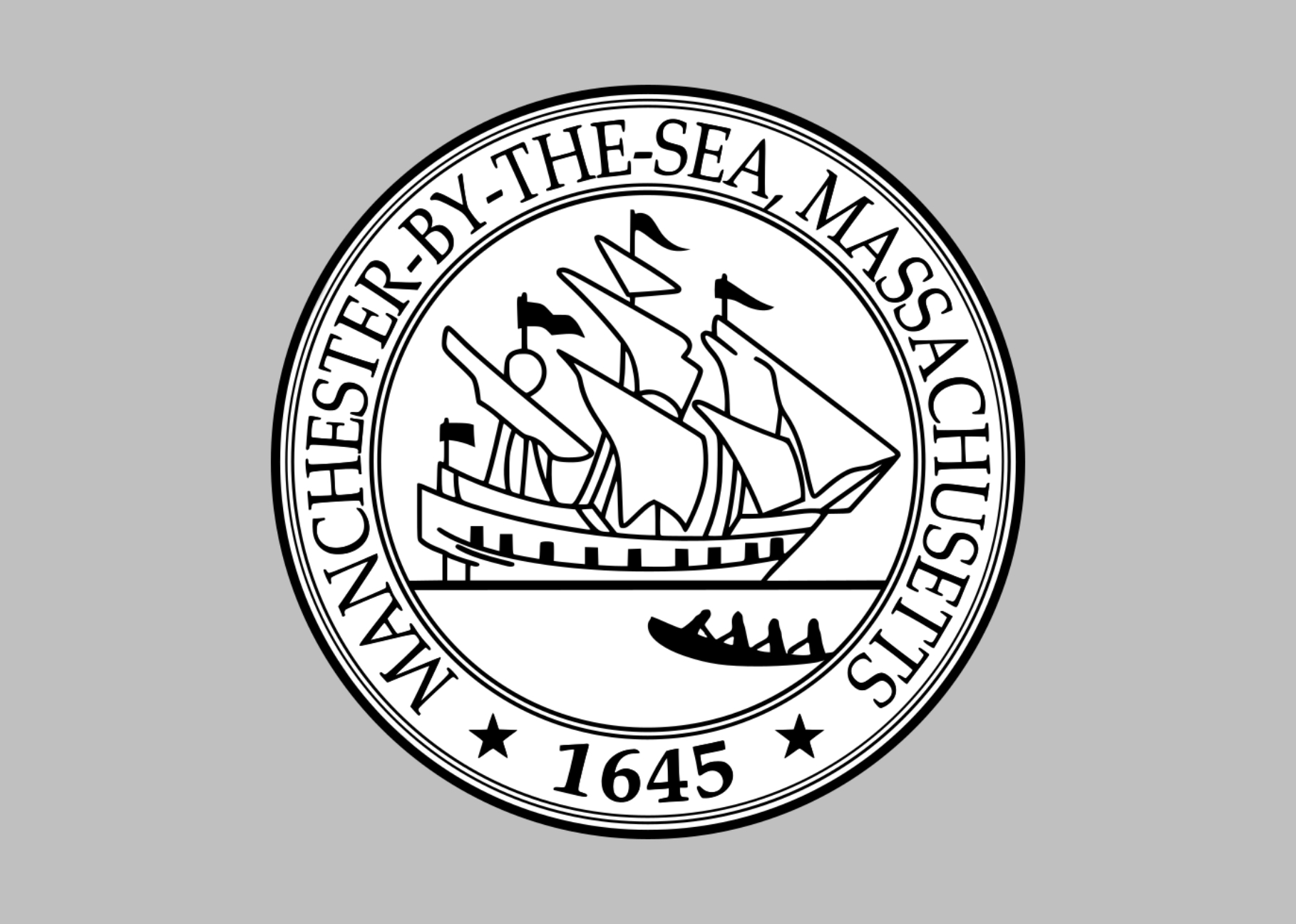
- Flag Seal

- Location in Essex County and Massachusetts
- Coordinates: 42°34′40″N 70°46′10″W
- Country: United States
- State: Massachusetts
- County: Essex
- Settled: 1629
- Incorporated: 1645

Government
  - Type: Open town meeting

Area
  - Total: 18.3 sq mi (47.3 km^{2})
  - Land: 9.2 sq mi (23.9 km^{2})
  - Water: 9.0 sq mi (23.4 km^{2})
- Elevation: 30 ft (9 m)

Population (2020)
  - Total: 5,395
  - Density: 585/sq mi (226/km^{2})
- Time zone: UTC–5 (Eastern)
  - Summer (DST): UTC–4 (Eastern)
- ZIP code: 01944
- Area code: 351 / 978
- FIPS code: 25-37995
- GNIS feature ID: 0619451
- Website: manchester.ma.us

Manchester-by-the-Sea (also known simply as Manchester, its name prior to 1990) is a coastal town on Cape Ann, in Essex County, Massachusetts, United States. The town is known for scenic beaches and vista points. According to the 2020 population census, the population is 5,395.

The town lies on the southern side of Cape Ann, at the point where the peninsula meets the mainland. The North Shore was populated by the Agawam people prior to European settlement, which began in 1629, about a decade after an epidemic killed much of the native people. Fishing was the major industry in the town almost from its incorporation in 1645, but in the mid-19th century it began to grow as a popular seaside resort community. The town has appeared, either by name or as a filming location, in a number of films and TV shows, notably the eponymous 2016 film Manchester by the Sea.

== History ==
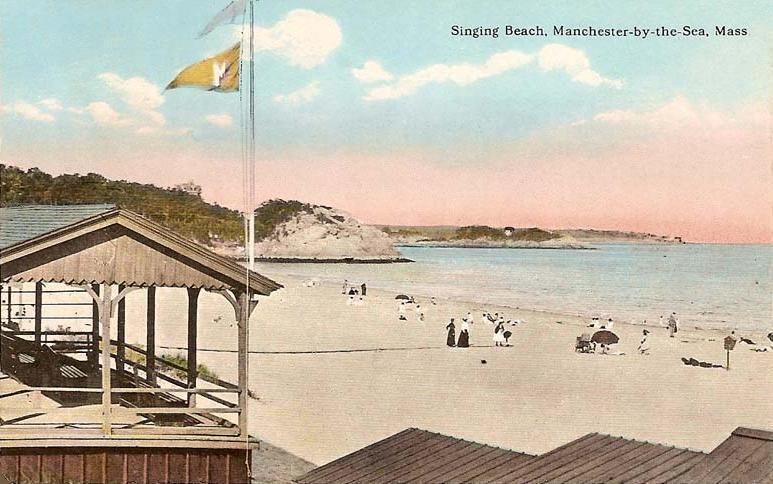
Singing Beach in 1914

The area that would become Manchester was inhabited by Agawam people at the time of contact in the early 1600s, who were decimated by virgin soil epidemics especially in 1617–1619, after which fewer than 50 indigenous individuals are estimated to have survived within the modern bounds of Manchester.

Manchester was first settled by English colonists in 1629 and was officially incorporated in 1645. It was formed from territory taken from Salem (that portion since given to Beverly) and Gloucester. In 1700, Manchester selectmen paid three grandchildren of Agawam sachem Masconomet three pounds and nineteen shillings for the rights to the land.

The community thrived primarily as a fishing community for more than 200 years. Beginning in 1845, it started to attract summer residents from the Boston area after poet Richard Dana built a house in the town. Over the next fifty years, development of summer houses along the coastline established the community as Boston society's community of choice for summer residency. The trend continued with designs of houses by architects, such as "Sunnywaters", designed by John Hubbard Sturgis for his older brother, Russell, in 1863.

The best known of these "summer cottages" was Kragsyde, completed in 1885. Commissioned by George Nixon Black, the Peabody and Stearns-designed residence has been hailed as the zenith of the Shingle style substyle of the Queen Anne style of architecture. It was demolished in 1929.

=== Name ===
To prevent confusion with the nearby and much larger city of Manchester, New Hampshire, the name of the town was officially changed in 1989 following in a town meeting vote that year; the decision was extremely close and passed only by a vote of 97 to 95. This was ratified by an act of the state legislature passed on September 25, 1989. "Manchester by the Sea" was a familiar alternative town name since it was first used in 1877 by Boston publisher James T. Fields while attending an annual summer picnic of the "Manchester Elder Brethren" that still takes place today. The name change was driven by Edward Corley, a longtime resident of Manchester.

== Geography ==
According to the United States Census Bureau, the town has a total area of 18.3 square miles (47.3 km^{2}), of which 9.2 square miles (23.9 km^{2}) is land and 9.0 square miles (23.4 km^{2}), or 49.47%, is water. The town lies along the North Shore of Massachusetts Bay, which in turn leads to the Atlantic Ocean. There are seven beaches lining the coast, and several small islands dot the coast, the largest being Kettle Island and House Island.

Several small coves edge the coast, the largest being Manchester Harbor, which is fed by Sawmill Brook and other small bodies of water. There are several protected areas within town, including Cedar Swamp Conservation Area, Cheever Commons Conservation Area, Coolidge Reservation, Dexter Pond, Owl's Nest Nature Preservation Land, Powder House Hill Reservation, and Wyman Hill Conservation Area.

Manchester-by-the-Sea is bordered by Beverly and Wenham to the west, Hamilton to the northwest, Essex to the north, and Gloucester to the east. The town is located 9 miles (14 km) northeast of Salem and 24 miles (39 km) northeast of Boston.

== Transportation ==
Manchester-by-the-Sea lies along Massachusetts Route 128, the inner of two beltways around Greater Boston. Route 128 has two exits within town as it passes from Beverly to Gloucester, with a small portion crossing through the corner of Essex. Route 127 also passes from west to east through town, traveling through the center of town. There is no bus service directly into town, with service passing east via the Cape Ann Transportation Authority in Gloucester, and an MBTA bus route providing service to Beverly.

The town is served by a stop along the Newburyport/Rockport Line of the MBTA Commuter Rail, providing service from Rockport along the North Shore to Boston's North Station. The nearest airport is the Beverly Municipal Airport, with the nearest national and international service at Boston's Logan International Airport.

== Demographics ==
Historical population
Year	Pop.	±%
1790	965	—
1800	1,082	+12.1%
1810	1,137	+5.1%
1820	1,201	+5.6%
1830	1,236	+2.9%
1840	1,355	+9.6%
1850	1,638	+20.9%
1860	1,698	+3.7%
1870	1,665	−1.9%
1880	1,640	−1.5%
1890	1,789	+9.1%
1900	2,522	+41.0%
1910	2,673	+6.0%
1920	2,466	−7.7%
1930	2,636	+6.9%
1940	2,472	−6.2%
1950	2,868	+16.0%
1960	3,932	+37.1%
1970	5,151	+31.0%
1980	5,424	+5.3%
1990	5,286	−2.5%
2000	5,228	−1.1%
2010	5,136	−1.8%
2020	5,395	+5.0%
2022*	5,354	−0.8%
* = population estimate. Source: United States census records and Population Estimates Program data.

As of the census of 2010, there were 5,136 people, 2,147 households, and 1,444 families residing in the town. The population density was 562.7 inhabitants per square mile (217.3/km^{2}). The racial makeup of the town was 97.6% White, (5,012); 0.9% Asian, (46); 0.2% Native American, (10); 0.1% African American, (5); 0.1% from other races, and 1.1% from two or more races. Hispanic or Latino of any race were 1.5% (77) of the population. The median income for a household in the town was $95,243, and the median income for a family was $109,760. About 4.5% of families and 5.1% of the population were below the poverty line, including 3.9% of those under age 18 and 3.7% of those age 65 or over.

== Government ==
Manchester-by-the-Sea presidential election results
Year	Democratic	Republican	Third parties	Total Votes	Margin
2024	70.82% 2,575	26.18% 952	3.00% 109	3,636	44.64%
2020	71.01% 2,712	26.55% 1,014	2.44% 93	3,819	44.46%
2016	64.81% 2,249	27.49% 954	7.69% 267	3,470	37.32%
2012	54.44% 1,926	44.06% 1,559	1.50% 53	3,538	10.37%
2008	60.14% 2,046	37.92% 1,290	1.94% 66	3,402	22.22%
2004	55.27% 1,825	43.22% 1,427	1.51% 50	3,302	12.05%
2000	46.32% 1,461	44.01% 1,388	9.67% 305	3,154	2.31%
1996	47.25% 1,419	42.86% 1,287	9.89% 297	3,003	4.40%
1992	39.81% 1,323	37.80% 1,256	22.39% 744	3,323	2.02%
1988	41.80% 1,382	56.32% 1,862	1.88% 62	3,306	14.52%
1984	38.27% 1,170	61.30% 1,874	0.43% 13	3,057	23.03%
1980	27.33% 856	48.98% 1,534	23.69% 742	3,132	21.65%
1976	37.64% 1,154	58.90% 1,806	3.46% 106	3,066	21.27%
1972	42.72% 1,215	56.96% 1,620	0.32% 9	2,844	14.24%
1968	42.46% 1,030	56.02% 1,359	1.53% 37	2,426	13.56%
1964	59.90% 1,292	39.31% 848	0.79% 17	2,157	20.58%
1960	32.03% 702	67.97% 1,490	0.00% 0	2,192	35.95%
1956	20.99% 416	78.66% 1,559	0.35% 7	1,982	57.67%
1952	24.50% 443	75.39% 1,363	0.11% 2	1,808	50.88%
1948	27.36% 417	71.92% 1,096	0.72% 11	1,524	44.55%
1944	31.29% 454	68.50% 994	0.21% 3	1,451	37.22%
1940	25.10% 376	74.70% 1,119	0.20% 3	1,498	49.60%

== Journalism ==
A local newspaper, The Manchester Cricket, has published weekly since 1888. The newspaper has been owned by just three families since it began. Within the Cricket, there is a special section dedicated to the neighboring town, Essex. This section is called The Essex Echo. The town is also served by a regional newspaper, the Gloucester Daily Times.

== Education ==
The community lies within the Manchester Essex Regional School District.

== Controversies ==
Howard Lewis, who had been appointed as a reserve police officer in 2008 and a full-time officer in 2010, had been assigned to the midnight to 8 a.m. shift and served as the department's primary firearms instructor, when he was placed on administrative leave amid an internal affairs investigation on December 15, 2018, according to Manchester-by-the-Sea Police Chief Edward Conley. An internal affairs investigation determined he stole a firearm from the police station and sold it to a pawn shop for $650.

In 2012, Manchester-by-the-Sea Police Department Sergeant John "Jay" Swallow was convicted of multiple crimes, including assaulting his wife and weapons charges. He engaged in a physical altercation while pointing a handgun at both his wife and the family dog.

== Points of interest ==
=== Singing Beach ===
One mile (1.6 km) from the town center is Singing Beach, so named because the sand comprising the beach squeaks when walked upon. The sand is an iridescent color when the sun sets. This beach is quite popular during summer months in particular, because it is easily accessible from Boston by a one-half-mile (800 m) walk from the MBTA train station. Also located on this beach is the tourist attraction "Eaglehead", a rock composite that is the focal point of rock climbing and other recreation activities.

=== Other points of interest ===
- The Monoliths, formerly known as Agassiz Rock
- Masconomo Park
- Coolidge Reservation
- Crow Island
- Kragsyde
- Smith's Point
- Manchester Historical Museum (Trask House)
- Tucks Point
- Cathedral Pines
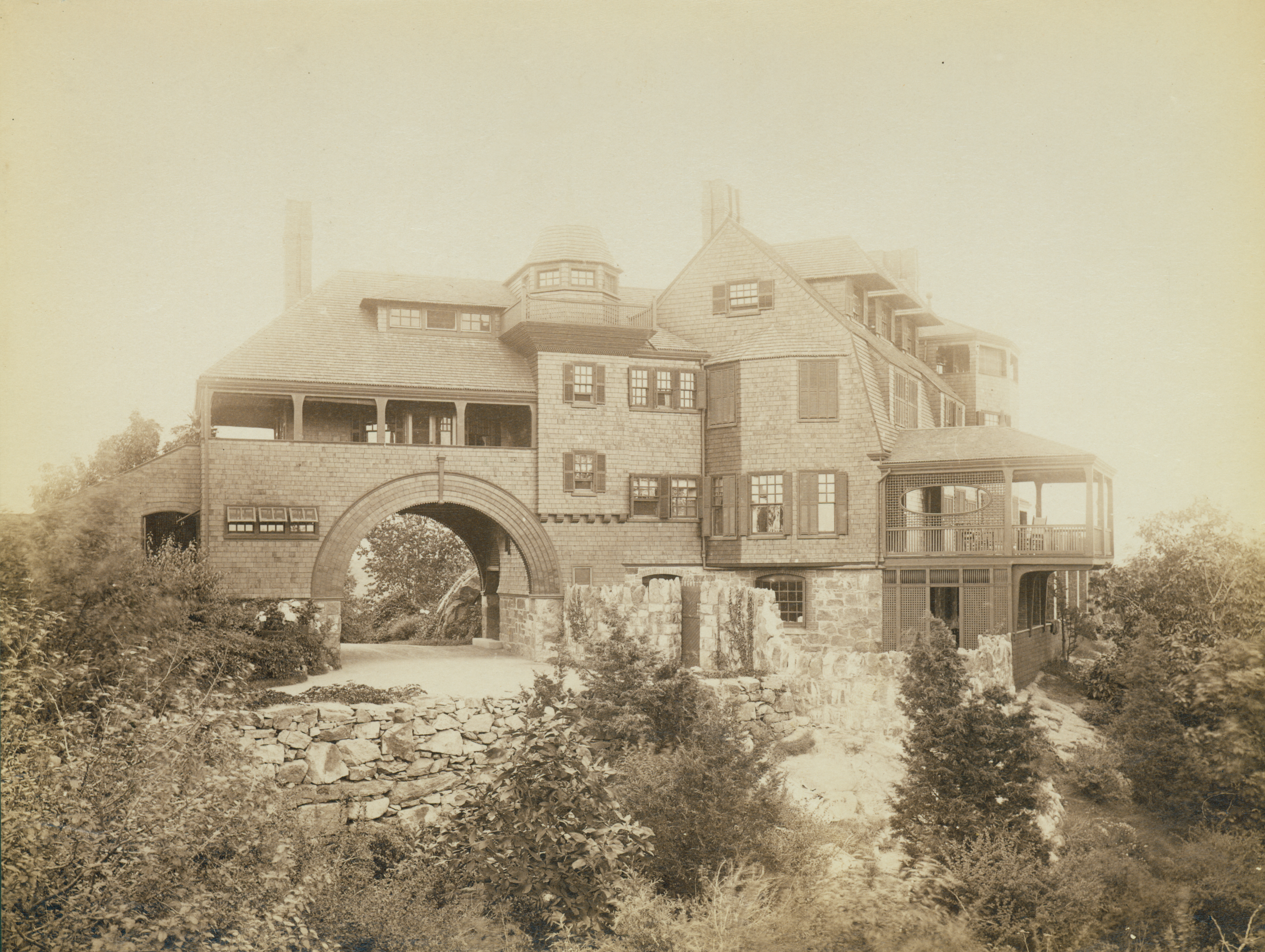
Kragsyde Mansion (1885, demolished 1929)

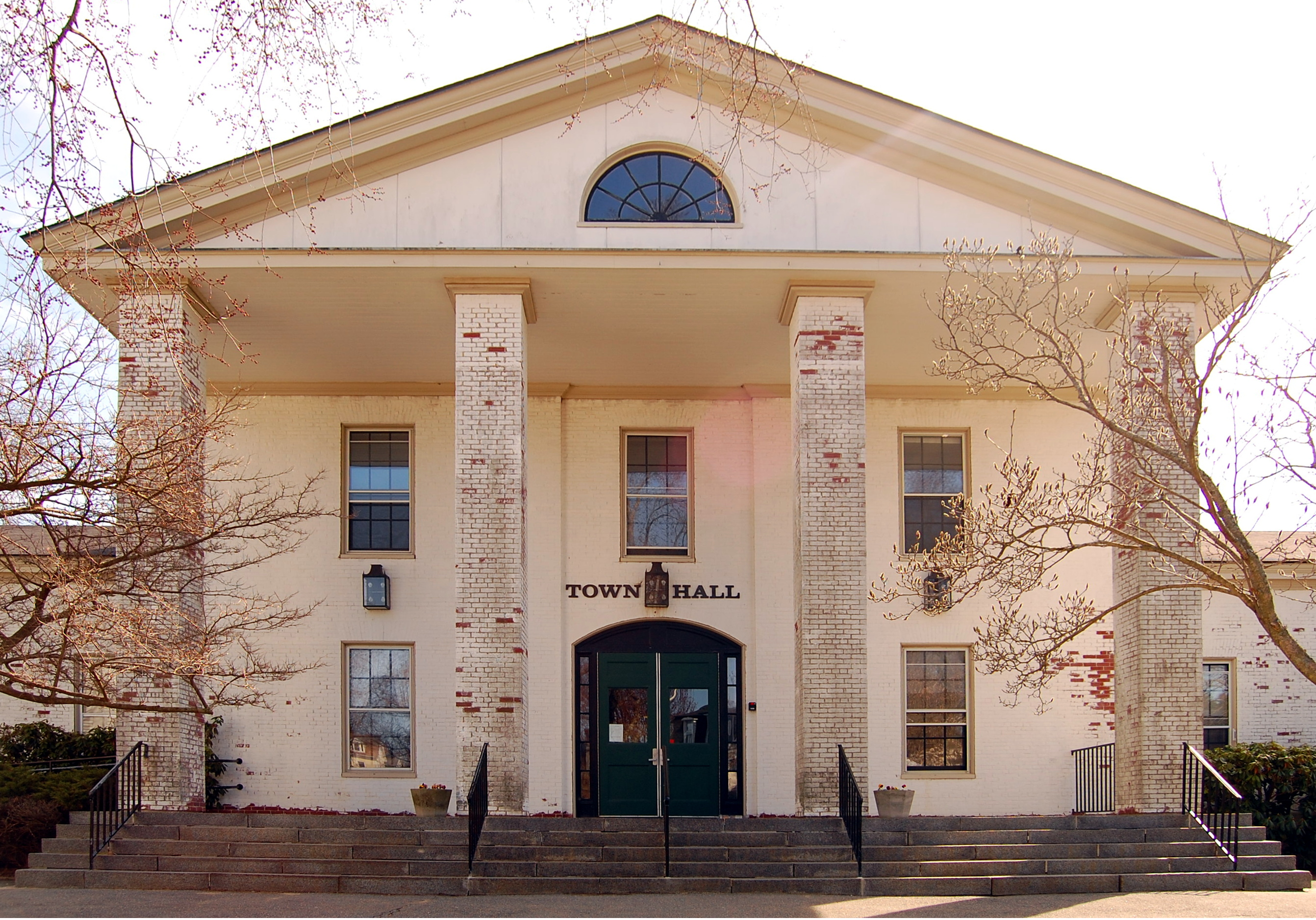
Town Hall

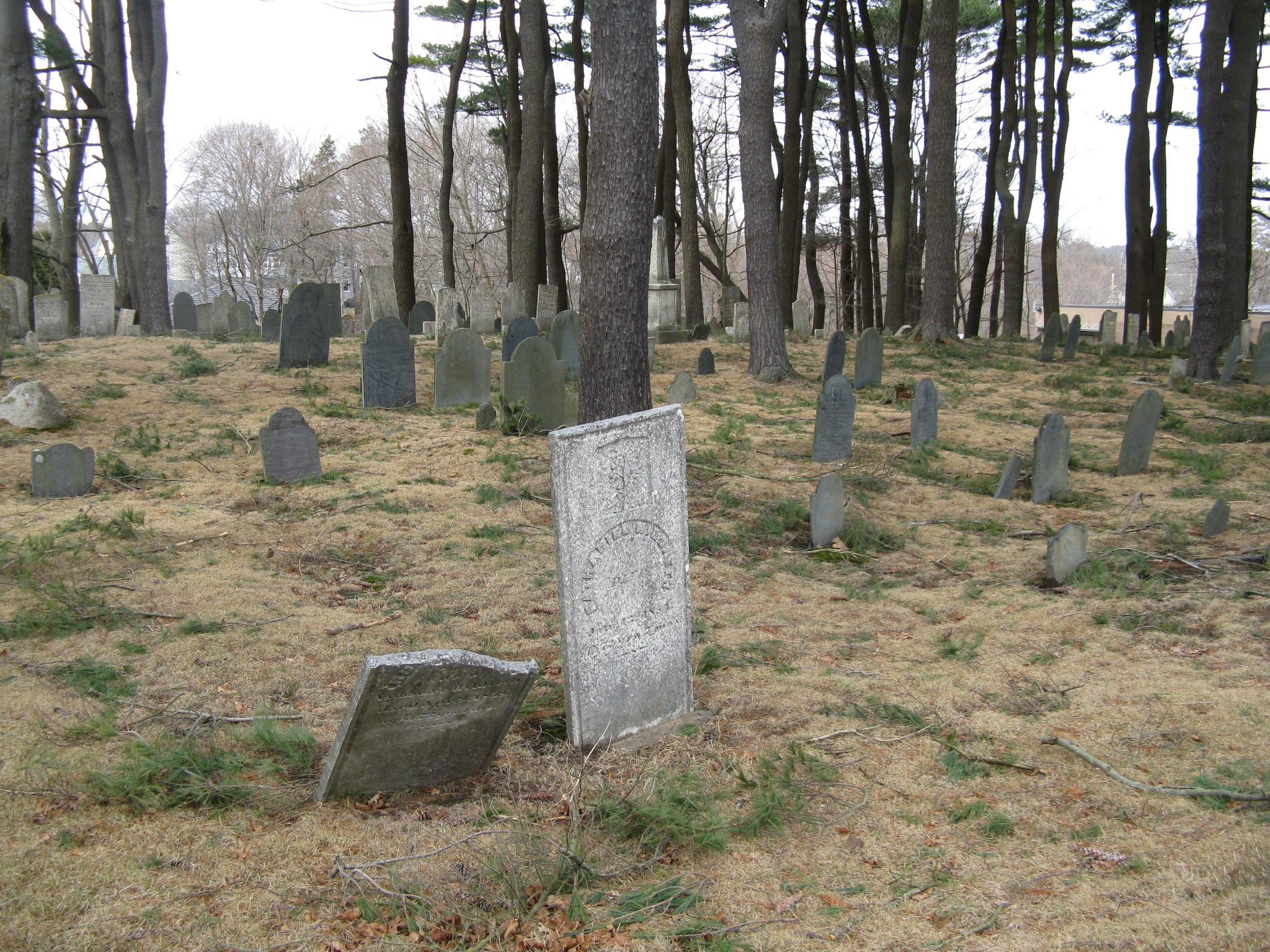
Old Burial Ground

== Film and television references ==
The town provided the backdrop for these films:

- Tell Me That You Love Me, Junie Moon (1970)
- Mermaids (1990)
- The Good Son (1993)
- The Love Letter (1999)
- State and Main (2000)
- What's the Worst That Could Happen? (2001; standing in for Marblehead, Massachusetts)
- The Proposal (2009; standing in for Sitka, Alaska)
- Edge of Darkness (2010)
- Joy (2015)
- Manchester by the Sea (2016)
- Daddy's Home 2 (2017)

It was also featured in a season of the TV series This Old House, and was featured in a "Main Streets and Back Roads" episode of Chronicle, a newsmagazine program in New England.

== Notable people ==
- Junius Brutus Booth Jr., brother of John Wilkes Booth, Abraham Lincoln's assassin. Died September 17, 1883. Buried in Manchester-by-the-Sea
- Nat Faxon, comedian and Oscar winner for adapted screenplay for The Descendants at the 84th Academy Awards
- Josh Gates, host of Destination Truth, Expedition Unknown , and other Discovery shows —former resident
- Rufus Gifford, United States ambassador to the Kingdom of Denmark from 2013 to 2017
- Elizabeth Porter Gould, poet and author
- Sprague Grayden, actress
- Henry Northey Hooper, manufacturer and Boston politician
- William Northey Hooper, a founder of the sugar industry in Hawaii
- Joe Lloyd, professional golfer
- James McMillan, Michigan senator instrumental in the design of the Washington Mall, died (1902) at his summer home in Manchester-by-the-Sea
- Susan Minot, author
- Ghislaine Maxwell, convicted child sex trafficker
- Ray Ozzie, software entrepreneur
- George Putnam III, trustee of Putnam Investments
- Gardner Read, composer
- David I. Robinson, politician
- Jay Severin, radio talk show host
- Josiah Spaulding, businessman, attorney, and politician; chairman of the Massachusetts Republican Party from 1965 to 1970
