= William Northey Hooper =

William Northey Hooper (1809–1878) was born in Manchester, Massachusetts to the Massachusetts Hooper family of shipmasters and merchants. In 1835, with two other investors, he founded and operated Ladd & Co., which operated the Old Sugar Mill of Koloa, the first large scale sugar producer in Hawaii. It marked the birth of what became Hawaii's leading agricultural industry for over 150 years. Hooper later served as Consul to the Kingdom of Hawaii, and was a founder of the San Francisco Chamber of Commerce.

== Life ==
In 1832, the partners sailed from Boston for Honolulu, via Valparaíso, on the Hellespont. The ship was originally feared burnt at sea, but the voyagers arrived the following year. At about the age of 24, Hooper’s role was to establish and operate the plantations. Starting from this plantation on land leased from King Kamehameha III, sugar became the principal industry in Hawaii, surpassing whaling, and the driving force behind 350,000 people from all over the world immigrating to the islands to work in its plantations.

Sugar remained the leading industry in Hawaii until about 1960, when supplanted by tourism, but Hooper’s plantings were still in production in 1985. The site of the Ladd plantation has been designated a National Historic Landmark, and sugar’s prominence in the island economy played a key role behind the U.S. annexation of the Hawaiian Islands.

Hooper was the son of William Hooper, sea captain of Manchester, MA, and Sally Northey. His brother was the Boston manufacturer Henry Northey Hooper and his nephew was abolitionist Lewis Northey Tappan. Hooper married Charlotte Augusta Wood, who sailed from Boston with her brother, Dr. Robert Wood, and the three Ladd partners. The couple eventually left Hawaii and settled in San Francisco in 1848, where he helped establish the first Chamber of Commerce, was a prosperous merchant in the firm of Cross, Hobson & Co., and served on the city’s debt committee.

Hooper died in 1878. The Sugar Monument in Koloa, built in 1985 to commemorate the 150th anniversary of commercial sugar production, relates the story of Hooper's operation and depicts the founders and workers who built the sugar industry in Hawaii.
