= Abraham P. Grant =

American politician (1804–1871)

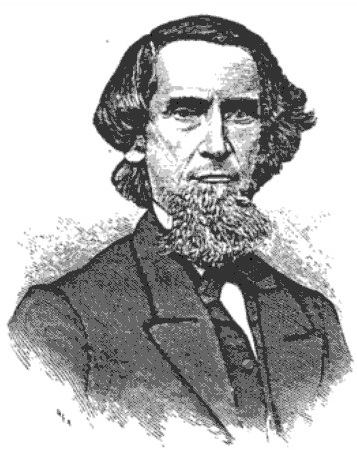

Member of the U.S. House of Representatives from New York's 17 district
- In office March 4, 1837 – March 3, 1839
- Preceded by: Joel Turrill
- Succeeded by: John G. Floyd

Personal details
- Born: Abraham Phineas Grant; April 5, 1804 New Lebanon, New York, U.S.
- Died: December 11, 1871 (aged 67) Oswego, New York, U.S.
- Resting place: Riverside Cemetery, Oswego, New York, U.S.
- Party: Democratic
- Education: Hamilton College
- Profession: Politician, lawyer

Abraham Phineas Grant (April 5, 1804 – December 11, 1871) was an American lawyer and politician who served one term as a U.S. representative from New York from 1837 to 1839.

== Biography ==
Born in New Lebanon, New York, Grant attended the public schools and graduated from Hamilton College in Clinton, New York. He then studied law, and was admitted to the bar in 1828. He commenced practice in Oswego, New York, and served as district attorney of Oswego County in 1835.

=== Congress ===
Grant was elected as a Democrat to the Twenty-fifth Congress (March 4, 1837 – March 3, 1839). He resumed the practice of law.

=== Death ===
He died in Oswego, New York, December 11, 1871. He was interred in Riverside Cemetery.

U.S. House of Representatives
Preceded by Joel Turrill	Member of the U.S. House of Representatives from New York's 17th congressional district 1837–1839	Succeeded by John G. Floyd
