= Emmert =

Emmert is a surname. Notable people with the surname include:

- Chad Emmert (born 1966), American songwriter
- Emil Emmert (1844–1911), who formulated Emmert's law of optics
- František Emmert (born 1974), writer
- František Gregor Emmert (1940–2015), composer
- James Emmert (1895–1974), American jurist from Indiana
- Kirk R. Emmert, American political scientist
- Mark Emmert (born 1952), American athletics administrator
- Paul Emmert (1826–1867), Swiss-born American artist

== See also ==
- Emert, a surname
