= Kaniakapūpū =

Historic ruin in Hawaii, United States

Coordinates: 21°21′02.7″N 157°48′52.07″W

- U.S. National Register of Historic Places
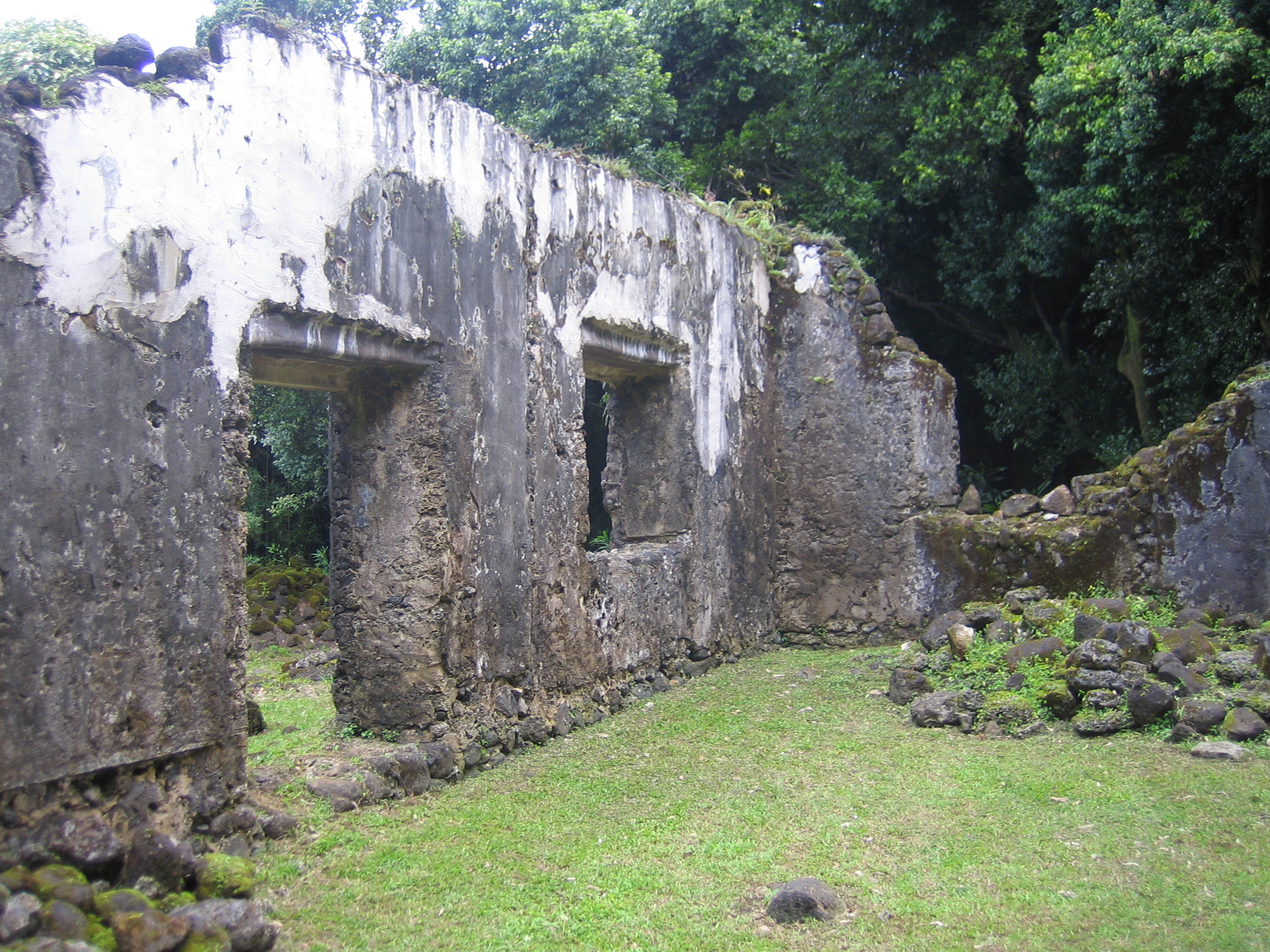
- Ruins of Kaniakapūpū

- Location within Hawaii
- Nearest city: Nuʻuanu, Hawaii
- Built: 1845
- NRHP reference No.: 86002805
- Added to NRHP: October 15, 1986

Kaniakapūpū ("the singing of the land shells"), known formerly as Luakaha ("place of relaxation"), is the ruins of the former summer palace of King Kamehameha III and Queen Kalama on the island of Oahu in Hawaii. Built in the 1840s, and situated in the cool uplands of the Nuʻuanu Valley, it served as the king and queen's summer retreat after the capital of the Kingdom of Hawaii moved from Lahaina to Honolulu in 1845. It was famous for being the site of a grand luau attended by an estimated ten thousand guests during the 1847 Hawaiian Sovereignty Restoration Day celebration. The palace had fallen into ruins by 1874; no records exist about its condition in the intervening years. Rediscovered in the 1950s, the site was cleared and efforts were made to stabilize the ruins from further damage by the elements and invasive plant growth. The site remains officially off-limits to the public and trespassers are subjected to citations, although the site is not regularly monitored.

== Name ==
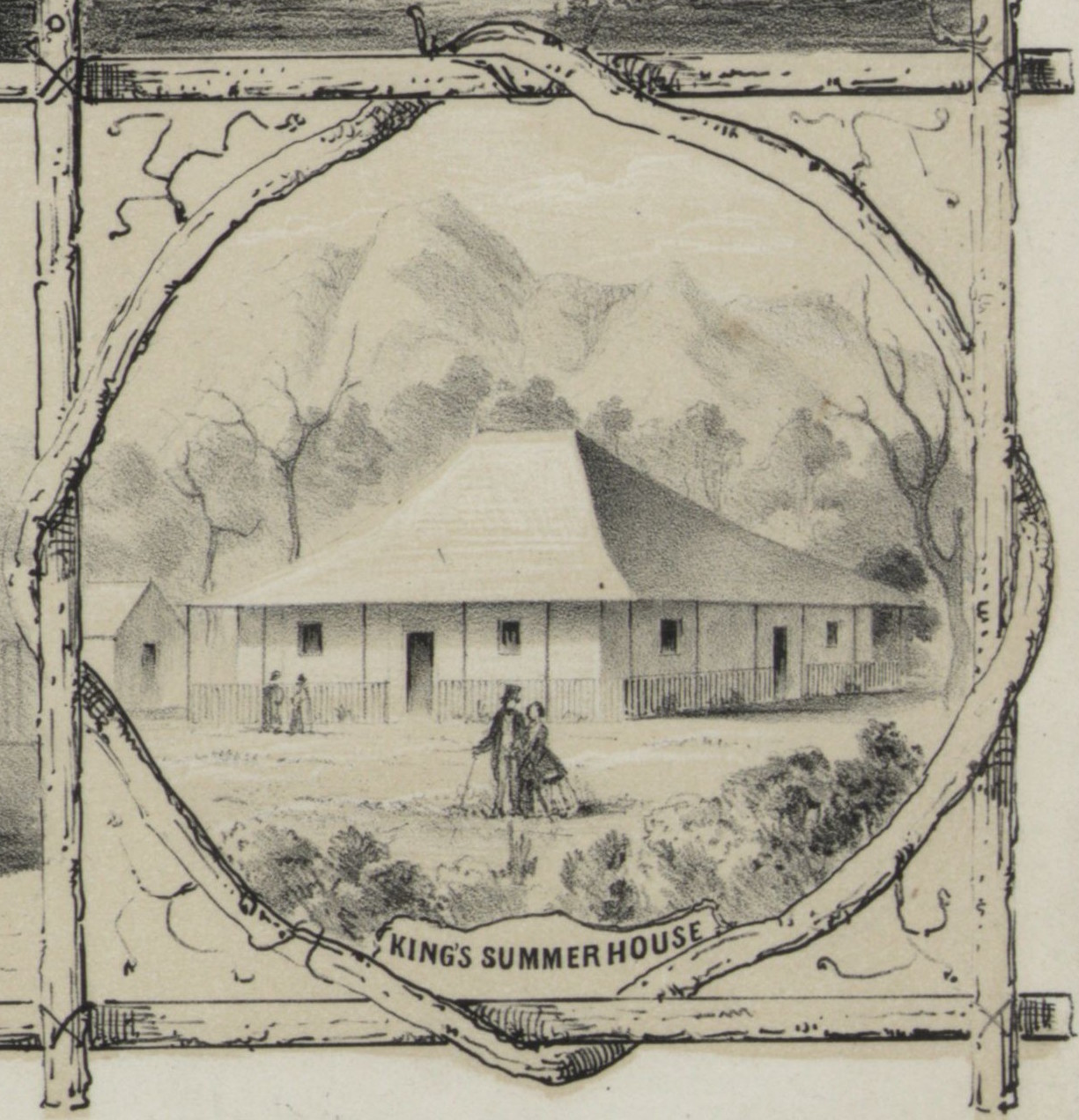
King's Summer House (1853), lithograph by Paul Emmert

Kaniakapūpū is the current and most commonly used name of the site and palace. It means "the singing of the land shells" in the Hawaiian language. The name refers to the kāhuli (Oʻahu tree snails) which were once abundant in the area and, according to Hawaiian folklore, able to vocalize and sing sweet songs at night. Archaeologist Susan A. Lebo and anthropologist James M. Bayman, writing in 2001, claim that the name is a modern misnomer, possibly originating in the early 20th century. Moʻolelo (oral accounts) from this period associate the name with the remnants of a stone structure to the southeast of the house, believed to be a heiau (temple) dedicated to Lono, the Hawaiian god of fertility and healing. Tradition states that the king may have chosen to build his house on the heiau because of the mana (spiritual power) associated with the area. The contemporaneous Hale Aliʻi (ʻIolani Palace) was built on the site of a heiau called Kaʻahaimauli.

According to Lebo and Bayman, the actual region of Kaniakapūpū and Kaniakapūpū Heiau (also called Kawaluna Heiau) was located in the Waolani area of Oahu; contemporary records do not mention a heiau onsite or the king building his house on top of one. Kawaluna Heiau was associated with Kūaliʻi, the 16th-century aliʻi nui of Oahu, who asserted his control of the Kona district (the area encompassing much of modern Honolulu) after a ceremony at the temple. One of the earliest references to Kaniakapūpū and its association with Kawaluna Heiau was in the "Legend of Kamaakamahiai", published on August 13, 1870, in the Hawaiian-language newspaper Kuokoa. It stated: "...where the house of our King now stands. Kawaluna was its name in the old days and Kaniakapūpū is its name today".

Luakaha ("place of relaxation") was the name of the property during the king's lifetime, and originates from the name of the traditional ʻili kū (land division) of the ahupuaʻa of Honolulu, which encompassed a third of the forested upper slopes of Nuʻuanu Valley. There are no records of the house itself having any specific name, though when it was in use it was referred to as "the king's house, cottage, or retreat in Luakaha or Nuʻuanu". Luakaha was one of the many strategic grounds occupied by King Kalanikūpule during King Kamehameha I's invasion of the island of Oahu in 1795. Traditions state that Kamehameha rested his troops near the site during this campaign, which culminated in the decisive Battle of Nuʻuanu in which many of the defeated Oahu warriors were pushed off the Nuʻuanu Pali to their deaths.

== History ==
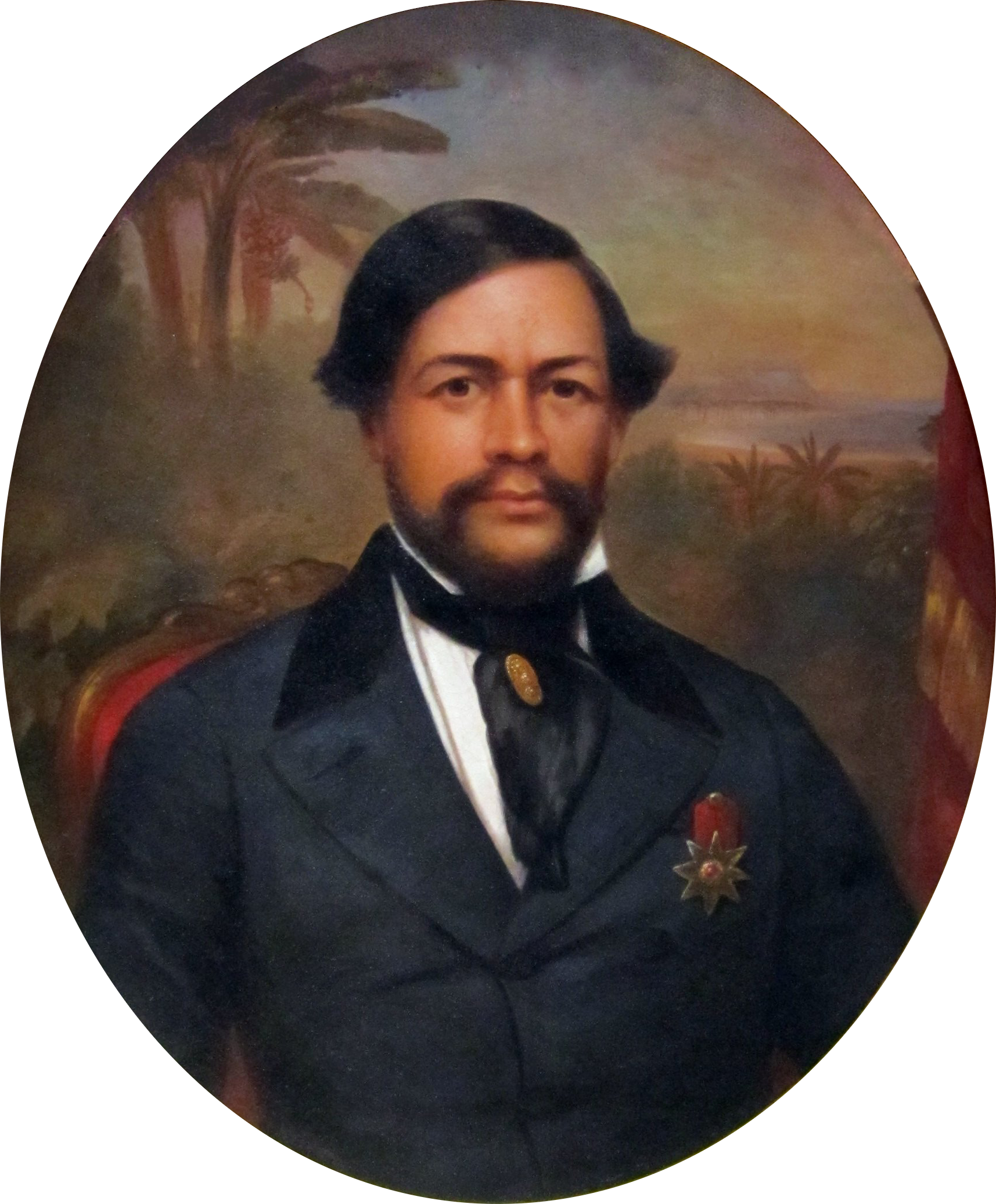
King Kamehameha III

In the early 19th century, Honolulu was situated on a dust plain. The aridity and lack of water, save for the Nuʻuanu Stream, prompted many residents to seek reprieve a few miles outside of town in the forested uplands of the Nuʻuanu Valley. In this suburb, American missionaries, white merchants, and the Hawaiian royals built European-style homes to escape the summer heat. The site of Luakaha was located 5 miles (8.0 km) outside the city and was reachable by horse and carriage. The claim on the area was relinquished by Charles Kanaʻina during the Great Māhele of 1848, and it became a part of the Crown Lands. Kamehameha III also allocated a nearby piece of land to his advisor and friend Keoni Ana, who built Hānaiakamalama to be near the king.

Kaniakapūpū was built prior to the capital of the Kingdom of Hawaii moving to Honolulu from Lahaina in 1845. Along with Hale Aliʻi, the king's new official residence in the center of town, and a summer retreat in the Nuʻuanu Valley, the new royal residences were built to resemble the spatial-cultural geography of Mokuʻula, the king's royal residential complex in Lahaina. On July 5, 1842, American missionary Amos Starr Cooke, the teacher of Royal School, wrote in his journal that Governor Kekūanaōʻa was in the process of building a "stone house" for the king in Luakaha.

The retreat was completed in 1845 and became a place for entertaining foreign celebrities, chiefs, and commoners. On Hawaiian Sovereignty Restoration Day (Lā Hoʻihoʻi Ea) in 1847, King Kamehameha III and Queen Kalama hosted a grand luau at the palace. The celebration commemorated the fourth anniversary of the restoration of Hawaiian independence and sovereignty by British Rear-Admiral Richard Darton Thomas, following a five-month British occupation of the kingdom during the Paulet Affair of 1843. The luau was attended by an estimated ten thousand guests. The palace may also have been the site of an earlier luau, or great ahaʻaina (feast), which was part of the initial ten-day restoration festivities in 1842. Children from the Royal School, including all of the future Hawaiian monarchs, often visited with their teachers (the Cookes).

By 1874, a map of the region labeled the area as the "Old Ruins", implying a dilapidated state. No records exist as to why the site was abandoned.

=== Contemporary descriptions ===
Danish explorer Steen Anderson Bille visited Oahu in October 1846 while circumnavigating the globe on the corvette Galathea between 1845 and 1847. Besides having an audience with King Kamehameha III at Hale Aliʻi, and commenting on Honolulu social life, Bille wrote a description of Luakaha:

One of the most distant county seats on the right side of the road is that of the King. It is rather a large building with a surrounding porch, and does not distinguish itself by any architectural beauty. A small cottage build by an Englishman on the road a little before the King's house is reached, is still more insignificant, but if you pass to the rear of its garden you will see a seething fall cascading down from a height of more than 70 feet.

Another account was written in 1908 by Gorham D. Gilman, a New England merchant who resided in Lahaina and Honolulu from 1840 to 1861:

The last building in the valley after the foreign style is His Majesty's country seat, at which he spends considerable time during the summer. It is about five miles from town, and a pleasant ride. It is in a fine situation and is surrounded by many of the original forest trees. It is a plain stone building with one large room and two sleeping rooms, the whole surrounded by a wide veranda enclosed by a neat paling fence. It was here that the great meal fete was given by His Majesty to Admiral Thomas at the time of restoration.

== Modern conservation ==
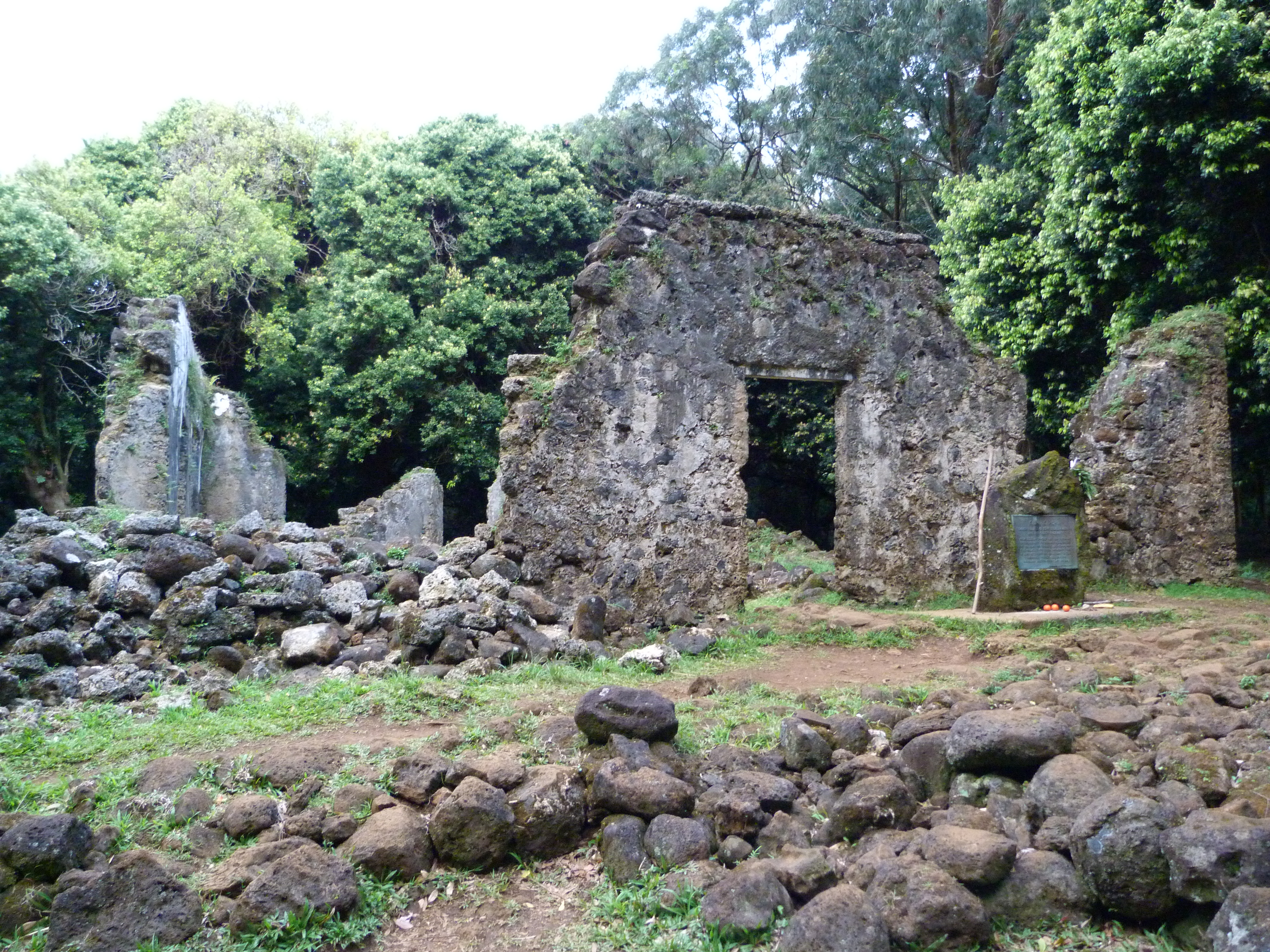
Ruins of Kaniakapūpū, 2015

The area was rediscovered in the 1950s, and the Territorial Commission on Historic Sites cleared and stabilized the ruins onsite. However, the site deteriorated over the next 30 years due to a lack of maintenance. A fund was created by the Historic Hawaii Foundation in 1998 to pay for preservation work on the ruins, which was completed two years later. An archaeological survey was also conducted around this time. Today, the site is managed by the State Historic Preservation Division of Hawaii's Department of Land and Natural Resources (DLNR) with the help of the Historic Hawaii Foundation and other local preservation organizations, including the Aha Hui Malama O Kaniakapūpū. Kaniakapūpū was added as site 66000293 to the National Register of Historic Places on October 15, 1966.

Kaniakapūpū is located at the end of an unmarked trail off the Pali Highway. The property is near the Luakaha Falls, and the surrounding area and trail leading up to the site are covered by a forest of invasive bamboo. Periodic clearing is necessary in order to halt the deteriorating effects of invasive root growth. The trail and ruins, which are located in a protected watershed, are officially off-limits to the public, although state DLNR officials do not regularly monitor the site. Trespassers are subjected to citations if caught.

=== Vandalism ===
In 2016, Kaniakapūpū was damaged by vandals who scratched crosses into the historic stone walls. Previously, tourists had etched initials and other markings, while others often leaned, sat, or climbed on the walls for photo shoots. These actions further degraded the ancient structure. State DLNR officials and volunteers denounced these acts as "utter disrespect" for the cultural importance of the site.

Social media was blamed for bringing unwanted visitors to the site and not pointing out that the area is off-limits to the public. Following these acts of vandalism, the state of Hawaii asked for the removal of directions to Kaniakapūpū on many social media websites and tourism blogs, and encouraged those who knew the direction to the ruins to come with respect.

== Plaque ==
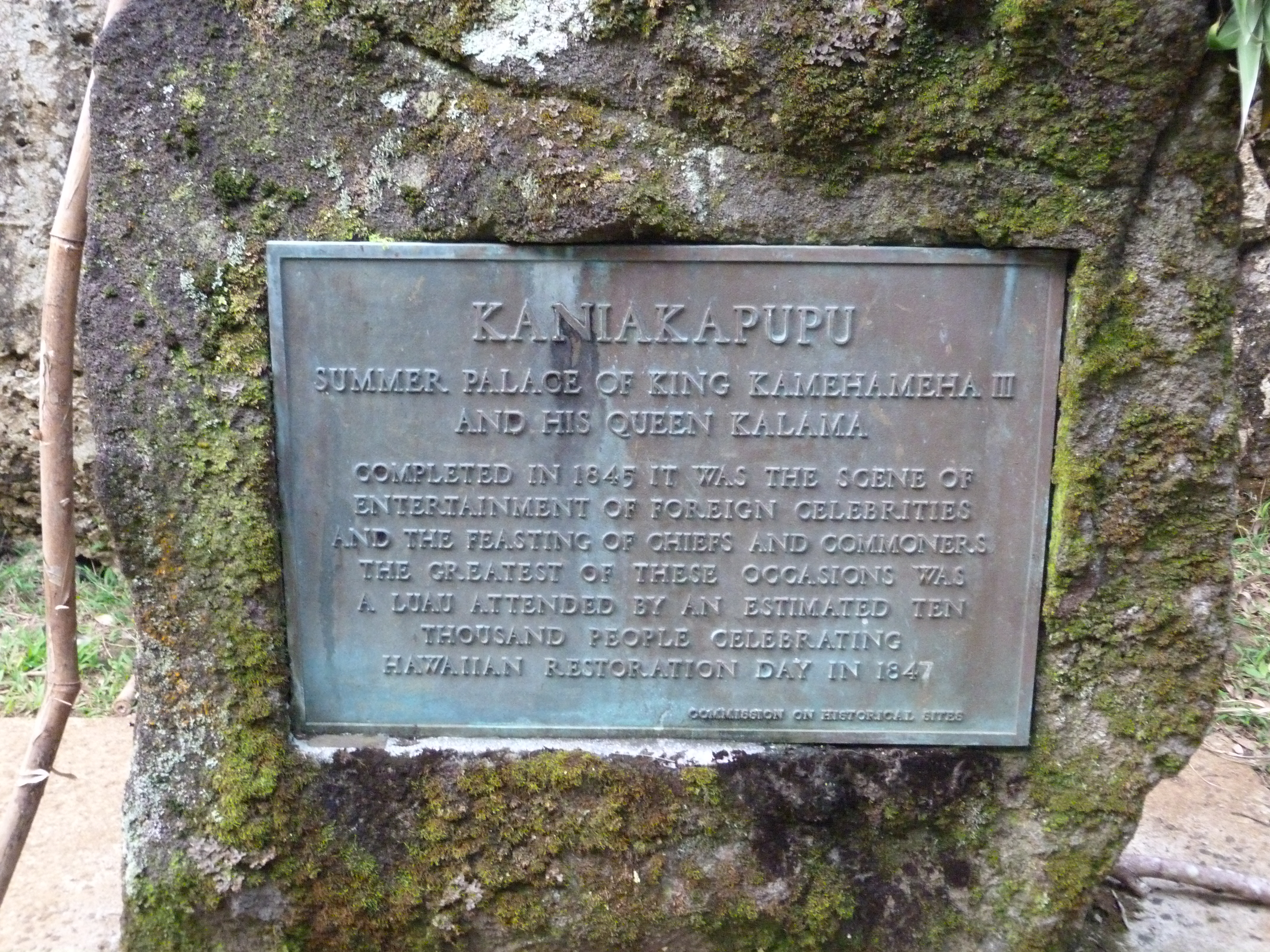
Historical plaque at the ruins of Kaniakapūpū

A plaque was erected at Kaniakapūpū by the Commission on Historical Sites, which reads:

KANIAKAPUPU
SUMMER PALACE OF KING KAMEHAMEHA III AND HIS QUEEN KALAMA
COMPLETED IN 1845 IT WAS THE SCENE OF ENTERTAINMENT OF FOREIGN CELEBRITIES AND THE FEASTING OF CHIEFS AND COMMONERS. THE GREATEST OF THESE OCCASIONS WAS A LUAU ATTENDED BY AN ESTIMATED TEN THOUSAND PEOPLE CELEBRATING HAWAIIAN RESTORATION DAY IN 1847.

— COMMISSION ON HISTORICAL SITES

== See also ==
- Hānaiakamalama, the summer palace of Queen Emma and King Kamehameha IV

== Bibliography ==
- "State asking websites to remove information on closed Hawaiian palace". Honolulu Star-Advertiser. Honolulu. Associated Press. June 28, 2016.
- Becket, Jan; Singer, Joseph (1999). Pana Oʻahu: Sacred Stones, Sacred Land. Honolulu: University of Hawaii Press. ISBN 978-0-8248-1828-9. OCLC 245917233 – via Project MUSE.
- Cooke, Amos Starr; Cooke, Juliette Montague (1937). Richards, Mary Atherton (ed.). The Chiefs' Children School: A Record Compiled from the Diary and Letters of Amos Starr Cooke and Juliette Montague Cooke, by Their Granddaughter Mary Atherton Richards. Honolulu: Honolulu Star-Bulletin. OCLC 1972890.
- Crowl, Janice (April–May 2011). "Kahuli Homecoming". Hana Hou!. Vol. 14, no. 2. Honolulu. Archived from the original on March 9, 2017.
- Cummins, John Adams (April 2, 1905). J. W. Girvin (ed.). "Reminences of the Reign of King Kamehameha III". The Pacific Commercial Advertiser. Honolulu. p. 5.
- Doughty, Andrew (2015). Oahu Revealed: The Ultimate Guide To Honolulu, Waikiki & Beyond. Lihue, HI: Wizard Publications, Incorporated. ISBN 978-0-9838887-9-6. OCLC 948826512.
- Dye, Bob (1997). Merchant Prince of the Sandalwood Mountains: Afong and the Chinese in Hawaiʻi. Honolulu: University of Hawaii Press. ISBN 978-0-8248-1772-5.
- Forbes, David W., ed. (2000). Hawaiian National Bibliography 1780–1900, Volume 2: 1831–1850. Vol. 2. Honolulu: University of Hawaii Press. ISBN 978-0-8248-2379-5.
- Gilman, Gorham D. (1892). Thrum, Thomas G. (ed.). "Restoration Day: A Recollection". Hawaiian Almanac and Annual for 1893. Honolulu: Honolulu Star-Bulletin. pp. 70–77. hdl:10524/663.
- Gilman, Gorham D. (1908). Thrum, Thomas G. (ed.). "Honolulu and its Suburbs in the Latter Forties". Hawaiian Almanac and Annual for 1909. Honolulu: Honolulu Star-Bulletin. pp. 118–128. hdl:10524/36166.
- Greer, Richard A. (1970). "Honolulu in 1847". Hawaiian Journal of History. 4: 59–95. hdl:10524/302 – via eVols.
- Hawaii. Minutes of the Privy Council, 1847–1849. Honolulu: Ka Huli Ao Center for Excellence in Native Hawaiian Law, William S. Richardson School of Law. Archived from the original on May 31, 2016.
- Hawaii Department of Land and Natural Resource (June 28, 2016). "DLNR News Release: Responsible social media helps prevent vandalism and destruction". State of Hawaii. Honolulu.
- Judd, Walter F. (1999). Hawaiʻi Joins the World. Honolulu: Mutual Publishing. ISBN 978-1-56647-227-2. OCLC 154607091.
- Judd, Walter F. (1975). Palaces and Forts of the Hawaiian Kingdom: From Thatch to American Florentine. Palo Alto, CA: Pacific Books, Publishers. ISBN 978-0-87015-216-0. OCLC 2073825.
- Kakesako, Gregg K. (June 23, 2016). "Vandals damage historic Hawaiian sites". Honolulu Star-Advertiser. Honolulu.
- Kamakau, Samuel (1992) [1961]. Ruling Chiefs of Hawaii (Revised ed.). Honolulu: Kamehameha Schools Press. ISBN 0-87336-014-1. OCLC 25008795.
- Ka Wai Ola Staff (August 2016). "Pono behavior needed at cultural sites". Ka Wai Ola. Vol. 33, no. 8. Honolulu. p. 4.
- Kelleher, Jennifer Sinco (June 23, 2016). "Vandals carve crosses on sacred Native Hawaiian palace". Associated Press. New York.
- Klieger, P. Christiaan (1998). Mokuʻula: Maui's Sacred Island. Honolulu: Bishop Museum Press. ISBN 978-1-58178-002-4. OCLC 40142899.
- Kuykendall, Ralph Simpson (1965) [1938]. The Hawaiian Kingdom 1778–1854, Foundation and Transformation. Vol. 1. Honolulu: University of Hawaii Press. ISBN 0-87022-431-X. OCLC 47008868.
- Lebo, Susan A.; Bayman, James M. (December 1, 2001). Stevenson, Christopher M.; Lee, Georgia; Morin, F. J.; Easter Island Foundation (eds.). "New Perspectives on Kaniakapupu, Nuʻuanu Valley, Oʻahu: Undertaking Archaeological Fieldwork within the Framework of a Hui". Pacific 2000: Proceedings of the Fifth International Congress on Easter Island and the Pacific on Easter Island and the Pacific. Los Ocos, CA: Bearsville Press. ISBN 9781880636183. OCLC 52907564.
- National Park Service (October 15, 1986). "National Register Information System". National Register of Historic Places. National Park Service.
- Pacific Worlds (2003). "Kaniakapupu". Pacific Worlds.
- Pukui, Mary Kawena; Elbert, Samuel H.; Mookini, Esther T. (1974). Place Names of Hawaii. Honolulu: University of Hawaii Press. ISBN 978-0-8248-0524-1. OCLC 1042464.
- Soehren, Lloyd J. (2010). "Kaniakapupu". Hawaiian Place Names – via Ulukau, the Hawaiian Electronic Library.
- Soehren, Lloyd J. (2010). "Luakaha". Hawaiian Place Names – via Ulukau, the Hawaiian Electronic Library.
- Sterling, Elspeth P.; Summers, Catherine C. (1978). Sites of Oahu. Honolulu: Department of Anthropology, Department of Education, Bernice P. Bishop Museum. ISBN 978-0-910240-73-4. OCLC 23115654.
- Thrum, Thomas G., ed. (1929). "Holiday Observances In Monarchial Days". Hawaiian Almanac and Annual for 1930. Honolulu: Honolulu Star-Bulletin. pp. 101–106. hdl:10524/32427.
- Valcourt, Katrina (November 23, 2016). "The 5 Most Endangered Historic Places in Hawaiʻi". Hawaiʻi Magazine. Honolulu. Archived from the original on November 24, 2016.
- Wakida, Clayton (June 23, 2016). "Vandals desecrate King Kamehameha III summer palace". KITV 4 News. Honolulu. Archived from the original on October 11, 2016.
- Woodward, Christopher (2007). American Ruins. London: Merrell Publishers. ISBN 978-1-85894-406-7. OCLC 154658675.
