= Emert =

Emert is a surname. Notable people with the surname include:

- George H. Emert (1938–2018), American academic administrator
- Oliver Emert (1902–1975), American set decorator
- Paul Emert (1826–1867), Swiss-born American artist

== See also ==
- Emmert
