= Adrián Demoč =

Slovak composer

Adrián Demoč (born 10 January 1985 in Zvolen) is a Slovak composer.

== Biography ==
From 2003 to 2008 Demoč attended the Janáček Academy of Music and Performing Arts in Brno, Czech Republic, where he studied composition with František Emmert. During this period he also had internships in Bucharest and Vilnius.

His doctoral dissertation (Brno, 2011) was on the topic of spectral music. His own compositions show the influence of American composers including Morton Feldman. He also often uses Slovak folk instruments, including the fujara.

His works include a wide variety of chamber, choral and orchestral music, including a sextet "Still life and a chord" (2021), for early music instruments including lute and gittern.
