= Nuʻuanu Pali =

Section of the windward cliff of the Koʻolau mountain on Oʻahu, Hawaii

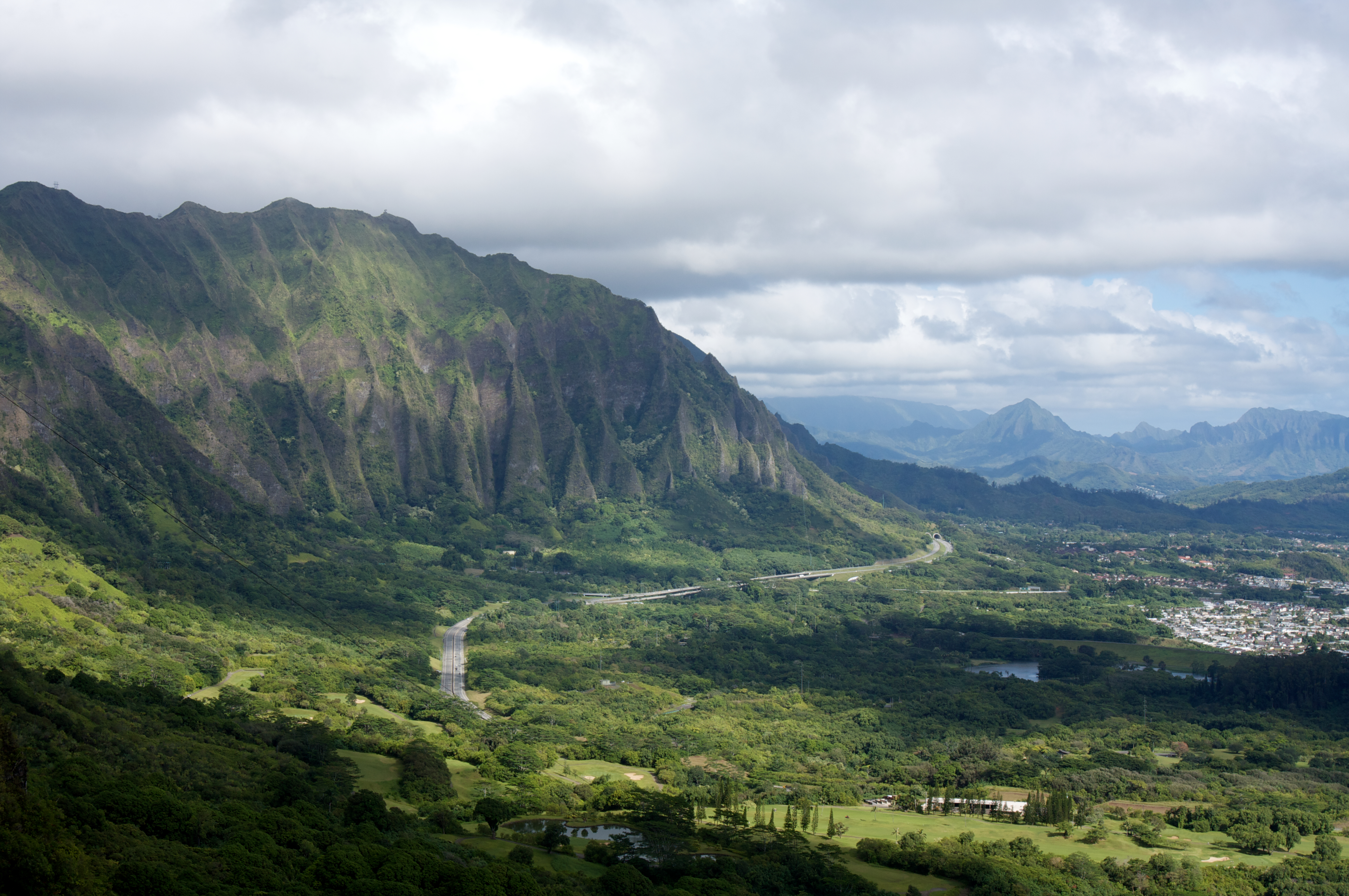
- Looking towards the northern Koʻolau Range from the Nuʻuanu Pali overlook

- Location within Oahu Location within Hawaii
- Elevation: 1,168 ft (356 m)
- Traversed by: Route 61

Location
- Location: Hawaii; United States
- Coordinates: 21°22′01″N 157°47′36″W
- Topo map: USGS Honolulu

Nuʻuanu Pali is a section of the windward cliff (pali in Hawaiian) of the Koʻolau mountain, located at the head of Nuʻuanu Valley on the island of Oʻahu. It has a panoramic view of the windward (northeast) coast of Oʻahu. The Pali Highway (Hawaii State Highway 61) connecting Kailua/Kāneʻohe with downtown Honolulu runs through the Nuʻuanu Pali Tunnels bored into the cliffside.

The area is also the location of the Nuʻuanu Freshwater Fish Refuge and the Nuʻuanu Reservoir, in the jurisdiction of the Hawaiʻi Department of Land and Natural Resources.

The Nuʻuanu Pali State Wayside is a lookout above the tunnels where there is an exceptional view of Oʻahu's windward side with views of Kāneʻohe, Kāneʻohe Bay, and Kailua. It is also well known for strong trade winds that blow through the pass (now bypassed by the Nuʻuanu Pali Tunnels). The Nuʻuanu Pali Tunnels were built in 1958. Before this road opened, people would use what is now known as the Old Pali Road, currently a popular hiking route.

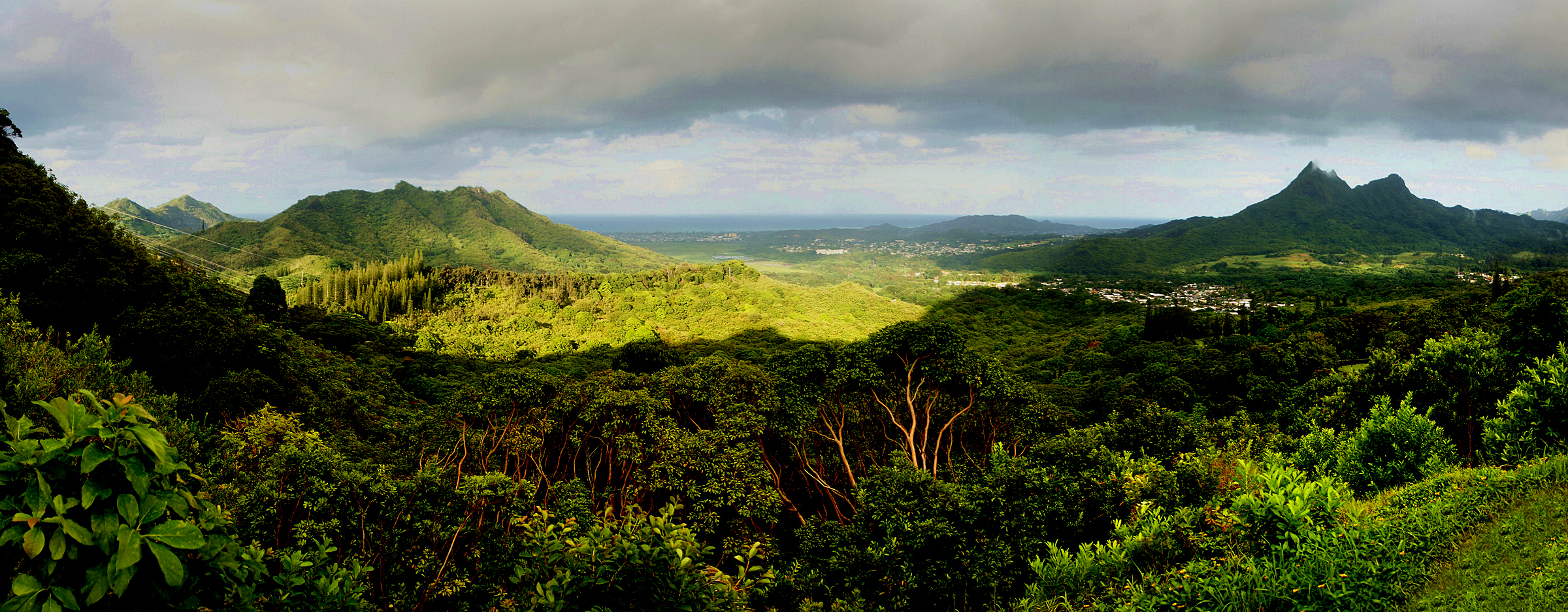
View of the windward coast of Oʻahu from Nu'uanu Pali

== History ==
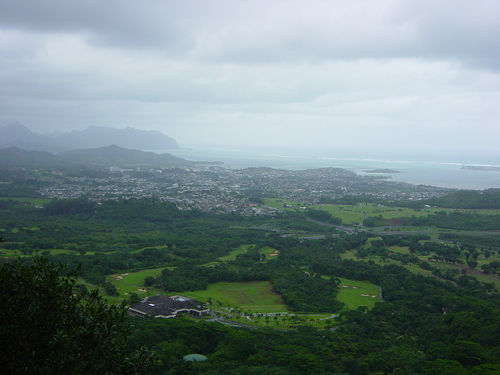
Looking north from the overlook at Kāneʻohe town and Kāneʻohe Bay beyond.

The Nuʻuanu Pali has been a vital pass from ancient times to the present because it is a low, traversable section of the Koʻolau mountain range that connects the leeward side of the mountains, Honolulu to the windward side, Kailua and Kāneʻohe. The route drew settlers who formed villages in the area and populated Nuʻuanu Valley for a thousand years.

The Nuʻuanu Pali was the site of the Battle of Nuʻuanu, one of the bloodiest battles in Hawaiian history, in which Kamehameha I conquered the island of Oʻahu, bringing it under his rule. In 1795 Kamehameha I sailed from his home island of Hawaiʻi with an army of 10,000 warriors, including a handful of non-Hawaiian foreigners. After conquering the islands of Maui and Molokaʻi, he moved on to Oʻahu. The pivotal battle for the island occurred in Nuʻuanu Valley, where the defenders of Oʻahu, led by Kalanikūpule, were driven back up into the valley where they were trapped above the cliff. Kamehamehaʻs warriors forced Maui Chief Kalanikupule's men to their deaths off of the cliff. Roughly 400 warriors died in this battle.

In 1845 the first road was built over the Nuʻuanu Pali, to connect Windward Oʻahu with Honolulu. In 1898, as this road was developed into a highway, workers found 800 human skulls—believed to be the remains of the warriors who fell to their deaths from the cliff above. This road was later replaced by the Pali Highway and the Nuʻuanu Pali Tunnels in 1959, which is the route used today.

The now extinct bird, the Oʻahu nukupuʻu, was last collected in this valley.

There is also a legend that takes place around the Nuʻuanu Pali. This is The Ghost Dog Legend. This legend states that when people came across this dog on the Pali, they had to turn back around or else they would not make it up the steep mountain. Because of these events, it is said that coming across this dog would lead to kaupe, meaning disaster.

== Nuʻuanu Reservoir ==
The Nuʻuanu Reservoir is located up the Nuʻuanu Pali heading towards Kailua, in the valley jungle. This small body of water holds various species of catfish, and peacock bass. In efforts towards preserving the reservoir, appointments must be made half a year prior to the visiting date. This ensures a controlled number of residents that fish out of the waters, preventing overfishing. A fresh water game fishing license and an entry fishing card are required to fish there. There is a two fish per license limit, and any catfish that is 16 inches or larger must be kept.

== Nuʻuanu Trail ==
The trail to Nuʻuanu began at Kalanikahua and led north of Kaumakapili Church to below the stream which flowed out of Kamanuwai pond. There the trail turned slightly to the right, went along the edge of the pond, and down into the water. Then, coming up on the bank onto Waiakemi, it led on to Waakekupua, along the bank of the taro patches, to the Pauoa stream, up to Pualoalo, and on to the gap at Nuʻuanu Pali.

== Superstition ==
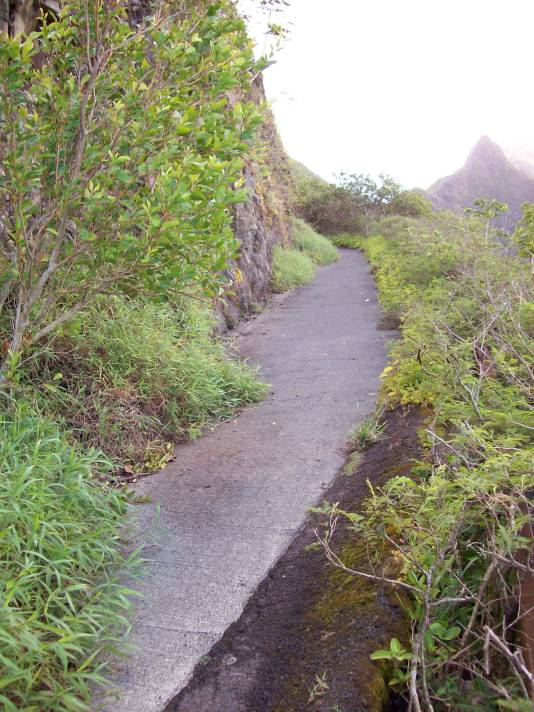
Decaying remains of the Old Pali Road.

Two large stones near the back of Nuʻuanu Valley, Hapuʻu and Ka-lae-hau-ola, were said to represent a pair of goddesses who were guardians of the passage down the pali. Travellers would leave offerings of flowers or kapa (bark cloth) to ensure a safe trip, and parents buried the umbilical cords of newborns under the stones as a protection against evil.

According to legend, the pass is inhabited by a moʻo wahine, a lizard who takes the form of a beautiful woman and leads male travelers to their deaths off the cliff, similar to a western poltergeist or mermaid.

Hawaiian folklore holds that people should never carry pork over Nuʻuanu Pali, especially at night. Pele, the volcano goddess, was responsible for preventing passage due to her contest with Kamapua'a, a half human, half hog god, and would not allow him (in the form of pork) to trespass on her side of the island.

== Cultural references ==
"Pali Gap" (Nu'uanu Pali into English) is the title of a track from the posthumous 1971 album Rainbow Bridge by the guitarist Jimi Hendrix.

'The Pali', together with surrounding areas such as Tantalus Crater, is the main setting in the novel Micro by Michael Crichton and Richard Preston.

The 2015 movie Pali Road is named for the old road over the Pali, although most of the action takes place elsewhere on Oahu.

== Places of interest ==
- Queen Emma's summer palace
- The summer palace of Kamehameha III
- Pali Highway
- Pali tunnels

== Photos ==
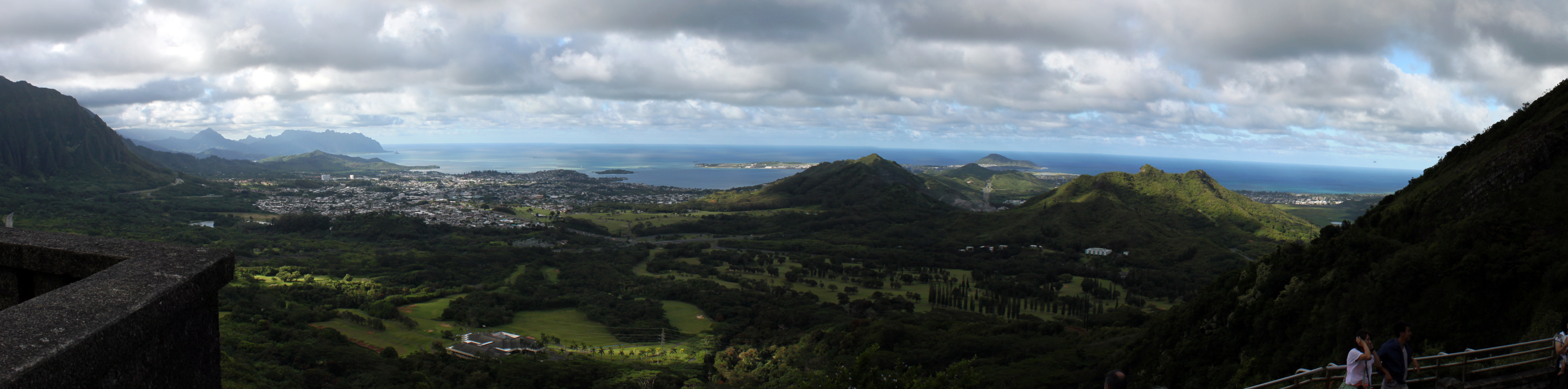
Panoramic view of Oahu as seen from Pali lookout

== See also ==
- National Landmark of Soaring
