= Nuʻuanu Pali Tunnels =

Highway tunnels in Honolulu

Coordinates: 21.3663°N 157.7935°W

Nu‘uanu Pali Tunnels
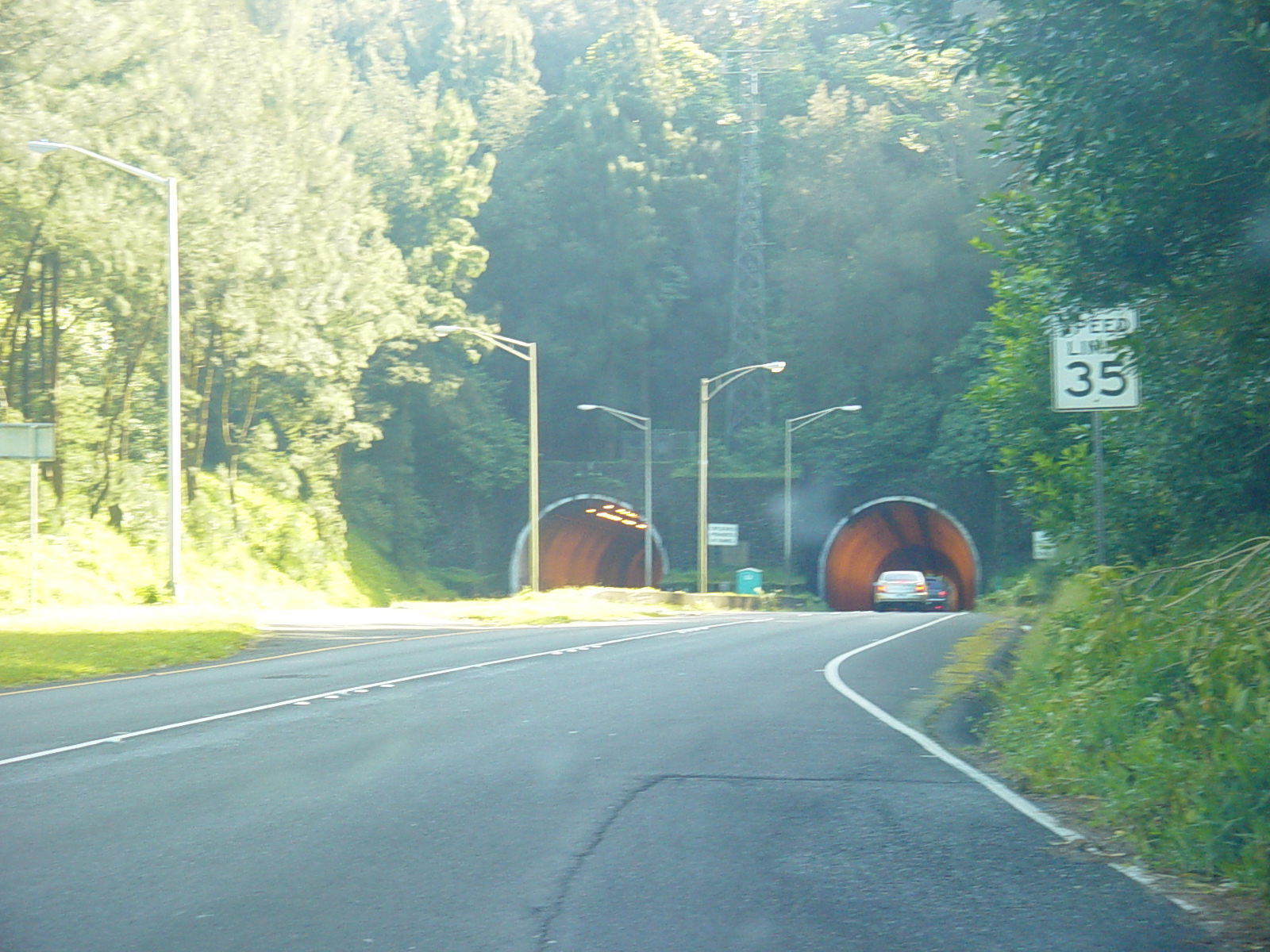
- Nu‘uanu Pali Tunnels traveling on Pali Highway windward bound.
- Interactive map of Nu‘uanu Pali Tunnels

Overview
- Route: Pali Highway (Hawaii Route 61)
- Crosses: Nuʻuanu Pali
- Start: Honolulu
- End: Windward Oʻahu

Operation
- Opened: 1959 or 1961
- Traffic: Automobile

The Nuʻuanu Pali Tunnels are a set of four highway tunnels (two in each direction) on the Pali Highway (Hawaii Route 61) which pass through the Nuʻuanu Pali in Hawaii, United States. These tunnels serve as one of three trans-Koʻolau routes between Honolulu (leeward Oʻahu) and the communities of windward Oʻahu. Also, the Nuʻuanu Pali Tunnels serve as a major transportation route from Kāneʻohe and Kailua over to Honolulu. These tunnels and the Pali Highway were built to provide a safer route through the mountain ridge, replacing a narrow, winding, and dangerous road over the mountain.
