= Dubí =

- Town
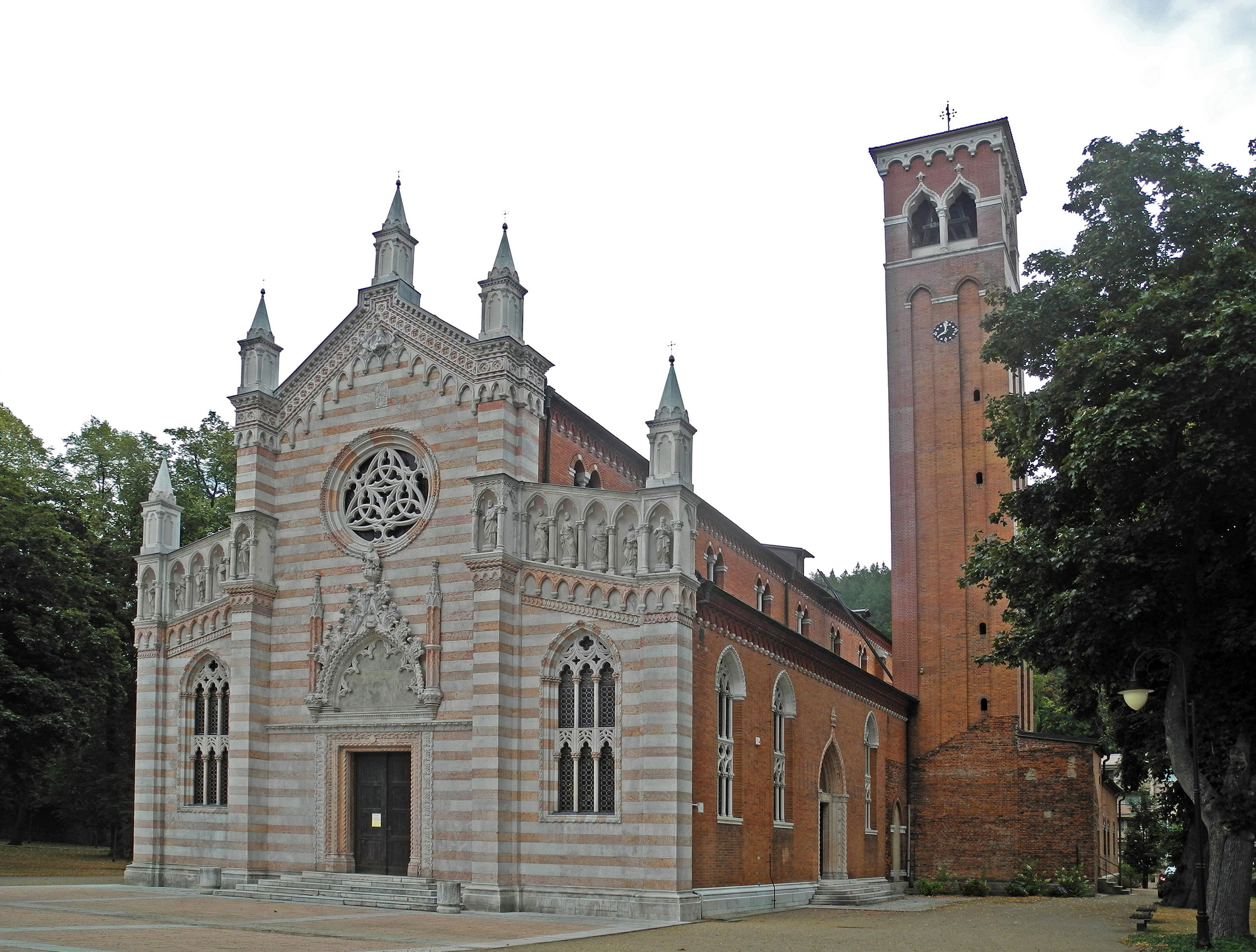
- Church of the Immaculate Conception of the Virgin Mary

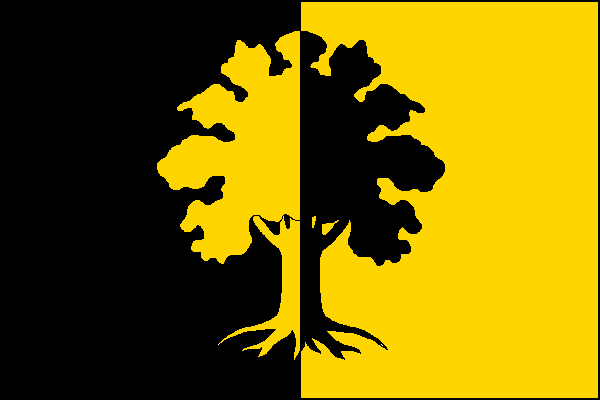
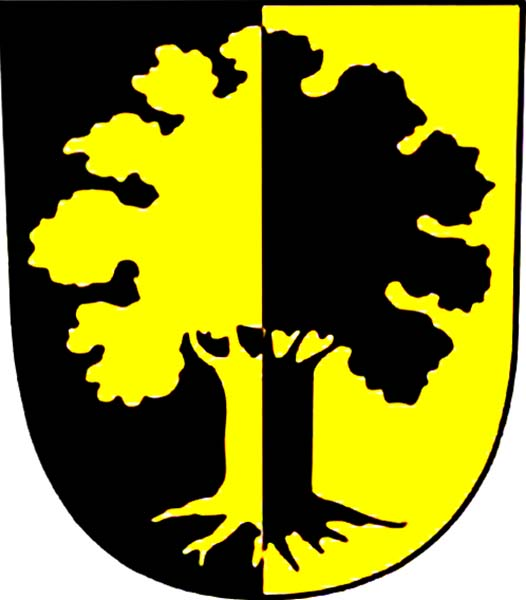
- Flag Coat of arms

- Location in the Czech Republic
- Coordinates: 50°40′44″N 13°47′27″E
- Country: Czech Republic
- Region: Ústí nad Labem
- District: Teplice
- First mentioned: 1494

Government
  - Mayor: Jiří Kašpar

Area
  - Total: 33.85 km^{2} (13.07 sq mi)
- Elevation: 389 m (1,276 ft)

Population (2026-01-01)
  - Total: 8,148
  - Density: 240.7/km^{2} (623.4/sq mi)
- Time zone: UTC+1 (CET)
  - Summer (DST): UTC+2 (CEST)
- Postal codes: 415 01, 417 01 – 417 03
- Website: www.mesto-dubi.cz

Dubí (Czech pronunciation: [ˈdubiː]; German: Eichwald) is a spa town in Teplice District in the Ústí nad Labem Region of the Czech Republic. It has about 8,100 inhabitants. The town is located on the Bystřice Stream on the border between the Most Basin and Ore Mountains, near the border with Germany.

Dubí was founded as a mining settlement and there are still lignite deposits here. The main landmark of the town is the Church of the Immaculate Conception of the Virgin Mary.

== Administrative division ==
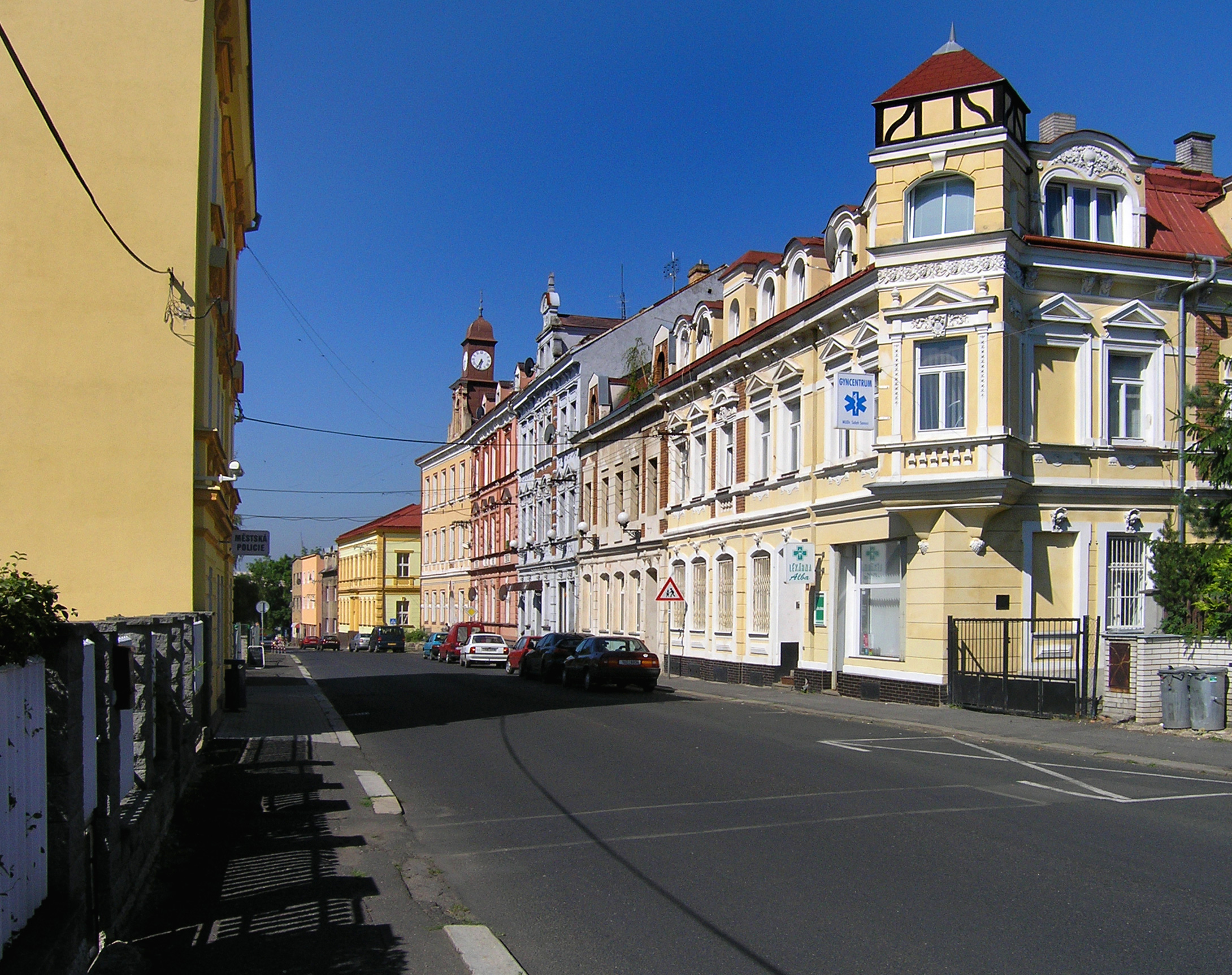
Pozorka, a part of Dubí

Dubí consists of seven municipal parts (in brackets population according to the 2021 census):

- Dubí (3,358)
- Běhánky (903)
- Bystřice (1,121)
- Cínovec (120)
- Drahůnky (325)
- Mstišov (563)
- Pozorka (1,170)

== Etymology ==
The name was derived from dub, i.e. 'oak'; the original German name Eichwald means 'oak forest'. Dubí was named after the extensive oak forests that grew here.

== Geography ==
Dubí is located about 5 kilometres (3 mi) northwest of Teplice and 16 km (10 mi) west of Ústí nad Labem. The municipal territory, specifically the village of Cínovec, is located on the Czech–German border. The southern part of the territory with most of the built-up area lies in the Most Basin and the northern part lies in the Ore Mountains. The highest point is the hill Cínovecký hřbet at 881 m (2,890 ft) above sea level. The Bystřice Stream flows through the town.

== History ==
The first written mentions of Dubí are from the period 1494–1498, when it was a mining settlement of tin miners. Later the town became famous for the production of glass and porcelain, and for spas.

=== Spa ===
The first spas in Dubí were built in 1860 under the management of Anton Tschinkel, the founder of a local porcelain factory. In 1862, his first spa (Diana's Spa) was opened. The present-day Theresa's Spa with mineral waters, recommended to patients after brain and spine surgeries, have been operating since 1879.

== Demographics ==
Historical population

Year	Pop.	±%
1869	4,431	—
1880	7,747	+74.8%
1890	11,521	+48.7%
1900	17,886	+55.2%
1910	18,825	+5.2%

Year	Pop.	±%
1921	17,506	−7.0%
1930	18,599	+6.2%
1950	10,634	−42.8%
1961	11,107	+4.4%
1970	9,412	−15.3%

Year	Pop.	±%
1980	9,160	−2.7%
1991	7,815	−14.7%
2001	7,630	−2.4%
2011	7,838	+2.7%
2021	7,560	−3.5%

Source: Censuses

== Economy ==
Europe's largest deposits of lithium-bearing mica zinnwaldite are located in the area of Cínovec. In April 2022, it was estimated to start the mining in 2025 at the earliest, but it remains uncertain whether the Czech Republic will decide on mining due to high environmental demands. As of 2026, the start of mining is still not being prepared.

== Transport ==
Dubí is an important transit point to Germany on the European route E55. The Cínovec / Altenberg and Cínovec / Zinnwald road border crossings are located within the municipal territory.

The scenic Most–Dubí–Moldava railway line passes through the town. It is a technical monument that was declared a cultural heritage in 1998.

== Sights ==
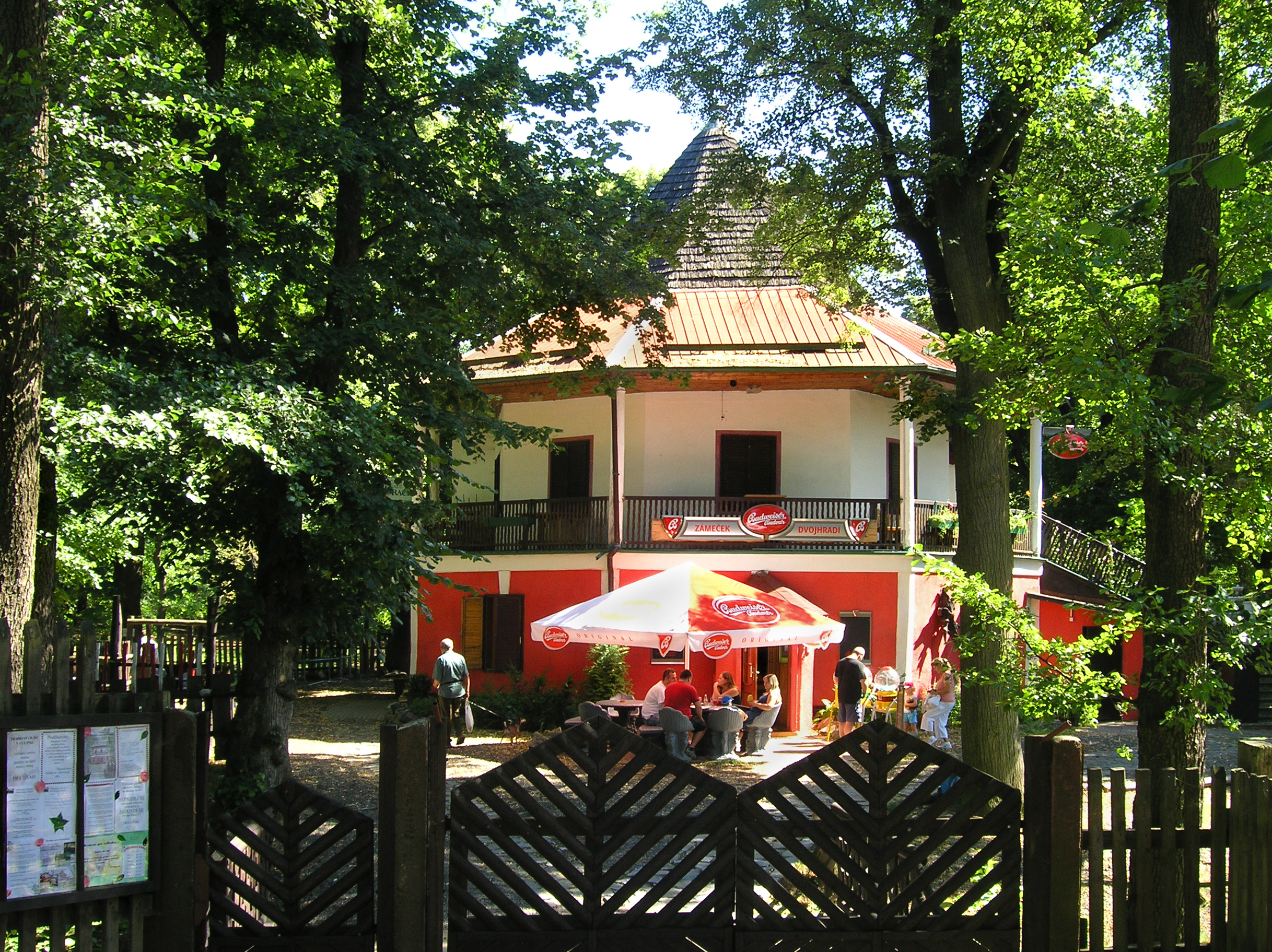
Dvojhradí hunting lodge

The most important sight in Dubí is the Church of the Immaculate Conception of the Virgin Mary, which was built on the order of princes Clary-Aldringen between 1898 and 1906 as a copy of the Venice church Madonna dell'Orto to serve as their family's church.

Dvojhradí is a hunting lodge in Mstišov, built in 1702–1703. It was completely reconstructed after a fire in 2018. It serves as a restaurant.

== Notable people ==
- Horst Seemann (1937–2000), German film director and screenwriter
- František Gregor Emmert (1940–2015), composer
- Helmut Novy (born 1944), German ice hockey player

== Twin towns – sister cities ==
Dubí is twinned with:

- Altenberg, Germany
- Arnstadt, Germany
- Bannewitz, Germany
