= Chad Emmert =

American songwriter and performer

Chad Bryant Emmert (born May 15, 1966, in Joplin, Missouri, United States) is an American songwriter and performer. He grew up in Kansas City, Missouri but moved to Seneca, Missouri in 1982, graduating from Seneca High School in 1984.

== Career ==
According to the American Society of Composers, Authors, and Publishers, Chad has twenty two songs published. Ten songs have been published by CBS Records, now owned by Sony Corporation of America, four songs by Mercy Records, and seven songs through Blendville/Universal.

Emmert has performed on seven albums. Marz X/Planet Appeal (1987), Marz X/End of the Line (1989), Grady/Domestic Blend (1994), Chad Emmert/17 Mile Drive (1998), Chad Emmert/When She's Gone She's Gone (2006), Chad Emmert/Live at the Hurricane (2008), Chad Emmert/El Muchacho Dañado (2011)

The Marz X album End of the Line was engineered by Grammy award winner Vance Powell.

In 1990, for 12 shows, Chad filled in on bass for the A and M recording artist Head East.

Emmert has performed at notable venues such as The Whiskey-a-Go-Go on Sunset Blvd. in Los Angeles, Hard Rock Cafe in Las Vegas, Margaritaville in Key West, SXSW in Austin, The EXPO Centre in Tulsa, The Roxy in Kansas City, among others.

Emmert's first band included Jack Lankford who later played bass for A Picture Made, Steve Ritter who later played drums for A Picture Made and The Connells, and soundman Vance Powell who later won a Grammy for best engineered album.

His songs written while in the band "Marz X" have now been sold by CBS to EMI New York. EMI now shares 50% percent of ownership with Chad Emmert.

Chad Emmert has currently retired from touring and owns and operates a music store called "G-strings and F holes Music Store" in Seneca, MO.

Chad is currently played with country singer Kimra who is signed to Winter Records In 2015–2016.

Chad Emmert is currently touring with his band under the name Emmert's Extravaganza playing the casino circuit.
