= Hawaii Route 61 =

State highway in Honolulu County, Hawaii, United States

Hawaii Route 61

Route information
- Maintained by HDOT
- Length: 10.8 mi (17.4 km)
- Existed: early 1950s–present

Major junctions
- South end: Route 98 in Honolulu
- H-1 in Honolulu
- North end: Hamakua Drive in Kailua

Location
- Country: United States
- State: Hawaii
- Counties: Honolulu

Highway system
- Routes in Hawaii
← Route 58	→ Route 63

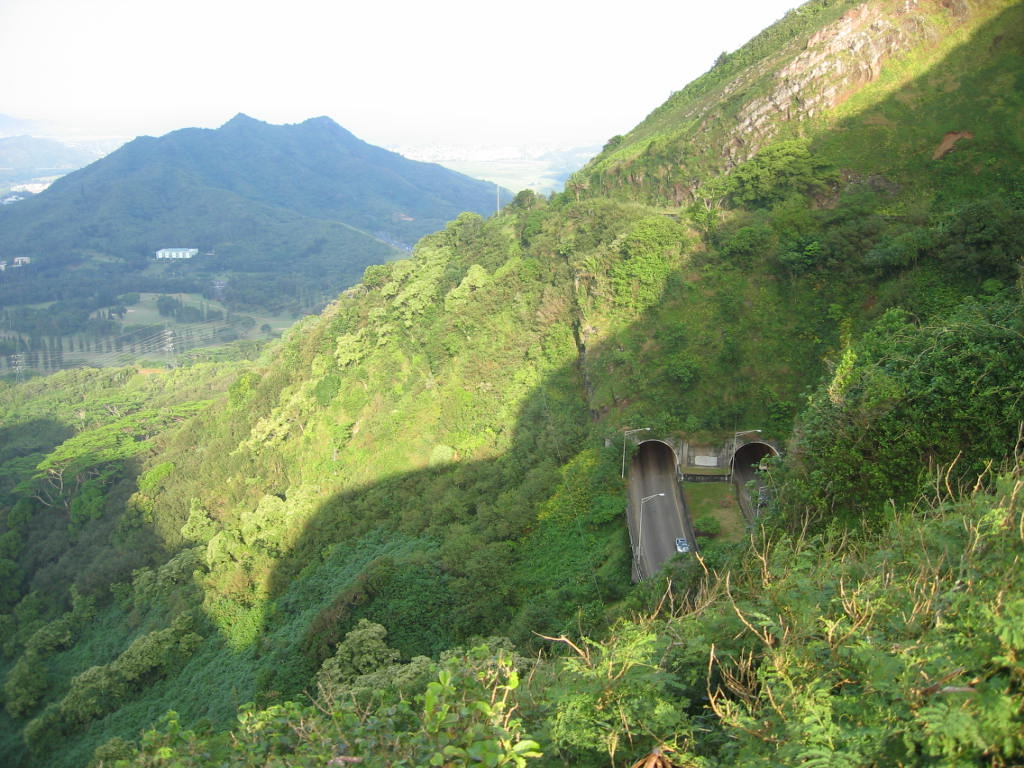
Highway 61 runs through the Nuʻuanu Pali Tunnels, as seen from the Old Pali Highway.

Hawaii Route 61, often called the Pali Highway, is in Honolulu County, Hawaii, United States, that is the main highway connecting downtown Honolulu with the windward side of Oʻahu island. From downtown, it traverses up Nuʻuanu Valley and the residential neighborhood of Nuʻuanu, passes through the Nuʻuanu Pali Tunnels, and descends to the major windward communities of Kāneʻohe (reached by Kamehameha Highway, State Route 83) and Kailua.

== History ==
The current Pali Highway is actually the third roadway to be built here. The original Pali "highway" went along much of the same route and portions of the old road still exist, although closed to vehicular traffic. When the current Pali Highway and its tunnels opened, the original roadway was closed and is now used by hikers. The "Old Pali Highway", as it is now called, is noted in the popular culture of Hawaii for being a place with strong spiritual connections. Many ghost stories have settings along this old highway. A large portion of the old highway was built over the ancient Hawaiian foot paths that traversed the famous Pali pass, which was the most easily accessible route to take from the Windward to Honolulu side. This was because much of the Koʻolau range on the Windward side has steep cliffs that make it nearly impossible to traverse over safely. "Pali" is the Hawaiian word for precipice.

The highway was mentioned as an "awe-inspiring drive" in Car and Driver's "10 Best Drivers' Cities."

== Points of interest ==
The lower mouth of Nuʻuanu valley is the site of historic Oahu Cemetery, founded in 1844. Over time it was expanded with the Royal Mausoleum of Hawaii in 1863, and the Kyoto Gardens of Honolulu Memorial Park. A few blocks to the east is the National Memorial Cemetery of the Pacific.

Hawaii Route 61 has several free scenic lookouts, including the Pali Lookout, which is notable for its strong winds that get amplified though the mountain's cliffs. The Queen Emma Summer Palace is also on the Pali (2913 Pali Hwy). The following foreign consulates are located on the Pali:

- Consulate General of Korea, 2756 Pali Hwy
- Consulate General of the Philippines, 2433 Pali Hwy
- Taipei Economic and Cultural Office, 2746 Pali Hwy

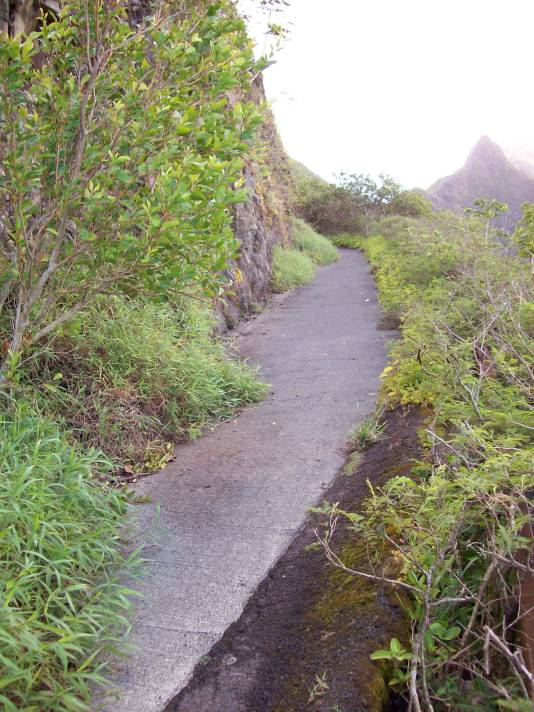
Decaying remains of the Old Pali Road

The Pali is also the site of the following houses of worship and religious originations:

- Bentenshu Hawaii Kyokai, 3871 Old Pali Rd
- Saint Stephen Diocesan Center (Roman Catholic), 6301 Pali Hwy
- First Unitarian Church of Honolulu, 2500 Pali Hwy
- Hawaii Conference of Seventh-day Adventists, 2728 Pali Hwy
- Honmon Butsuryushu Hawaii Mission, 3001 Pali Hwy
- Honpa Hongwanji Mission of Hawai'i Betsuin, 1727 Pali Hwy.
- Nuuanu Congregational Church, Pali Hwy
- St. Stephen Church (Roman Catholic), 2747 Pali Hwy
- Soka Gakkai Intl-USA, 2729 Pali Hwy
- Temple Emanu-El (reform), 2550 Pali Hwy
- Tenrikyo Hawaii Dendocho, 2920 Pali Hwy

== Names of State Route 61 ==
- "Fort Street" (at the intersection of Vineyard Boulevard)
- "Pali Highway" (from downtown Honolulu to Castle Junction near Maunawili)
- "Kalanianaʻole Highway" (from Castle Junction to Castle Medical Center in Kailua)
- "Kailua Road" (from Castle Medical Center to central Kailua)

== Major intersections ==
The entire route is in Honolulu County.

Location	mi	km	Destinations	Notes
Honolulu	0.0	0.0	Route 98 / Pali Highway (Route 7505)	
Honolulu	0.2	0.32	H-1 (Freeway) / Punchbowl Street	H-1 exit 21A-B; no access from Route 61 north to H-1 or H-1 west to Route 61 south
Honolulu			Pacific Heights Road (Route 7545) / Pauoa Road (Route 7521)	interchange
Honolulu			Nuuanu Avenue (Route 7522) / Wyllie Street (Route 7524)	interchange
Honolulu			Pali Lookout	interchange
Nu‘uanu Pali	5.7– 6.0	9.2– 9.7	Nuuanu Pali Tunnels	
	7.7	12.4	Route 83 west (Kamehameha Highway) – Kaneohe MCAS, Kaneohe	
Maunawili	9.5	15.3	Route 72 south – Waimanalo	
Kailua	10.6	17.1	Kailua Road (Route 6001) / Hamakua Drive (Route 6010)	
1.000 mi = 1.609 km; 1.000 km = 0.621 mi
