= František Gregor Emmert =

Czech composer (1940–2015)

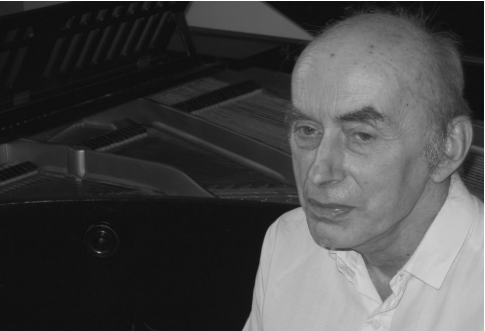
František Gregor Emmert in 2005

František Gregor Emmert (19 May 1940 – 17 April 2015) was a Czech composer of classical and incidental music.

== Biography ==
Emmert's ancestors came from the north of Bavaria, in the area around Weiden, Waldmünchen, and Ippesheim. Their history is documented in the local books until the beginning of the 17th century. Gregor Emmert, father of the composer, was born in Bavaria, and the Emmert family moved to Bohemia after World War I.

Emmert was born in Mstišov, today a part of Dubí near Teplice in North Bohemia. In 1954, he went to study in Prague. He graduated from High School of Music Education and went on to take classes at the Prague Conservatory in piano, under Lev Esch, and composition, privately under Jan Zdeněk Bartoš. Later he continued his composition studies at the Janáček Academy of Music and Performing Arts (JAMU) in Brno, under Jan Kapr and Miloslav Ištvan. After his graduation in 1975, he started to teach composition at JAMU himself.

As a Catholic, Emmert was never a member of the Communist Party of Czechoslovakia. He represented an alternative to the "Compositional School of Brno" (rationally and numerically composed music by Miloslav Ištvan and Alois Piňos), and many later Brno composers, including Pavel Zemek, cite him as an influence. In the 1970s, he became one of the key composers for the Husa na Provázku Theatre, where he composed an adaptation of Fyodor Dostoevsky's novel Demons. He also established himself as a composer of symphonic music, with 25 completed symphonies. His chamber and vocal music is inspired by the spiritual meaning of the Catholic Church and mysticism.

In 1991, he became a docent, and in 2006 was named a professor at JAMU. His composition classes were taken by many contemporary composers of artificial music, including Mojmír Bártek, Zoja Černovská, Afrodité Katmeridu, Pavel Malý, Martin Štědroň, Leoš Kuba, Mário Buzzi, Barbora Škrlová, Lenka Foltýnová, Ondřej Šárek, Jana Bařinková, Vojtěch Dlask, Tomáš Lučivjanský, Adrian Demoč, Vratislav Zochr, Jan Dobiáš, Irena Franková, Martina Kachlová, David Postránecký, Adrián Demoč and Tereza Zemanová. He was awarded many times for various compositions.

He died on 17 April 2015 in Brno.

His son František Emmert is a writer of non-fiction, with a focus on 20th century history.

== Style ==
Initially, Emmert's music was heavily inspired by spiritual German music with emphasis on traditional counterpoint. His early work, until 1975, is marked by avant-garde and its typical signs are aleatoric, multiserialism or timbre music. From the second half of the 1970s, he went back to his roots as his faith returned. His work was then marked by older compositional techniques and influences of the romanticism and medieval music (Guillaume de Machaut). His perception of postmodernism slightly differed from the standards; Emmert did not work with citations, he just arranged harmony. He was one of the first Czech composers who could be labelled as postmodernist. His later symphonies from the 21st century (Symphony No. 18 and after) are composed for large symphonic orchestras, usually scored in biform and polytempo for non-traditional instruments such as clarina and baritone oboe. These aspects mark Emmert's final stage of composition. Most of his symphonies are subtitled. Symphony No. 25 was the last of Emmert's work premiered, on 1 June 2017 in Brno, by the Ensemble Opera Diversa string orchestra, with soloists Milan Pal’a (viola), Marek Pal’a (organ) and Jarmila Balážová (mezzo-soprano), and conducted by Ondrej Olos.

== Selected works ==
=== Symphonies ===
Emmert finished 26 symphonies.

- Symphony No. 5 "Kosmické zvony" (Cosmic Bells) for soprano, male choir, tape recorder and orchestra (1971)
- Symphony No. 10 "Euanggelion" (1985)
- Symphony No. 12 "Veraikon" (1986)
- Symphony No. 16 "Útěcha zarmoucených" (Soothing The Saddened) for solo violin, two string quartets and two chamber orchestras (1990)
- Symphony No. 23 "Věčný Jeruzalém" (Jerusalem Eternal, 2004)

=== Chamber music ===
- Tamango (suite for string orchestra and timpani, 1962)
- Sonata for organ (1968)
- Trio for oboe, cello and piano (1985)
- Decimetto for brass instruments (1986)

=== Choral works ===
- Otče náš (Lord's Prayer, 1984)
- Magnificat (1985)
- Biblické písně (Biblical songs, 1986)
