= Kirk Emmert =

American political scientist

- Scientific career
- Institutions: Kenyon College, Bowdoin College

Kirk R. Emmert is an American political scientist and professor emeritus at Kenyon College where he was the Harry M. Clor Professor of Political Science. Before joining Kenyon College in 1978 he was a member of the White House staff of Gerald Ford and taught at Bowdoin College.

== Books ==
- Winston S. Churchill on Empire. Durham, NC: Carolina Academic Press, 1989
- The Political Thought of Winston Churchill, University of Chicago, Department of Political Science, 1963
