= František Emmert =

Czech historian and writer

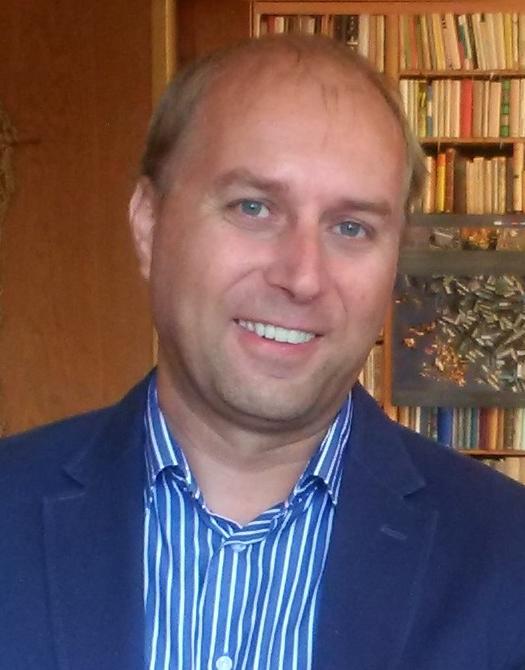
František Emmert in 2016

František Emmert (born 1974) is a Czech writer. He is an author of books about modern European and Czech history.

== Biography ==
František Emmert was born in 1974 in Brno, Czechoslovakia into the family of František Gregor Emmert, a music composer and professor at the Janáček Academy of Music and Performing Arts. His father's family came from the town of Weiden in Bavaria, and his mother's family from Teplice in Bohemia. His paternal ancestors worked for generations as glass makers on the German side of the Šumava Mountains (Bohemian Forest). His mother came from a family of traders who owned a family confectioner's shop in Teplice before 1948.

After graduating from high school, František Emmert initially began studying history, but ultimately completed a degree in law. In 2011 he obtained the title Doctor of law at the Faculty of Law of Charles University in Prague.

From 1992 to 2006 he worked as a journalist, broadcaster and book editor. He passed through Czech Radio, the newspapers Rovnost, Právo and ZNnoviny/Slovo and Czech News Agency. From 2009 to 2011 he worked as a spokesperson for the Supreme Administrative Court in Brno. Since 2013, he has been a research fellow at the Institute of [./Https://www.ilaw.cas.cz/ State and Law] of the Czech Academy of Sciences. In 2014 and 2015, he taught at the Faculty of Law of Palacky University in Olomouc, and in 2020 and 2021 at the Faculty of Law of Masaryk University in Brno.

He started writing books in 2001. His first two works of fiction were published in 2003 and 2004, and he then started writing non-fiction works about modern European and Czech history. In 2005 the Vyšehrad publishing house published his first non-fiction book, Czechs in the Wehrmacht, which was soon reprinted.

Many narrative publications followed - called museums in a book - that discuss the key events of the 20th century, focusing mainly on European and Czech history. These publications in large format differ from classical books due to their more elaborate graphic design and legibility of the texts. They contain a large number of photographs, and separately printed appendices - facsimiles of archival material and DVDs with contemporary radio broadcasts. They are used as teaching aids in schools. As of 2012, Emmert has released nine books of this sort, some of which have been reprinted, won awards or been translated into English (The Holocaust). The publication Fateful Eights in Our History was awarded the E. E. Kisch Prize by the Association of Writers in 2009.

Emmert is the author of more than thirty books, including technical legal literature. Many of his books have been published in multiple editions, while others have been translated into foreign languages or received prestigious awards. He is the co-author of a high school textbook on social science and an author of commentaries and journalistic contributions in the daily press and expert articles and studies in the domains of history, law and international politics in technical papers and in collections. He contributed as an expert adviser on the preparation of the 2011 Czech historical film Lidice.

== Books in Czech ==
- 2026 - Kronika druhé světové války (The Second World War: An Illustrated Chronicle)
- 2025 - Němci v českých zemích (Germans in the Czech Lands), muzeu in a book
- 2023 - České povstání v květnu 1945 (The Czech Uprising of May 1945), muzeum in a book
- 2021 - Havel
- 2020 - US Army v Československu (US Army in Czechoslovakia)
- 2019 - Moderní české dějiny (Modern Czech History)
- 2019 - Sametová revoluce: Cestě ke svobodě (Velvet Revolution: The Road to Freedom)
- 2018 - Československé legie v Rusku (The Czechoslovak Legion in Russia)
- 2018 - Zlomové osmičky 1918-1938-1948-1968 (Breakthrough eights 1918-1938-1948-1968)
- 2018 - Zrození republiky: Národní revoluce 1918 (The Birth of the Czechoslovak Republic: The National Revolution of 1918)
- 2017 - Tomáš Garrigue Masaryk: Myslitel a prezident (Tomas Garrigue Masaryk: Thinker and President)
- 2017 - Wehrmacht, in Dutch 2019
- 2016 - Zikmund a Hanzelka. S Tatrou kolem světa (Zikmund and Hanzelka: Around the World in a Tatra Car), bestseller
- 2016 - Německá okupace českých zemí (The German Occupation of the Czech Lands)
- 2016 - Státní občanství na území České republiky v minulosti a současnosti (Citizenship in the Czech Republic in the Past and the Present), scholarly monograph (law)
- 2015 - Mobilizace 1938: Chtěli jsme se bránit! (Mobilization in 1938: We Wanted to Defend Ourselves!)
- 2015 - Československý odboj za druhé světové války (The Czechoslovak Resistance during the Second World War)
- 2014 - Českoslovenští legionáři za první světové války (Czechoslovak Legionaries during the First World War), bestseller, 2nd edition 2024
- 2014 - TGM, 2nd edition 2020
- 2013 - Peklo na východní frontě (The Eastern Front), in Dutch 2020
- 2012 - Průvodce českými dějinami 20. století (Guidebook to Czech History of the 20th Century), bestseller, 2nd edition 2019
- 2012 - Václav Havel 1936-2011, bestseller, museum in a book
- 2012 - Československý zahraniční odboj za druhé světové války na Západě (The Czechoslovak Foreign Resistance Movement in the West in World War II), museum in a book
- 2011 - Česká republika a dvojí občanství (The Czech Republic and Dual Nationality), scholarly monograph (law), 2nd edition 2014
- 2009 - Sametová revoluce - Kronika pádu komunismu 1989 (The Velvet Revolution. The Chronicle of the Fall of Communism 1989), bestseller, museum in a book
- 2008 - Osudové osmičky v našich dějinách (Fateful Eights in Our History), museum in a book, bestseller, the book won the E. E. Kisch Award in 2009
- 2008 - 1918: Vznik ČSR (1918 The Creation of the Czechoslovak Republic), museum in a book
- 2008 - Atentát na Heydricha (The assassination of Heydrich), museum in a book, 2nd edition 2016
- 2008 - Češi u Tobruku (The Czechs at Tobruk), 2nd edition 2014
- 2007 - Rok 1968 v Československu (The Year 1968 in Czechoslovakia), museum in a book, 2nd edition 2017
- 2007 - Druhá světová válka: Češi a Slováci (The Second World War. Czechs and Slovaks), museum in a book
- 2006 - Holocaust (The Holocaust), bestseller, museum in a book, 2nd edition 2018, in English 2007, in Dutch 2019
- 2005 - Češi ve wehrmachtu (Czechs in the Wehrmacht), bestseller, 2nd edition 2013, 3nd edition 2014, in German 2021
- 2004 - The Millennium of False Prophets, adventure novella
- 2003 - Odmaturuj ze společenských věd! (Graduate! in social science), co-author, school textbook.
- 2003 - Oheň zapomenutých bohů (The Fire of Forgotten Gods), adventure novella, 2nd edition 2013, in English 2006

== Books in English, Dutch and German ==
- 2021 - Tschechen in der deutschen Wehrmacht (Czechs in the German Wehrmacht), in German
- 2020 - Het Oostfront 1941-1945 (The Eastern Front), in Dutch
- 2019 - De Wehrmacht 1935-1945 (Wehrmacht), in Dutch
- 2019 - De Holocaust (The Holocaust), in Dutch
- 2007 - The Holocaust, in English (for the Czech book market only)
- 2006 - The Fire of Forgotten Gods, in English

== Awards ==
- 2010 - E. E. Kisch Prize awarded by the Association of Writers for the book The Velvet Revolution. The Chronicle of the Fall of Communism 1989.
- 2009 - E. E. Kisch Grand Prize awarded by the Association of Writers for the book Fateful Eights in Our History.
- 2008 - The Prize of the 17th Fall Book Trade Fair in Havlíčkův Brod awarded to the book The Second World War. Czechs and Slovaks.
- 2007 - The Prize of the 18th Fall Book Trade Fair in Havlíčkův Brod awarded to the book The Holocaust.
