= Paul Emmert =

Swiss artist

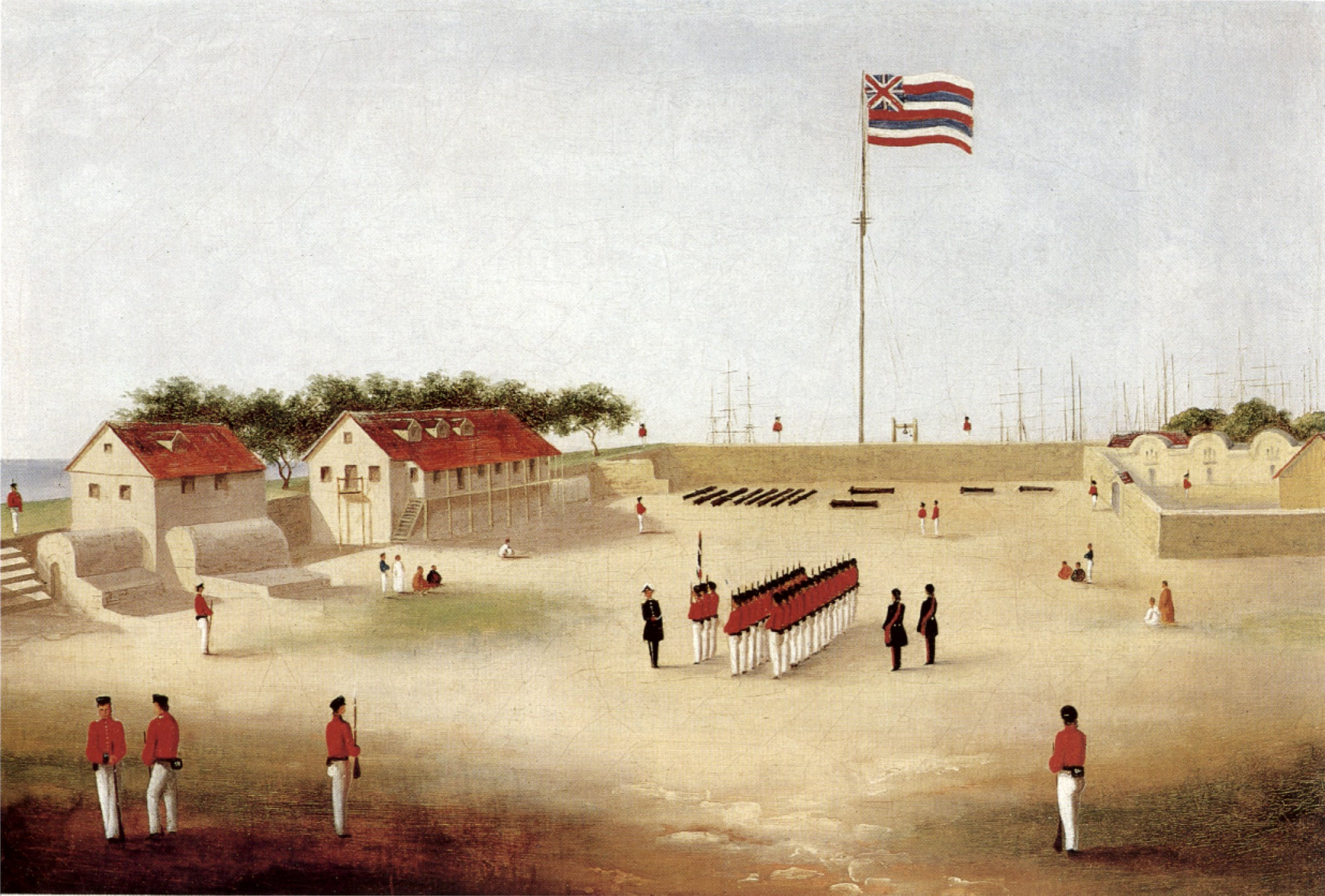
'View of the Honolulu Fort – Interior', oil on canvas painting by Paul Emmert, c. 1853, Hawaii Historical Society

Paul Emmert (1826–1867), who is also known as Paul Emert, was an artist born near Berne, Switzerland in 1826. He immigrated to New York City at age 19, where he rapidly became an established artist. He joined the gold rush to California in 1849. The following year he exhibited a panorama of the gold mining activities in Brooklyn, before making his second trip to California late in 1850. While in California, he operated the Bear Hotel in Sacramento and a theater in San Francisco. He exhibited his panorama in San Francisco and other communities.

In 1853, he moved to Hawaii, and opened a print shop in Honolulu, where he made prints after his own drawings of local landmarks. He moved to Kailua-Kona and farmed a sugarcane plantation where he resided until his death in 1867.

The Amon Carter Museum (Fort Worth, Texas), the Hawaii Historical Society and the Honolulu Museum of Art are among the public collections holding works by Paul Emmert.
