= Mauna Kea: Temple Under Siege =

2005 Hawaiian documentary film

Mauna Kea: Temple Under Siege is a 2005 documentary film directed by Joan Lander and Puhipau, collectively known as Nā Maka o ka ‘Āina a. The film documents the debate and opposition surrounding the Mauna Kea Observatories. The observatories were built on the dormant volcano Mauna Kea for having specific properties that were favorable for astronomers, but the mountain is also considered sacred land in Hawaiian religion.

In 2020, Mauna Kea: Temple Under Siege was selected for preservation in the United States National Film Registry of the Library of Congress for being "culturally, historically, or aesthetically significant".

== Overview ==
Mauna Kea: Temple Under Siege features many Hawaiian speakers, such as Kealoha Pisciotta, who is the president of Mauna Kea Anaina Hou, and Sam Ohu Gon III, a conservation biologist who explains how plants such as the Mauna Kea silversword have adapted to live on the mountain. Many representatives of the Royal Order of Kamehameha I are featured. The documentary also shows several meetings where astronomers discuss and debate with activists and locals that are opposed to future construction on the mountain. The film received funding from Pacific Islanders in Communications and Native American Public Telecommunications, with music for the film created by Brother Noland. The documentary aired on PBS in 2006.

== Reception ==
A review of the film from Cultural Survival wrote that the film "portrays the ongoing tensions between the Western scientific community's notion of progress and indigenous cultures' concept of the sacred." The film was also reviewed by The Contemporary Pacific.
