= Hawaii National Park =

Hawaii National Park may refer to:

- Hawaiʻi Volcanoes National Park, formerly part of Hawaii National Park
- Haleakalā National Park, formerly part of Hawaii National Park
