= Haleakala Trail =

Hiking trail in Hawaii, United States

The Haleakalā Trail (also sometimes known as the Haleakala Bridle Trail) is the historic public access route to Haleakalā Crater and the summit of Haleakalā, which are now part of Haleakalā National Park.

== Description ==
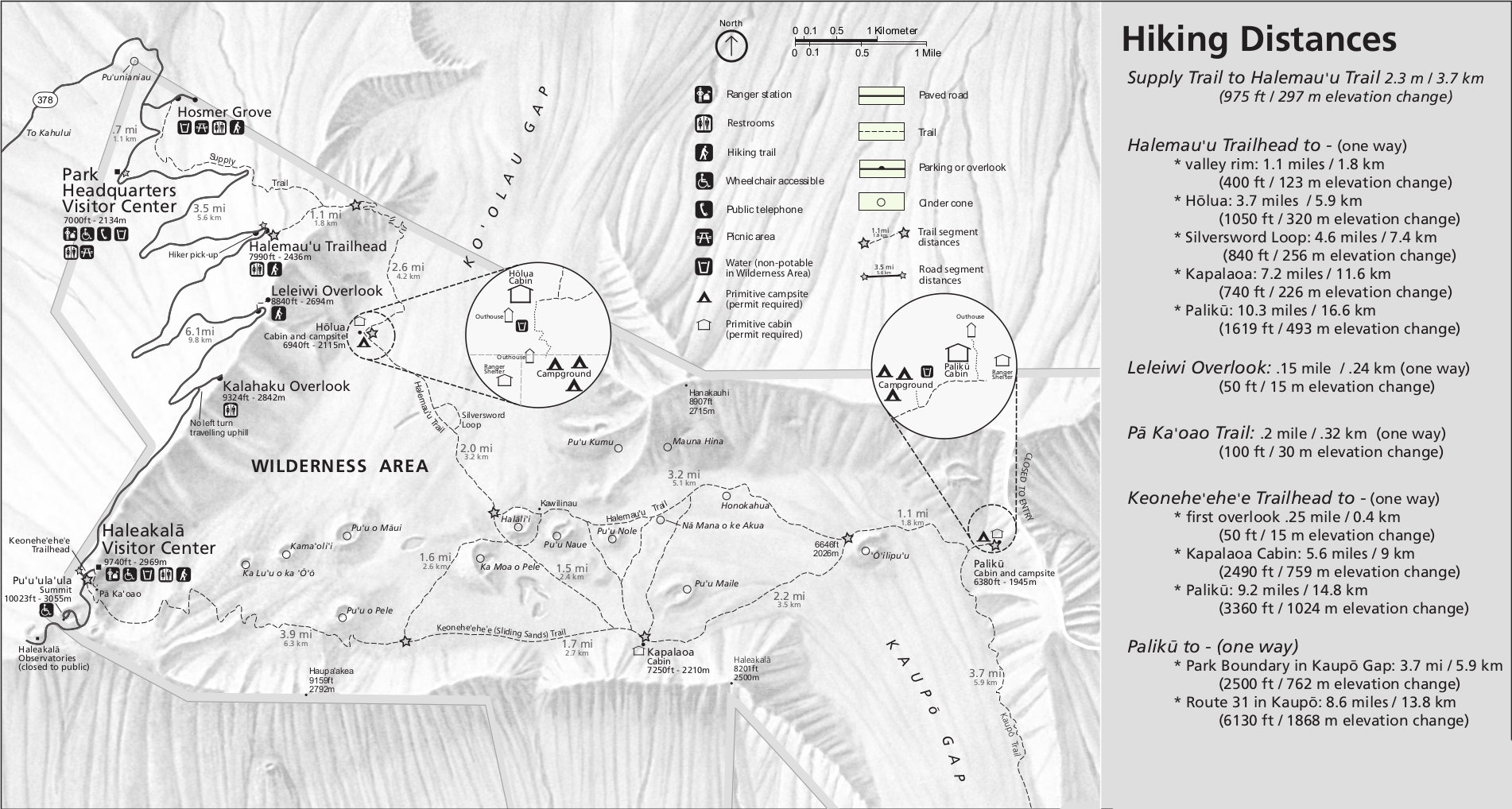
Map of Haleakala hiking trails, focusing on the summit caldera and showing mileages to trail junctions and cabins.

The historic Haleakala Trail is a path, approximately eight miles (13 km) in length, on a fifteen percent grade between Olinda, Maui, and the summit of Haleakala.

== History ==
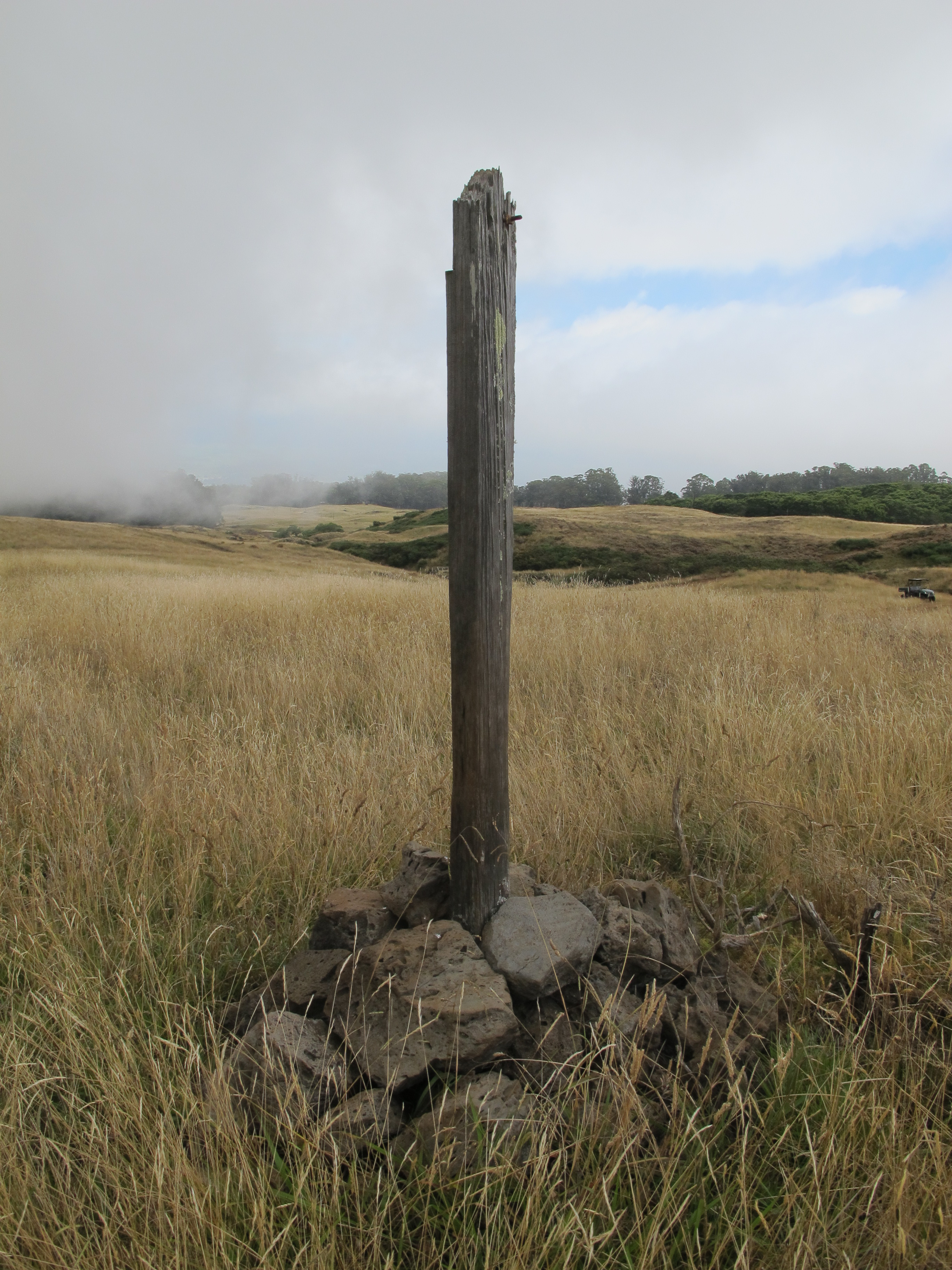
Guidepost erected in 1905

In 1828, the missionaries Lorrin Andrews, William Richards, and Jonathan Green, describe ascending Haleakala from the coast at Hamakuapoko (near modern day Paia), ascending a trail that was described by their Hawaiian guides as long but of easy descent.

Around 1888, the Kingdom of Hawaii improved Haleakala Trail in a public works project.

In 1905, the Territory of Hawai'i improved Haleakala Trail to accommodate in increase in tourism. The Maui News reported on November 4, 1905 that: "It will be of general interest to the people of the Islands to learn that the Haleakala trail is now completed to the top of the crater.". At this time, the trail was also marked by guideposts every 500 feet in order to assist travelers finding their way in the fog, which is a common occurrence in the area.

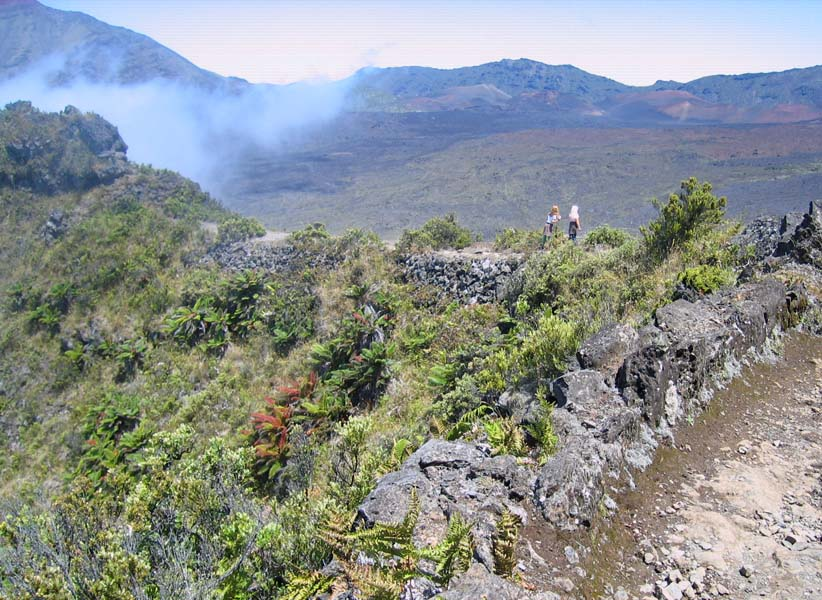
A view of the Haleakala Crater from the trail. Here, the trail crosses Rainbow Bridge.

In 1935, with the completion of State of Hawaii road 378, the current access to Haleakalā National Park, the Haleakala Trail fell into disuse. However, as late as 1972, Haleakala Trail continued to be in use as a horse trail.

In 2014, the portion of the Haleakala Trail that traverses land owned by Haleakala Ranch Company was the subject of a jury trial before the Second Circuit Court of the State of Hawaii. After a six-week trial, the jury determined that the State of Hawaii, not Haleakala Ranch Company, owned the trail. The jury found that Haleakala Trail is a public trail protected under the Highways Act of 1892 and that it is the successor to the ancient trail that existed before the Mahele land division of 1848, when all land in Hawaii was in the public domain. The jury decision largely relied on the expert report and testimony of surveyor Anthony Crook, who used numerous historic maps, public records of property transfers and grants of easements, and significant field work to determine the location of the historic Haleakalā Trail, including where it crossed important topographic landmarks such as Kailua Gulch which he found to have two potential routes across that are both "passable by pedestrian or horse."Expert Report of Surveyor Anthony Crook w/ Exhibits

== See also ==
- Haleakalā National Park – National park in Hawaii, United States
- Haleakala Wilderness – National park in Hawaii, United States
