= Opposition to the Maunakea Observatories =

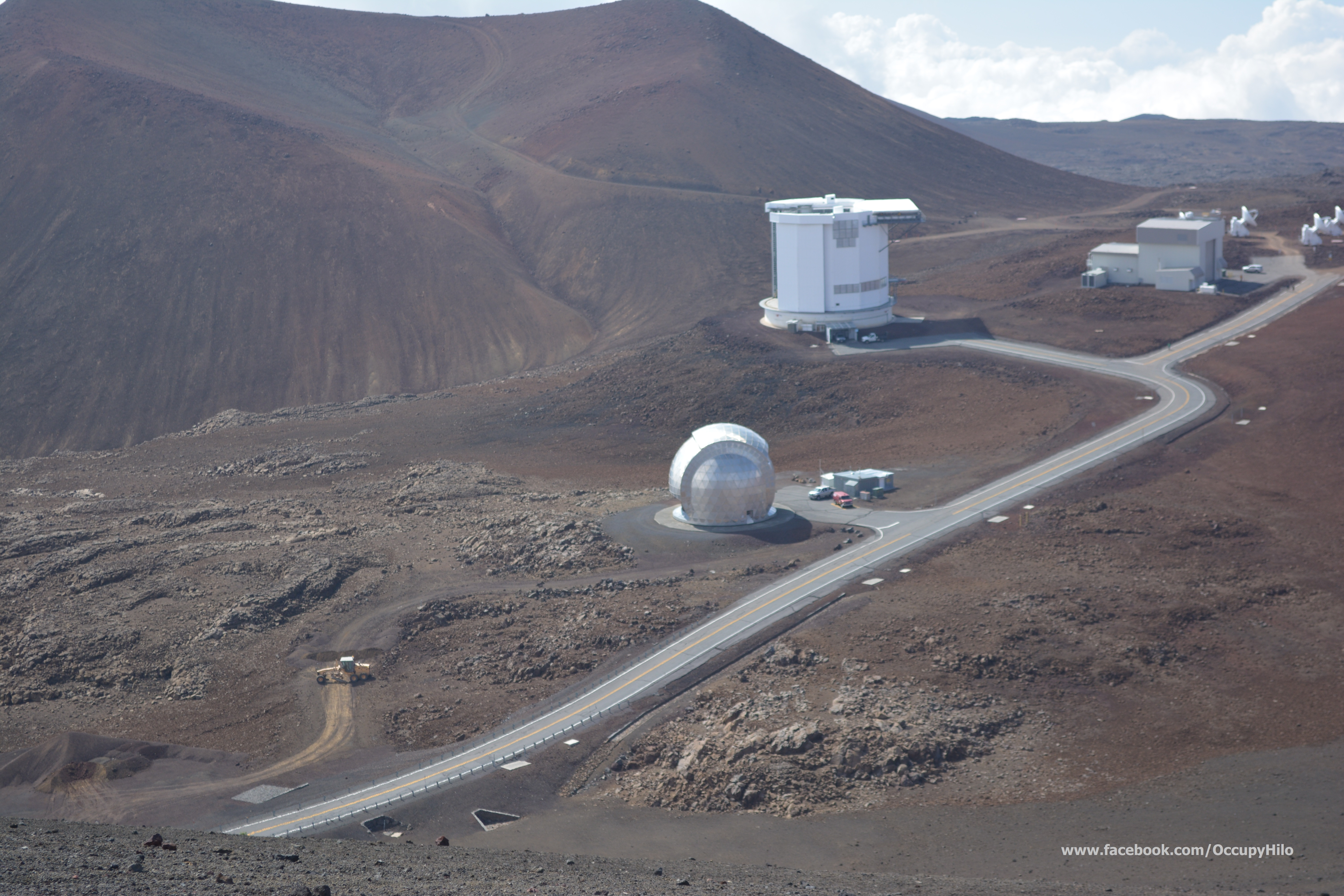
Three of Mauna Kea's existing telescopes: the Caltech Submillimeter Observatory (foreground), the James Clerk Maxwell Telescope (middle distance), and the Submillimeter Array (background)

The Maunakea Observatories have been controversial since the first telescope was built in the late 1960s. Originally part of research begun by Gerard Kuiper of the University of Arizona, the site has expanded into the world's largest observatory for infrared and submillimeter telescopes. Opposition to the telescope from residents in the city of Hilo, Hawaii were concerned about the visual appearance of the mountain and Native Hawaiians voiced concerns over the site being sacred to the Hawaiian religion as the home of several deities. Environmental groups and activists have been expressing concern over endangered species habitat.

The Outrigger Telescopes Project, intended to build from four to six comparatively small telescopes for interferometry, was to surround the Keck telescopes. It was cancelled in 2006, after a court found NASA's Environmental Impact Statement was improperly limited to just the telescope area.

An ongoing proposal for one of the world's largest optical telescopes, the Thirty Meter Telescope (TMT) was the focus of protests concerning the continued development of the mountain Hawaiians consider the most sacred peak in the island chain. The telescope has still not been built as of 2025, and its future is in jeopardy.

== Background ==
After studying photos for NASA's Apollo program that contained greater detail than any ground-based telescope, Gerard Kuiper began seeking an arid site for infrared studies. While he first began looking in Chile, he also made the decision to perform tests in the Hawaiian Islands. Tests on Maui's Haleakalā were promising but the mountain was too low in the inversion layer and often covered by clouds. On the "Big Island" of Hawaii, Mauna Kea is considered the highest island mountain in the world. While the summit is often covered with snow the air itself is extremely dry. Kuiper began looking into the possibility of an observatory on Mauna Kea. After testing, he discovered the low humidity was perfect for infrared signals. He persuaded then-Governor John A. Burns to bulldoze a dirt road to the summit where he built a small telescope on Puʻu Poliʻahu, a cinder cone peak. The peak was the second highest on the mountain with the highest peak being holy ground, so Kuiper avoided it. Next, Kuiper tried enlisting NASA to fund a larger facility with a large telescope, housing and other needed structures. NASA, in turn decided to make the project open to competition. Professor of physics, John Jefferies of the University of Hawaii placed a bid on behalf of the university. Jefferies had gained his reputation through observations at Sacramento Peak Observatory. The proposal was for a two-meter telescope to serve both the needs of NASA and the university. While large telescopes are not ordinarily awarded to universities without well established astronomers, Jefferies and UH were awarded the NASA contract, infuriating Kuiper who felt that "his mountain" had been "stolen" from "him". Kuiper would abandon his site (the very first telescope on Mauna Kea) over the competition and begin work in Arizona on a different NASA project. After considerable testing by Jefferies' team, the best locations were determined to be near the summit at the top of the cinder cones. Testing also determined Mauna Kea to be superb for nighttime viewing due to many factors including the thin air, constant trade winds and being surrounded by sea. Jefferies would build a 2.24 meter telescope with the State of Hawaii agreeing to build a reliable, all weather roadway to the summit. Building began in 1967 and first light seen in 1970.

== Expansion renews opposition ==
Some of the people on the Big Island were concerned that the whole thing had got out of hand and the University of Hawaii was going to take over the top of the mountain, push all the skiers off and push all the hunters off, and essentially develop, in the worst sense, the side of the mountain. The Big Island is a rural community and there are a lot of people there who are not very sophisticated, as you know. They are nervous about changes in lifestyles, and they see those following on the development of the program of astronomy as just about as far removed from their daily pursuits as they possibly can be. And they do not trust the University, State, or Federal government worth a damn.

They feel—and in some cases I’ve had this said to me—that they are going to lose all access to the mountain because of these programs. The Federal government is going to come in and it's going to slowly move down the mountain, taking more and more of the mountain over as more and more programs go up there, and no-one will be able to get there. It is very hard to fight a fear of this kind—a formless, baseless concern—except through the same kind of backwoods interaction, at a grassroots level.

— John Jefferies, Hawaii Institute for Astronomy, 1977

In Honolulu, the governor and legislature, enthusiastic about the development, set aside an even larger area for the observatory causing opposition in the main city of the Big Island, Hilo. Native Hawaiians believe the entire site to be sacred and that developing the mountain, even for science, would spoil the area. Environmentalists were concerned about rare native bird populations and other citizens of Hilo were concerned about the sight of the domes from the city. Using town hall meetings, Jefferies was able to overcome opposition by weighing the economic advantage and prestige the island would receive.

There has been substantial opposition to the Maunakea Observatories that continues to grow. By 1977 Jefferies stated that the Mayor of Hawaii County had joined existing hunting and environmentalist opposition. Over the years, the opposition to the observatories may have become the most visible example of the conflict western science has encountered over access and use of environmental and culturally significant sites. Opposition to development grew shortly after expansion of the observatories commenced. Once access was opened up by the roadway to the summit, skiers began using it for recreation and objected when the road was closed as a precaution against vandalism when the telescopes were being built. Hunters voiced concerns, as did the Hawaiian Audubon Society, which was supported by Governor George Ariyoshi.

The Audubon Society objected to further development on Mauna Kea over concerns to habitat of the endangered palila, an endemic species to only specific parts of this mountain. The bird is the last of the finch billed honeycreepers existing on the island. Over 50% of native bird species had been killed off due to loss of habitat from early western settlers, or the introduction of non-native species competing for resources. Hunters and sportsmen were concerned that the hunting of feral animals would be affected by the telescope operations. A "Save Mauna Kea" movement was inspired by the proliferation of telescopes, with opposition believing development of the mountain to be sacrilegious. Native Hawaiian non-profit groups, such as Kahea, (whose goals are the protection of cultural heritage and the environment), oppose development on Mauna Kea as a sacred space to the Hawaiian religion. Today, Mauna Kea hosts the world's largest location for telescope observations in infrared and submillimeter astronomy. The land itself is protected by the U.S. Historical Preservation Act due to its significance to Hawaiian culture, but this still allowed development.

== Outrigger telescopes ==
Development of the Maunakea Observatories is still opposed by environmental groups and Native Hawaiians. A 2006 proposal for the Outrigger Telescopes to become extensions of the Keck Observatory was canceled after a judge's determination that a full environmental impact statement must be prepared before any further development of the site. The "outrigger" smaller telescopes would have been linked to the main Keck I and Keck II telescopes. Environmental groups and Native Hawaiian activists were much stronger in their opposition this time than they had been in the past, but NASA went ahead with the proposal for lack of an alternate site. The group Mauna Kea Anaina Hou made several arguments against the development, including that Mauna Kea was a sacred mountain to Native Hawaiians where many deities live, and that the cinder cone location being proposed was holy in Hawaiian tradition as a burial site for a demi-god. The group raised several other concerns, such as environmental, concern for the preservation of native insects, the question of Ceded lands, and an audit report critical of the mountain's management.

== Thirty Meter Telescope proposal ==
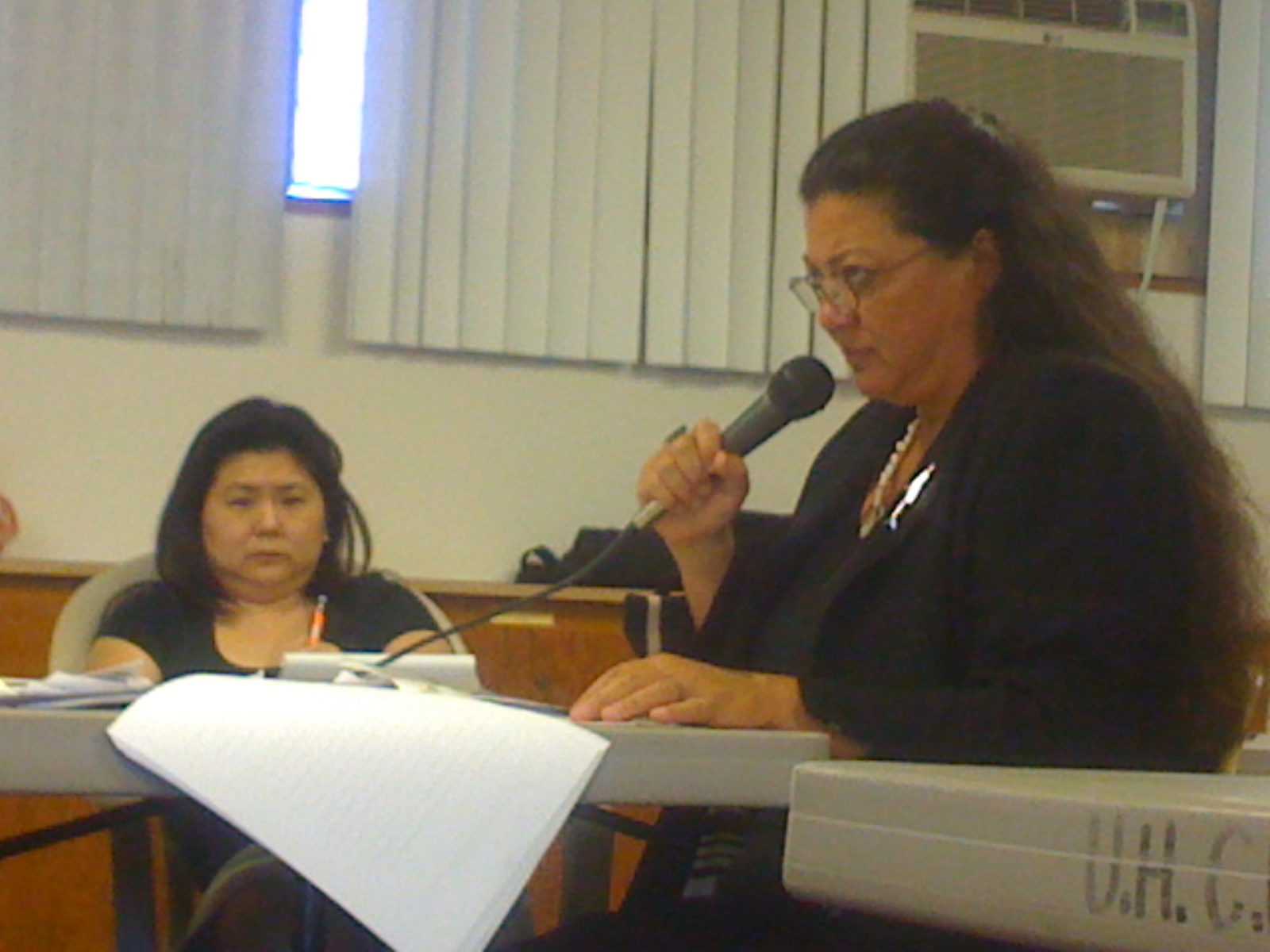
Kealoha Pisciotta, a former Maunakea Observatories employee, testifies at a State hearing in 2011.

The Thirty Meter Telescope (TMT) is a proposal for a large, segmented, mirror telescope, planned for the summit of Mauna Kea. The TMT has become a focal point for protests against further development of the observatory site, and a legal battle was fought through the Hawaii court system. The Supreme Court of Hawaii approved the resumption of construction of the telescope on 31 October 2018.

The TMT project is a response to a recommendation in 2000 from the US National Academy of Sciences that a thirty-meter telescope be the top priority and be built within the decade. Urgency in construction is due to the competitive nature of science with the European-Extremely Large Telescope also under construction. Mauna Kea's summit is the most sacred of all the mountains in Hawaii to many, but not all, Native Hawaiian people. Hawaiian cultural practitioners cite impacts to indigenous cultural practice, while recreational users have argued that construction harms the scenic view plane. Some environmentalists are concerned that irreparable ecological damage may be done by construction, although this has been disputed by other environmental advocates. All three groups are represented among the petitioners opposing the TMT. According to the State of Hawaii law HAR 13-5-30, the eight key criteria must be met before construction be allowed on conservation lands in Hawaii. Among other criteria, the development may not "cause substantial adverse impact to existing natural resources within the surrounding area, community, or region," and the "existing physical and environmental aspects of the land must be preserved or improved upon."

Native Hawaiian activists such as Kealoha Pisciotta, a former employee of the Maunakea Observatories, have raised concerns over the telescopes on Mauna Kea desecrating what some Native Hawaiians consider to be their most sacred mountain. Pisciotta, a former telescope systems specialist technician at James Clerk Maxwell Telescope, is one of several people suing to stop the construction, and is also director of Mauna Kea Anaina Hou. As of April 2015, two separate appeals were still pending.

The 1998 study Mauna Kea Science Reserve and Hale Pohaku Complex Development Plan Update stated that "...nearly all the interviewees and all others who participated in the consultation process (Appendices B and C) called for a moratorium on any further development on the summit of Mauna Kea."

The Hawaii Board of Land and Natural Resources gave final approval for the project in September 2017 after a protracted hearing process that included a six month long contested case hearing. This decision was challenged in the Hawaii State Supreme Court the following year. The court ruled that the DLNR decision was valid and that construction may proceed.

As of late 2021 construction of the Thirty Meter Telescope remained paused due to the controversy and ongoing effects of the COVID-19 pandemic. The 2020 Decadal report of the National Science Foundation has recommended federal investment in the TMT project. The controversy surrounding construction of the Thirty Meter Telescope continues. Independent polls commissioned by local media organizations show consistent support for the project in the islands with over two thirds of local residents supporting the project. These same polls indicate Native Hawaiian community support remains split with about half of Hawaiian respondents supporting construction of the new telescope.

In June 2025 the United States' National Science Foundation dropped support for the TMT in favor of the Giant Magellan Telescope. This lack of funding puts the TMT's future in doubt, although the scientists in the TMT international consortium said they would press forward.

== Stewardship change ==
A July 2022, state law responds to the protests by removing sole control over the master land lease from the University of Hawaii. After a joint transition period from 2023 to 2028, control will shift to the new Mauna Kea Stewardship and Oversight Authority, which will include representatives from the University, astronomers and native Hawaiians.
