= Kīpahulu, Hawaii =

Unincorporated community in Hawaii, United States

Kīpahulu
- Ancient district of Kīpahulu

- Location within Hawaii

Kīpahulu (Hawaiian for ' fetch [from] exhausted gardens') is an unincorporated community in the Hāna district of southeastern Maui, Hawaiʻi.

== Geography ==
Kīpahulu is located south of Hana and east of Kaupo. The only land access to the area is from the north by Hana Highway driving about 45 minutes past Hana or from the west by Highway 31 (Piʻilani Highway). Piʻilani Highway is the only major road in Kīpahulu and all populated areas are located along it.

== Services ==
Kīpahulu has no electric or water utilities. The only public utility is telecommunications. Water is obtained from streams flowing down Haleakalā. These services are provided by private water systems.

== History ==
The first written description of Kīpahulu was made by Jean-François de Galaup in 1786 while sailing along the southeast coast of Maui in search of an anchorage:

I coasted along its shore at a distance of a league (three miles) …. We beheld water falling in cascades …. The inhabitants, which are so numerous that a space of 3–4 leagues may be taken for a single village. The huts are on the coast so that the habitable part of the island is less than one half of a league. After passing Kaupō no more waterfalls are seen, and villages are fewer.

Kīpahulu lowlands were once heavily populated. The area hosted hundreds of farm sites and agricultural terraces. It was formerly the center of one of the old land districts (moku). In coastal area surveys, over 700 archeological features were documented in the 2,008 acres (8.1 km^{2}) surveyed. The features consist of stone mounds, walls and earthen terraces.

Coastal villages consisted of housing clusters for extended families (Hawaiian: ʻohana) and included living quarters, cook houses, and sheds used for work, storage, and canoes. More dwellings, used occasionally, were located farther upland throughout the cultivated area. All structures were single story, one room wood-frame buildings with thatched walls and roofs. Small stone shrines were associated with village sites.

With the advent of the whaling industry on the island in the 1880s Kīpahulu's population started to decline as people moved to main whaling ports such as Lahaina.

In the early 1900s, one of the regular ports of call for the Inter-Island Steam Navigation Company was Kīpahulu. Steamships provided passenger service around Maui and between the islands. Kīpahulu Landing allowed growers and ranchers to ship their goods to markets. The Kīpahulu Landing is private, and protected by The Nature Conservancy.

The highway was closed from 2006 to 2008 due to earthquake damage.

The grave of aviator Charles Lindbergh is on the grounds of Palapala Hoʻomau Church.

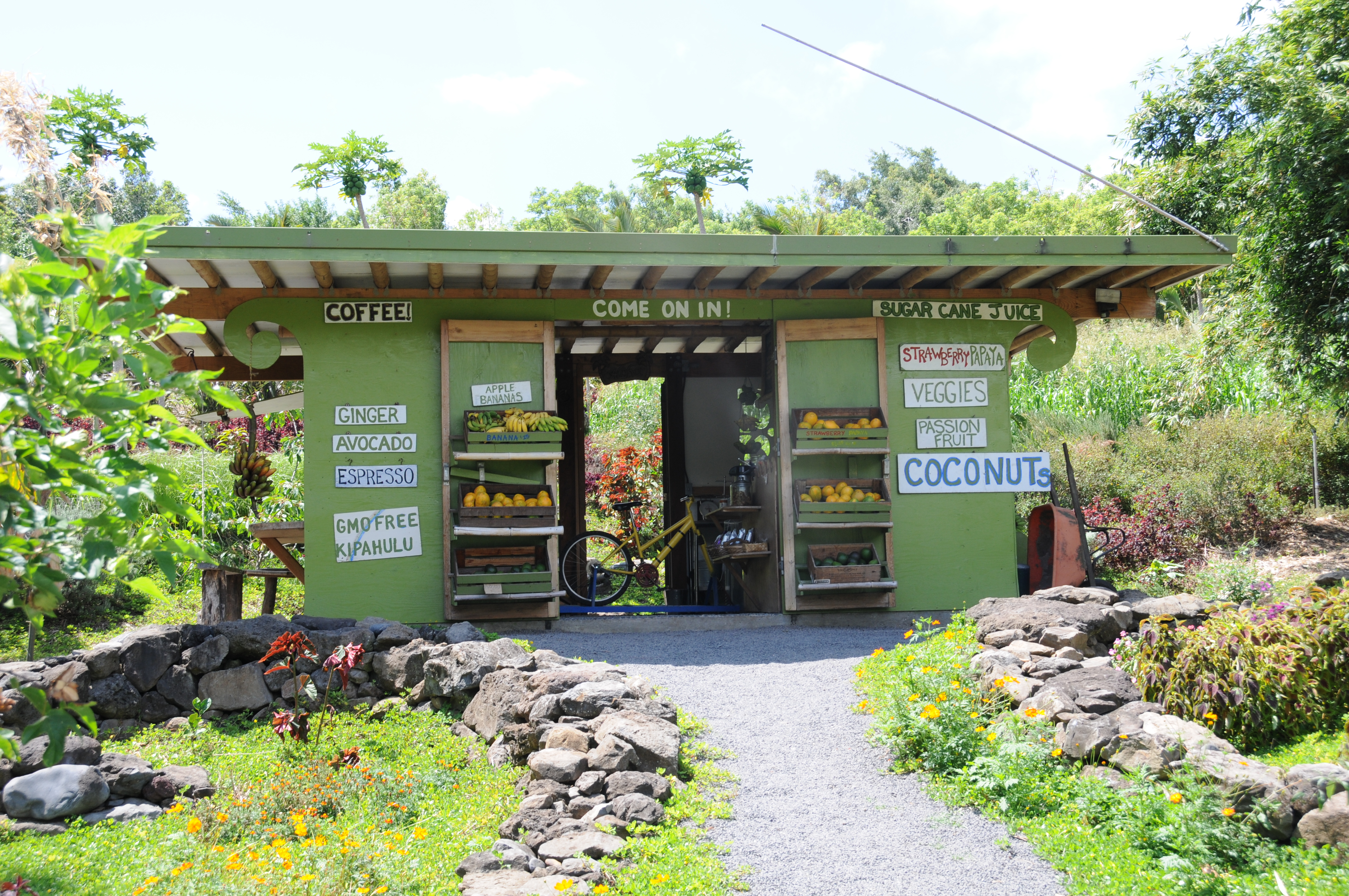
Laulima Fruit Stand

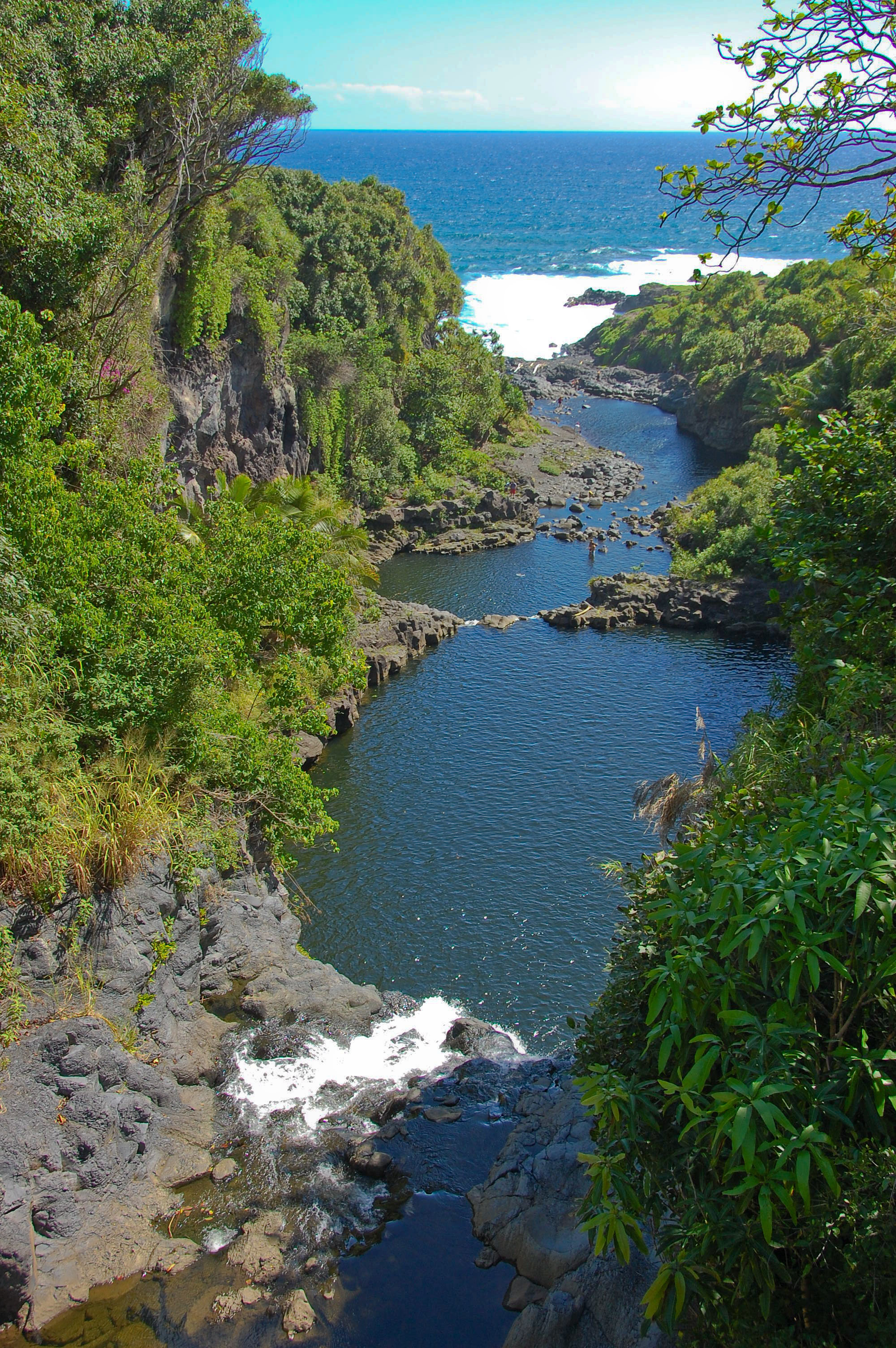
Pools in ʻOheʻo Gulch

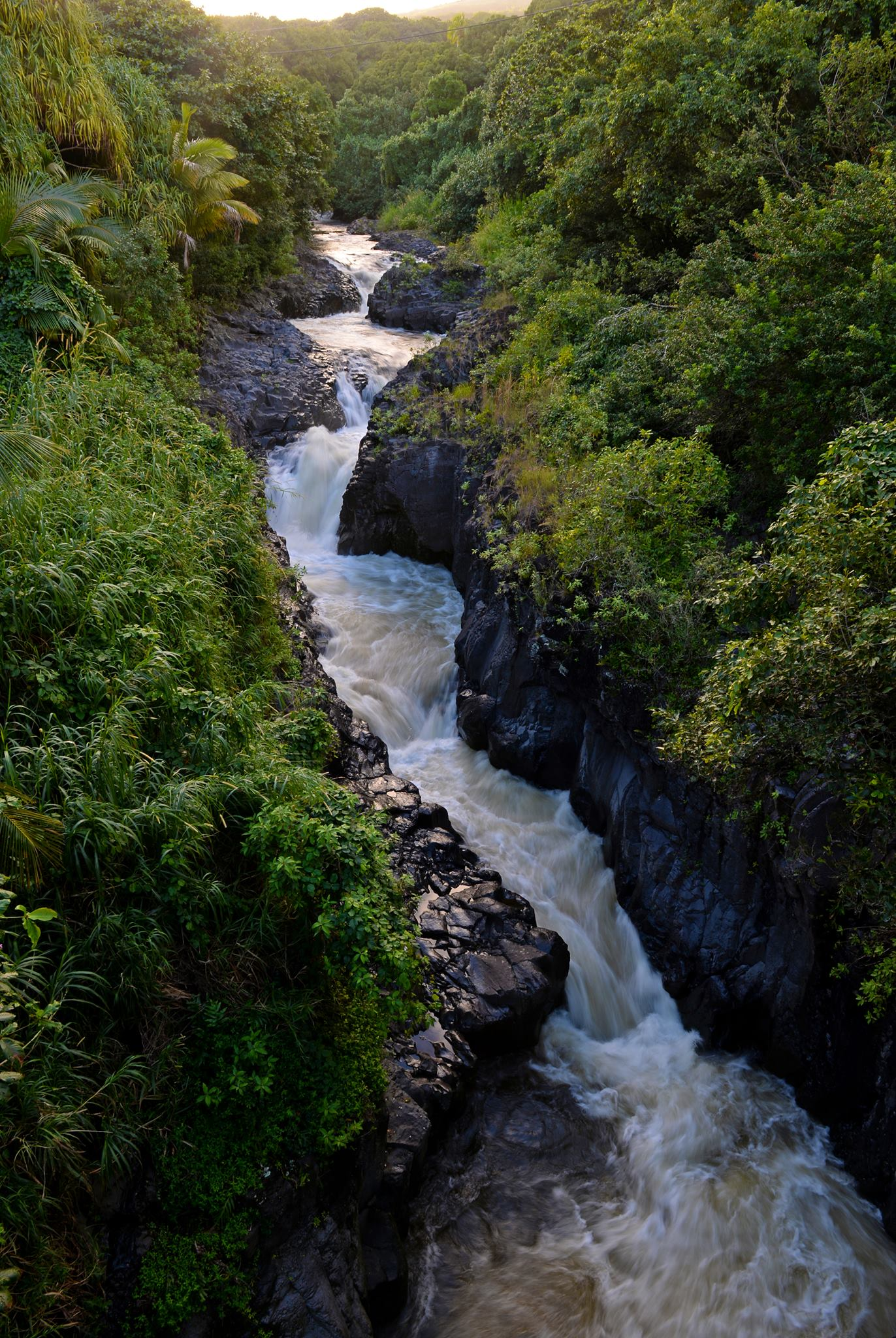
The Seven Sacred Pools

== Haleakalā National Park ==
Haleakalā National Park was established as a separate unit of the National Park System in 1960 (it was previously joined with Hawaiʻi National Park on Hawaiʻi Island). At the time, the park only consisted of the crater area of Haleakalā. On March 26, 1951, Kīpahulu Valley was added to the park as Kīpahulu Biological Reserve to protect endangered ecosystems. On January 10, 1969, HNP boundaries were expanded to include the Kīpahulu coastal area of ʻOheʻo.

Access in the Kīpahulu Biological Reserve is limited to researchers and managers.

The ʻOheʻo region of the park is open for recreation. Attractions include the ʻOheʻo Pools, often called the "Seven Sacred Pools". Swimming is not allowed in the park. A car-accessible campground requires reservations. Pipiwai hiking trail leads to 400-foot (120 m) Waimoku Falls.

== Kīpahulu Forest Reserve ==
The Kīpahulu Forest Reserve was established by Governor's Proclamation on August 20, 1914, to protect watersheds and streams that supplied local loʻi kalo (taro farms) and Kīpahulu Sugar Plantation. It is managed by the Hawaii Division of Forestry and Wildife.

The reserve spans 2,389.3 acres (966.9 ha) on the leeward slopes of Haleakalā. The reserve was originally a contiguous area, but tracts were removed from it, creating four separate tracts in three ahupua‘a: Naholoku (2,176.6 acres (880.8 ha)), Kukuiʻula (91.5 acres (37.0 ha) and 27.1 acres (11.0 ha)), and Kīkoʻo (94.1 acres (38.1 ha)). Management is focused on Naholoku. The other three sections are small; two are difficult to access. In 2024, five ʻalalā were released with a ceremony.
