= Pools of ʻOheʻo =

Lakes in Hawaii

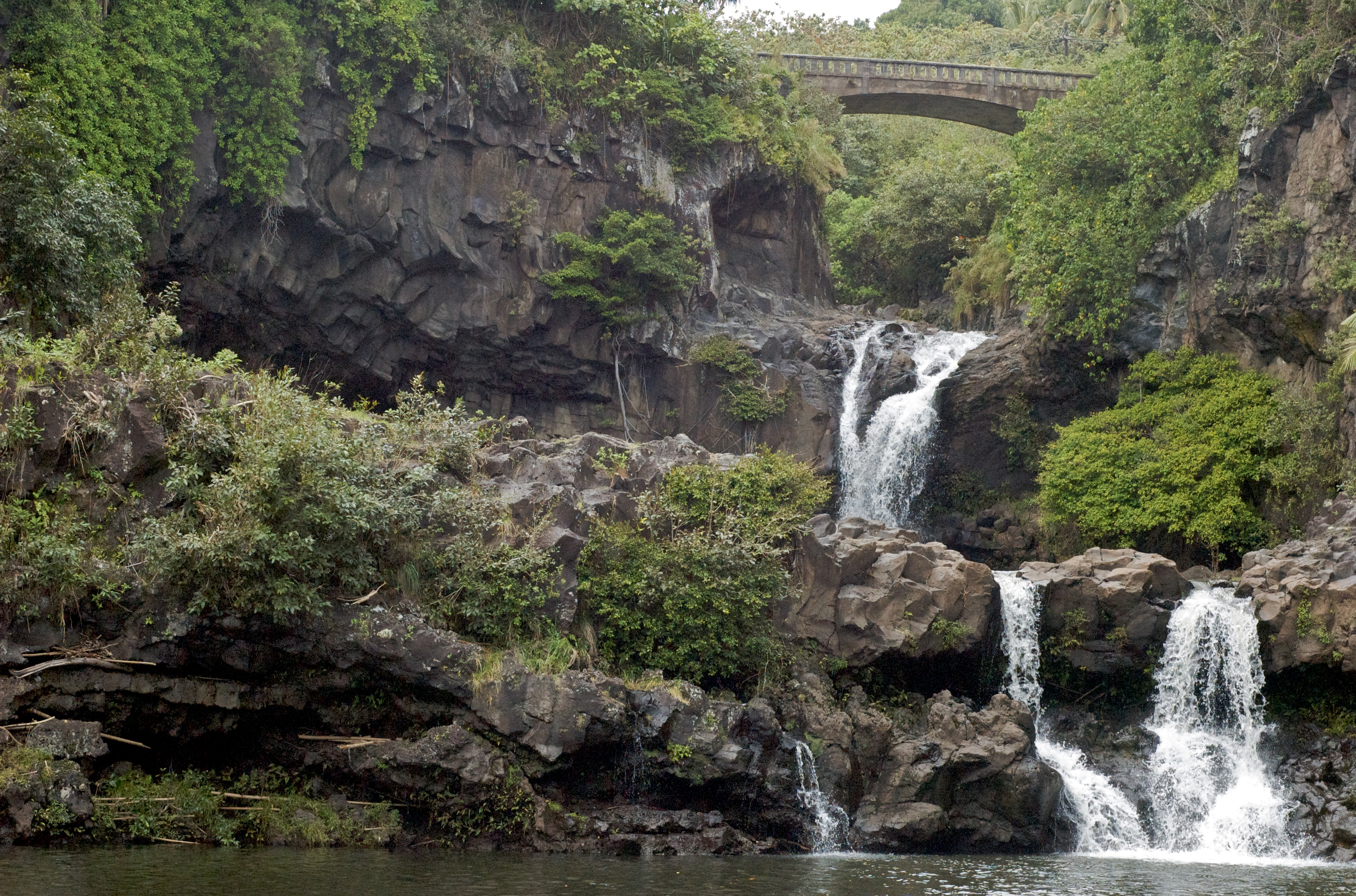
- The pools in 2008

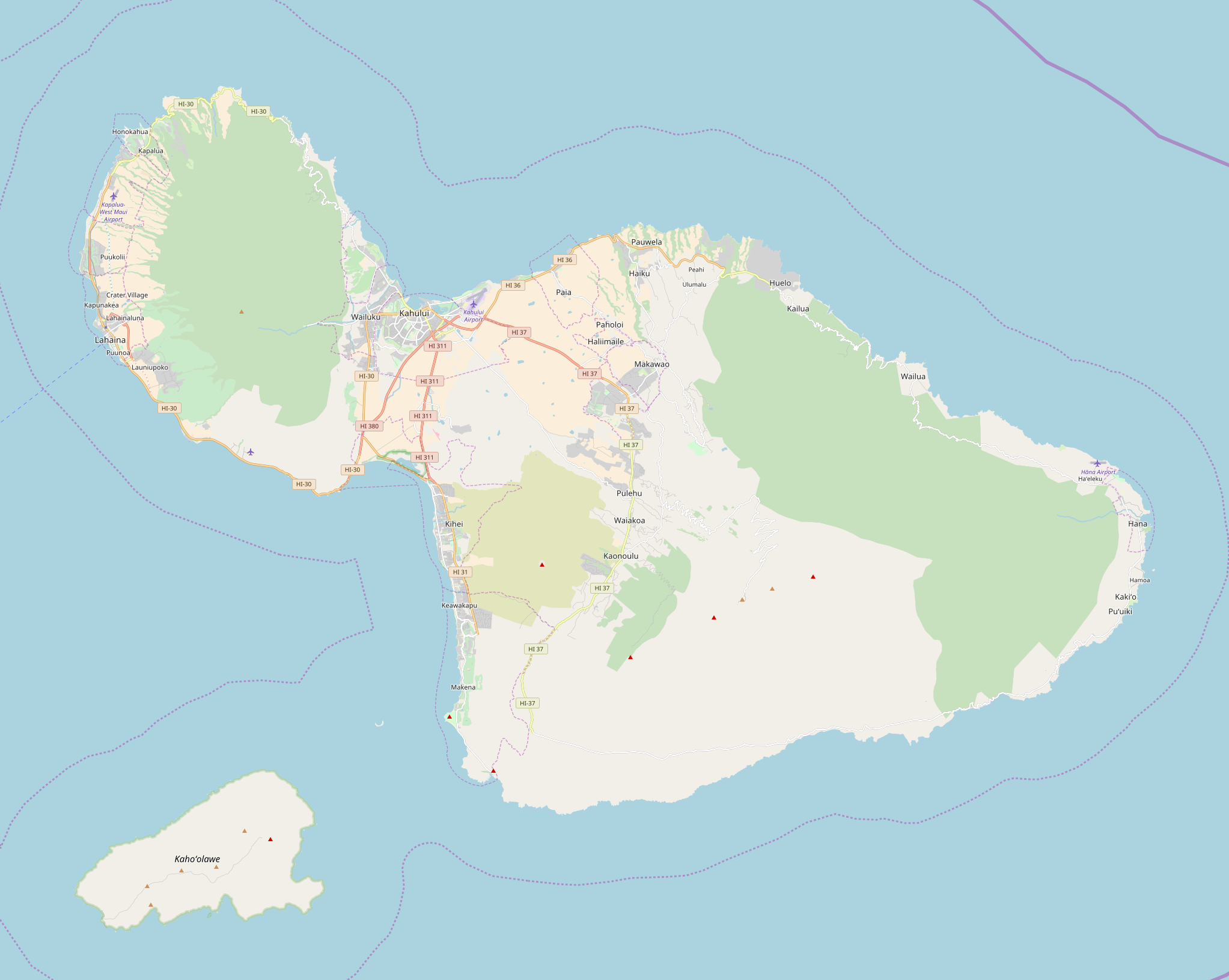
- Location within Maui Location within Hawaii
- Location: Haleakalā National Park
- Coordinates: 20.6636°N 156.0429°W
- Etymology: "something special" in Hawaiian
- Primary outflows: Pacific Ocean

The Pools of ʻOheʻo, also known as the Seven Sacred Pools, are a group of tiered pools in ʻOheʻo Gulch in Haleakalā National Park in Maui, Hawaii. They are located in the national park's Kipahulu area. Despite its nickname, there are more than seven pools in the area. The Hawaiian word "ʻOheʻo" translates to "something special."

== History ==
The nickname "Seven Sacred Pools" came from the owner of the Travaasa Hana hotel nearby in the 1940s, as it helped with advertising the isolated area to tourists. The pools are not sacred to Hawaiian culture. In 1960, many locals, including Sam Pryor, feared that the falls would be negatively affected by the tourists visiting the pools. Pryor was friends with philanthropist and conservationist Laurance Rockefeller, whom he asked to buy a part of the area to protect. This area was sold in 1969 to the National Park Service to become a part of Haleakalā National Park.

== Dangers ==
Visitors are not allowed to swim in the pools as they contain numerous rocks that have fallen from the nearby cliffs. Despite the many signs, the ban on jumping in the pool is rarely enforced and many tourists have jumped into the pools, resulting in multiple deaths and injuries.
