= Brother Noland =

American singer-songwriter

Brother Noland is an American musician and author, known chiefly as a performer of Hawaiian music and slack-key guitar.

Noland was raised in a musical family; his mother and brother were hula dancers, and he began playing music in clubs while still a teenager in the 1960s.

Noland is known as the "Father of Jawaiian music", and one of his best-known songs in this idiom is "Coconut Girl", which appeared on the soundtrack to the film Pineapple Express. Other songs which received airplay in Hawaii include "Pua Lane", "Are You Native?", and "Backfire". In 2014, the Hawaii State House of Representatives of the Twenty-Seventh Legislature passed H.R. 205 that recognized Brother Noland for a lifetime achievements and his impact on island music. As of 2017, he was touring and recording with a ten-piece band, the Brother Noland Conjugacion. His most recent album, His Songs His Stories His Style, arrived in 2017. In 2019, he was honored by the Hawai'i Academy of Recording Arts for the Lifetime Achievement Awards.

Noland is also a published author and philanthropist. In 1999, he published Lessons of Aloha, a collection of inspirational short stories. He runs a series of nature and subsistence-advocacy camps, principally on Molokai, and in 2013 published The Hawaiian Survival Handbook, a guide to living off the land in Hawaiʻi.

== Discography ==
- Speaking Brown (1980)
- Pacific Bad Boy (1983)
- Native News (1986)
- Reef Run Away (1988)
- Sun Daddy (1993)
- Hawaiian Inside (2000)
- Mystical Fish (2006)
- Hawaiian Man (2009)
- His Songs His Stories His Style (2017)
