= Mauna Kea Anaina Hou =

Native Hawaiian environmental advocacy group

- Part of the Hawaiian sovereignty movement and Thirty Meter Telescope protests

Mauna Kea Anaina Hou ("People who pray for the mountain",) and its sister group, Mauna Kea Hui, are indigenous, Native Hawaiian, cultural groups with environmental concerns located in the state of Hawaii.

== Background ==
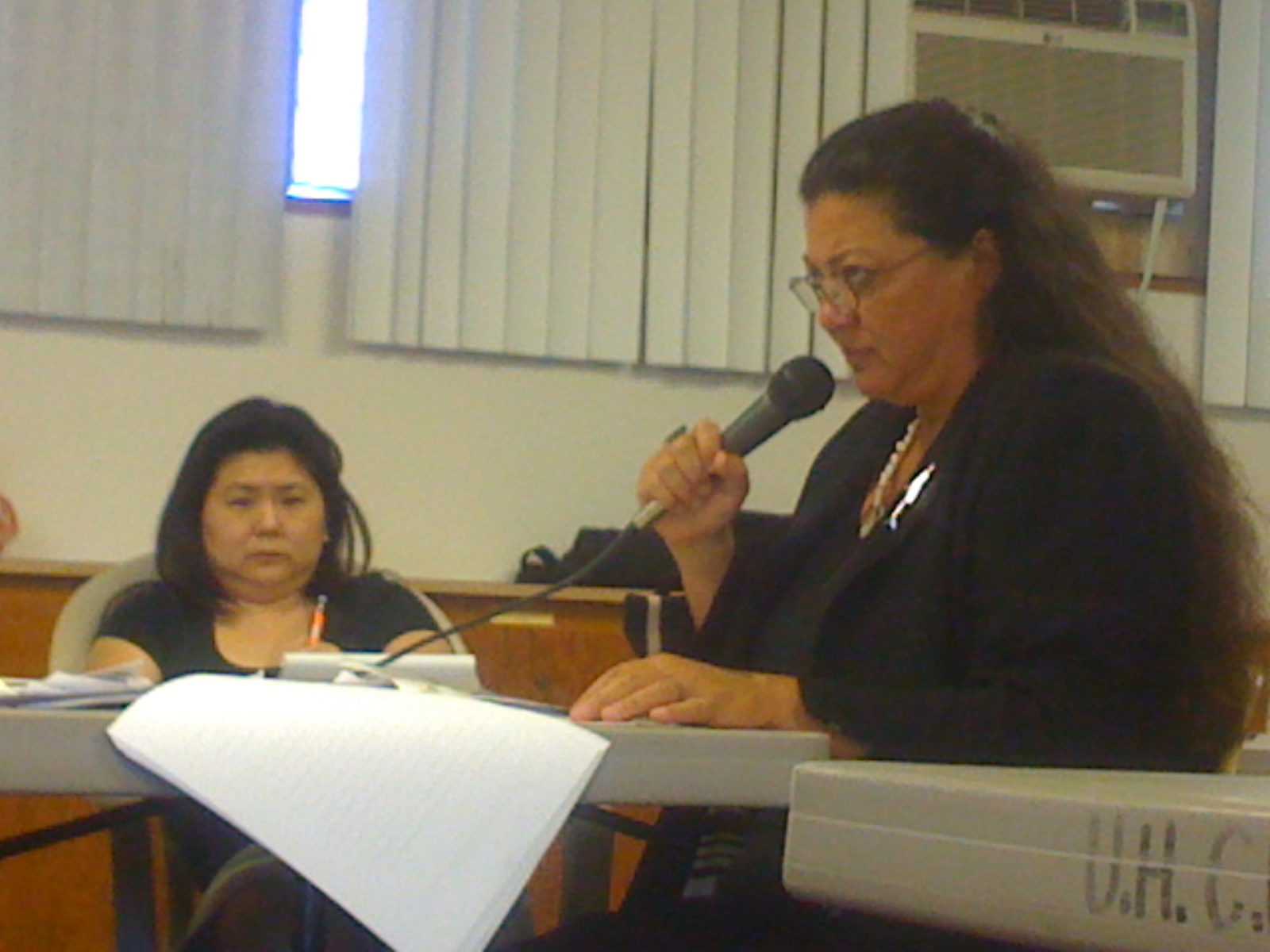
Kealoha Pisciotta, at a hearing for the proposed Thirty Meter Telescope

Hawaiian cultural organizations have objected to the observatories on Mauna Kea as sacrilegious, spoiling their god's home and destroying the shrines of Hawaiian families. MKAH was founded by Kealoha Pisciotta, a former systems specialist for the joint British-Dutch-Canadian James Clerk Maxwell Telescope, who became concerned that a stone family shrine she had built for her grandmother and family, years earlier, had been removed and found at a dump. The shrine was removed by a tour guide from the University of Hawai'i's Institute for Astronomy. Pisciotta stated in 2002 that the group was a "Native Hawaiian organization comprised of cultural and lineal descendants, and traditional, spiritual and religious practitioners of the sacred traditions of Mauna Kea." It is described as an organization of Hawaiian cultural practitioners. While many in opposition of the observatories call for a complete removal of all telescopes from the mountain, Pisciotta and her groups support less extreme action. The issue of cultural rights on the mountain was the focus of the documentary Mauna Kea: Temple Under Siege, which aired on PBS in 2006 and featured Kealoha Pisciotta. The Hawaii State Constitution guarantees the religious and cultural rights of Native Hawaiians. Many of the state of Hawaii's laws can be traced back to Kingdom of Hawaii law. Hawai`i Revised Statute § 1-1 codifies Hawaiian custom and gives deference to native traditions. In the early 1970s, managers of Mauna Kea did not seem to pay much attention to complaints of Native Hawaiians about the sacred nature of the mountain. Mauna Kea Anaina Hou, the Royal Order of Kamehameha I and the Sierra Club, united their opposition to the Keck's proposal of adding six addition outrigger telescopes.

In 2003 MKAH sponsored a photography exhibit along with the Royal Order of Kamehameha I, Kahakamaoli Religious Institute, Makaainana Foundation and the Sacred Mountain Society, all Native Hawaiian groups that strongly believe Mauna kea to be a sacred place. Due to a lack of cultural sensitivity with expansion of the observatories, the groups built an altar in 1998 at the summit of the mountain and conduct solstice and equinox ceremonies each year.

== Keck opposition ==
In 2004, the group spoke against an environmental study that came out in favor of an expansion to the Keck telescope, called outrigger.

Development of the Mauna Kea Observatories is still opposed by environmental groups and Native Hawaiians. A 2006 proposal for the Outrigger Telescopes to become extensions of the Keck Observatory was canceled after a judge's determination that a full environmental impact statement must be prepared before any further development of the site. The "outrigger" would have linked the Keck I and Keck II telescopes. Environmental groups and Native Hawaiian activist were a lot stronger at this time than in the past but NASA went ahead with the proposal for lack of an alternate site. The group Mauna Kea Anaina Hou made several arguments against the development including that Mauna Kea was a sacred mountain to Native Hawaiians where many deities lived and that the cinder cone being proposed was holy in Hawaiian tradition as a burial site for a demi-god. The group raised several other concerns such as environmental over native insects, the question of Ceded lands and an audit report, critical of the mountains management. The case was handled pro bono by a team including L. Hong who, in 2005, won an award for working to protect Hawaiian land and culture.

== TMT opposition ==
Mauna Kea Hui gained the support of Hollywood actors, Jason Momoa and Kala Alexandra as well as surfer and politician, Dustin Barca in 2015. On April 17, 2015 Governor David Ige announced a temporary halt to construction of the TMT. Mauna Kea Hui thanked the governor of Hawaii and his staff in an official statement.

After the arrests of 31 people blocking the road to Mauna Kea in April 2015, MKH stated; "There are no words… we are deeply deeply saddened by the arrests today of our Hawaiian brothers and sisters and other citizens who were peacefully protecting Mauna Kea from further desecration while we wait for Hawaiʻi’s courts to hear our appeal.".. In 2015 MKH sent a letter to the Hawaii attorney general relating to access of the mountain being limited to observatory employees and their crews. The group was one of several parties to win revocation of the Thirty Meter Telescope permit in 2015.

MKAH made national headlines in 2015 for their lawsuit relating to their protest of the Thirty Meter Telescope on Mauna Kea, on the Island of Hawaii. The Canadian group Idle No More expressed support for Mauna Kea Anaina Hou. Another group that has supported MKAH's efforts is the Sierra Club of Hawaii.
