= Haleakalā National Park =

National park in Hawaii, United States

- IUCN category II (national park)
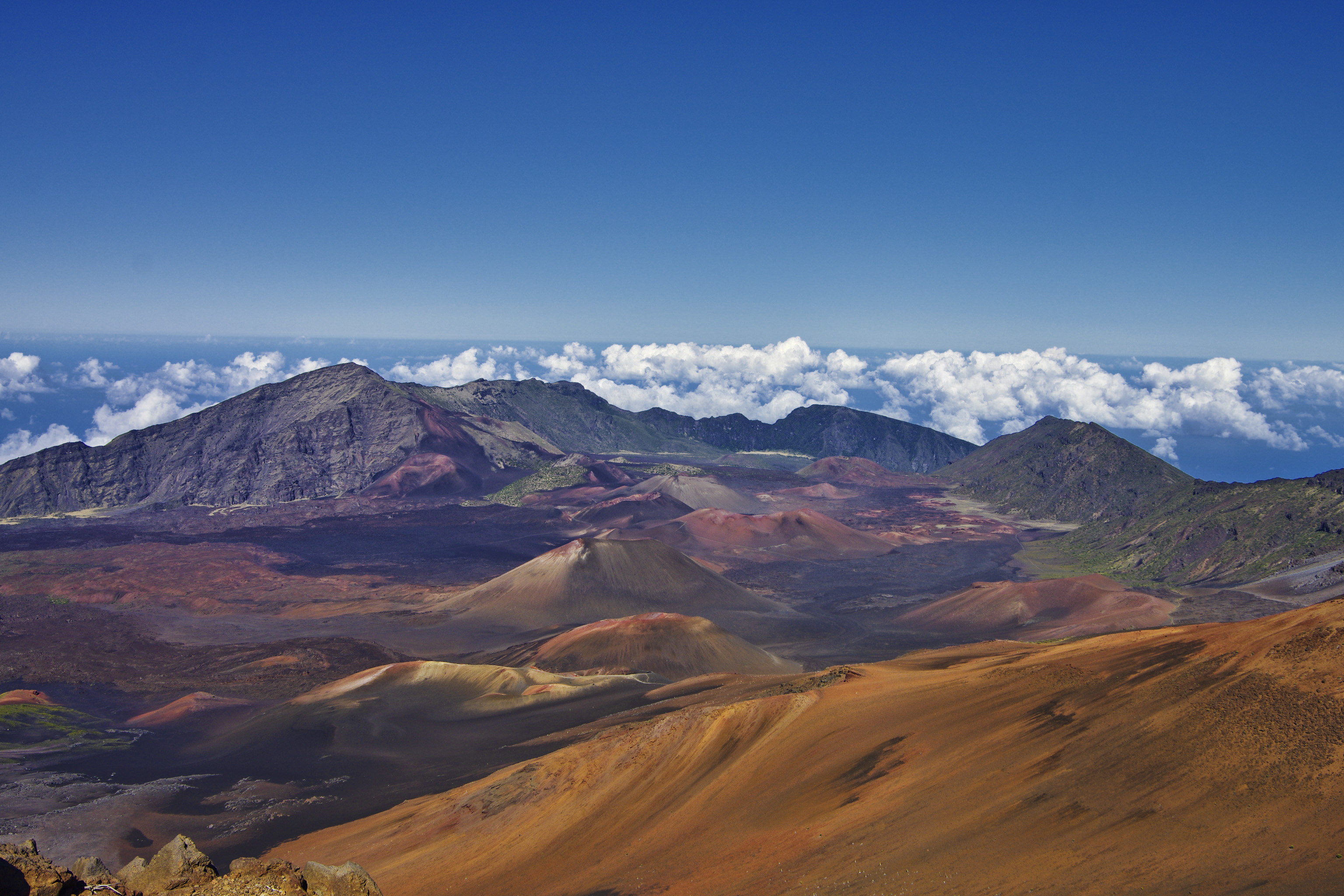

- Location within Hawaii
- Interactive map of Haleakalā National Park
- Location: Maui County, Hawaii, United States
- Nearest city: Pukalani
- Coordinates: 20°43′0″N 156°10′0″W
- Area: 33,265 acres (134.62 km^{2})
- Established: July 1, 1961
- Visitors: 1,087,616 (in 2022)
- Governing body: National Park Service
- Website: nps.gov/hale

Haleakalā National Park is a national park of the United States located on the island of Maui, Hawaii. Named after Haleakalā, a dormant volcano within its boundaries, the park covers an area of 33,265 acres (52.0 sq mi; 134.6 km^{2}), of which 24,719 acres (38.6 sq mi; 100.0 km^{2}) is a wilderness area. The land was designated a national park in 1976 and its boundaries expanded in 2005.

== History ==
Haleakalā was originally part of Hawaii National Park along with the volcanoes of Mauna Loa and Kilauea on the island of Hawaiʻi, created in 1916. Hawaiʻi Volcanoes National Park was made into a separate national park in 1961 by Bill S. 3623. The park area was designated an International Biosphere Reserve in 1980. The name Haleakalā is Hawaiian for "house of the sun". According to a local legend, the demigod Maui imprisoned the sun here in order to lengthen the day. The Hawaiian National Park Language Correction Act of 2000 was proposed to observe the Hawaiian spelling, but it did not become law.

The park features the dormant Haleakalā (East Maui) Volcano, which last erupted sometime between 1480 and 1600 AD. The park is divided into two distinct sections: the summit area and the coastal Kipahulu area.

Haleakalā National Park has been a part of the Pacific West Region since its inception in 1961.

== Summit ==
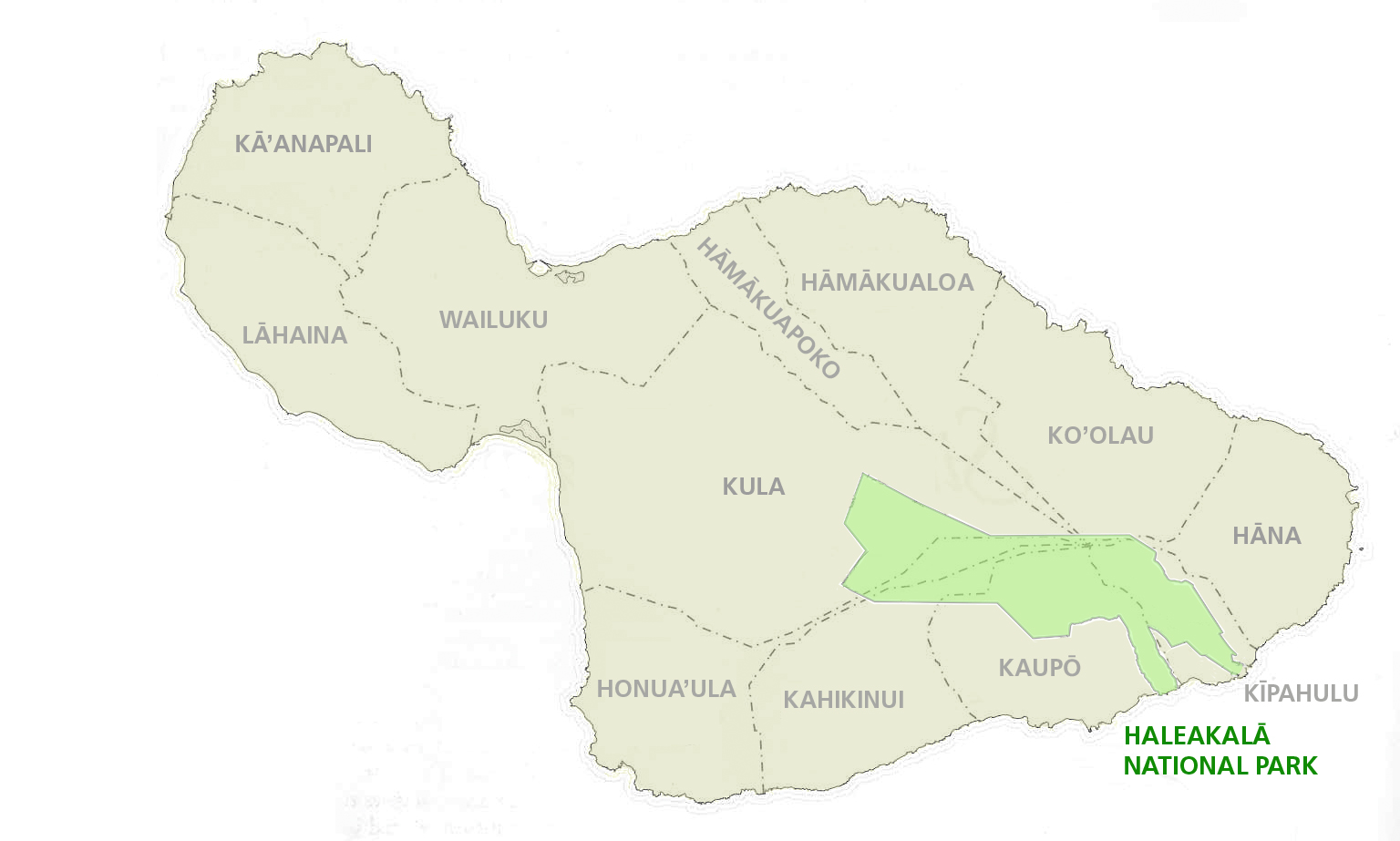
Location of Haleakalā National Park in the southeastern part of Maui Island

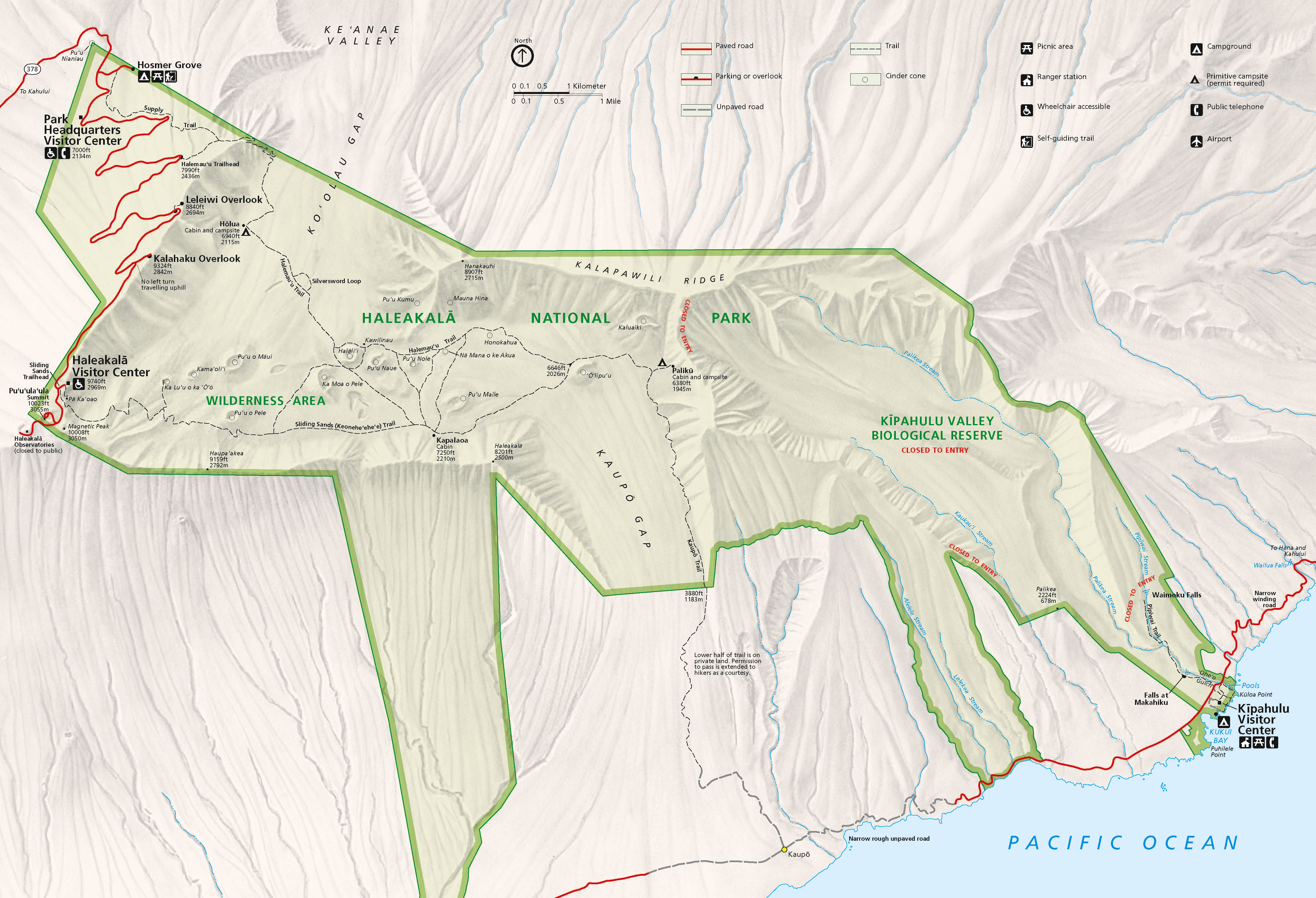
Detail map of Haleakalā National Park

An extremely winding but well maintained road leads up the mountain. The summit area includes Haleakalā Crater, the summit of the volcano, and the area surrounding the summit. This part of the park is accessed by Hawaii State Road 378. There is a visitor center, with parking and restrooms, near the summit. At the summit itself is another parking lot and a simple observatory without facilities.

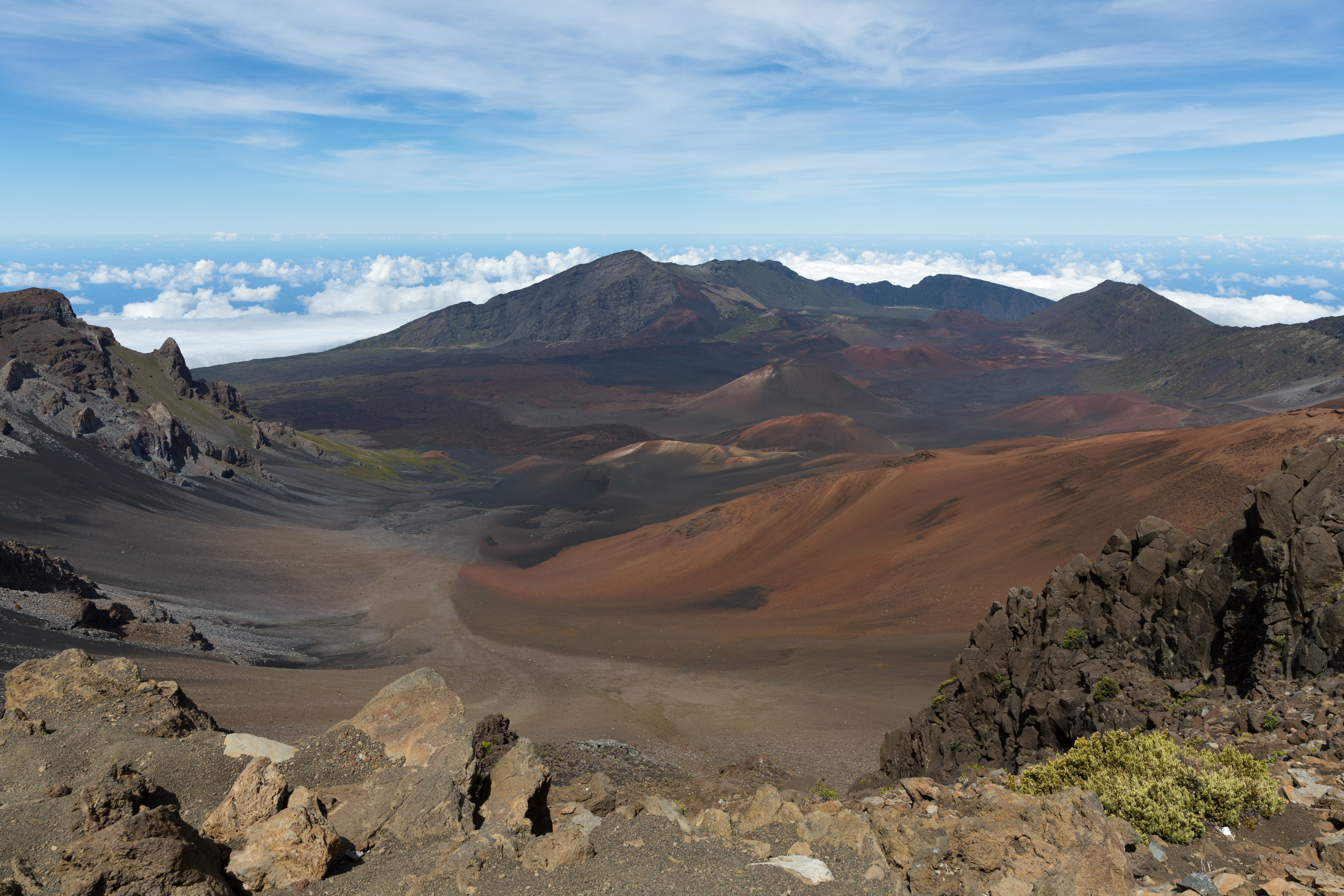
Visitor center view at 9,740 feet (2,970 m)

The main feature of this part of the park is Haleakalā Crater which, despite its name, is geologically an erosional valley. It is 6.99 miles (11.25 km) across, 2.0 mi (3.2 km) wide, and 2,600 ft (790 m) deep. The interior of the crater is dotted by numerous volcanic features, including large cinder cones. Two main trails lead into the crater from the summit area: the Halemau'u and Sliding Sands trails, both of which are designated as National Recreation Trails. Hikers in the crater can stay in one of three cabins.

Visitors frequently come to the summit of the volcano to watch the sunrise and/or sunset. One attraction of the park is Hosmer's Grove, a unique forest of trees including deodar (Cedrus deodara) from the Himalayas, sugi (Cryptomeria japonica) from Japan, eucalyptus from Australia, and several species from North America (pine, spruce, cypress, fir, and others). Native plants and trees are also present in the forest but are not common because the taller alien trees leave them little light to grow.

The park is known for its volcanic features, its long scenic drive with numerous overlooks, and the unusually clear views of the night sky available. Haleakalā is one of the best places in the United States for amateur astronomy, and binoculars and telescopes are available for rent from many local merchants. Nēnē (Hawaiian geese, Branta sandvicensis) can also be seen in their natural habitat in Haleakalā Crater. Although nēnē died out entirely in the park, in 1962 they were re-introduced with the help of the Boy Scouts, who carried young birds into the crater in their backpacks.

== Climate ==
At its lowest, near the ocean, the National Park has a tropical rainforest climate bordering a tropical monsoon climate. However, as altitudes progresses the climate becomes oceanic/Mediterranean, reaching, at the very top of Haleakalā, an alpine climate.

Climate data for Haleakalā Ranger Station, Hawaii, 1991–2020 normals, extremes 1940–2022, altitude: 6,962 ft (2,122 m)
Month	Jan	Feb	Mar	Apr	May	Jun	Jul	Aug	Sep	Oct	Nov	Dec	Year
Record high °F (°C)	78 (26)	76 (24)	78 (26)	79 (26)	78 (26)	78 (26)	80 (27)	78 (26)	78 (26)	80 (27)	76 (24)	74 (23)	80 (27)
Mean maximum °F (°C)	68.6 (20.3)	67.5 (19.7)	67.2 (19.6)	67.8 (19.9)	70.3 (21.3)	72.2 (22.3)	72.6 (22.6)	73.0 (22.8)	70.1 (21.2)	70.4 (21.3)	69.7 (20.9)	69.4 (20.8)	74.6 (23.7)
Mean daily maximum °F (°C)	61.0 (16.1)	59.7 (15.4)	59.7 (15.4)	60.7 (15.9)	63.2 (17.3)	65.6 (18.7)	65.5 (18.6)	66.1 (18.9)	64.7 (18.2)	64.0 (17.8)	63.1 (17.3)	61.1 (16.2)	62.9 (17.2)
Daily mean °F (°C)	52.5 (11.4)	51.2 (10.7)	51.4 (10.8)	52.2 (11.2)	54.6 (12.6)	56.6 (13.7)	57.2 (14.0)	57.7 (14.3)	56.3 (13.5)	55.9 (13.3)	55.0 (12.8)	53.1 (11.7)	54.5 (12.5)
Mean daily minimum °F (°C)	43.9 (6.6)	42.7 (5.9)	43.1 (6.2)	43.8 (6.6)	45.9 (7.7)	47.7 (8.7)	48.9 (9.4)	49.4 (9.7)	47.9 (8.8)	47.8 (8.8)	47.0 (8.3)	45.1 (7.3)	46.1 (7.8)
Mean minimum °F (°C)	37.3 (2.9)	36.5 (2.5)	36.7 (2.6)	38.5 (3.6)	40.0 (4.4)	42.2 (5.7)	42.8 (6.0)	43.2 (6.2)	42.7 (5.9)	42.6 (5.9)	41.0 (5.0)	39.1 (3.9)	34.6 (1.4)
Record low °F (°C)	29 (−2)	27 (−3)	30 (−1)	31 (−1)	32 (0)	33 (1)	32 (0)	33 (1)	35 (2)	31 (−1)	29 (−2)	30 (−1)	27 (−3)
Average precipitation inches (mm)	5.14 (131)	4.08 (104)	5.70 (145)	2.75 (70)	2.44 (62)	1.62 (41)	2.70 (69)	2.17 (55)	2.53 (64)	3.25 (83)	4.59 (117)	5.28 (134)	42.25 (1,073)
Average precipitation days (≥ 0.01 in)	9.3	8.8	12.9	12.1	9.3	8.6	10.7	10.7	12.1	11.5	12.3	11.8	130.1
Source: NOAA

== Issues ==
=== Feral ungulates ===
Grazing and rooting feral deer, goats, and pigs have been destroying native vegetation. They trample the ground and break down the native plants and cause soil erosion. Biodiversity has been compromised and is negatively affecting the groundwater reserve.

=== Nēnē ===
The nēnē bird is on the endangered species list. The bird was once on all the islands of Hawaii, but now it is only on the Island of Hawai’i, Maui, Moloka’i, and Kaua’i. Habitat loss, hunting, and the introduction of mammals caused the bird population to dwindle. Since 2010, only 2,000 birds were left. These birds were then kept in captivity to increase the population.

=== Silversword ===
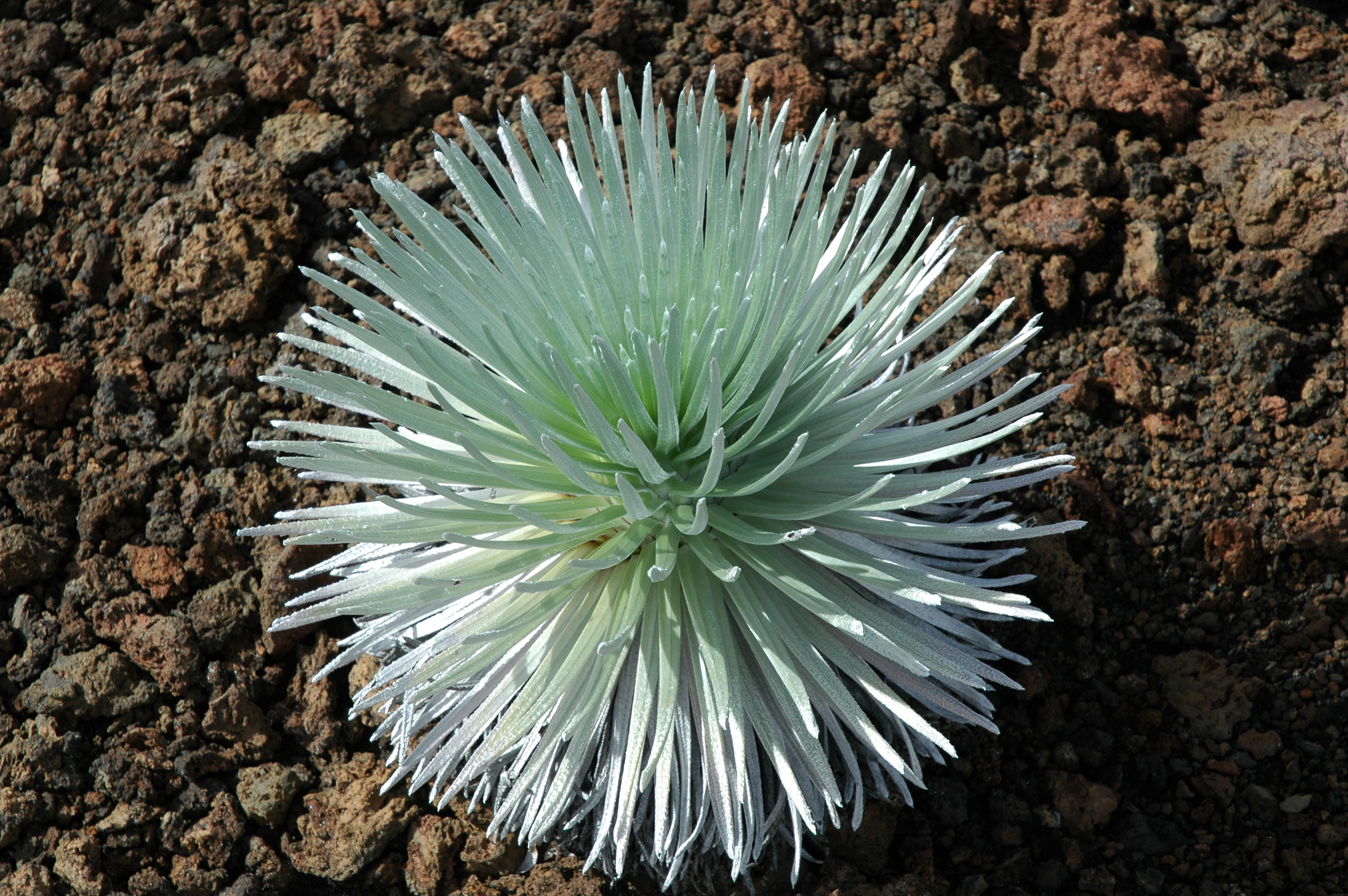
This rare species of Silversword is fragile and lives only upon the slopes of Haleakalā.

Haleakalā silversword is a quintessential plant of Haleakalā since it grows nowhere else on Earth. Climate change has been threatening the population of this plant due to hotter temperatures and lower rainfall. The park service has erected fences to prevent damage from local herbivores and from visitors taking the plants as souvenirs.

=== Forest birds ===
Several species of native forest birds across Hawaiʻi are nearly extinct, including the kiwikiu and 'ākohekohe that are found only in East Maui, whose population decreased by more than 70% in the 21st century. A primary threat is mosquito-borne diseases such as avian malaria. Attempts to relocate kiwikiu to higher elevations were unsuccessful in protecting the population, as mosquitos also rose into higher elevation habitats after the 1980s.

The working group "Birds, Not Mosquitos" joined with the National Park Service and the Hawaii Department of Land and Natural Resources to develop a plan to address the threat, eventually settling on the incompatible insect technique. As of 2024, each week some 250,000 male southern house mosquitos carrying Wolbachia bacteria were released on the mountain, totaling 10 million by June of that year. When male mosquitos with Wolbachia mate with female mosquitoes, their resulting eggs do not hatch.

=== Invertebrates ===
Haleakalā is also home to many invertebrates including snails, spiders, moths, flies, and many more. Many species including snails live in the rainforest around the mountain. While others live in the subalpine shrubland and the rocky alpine terrain. The Haleakalā flightless moth is endemic to the alpine area at the summit. Many snails including those in the genus Partulina live in the Rainforest. Yellow faced bees known as Nalo Meli Maoli in Hawaiian live in most of the mountain's habitats.

=== Deferred maintenance ===
As of 2018, the Park has deferred maintenance valued at $24,382,236. 49.8% of this number is from unpaved roads. The rest of the deferred maintenance cost range from trails, water systems, buildings, and campgrounds. To help combat this problem the Haleakalā friends group runs monthly service trips. This includes cleaning and scrubbing the cabins, the eradication of thistles, blackberries, and heterothecas. They also work on improving the nene habitat by removing invasive grass.

== Kipahulu ==
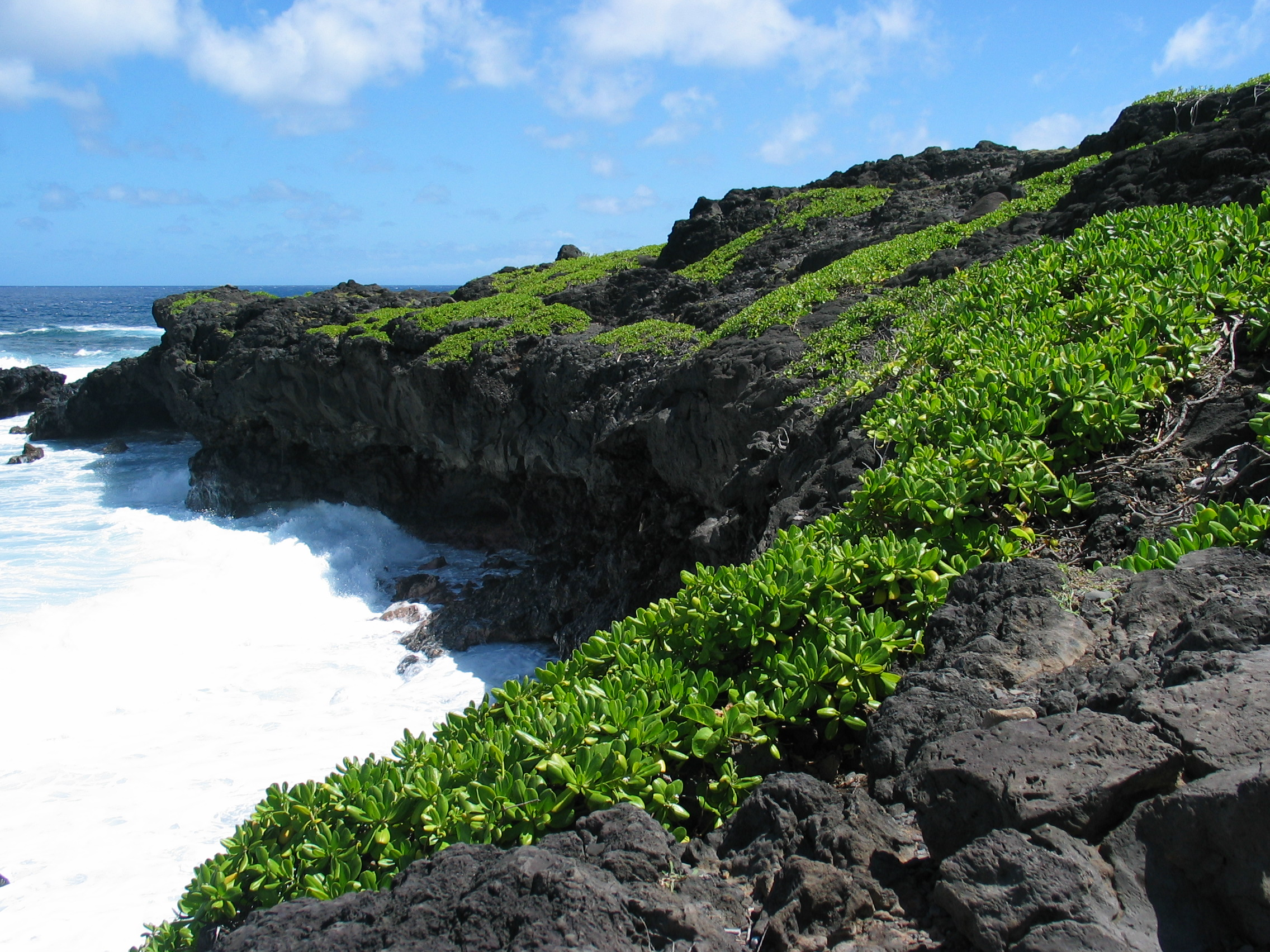
Kipahulu region, Haleakalā National Park

The second section of the park is the Kipahulu section. Visitors cannot drive directly to this section from the summit area; they must take a winding coastal road that travels around the windward coast of the island. This part of the park lies within the lower part of Kipahulu Valley. It is separated from the summit area of the park by the upper portion of the valley. This area is designated the Kipahulu Valley Biological Reserve and is closed to the public to preserve the native plant and animal species in this fragile rainforest.

This section of the park features more than two dozen pools along Palikea Stream in the gulch called ʻOheʻo. These pools contain rare native freshwater fish. Visitors may choose to swim in these pools, or they may choose to hike a trail that takes visitors up to the base of Waimoku Falls.

== Flora and fauna ==
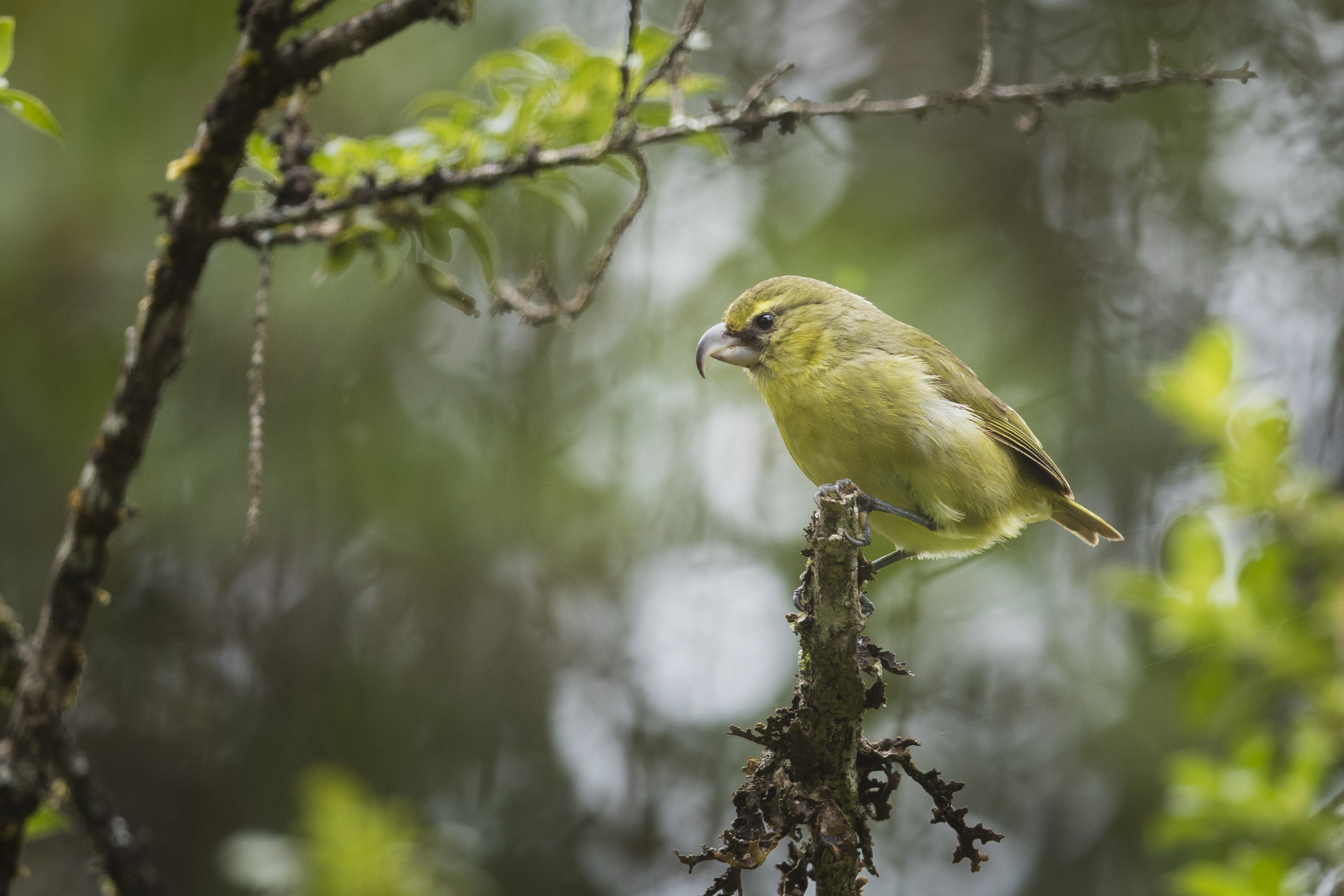
Kiwikiu or Maui Parrotbill have a rapidly decreasing population.

More endangered species live in Haleakalā National Park than any other national park in the United States. Once traveling to this part of the island became more frequent, native species were destroyed. One example is the ʻāhinahina (Haleakalā silversword, Argyroxiphium sandwicense macrocephalum), which formerly covered Haleakalā Mountain to a degree where the mountain looked as if it were covered with snow. Other endangered species include the endangered Haleakalā schiedea (Schiedea haleakalensis). Over 850 species of plants grow in the park and there are four endemic species of geraniums that are also found in the park.

The park is home to many tardigrade species surviving in the extreme environment near the mountain summit. In the 1980s, local biologist Sam Gon III discovered 31 tardigrade species here and described Haleakalā as the "richest place on Earth for tardigrades".

The park is also home to 3 endemic Hawaiian Honeycreepers only on east Maui. These include Maui Alauahio, Akohekohe, and the Critically Endangered Kiwikiu with around 200 members left.

Native Invertebrates that live in the park include insects, spiders, and snails. The insects and spiders live throughout the rainforests and Shrublands of the park. While the snails are only found in the Park’s rainforests generally in the Kipahulu valley. Many of the park’s rarest snails are in the Partulina Genus. They are called Kāhuli in Hawaiian.

== Haleakalā Observatory ==
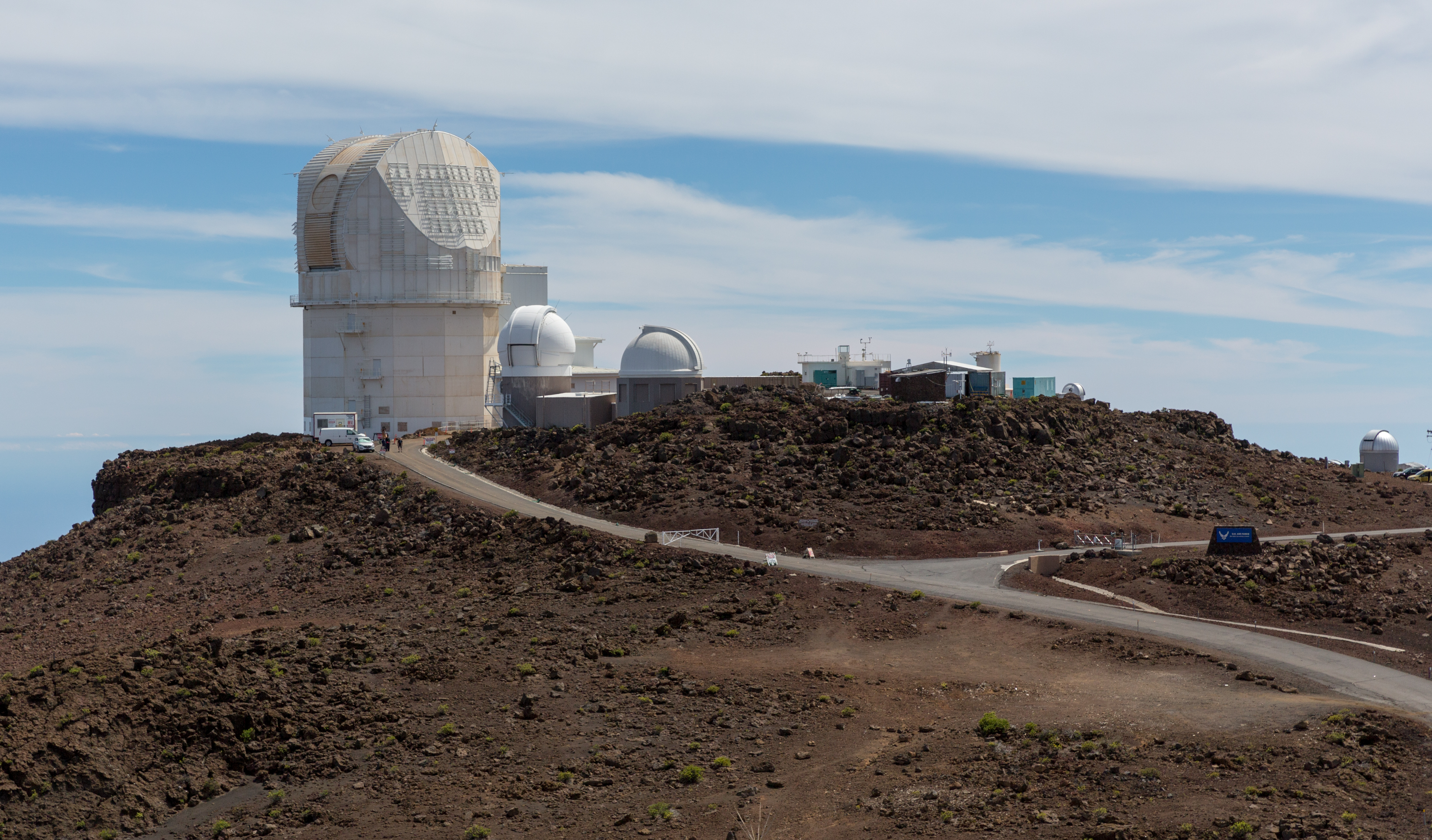
Haleakalā Observatory viewed from the Haleakalā visitor center

Haleakalā Observatory is an observation site located near the visitor center. It lies above the tropical inversion layer and so experiences excellent viewing conditions and very clear skies. For over 40 years, the University of Hawaiʻi Institute for Astronomy has managed this site, conducting dedicated astrophysical experiments. One of its missions, the Maui Space Surveillance System (MSSS), tracks satellites and debris orbiting the Earth. The buildings are on a gated road just past the summit and are not within the park boundary.

== Superintendents of Haleakalā National Park ==
The first superintendent of Haleakalā National Park was John Stratton. The current one is Natalie Gates, she has been in this position since 2013. Although, there is not a full list of superintendents on public record, the following has been reported.

- John W. Stratton 10/19/1961 – 5/11/1963
- Neal G. Guse 7/01/1963 – 7/15/1967
- Forrest M. Benson Jr. 8/27/1967 – 6/14/1969
- Lynn H. Thompson 6/29/1969 – 11/16/1970
- Russell Cahill 1/17/1971 – 4/27/1974
- Hugo H. Huntzinger 5/26/1974 – 12/19/1987
- Peter G. Sanchez 12/20/1987 – 3/26/1988
- Donald W. Reeser 3/27/1988 – ?
- Sarah Creachbuam 2009 – 2012
- Natalie Gates March 2013 – Present

== Gallery ==
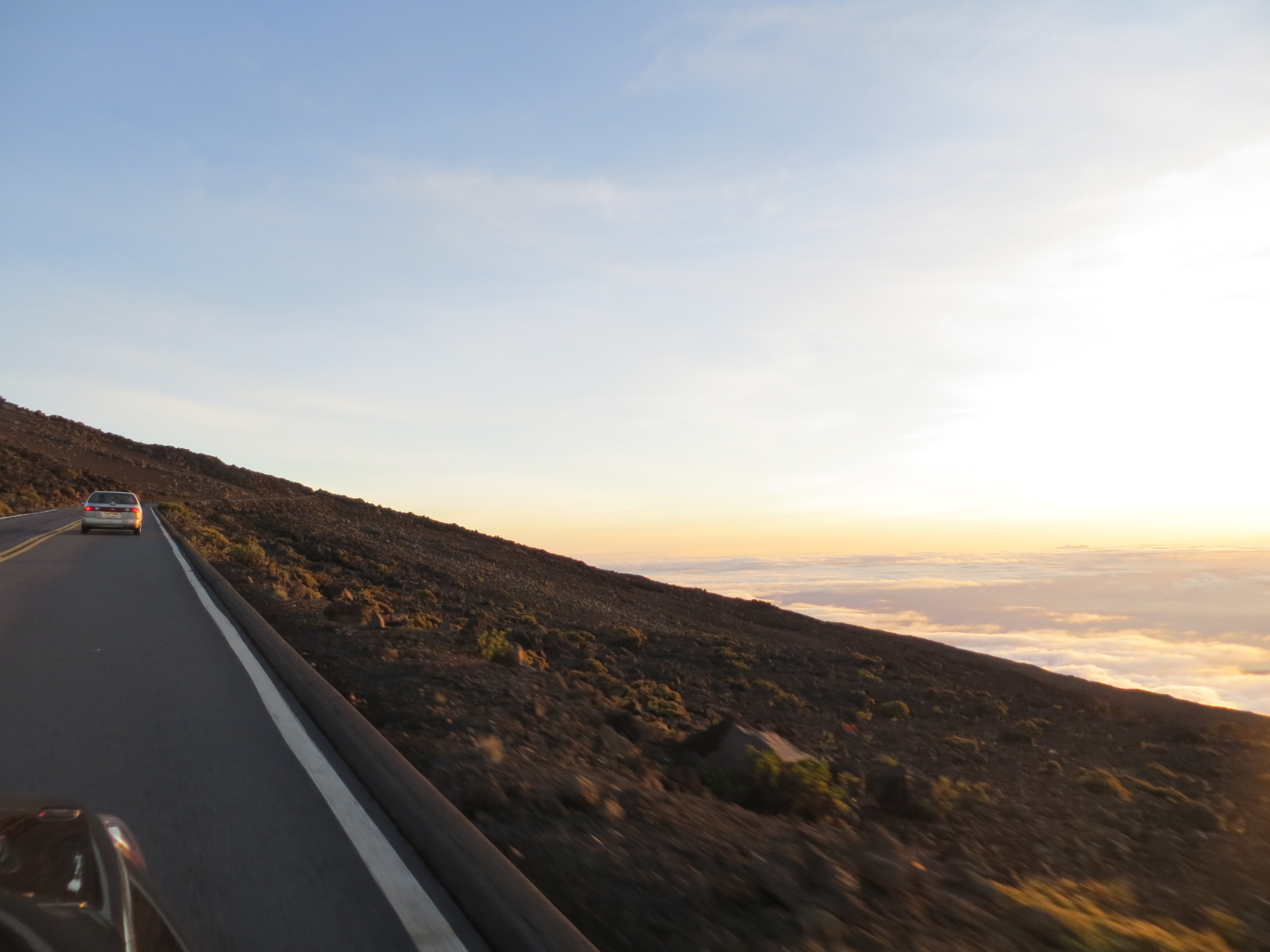
Driving to the summit of Haleakala at sunset.

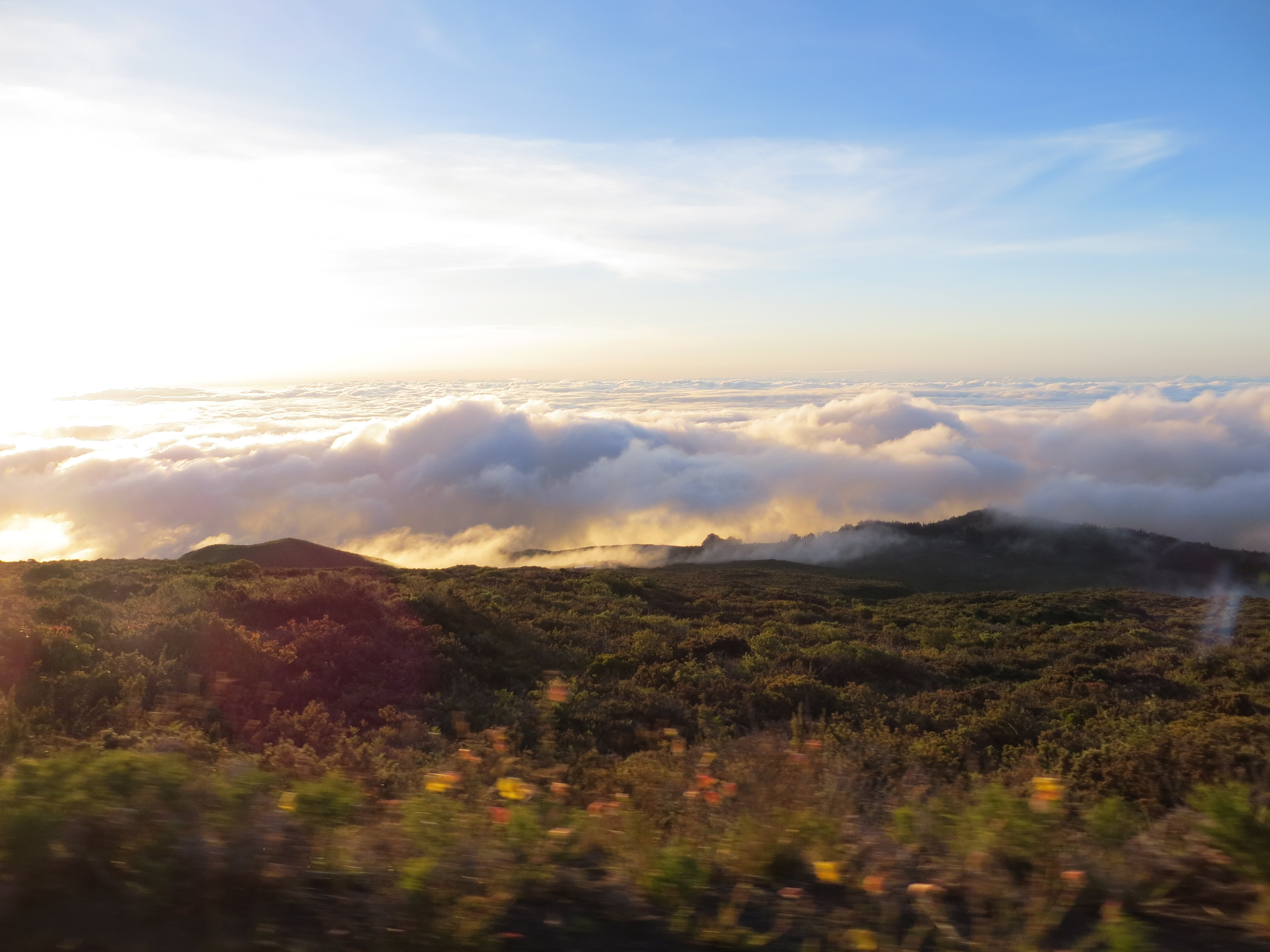
Nearing the end of vegetation growth above cloud tops while driving to the summit of Haleakala at sunset.

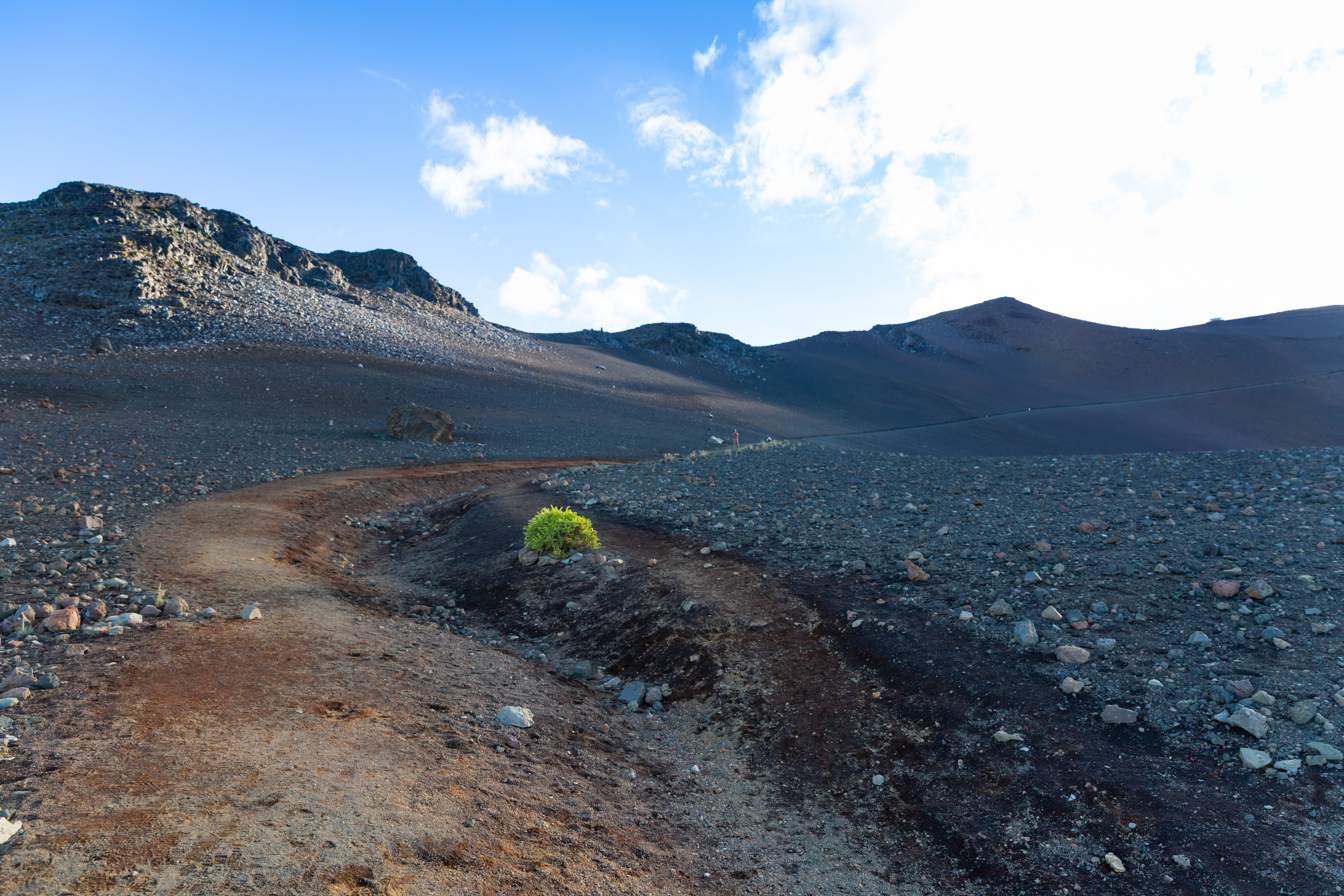
Hiking Maui's Haleakala Crater

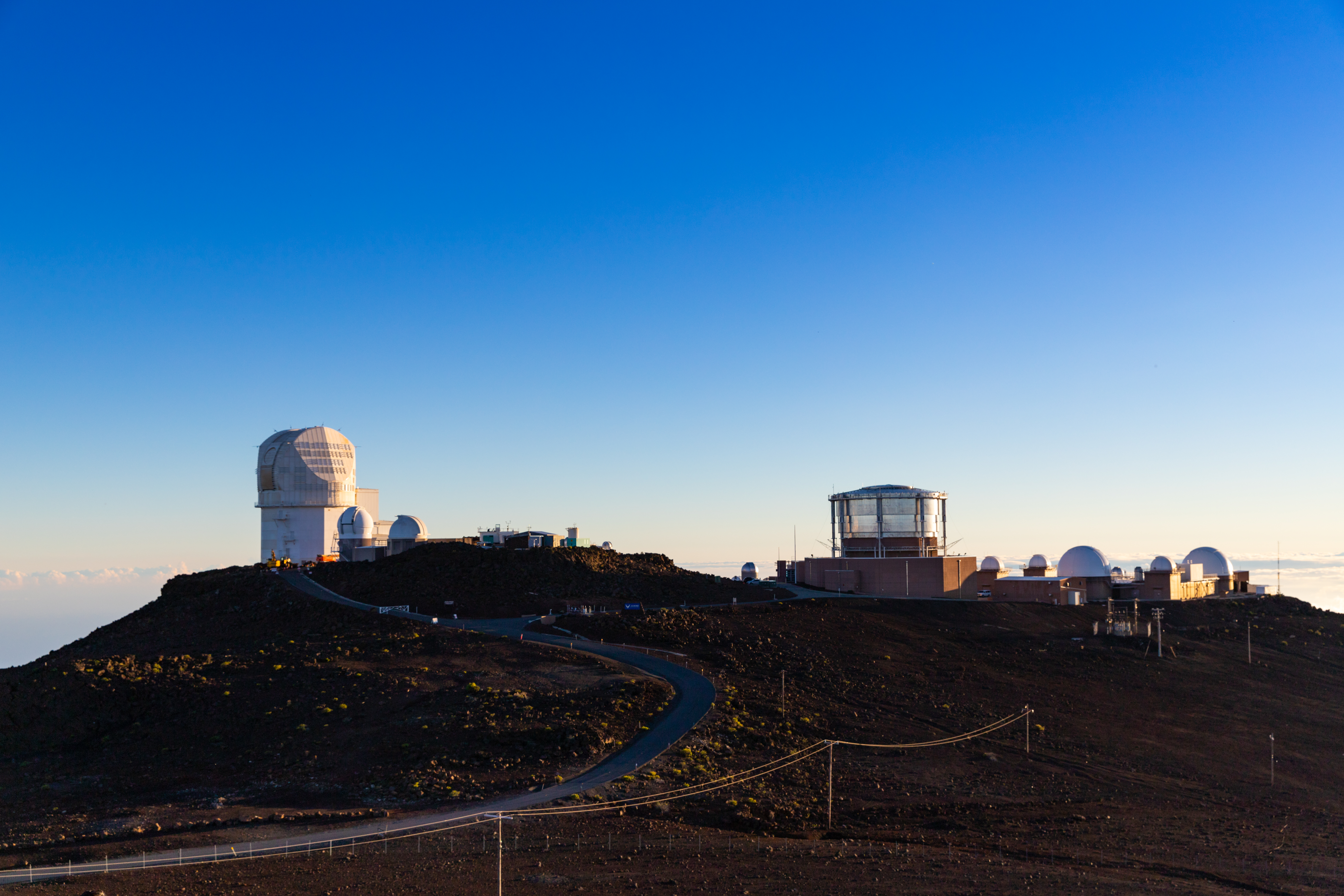
Haleakala Observatorium, Maui, Hawaii

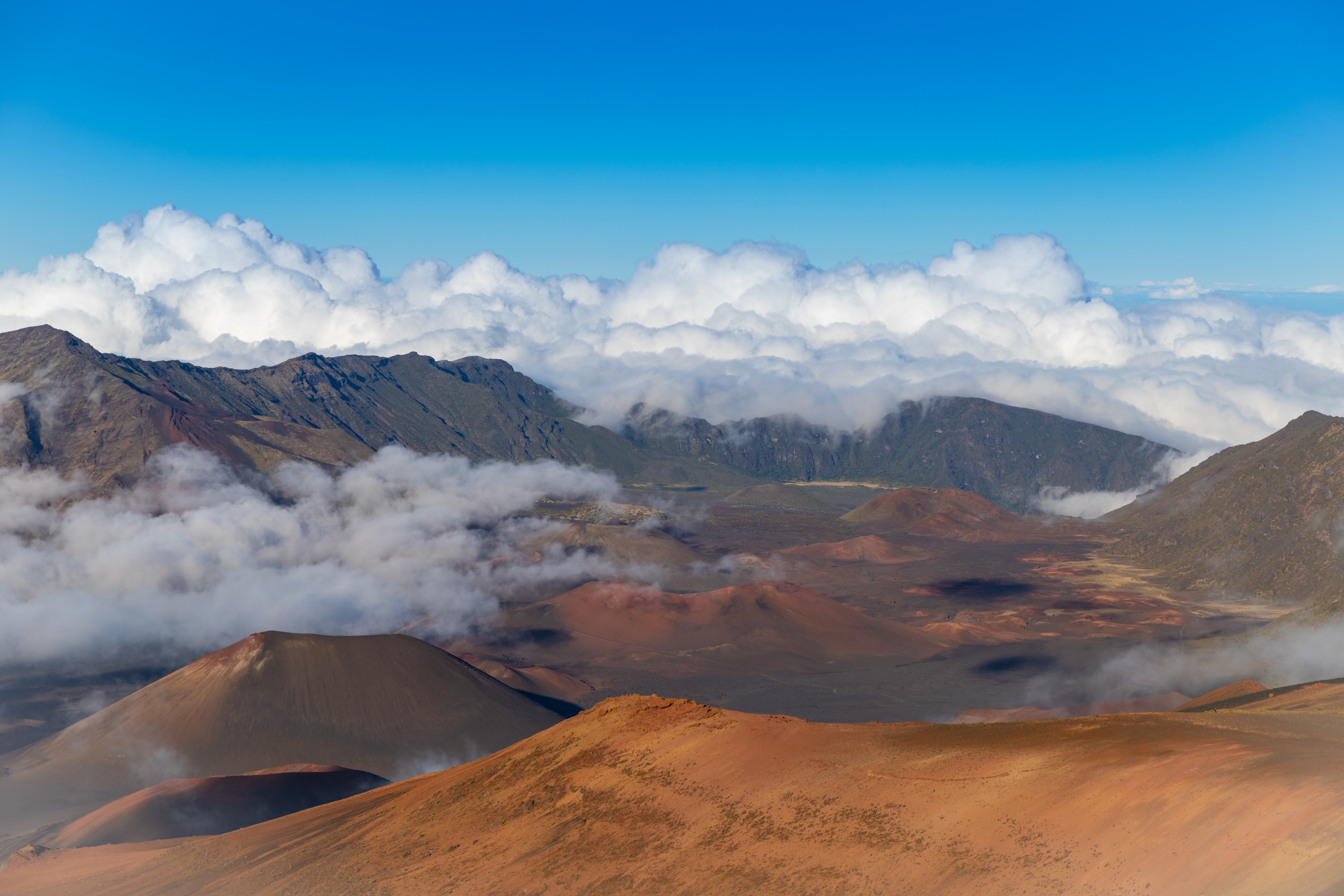
Mount Haleakala Crater, Maui, Hawaii

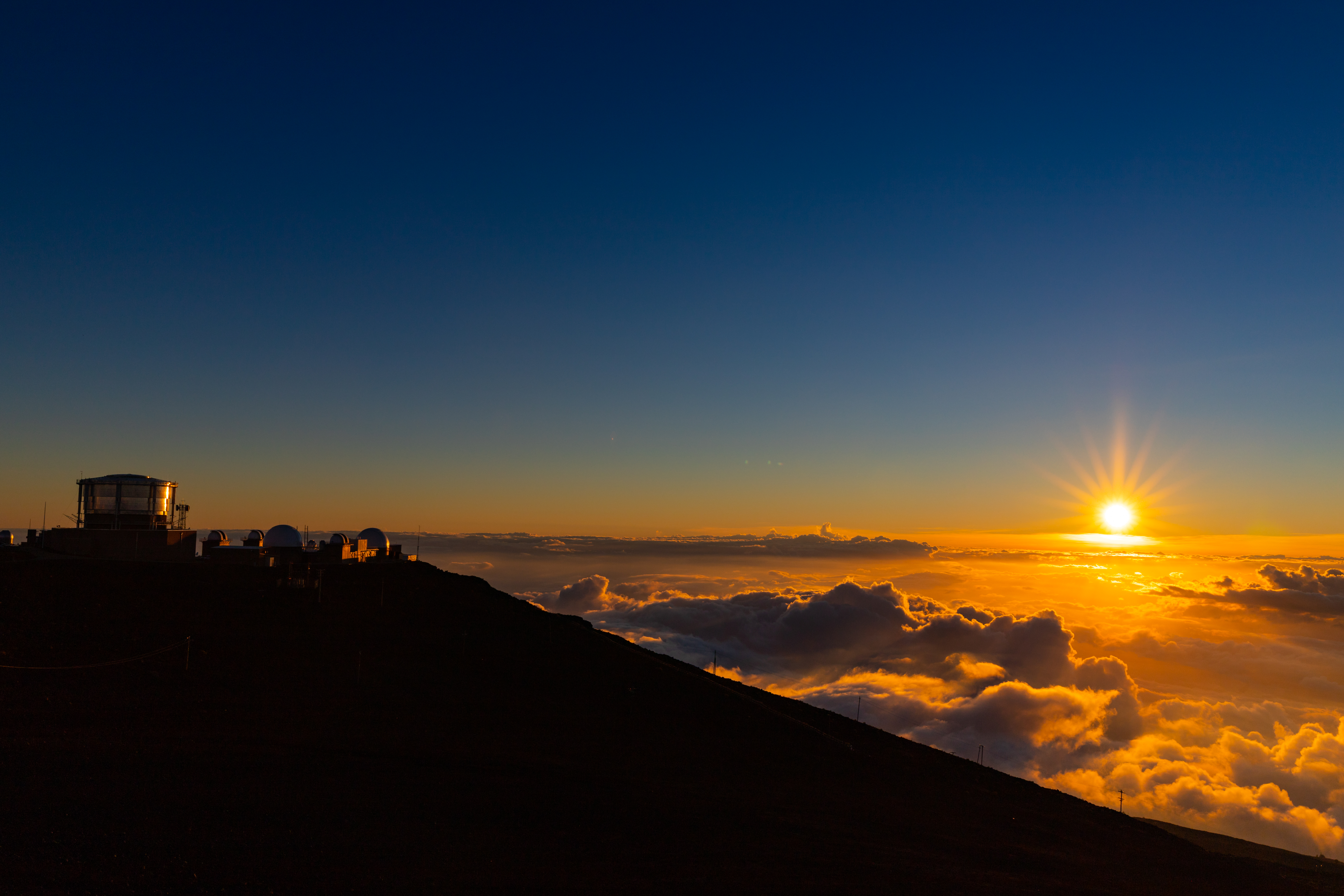
Sunset on Haleakala, Maui, Hawaii

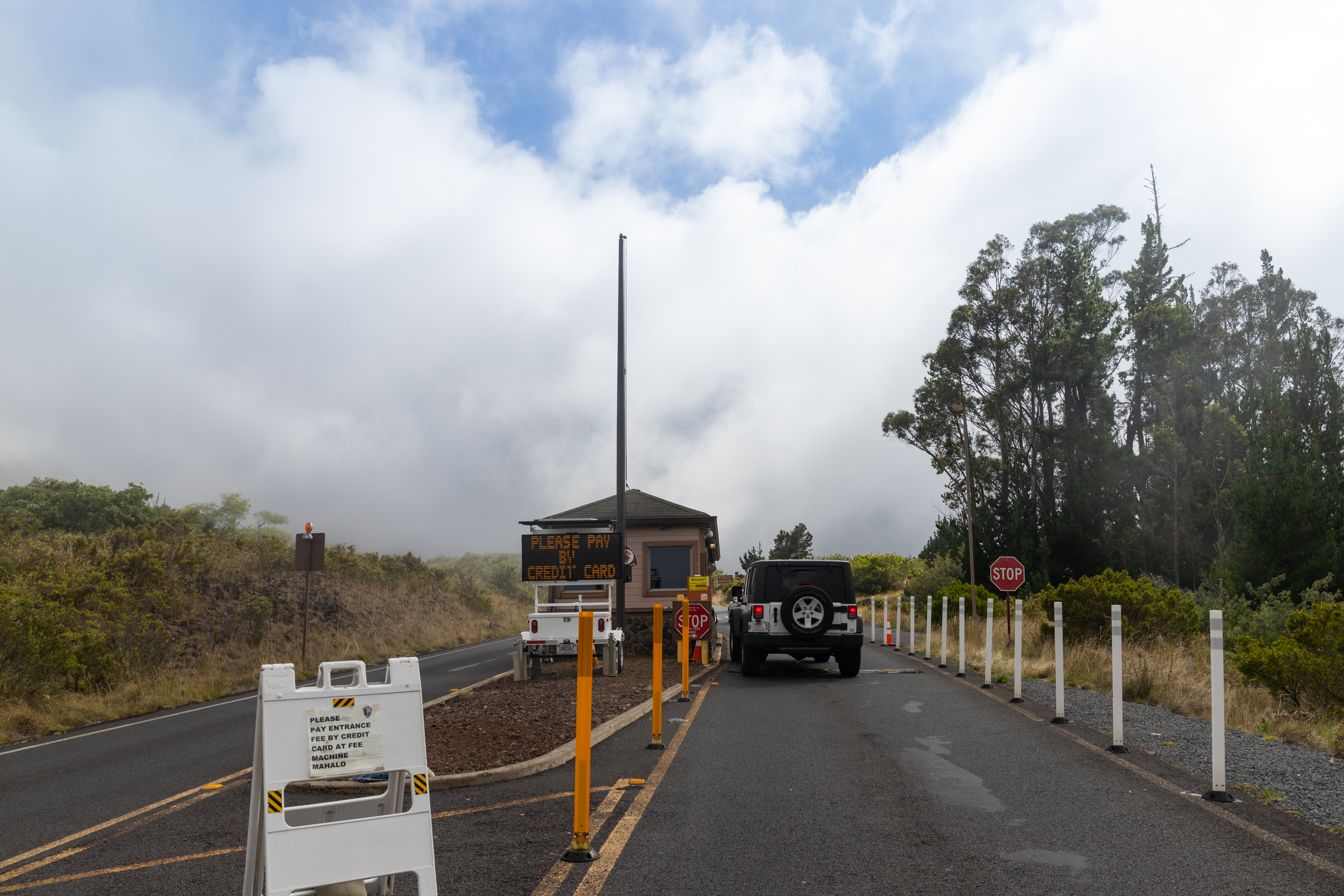
Entrance of the Mount Haleakala National Park, Maui, Hawaii

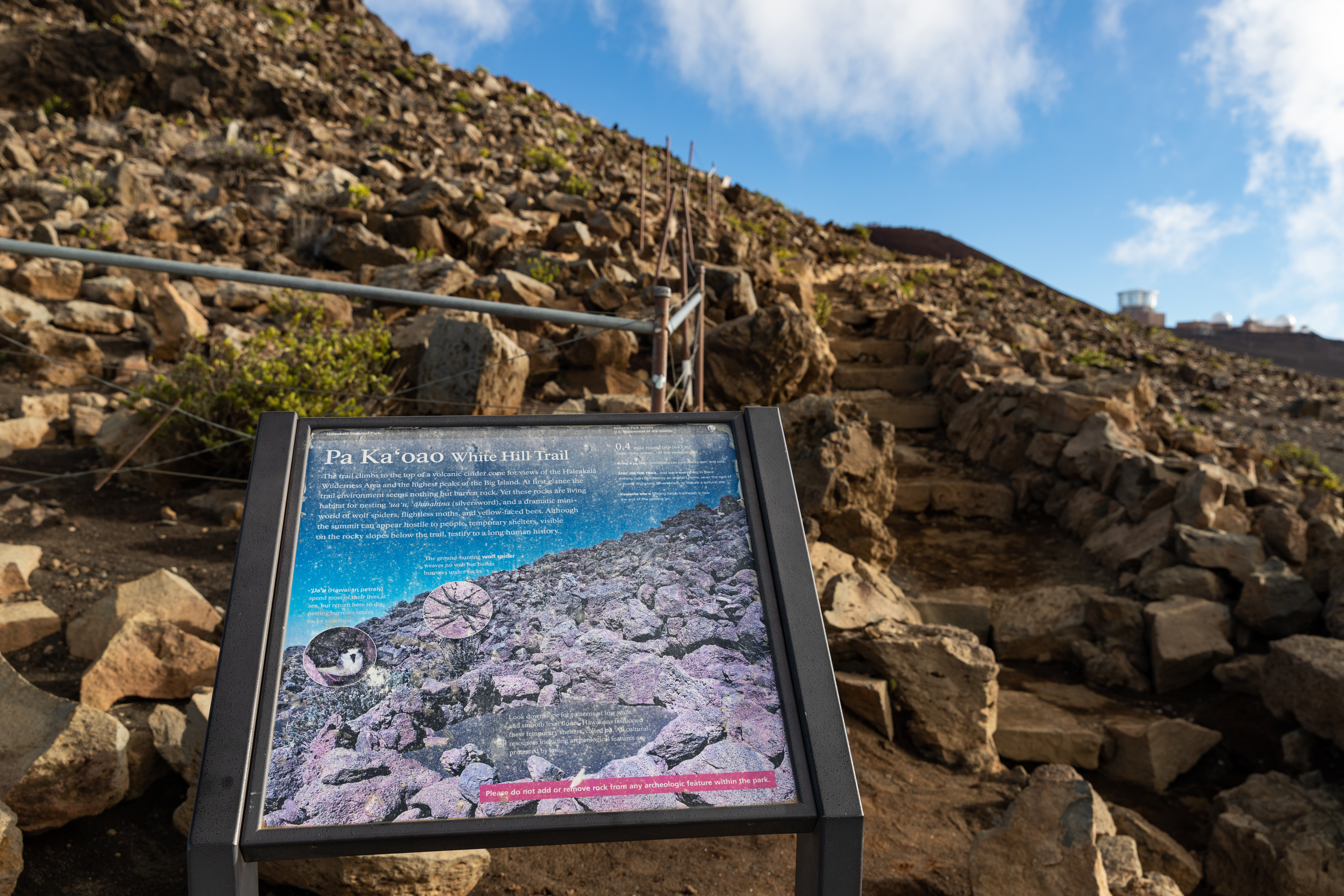
Pa Ka'oao White Hill Trail Mount Haleakala, Maui, Hawaii

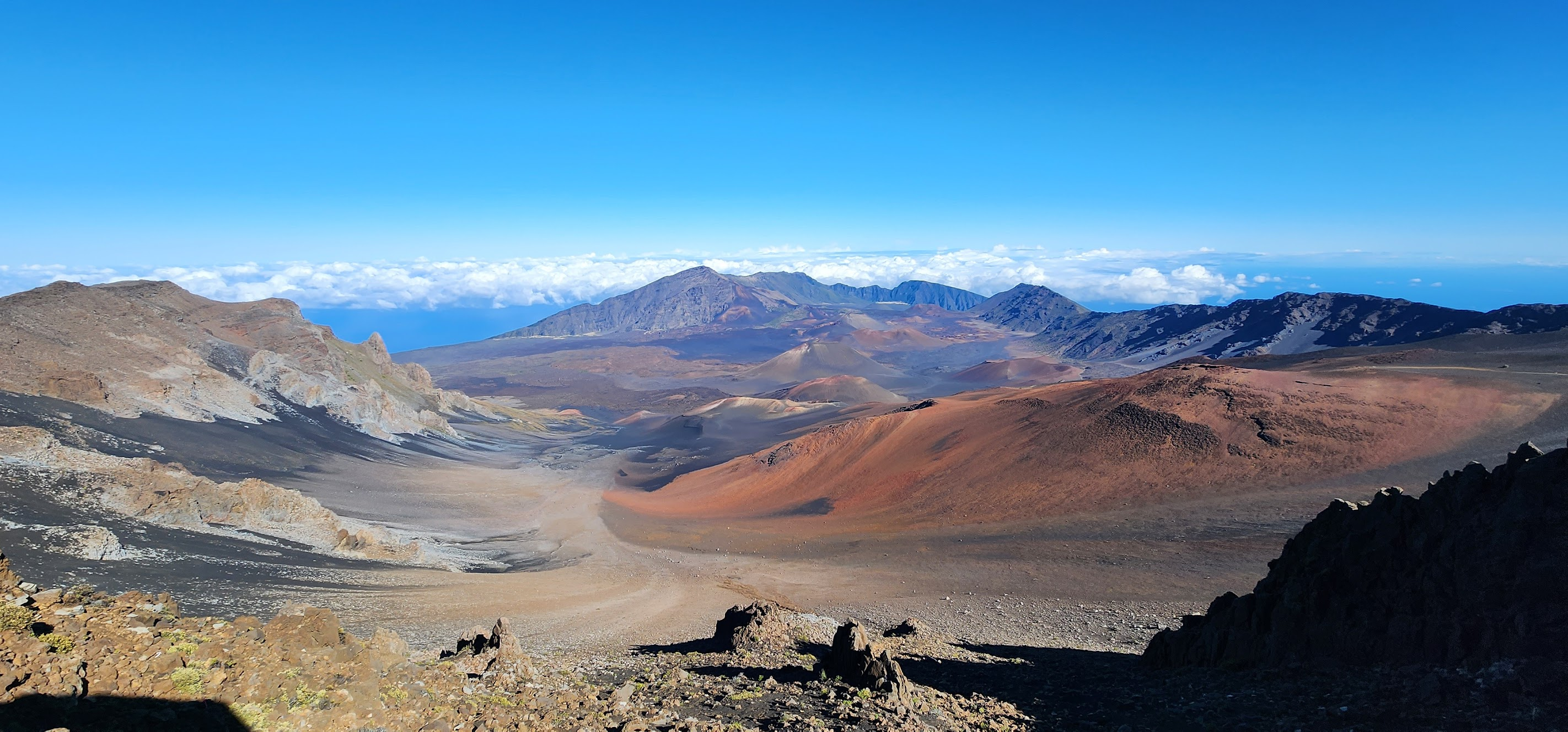
The crater at Haleakala National Park

== See also ==
- List of national parks of the United States
