= Sam Ohu Gon III =

American conservation biologist and Hawaiian cultural practitioner

Sam Gon
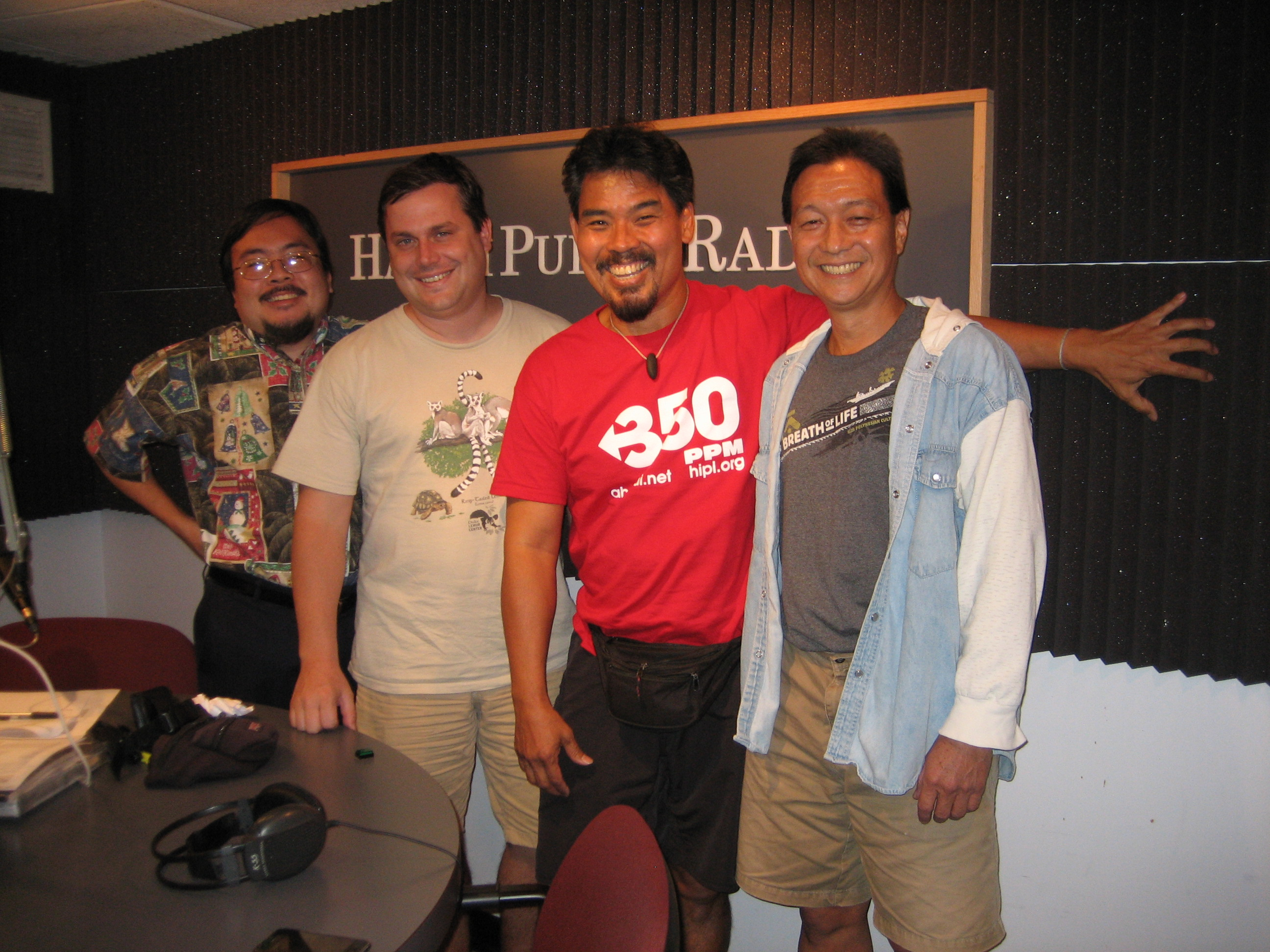
- Sam Gon (second from right)
- Education: Bachelor's in Zoology at University of Hawaii at Manoa. Master's in Zoology and PhD in Animal Behavior at University of California at Davis.
- Occupations: Senior Scientist and Cultural Advisor, The Nature Conservancy of Hawaiʻi and Palmyra

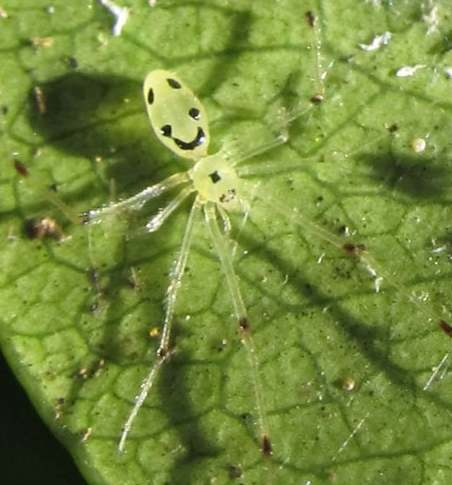
A Theridion grallator, also known as the happy-face spider, an endemic species to the Hawaiian Archipelago

Samuel M. ʻOhukaniʻōhiʻa Gon III is an American scientist and Hawaiian cultural practitioner, currently serving as Senior Scientist and Cultural Advisor for The Nature Conservancy of Hawaiʻi. He was born and raised in Nuʻuanu on the island of Oʻahu. Gon studied Hawaiian culture under Kumu John Keolamalaʻāinana Lake. Gon works to integrate Hawaiian culture, values, and knowledge into conservation efforts, for which he was named a Living Treasure of Hawaii by the Honpa Hongwanji Mission of Hawaii for his contributions towards preserving Hawaiian culture and Hawaiian ecology.

== Early life ==
Gon was born in Honolulu Hawaiʻi on December 16, 1955, and graduated in 1973 from McKinley High School and earned a Bachelor's in Zoology (1978) at the University of Hawaii at Manoa. He continued his education at the University of California at Davis earning his Master's in Zoology (1980) and a PhD in animal behavior (1984), studying the Happy-face Spider, Theridion grallator.

== Career ==
After attaining his Ph.D., Gon worked for a year in the Entomology Department of the Bernice Pauahi Bishop Museum in Honolulu, before being hired by The Nature Conservancy of Hawaii in 1986. In that organization, he served as an exploratory ecologist (1986-1990), Director of the Hawaiʻi Natural Heritage Program (1991-2002), and Senior Scientist and Cultural Advisor (2003-present) through his career, he orchestrated research and initiatives that supported The Conservancyʻs work to preserve Hawaii's biodiversity. Gon managed biological inventories for the Conservancy and the state of Hawaii.

His work as the Director of the Hawaiʻi Natural Heritage Program directed a team of biologists and data managers working to protect the rarest endemic species and ecosystems across all of the Hawaiian Islands by tracking their locations, management needs, and protection status. Later, he worked with the Conservancy's island programs strengthening conservation and management strategies. Gon helped establish ecological analysis and biodiversity data management systems for projects in East Asia, Latin America, Polynesia, and Micronesia. In 1991, Sam sailed on Hōkūleʻa around the Hawaiian Islands. He served on the board of the Ōhi'a Project, focused on Hawaiʻi's endemic and most abundant native tree. He was an executive committee member of the Hawaiian Conservation Alliance. Gon was a board member for Ahahui Malama i ka Lokahi which is a native Hawaiian organization conserving native plants and animals in Hawaii, and for the Kahoʻolawe Island Reserve Commission with a focus on habitat restoration. In 2015, while Gon was a part of the Board of Land and Natural Resources, he was an advocate for the protection of the native species, such as Oʻopu (Awaous stamineus) at risk of extinction.

Biocultural Conservation

Gon has been a strong advocate for biocultural conservation, melding indigenous Hawaiian knowledge, values, and practices into mainstream conservation. With the Hawaiʻi Conservation Alliance, he drafted the alliance's position paper on Hawaiian Culture in Conservation in Hawaiʻi, providing guidance to all conservation partners in multiple sectors (government, academia, and NGO) on integrating Hawaiian culture into conventional conservation practice. [section requires expansion and citations]

== Research, publications and speeches ==
Gon has given numerous presentations about Hawaiian ecosystems and culture to global audiences, such as the Smithsonian Institution's Museum of the American Indian, the Ethnological Museum in Dalem, Berlin, Germany (2011), the National Museum of Natural History in Paris (2012), and the Museum of World Culture in Paris, France (2014)^{.}

In 2014 Gon gave a TedTalk on Maui on combining science and Hawaiian cultural practices. Gon and colleagues at The Nature Conservancy of Hawaiʻi and the Office of Hawaiian Affairs contributed to a collaborative effort calculating the ecological footprint of pre-contact Hawaiʻi.

Gon has published many articles on Hawaiian natural history, conservation biology, landscape history, biocultural conservation, and sustainability, including [list of publications requires reorganization and corrections] altitudinal effects on the general diversity of endemic insect communities in Leeward Hawaiian forests (1978), invertebrate domestication (1984), water bears (1986), endemic Hawaiian plants (1987; 2008), sex-biased pattern variations in birds of prey (2003), applications of traditional Hawaiian knowledge (2008), using historic human ecological footprints to inform biocultural restoration and sustainability (2018), the Hawaiian Renaissance and global sustainability (2019), optimizing ecosystem services (2020), conservation of subterranean biomes (2021), and methodologies for exploring indigenous conceptualizations of nature and conservation (2022).

He is also the creator of a globally-recognized website on trilobite classification and biology Trilobites.info A Guide to the Orders of Trilobites

=== Publications ===
- Gon, Samuel M.; Price, Edward O. (October 1984). "Invertebrate Domestication: Behavioral Considerations". BioScience. 34 (9): 575–579. doi:10.2307/1309600. JSTOR 1309600. Archived from the original on April 30, 2023.
- Gon, S. M. Iii; Kimsey, R. A.; Schuster, R. O.; Willis, M. A. (June 1986). "A prodromus of the water bear fauna of Haleakala National Park". hdl:10125/18495.
- Nagata, Kenneth M.; Gon, S. (1987). "Sanicula mariversa (Apiaceae), a New Species from 'Ohikilolo Ridge, Wai'anae Mountains, O'ahu in the Hawaiian Archipelago". Systematic Botany. 12 (3): 406–409. Bibcode:1987SysBo..12..406N. doi:10.2307/2419265. JSTOR 2419265. S2CID 87795637.
- Baird, Amy B.; Braun, Janet K.; Mares, Michael A.; Morales, Juan Carlos; Patton, John C.; Tran, Christina Q.; Bickham, John W. (2015). "Molecular systematic revision of tree bats (Lasiurini): doubling the native mammals of the Hawaiian Islands". Journal of Mammalogy. 96 (6): 1255–1274. doi:10.1093/jmammal/gyv135. ISSN 0022-2372. JSTOR 26373001.
- "A Pictorical Guide to the Orders of Trilobites - Anna's Archive". annas-archive.org.
- Iii, Samuel M. Gon (2003). "Application of Traditional Ecological Knowledge and Practices of Indigenous Hawaiians to Re-vegetation of Kaho'olawe". Ethnobotany Research and Applications. 1: 005–020. ISSN 1547-3465.
- Lin, Jih-Pai; Gon, S.; Gehling, J.; Babcock, L.; Zhao, Yuan-long; Zhang, Xingliang; Hu, Shi-xue; Yuan, Jinliang; Yu, M.; Peng, Jin (2006). "A Parvancorina-like arthropod from the Cambrian of South China". Historical Biology. 18 (1): 33–45. Bibcode:2006HBio...18...33L. doi:10.1080/08912960500508689. S2CID 85821717.
- "Mapping Plant Species Ranges in the Hawaiian Islands; Developing a Methodology and Associated GIS Layers". pubs.usgs.gov.
- Ladefoged, Thegn N.; Kirch, Patrick V.; Gon, Samuel M.; Chadwick, Oliver A.; Hartshorn, Anthony S.; Vitousek, Peter M. (2009). "Opportunities and constraints for intensive agriculture in the Hawaiian archipelago prior to European contact". Journal of Archaeological Science. 10 (36): 2374–2383. Bibcode:2009JArSc..36.2374L. doi:10.1016/j.jas.2009.06.030. ISSN 0305-4403.
- Fortini, Lucas; Price, Jonathan; Jacobi, James; Vorsino, Adam; Burgett, Jeff; Brinck, Kevin; Amidon, Fred; Miller, Steve; Gon III, Sam; Koob, Gregory; Paxton, Eben (January 25, 2016). "A landscape-based assessment of climate change vulnerability for all native plants". hdl:10790/2620.
- Winter, Kawika; Lincoln, Noa; Berkes, Fikret; Alegado, Rosanna; Kurashima, Natalie; Frank, Kiana; Pascua, Puaʻala; Rii, Yoshimi; Reppun, Frederick; Knapp, Ingrid; McClatchey, Will; Ticktin, Tamara; Smith, Celia; Franklin, Erik; Oleson, Kirsten (June 27, 2020). "Ecomimicry in Indigenous resource management: optimizing ecosystem services to achieve resource abundance, with examples from Hawaiʻi". Ecology and Society. 25 (2) art26. doi:10.5751/ES-11539-250226. ISSN 1708-3087. S2CID 220126676.
