= Ed Greevy =

American photographer

Edward W. Greevy III is an American photographer. He is best known for his coverage of protests movements in Hawaiʻi.

== Biography ==
Greevy was born in 1939 in Los Angeles. He first visited Hawaii in 1960, while attending Long Beach State University. He moved to Hawaiʻi in 1962, but soon moved back to the mainland where he worked in insurance in New York City. He had aspirations of being a surf photographer, so in 1966 he founded a magazine called Competition Surf with his brother in law. The magazine folded in 1967.

After returning to Hawaii in 1967, Greevy began working in commercial photography before moving to documenting protests and land struggles he is now known for. Greevy started with Save Our Surf, when he documented the Kalama Valley protests, the Waiāhole-Waikāne struggle, and the Kahoʻolawe protests. Greevy and Save Our Surf founder, John Kelly, met on March 31, 1971, where Greevy photographed a demonstration at the Hawaiʻi State Capitol by Save Our Surf and Kōkua Hawaiʻi, who were there to raise concerns over the widening of Kūhiō Beach and the Kalama Valley evictions. He credits Kelly with bringing him to many later protests and demonstrations.

== Style ==
Greevy's photographs were known for depicting the struggles of those who were defending their homes and land while maintaining their dignity in the face of these situations. Activist Trisha Kehaulani Watson said that Greevy's work changed the perception of Native Hawaiians. Throughout his career he has taken an estimated 60,000 photographs.
