= Onipaʻa Peace March =

Annual event in Hawaiʻi, United States

The Onipaʻa Peace March is an annual event and procession from Mauna Ala (the Hawaiian Royal Mausoleum) to the ʻIolani Palace to commemorate Liliʻuokalani's forced removal from the throne and mark the moment of overthrow of the Hawaiian Kingdom in 1893.

== History and background ==
=== 1893 ===
On July 6, 1846, U.S. Secretary of State John C. Calhoun, on behalf of President Tyler, afforded formal recognition of Hawaiian independence under the reign of Kamehameha III. As a result of the recognition of Hawaiian independence, the Hawaiian Kingdom entered into treaties with the major nations of the world and established over ninety legations and consulates in multiple seaports and cities. The Kamehameha Dynasty was the reigning monarchy of the Kingdom of Hawaiʻi, beginning with its founding by Kamehameha I in 1795, until the death of Kamehameha V in 1872 and Lunalilo in 1874. The kingdom would continue under the House of Kalākaua for another 21 years until its overthrow in 1893, when a coup d'état against Queen Liliʻuokalani was supported by U.S. Marines.

=== 1993 ===
On January 17, 1993, a march was held from the Aloha Tower to the ʻIolani Palace to commemorate the 100th anniversary of the "illegal overthrow of the Kingdom of Hawaii." The march of 15,000 people was led by the Ka Lāhui and was part of the ʻOnipaʻa, an observance of the queen's overthrow. The 1993 observance took its name from Queen Liliʻuokalani's motto, "ʻOnipaʻa" (to remain steadfast). 20,000 people are estimated to have met at the palace for a series of events that included a re-enactment of the overthrow and speeches from activists. Haunani-Kay Trask and others from the University of Hawaiʻi at Mānoa worked closely with film-makers Puhipau and Joan Lander of the production company Nā Maka o ka 'Āina to create the film "Act of War: The Overthrow of the Hawaiian Nation". The film helped bring the findings of Hawaiian historians like Trask, Jonathan Kamakawiwoʻole Osorio and Lilikalā Kameʻeleihiwa to a larger and broader audience. In 1993, Trask also released her book From a Native Daughter: Colonialism and Sovereignty in Hawaiʻi that dealt with such topics as corporate tourism, academic exploitation, suppression of Native epistemology and histories as well as the high number of ancient sites including burials that have been destroyed. Trask is credited with one of the more controversial remarks from that day, stating in her speech, "We are not Americans. Say it in your heart. Say it in your sleep. We will never forget what the Americans have done to us—never, never, never. The Americans, my people, are our enemies." An image from the cover of her book shows the 1993 march as it neared the palace taken by photographer Ed Greevy. Honolulu-Star Advertiser photographer Bruce Asato also captured the moment which appeared on the front page of the newspaper. The image depicts the organizers of the march stopping to allow elders to enter the grounds of the palace first.

Marking the 122nd anniversary of the overthrow, activists organized the "Queen Liliʻuokalani Kingdom Restoration Spiritual Walk" in 2015, beginning the march from Mauna Ala (the Royal Mausoleum) down to the ʻIolani Palace, to Liliʻuokalani's statue and then to the capital rotunda. Organizer's concerns included crown lands being sold illegally, the desecration of sacred grounds and the moving of ancient burials for the ongoing rail project.

== 2018 march and commemoration ==
=== Preparation ===
When a false nuclear ballistic missile alert went off 4 days before the event, one of the organizers, Kaukaohu Wahilani, mentioned how the US military is linked to colonialism: "It was only through the might of the American military that the overthrow was successful". The event, ʻOnipaʻa Kākou, made a solemn day a memorable event featuring a rally after the march with speeches and hula and ceremonial protocols and prayers. Beginning one week before the event, Hinaleimoana Wong began holding the Mana Ka Lahui Mele Workshops for the community to learn songs being used during the day. University of Hawaiʻi at Mānoa students participated and helped print specially designed T-shirts created by Tita Coloma just for the day.

=== March ===
The full event began with protocol observances at Mauna Ala with a march to the palace for the flag raising and then to the statue of Queen Liliʻuokalani where ceremonial offerings were made. The crowd entered through the main gates of the palace grounds as oli (chants) were performed and participants carried torches, Hawaiian flags and two purple Kāhili which were carried alongside a marcher carrying Queen Liliʻuokalani's portrait.
