= Native Hawaiian activism =

List of major movements in Native Hawaiian history

Native Hawaiian activism has a long history. This article lists major movements in Native Hawaiian history, but does not include movements in the Hawaiian Islands conducted by non-indigenous people like the Oʻahu Sugar Strike of 1920.

== Kūʻē Petitions ==
The Kūʻē Petitions, also known as the Anti-Annexation Petitions, is a collection of signatures from 1897-1898 of Hawaiian subjects who opposed annexation of the Kingdom of Hawaiʻi by the United States. The signatures were collected by Hui Hawai‘i Aloha ‘Āina; its members traveled by foot, horseback, and boat from island to island to collect over 21,000 signatures. The petitions, hand-delivered to the United States Senate in Washington, D.C., persuaded members of Congress not to sign a Treaty of Annexation of Hawaiʻi.

== Kalama Valley ==
The Kalama Valley is located on the east side of Oʻahu, and was owned by Bishop Estate during the protests of the 1970s. The land could be sold and used in any way that allowed for the best possible outcome in regards to the school funding and general school project. This resulted in the temporary lease structure and eventual eviction of pig farmers and other small scale tenants. Many of these tenants were Hawaiian in ancestry, and most were poor. The existence of the Kalama Valley area served as a form of slow-paced communal living, with many holding that their living status was purposefully anti-suburban and resistant to "the suburbanite's desire for neat lawns, fancy houses expensive cars, big fences, and unseen neighbors."

The project began to pick up speed with the Estate notifying more than 51 people of their eviction and the following announcement that those people would need to find new housing. To oversee the demolition of the Kalama Valley residences and the completion of the eviction process, Ed Michael was hired by the Estate. He is quoted as saying, "in today's modern world, the Hawaiian lifestyle should be illegal". In response to the development and escalating tension, Larry Kamakawiwoʻole called together Pete Thompson, "Soli" Niheu, Kalani Ohelo, and other noted student activists to begin protests against the evictions. The most famous of these would be Pete Thompson, who would play a major role in the later Waiāhole-Waikāne protests. These organizers formed the Kokua Kalama Committee (KKC) and would be part of the first wave of resistance to the early demolition. One of the people arrested in the first struggle was Kehau Lee, a scholar and university professor whose fundamental praxis involved Maoist theory and the development of "Third World" consciousness in regards to Native Hawaiian struggles. Many of the activists saw their struggle as similar to that of the Blank Panthers and Young Lords, especially in regard to the struggle for Puerto Rican autonomy.

The protests began with the eviction of many of the residents, followed by lines of bulldozers destroying what was left of many people's homes. This was due to the fact that much of the land was to be repurposed for development projects. These development projects were sponsored and connected to the Big Five, the grouping of corporations that had come to dominate Hawaiian life and politics from before the creation of its territory status. This project was projected to be highly profitable for the Bishop Estate and would go towards the education of Native Hawaiians. George Santos, on the other hand, became a huge proponent against the development, arguing about the right to land for native people and locals, and discussing the long-standing connection that many had to the place. While traveling around the state during the peak of the movement, he warned of rich people coming in from the continental United States and pushing out more and more Hawaiian locals and Natives. Ultimately many of the activists would find themselves arrested and moved aside, and the evictions and demolitions would go forward. This movement, however, is credited as being the renaissance of the Hawaiian activism movement, and the birthplace of much of the organizing structure that would come to operate and symbolize Native Hawaiian resistance.

== Kahoʻolawe ==
After the attack on Puʻuloa, Pearl Harbor, in 1941, the U.S. Federal government seized control of the island of Kahoʻolawe to run military exercises and bombing practice. In 1976, members of Protect Kahoʻolawe ʻOhana, including George Helm and Walter Ritte, began peaceful occupations of the island to stop the bombing.

== Waiāhole-Waikāne ==
This Waiāhole-Waikāne struggle was one of the most successful movements in Native Hawaiian resistance and later led to other similar offshoot offenses. Much of the effort culminated in the blocking of the federal highway, which caused mass traffic disturbance. This was done to raise public awareness of the mass eviction, which was being done for the creation of a 700-unit condominium and apartment complex on the island of Oʻahu. There were also numerous protests and marches across the island, with residents pushing for an end to the evictions and in many cases for long-term leases. The state would ultimately relent to the protestors' demands and would step in to stop the development. Governor Ben Cayetano granted many of the residents 55-year leases, which would have entitled them to live on the land for years to come. After much assurances, they were ultimately signed by the most Native residents and marked another victory in the resistance to land displacement.

One thing to note here is that there is an emergent pattern of music within the Native Hawaiian activism structure as well as a much larger audio inclusion of Native Hawaiian culture. This use of music helped to connect the continual resistance as well as grounded it in Native culture.

== Hilo Airport ==
The Hilo Airport protest was a small scale event with roughly 50 people who used ceremonial music and spatial occupation to create disturbance in the normal affairs of the airport. This was due to the expansion of the Hilo Airport on indigenous land without proper consultation of indigenous people or the Native Hawaiian Organizations that serve as de facto representatives. This protest lasted a short time but proved that even infractions of sovereignty deemed small would be met with resistance.

== Mākua Valley ==
The event was triggered by numerous evictions in the Mākua Valley on the island of Oʻahu, and was followed by dozens of more threats, with the main targets being Native Hawaiians who had lived there for fifty years or longer. These evictions led to numerous sit-ins and camp-ins with approximately 16 protestors arrested. Much of this action was started in the 60's, but the two major events happened with the mass arrests and disturbance that occurred on January 20, 1983, and the mass eviction in January 1996. This mass eviction is particularly notable, because the Governor at the time, Ben Cayetano, kept the media from reporting, and even went as far as threatening to arrest and suppress the press should the try to report on the event.

== Haleakalā and Mauna Kea ==
Protestors have clashed with astronomers and the United States government over the construction of the Thirty Meter Telescope, and its location on the sacred mountains of Haleakalā and Mauna Kea. The initial movement led to the arrest of six protesters, which spurred further outrage about the suppression of free speech and the suppression of Native Hawaiian voices. This Native Hawaiian voice was further suppressed when one of the protesters, Samuel Kaleikoa Kaʻeo, spoke in Hawaiian during his trial, leading to a further charge from the judge. This effort against the Thirty Meter Telescope is an ongoing movement and reflects a tradition of resistance and continual struggle by the Native Hawaiian people to protect their homelands and preserve their sacred sites. The telescope has so far been pushed back, but the government and the groups of astronomers pushing the project have not given up on the project.
