= Pete Thompson (professor) =

Pete Kaululaʻau Gustave Thompson (1949 – March 2, 2015) was an activist and professor in the Ethnic Studies department at the University of Hawaiʻi at Mānoa. He is best known for his work in the Waiāhole-Waikāne struggle and the protests against constructing the Interstate H-3.

== Early life and education ==
Thompson was born in Honolulu in 1949. He graduated from Kamehameha Schools in 1967.

== Career ==
As a professor, Thompson helped to write the first curriculum about Native Hawaiians to be taught at the University of Hawaiʻi at Mānoa. He also did most of his activism while working as a professor, including acting as a founding member of the Kokua Kalama Committee and as chairman of "For People, Land and Sea, Stop TH-3," a community opposing the development of the Interstate H-3. He was well-known as a Marxist and a community organizer with the Waiāhole-Waikāne Community Association. Thompson's interest and support of land rights extended into the greater Pacific, with his attendance at events like the conference in 1974/1975 for a Nuclear Free Pacific.

After working as a professor, he became an investment broker at Smith Barney, ranking 51st in the United States in 2008. He also served as a board member for the Hawaii People’s Fund and the Hawaii Institute of Public Affairs.

Thompson died on March 2, 2015.
