= List of Harold Keables honorees =

Established in honor of the late Harold Keables, every year since 1986, with the exception of 1988–89, ʻIolani School honors an academic by allowing for them to be the Harold Keables Chair of English. For two weeks, recipients work to aid and supplement students writing abilities, work with faculty, and give a speech in weekly chapel sessions. Introduced in 2018, The Harold Keables Scholars introduces well-versed intellectuals to speak to students about the world of writing and the power vested within it.

== Honorees ==
=== Harold Keables Chairs of English ===
Year	Holder
1986	Robert Palazzi
1987	Allan Glatthorn
1988	None awarded
1989	None awarded
1990	Donald Murray
1991	Thomas Newkirk
1992	Donald Johnson
1993	Jane Hansen
1994	Jack Higgs
1995	Georgia Heard
1996	Joan Countryman
1997	Jane Schaffer
1998	Paul Watkins
1999	Jeff Gere and Ruth Stotter
2000	Oregon Shakespeare Festival
2001	Ellen Greenblatt and Eric Rothschild
2002	Li-Young Lee
2003	Neil Campbell
2004	David Mas Masumoto
2005	Lee Cataluna
2006	Robert O'Meally
2007	Billy Collins
2008	Scott Kim
2009	Peter Saccio
2010	Cheryl Hayashi
2011	David Horsey
2012	Taylor Mali
2013	Alexandra Fuller
2014	Sherry Ott
2015	Sarah Kay
2016	Sujata Massey
2017	Richard Blanco
2018	Aaron Kandell and Jordan Kandell
2019	Nate Chinen
2020	Erin Entrada Kelly
2021	Juan Felipe Herrera
2022	Aimee Nezhukumatathil
2023	Dr. Jon Osorio and Dr. Jamaica Osorio
2024	Naomi Shihab Nye
2025	Elizabeth Acevedo

=== Harold Keables Scholars ===
Year	Holder
2018	Jelani Cobb
2019	Jack Gantos
2020	Fall Keables Speaker Series: Bernard Lafayette, Peniel E. Joseph, Clint Smith, David Treuer, Adriane Lentz-Smith, Jon Kamakawiwo'ole Osorio, Jamaica Osorio, Lee Cataluna, Nate Chinen, Ambrose Akinmusire, Jelani Cobb, Timothy Naftali
2021	Helen Zia
2022	Jamelle Bouie
2023-2024	Dr. Imani Perry and Dr. Robin D.G. Kelley
2024-2025	Eric Kim and Cathy Park Hong

== Notes ==
Listed in order of appearance
