= Aloha ʻĀina =

"love of the land", a central idea of Native Hawaiian thought

Aloha ʻĀina, which means "love of the land", is a central idea of Native Hawaiian thought, cosmology and culture. Aloha ʻāina brings a perspective that pervades many aspects of life. Its ecological and cultural orientations are founded upon a sense of being connected to all living things. This mutuality between all things exists on many levels: spiritual, social, and the scientific.

Aloha ʻĀina also means Hawaiian patriotism; love for the land and its people. It is an in-depth relationship between the places and communities that hold significance to the individual. As such, it is an ethic that includes striving to improve the well-being of Hawaiʻi and engaging in experiences that foster aloha for and life-long allegiance to ka lāhui Hawaiʻi and ka pae ʻāina o Hawaiʻi. According to Jon Osorio, Professor at the Kamakakūokalani Center for Hawaiian Studies: “Aloha ‘āina is a relationship not just with the land but really with nature itself and in particular that part of the land and sea and streams and water that actually sustains life. ‘Āi is the word that means to eat and when we say ‘āina we’re talking basically about what it is that feeds not just humans but basically everything, and everything is directly dependent and interdependent with the ‘āina.”

== History ==
Traditionally, the concept goes back to mythical times, and is illustrated extensively in creation chants such as the Kumulipo, which emphasize the connection between the land and the people. In everyday practice, it embodies a deep passion for the land, as is often demonstrated in songs, hula, stories and lifestyle practices such as farming, which have many celebratory and sometimes sensual elements. As a political term, it came into wide use during the late nineteenth century through the Aloha ʻĀina Party, which transformed into the Home Rule Party of Hawaii in 1900, after the annexation of Hawaiʻi in the last decade of the 19th century. Since that time some connotations of Hawaiian nationalism are associated with the term. Many practitioners, however, assert that Aloha ʻĀina is not itself a political term but rather a tenet of spiritual and cultural understanding which "drives one into action" (George Helm, 1977). These actions may be political, or may simply involve prayer, lifestyle choices and love and respect for the land and sea.

=== Hawaiian Renaissance ===
During the "Hawaiian Renaissance" of the 1970s, the term again came into common use, and a social movement arose based upon it. Land struggles were the locus of this movement, which brought together ecological principles, ancient practices, historical interests, demilitarization/peace concepts and Hawaiian Sovereignty claims.

The pinnacle of this movement came in 1976–77, with the occupation of the island of Kahoʻolawe by the group PKO (Protect Kahoʻolawe ʻOhana). Kahoʻolawe had been used as training area for the military since World War II, and was still an active bombing practice range for the U.S. Navy at the time. The PKO planned to "complete five landings symbolizing the five fingers of limahana (the working hand)." A group of activists, kupuna (elders) and cultural practitioners led by Kawaipuna Prejean and George Helm, a lauded Hawaiian singer, musician and speaker from Molokai reached the island by boat, but were later arrested. They returned, and two of the group, Walter Ritte and Richard Sawyer, were left behind on the waterless island when the others were again removed. Helm, who had become the group's leader and a hero to many, paddled the 7 miles from Maui on a surfboard, along with Kimo Mitchell in an attempt to return to Kahoʻolawe. The pair disappeared and Helm's body was never found. The Navy later ended its use of Kahoʻolawe and funded a still-incomplete program to remove unexploded ordnance from the island.

=== Modern movement ===
The Aloha ʻĀina movement later focused on the growing of kalo, or Hawaiian taro. Kalo is a sacred plant in traditional Hawaiian culture, believed to be the elder sibling of the first humans, and the plant from which poi is made. Kalo requires copious water and is very sensitive to pollutants (hence, urbanization); therefore, anti-development and water rights struggles are ubiquitous elements of traditional kalo culture. Kalo culture relates directly to health issues; studies have shown very high rates of heart disease, diabetes, many cancers, and most other preventable, diet-related diseases among native Hawaiians, and a major factor in these statistics is suspected to be the abandonment of traditional dietary practices. The goals of Aloha ʻĀina include the harmonization of human health with the health of the land, through the culturally pono (righteous) protection and care of the natural resources that sustain it.

Later issues of concern for the Aloha ʻĀina movement include the contested creation of a genetically modified taro variety.

== Aloha ʻĀina in education ==
Today, Hawaiian culture-based education implements traditional Hawaiian knowledge of ʻāina as a vital element to reconnect educators and students back to the ʻāina. The Native Hawaiian educational movement seeks to reestablish and reclaim Native Hawaiian cultural knowledge, land, and more positive educational experiences. This is essential in stripping away the colonial educational systems that have repressed Native Hawaiian identity, knowledge, and culture. Place-based learning in charter schools have influenced Native Hawaiian learners experiences and success in school. Hawaiian schools have addressed educational inequalities, improved students' social emotional health, test scores, community and family engagement, and the underrepresentation of Native teachers and school leaders better than public schools.

Hawaiian culture-based schools have been working towards restoring the holistic health of Hawaiian communities and nationhood. Hālau Kū Māna is an accredited Hawaiian culture-based public charter school founded in 1999. As one of the foundations of the Hawaiian resistance, aloha ʻāina has been one of the ethical practices that educators in Hālau Kū Māna have sought to base their curriculum and educational programs. Aloha ʻāina reestablishes acceptance and implementation of traditional values and connects people back to the ʻāīna. Aloha ʻāina also expresses the commitment to the protection and maintenance of the wellbeing of the natural world and political autonomy. Sovereign pedagogies recognizes the importance of sovereignty on a personal and collective level for the wellbeing and learning of indigenous people. Pedagogies of aloha ʻāina implemented by educators in Hālau Kū Māna, have allowed students to cultivate meaningful relationships with the places they are visiting and working on, while at the same time examining and studying the natural world. ʻĀina-based pedagogies have also taught students to acknowledge and actively communicate with the ʻāina that is living, through chants, gifts, and work. As part of the holistic practice of aloha ʻāina in Hālau Kū Māna, educators engage students with contemporary Hawaiian politics, to allow them to confront controversial social issues. Social movements in Hawaii can assure people who are marginalized and oppressed can secure authority over their educational futures. Aloha ʻāina has been a practice of Kanaka Maoli survivance that helped to develop the Hawaiian sovereignty movement. It is also part of the Hawaiian consciousness that is a symbol of cultural identity that helps to unite Hawaiians. The teaching, learning, and mastery of reading, writing, and printing for Hawaiians has enabled them to capture and preserve older knowledge forms that would have been lost. This has also helped to create new ways to express aloha ʻāina in new frameworks and rebuild the nation.
