= Nadao (name) =

Nadao is a given name and surname. Notable people with the name include:

- Hirokichi Nadao, Japanese politician
- Nadao Yoshinaga, American politician
