= Jamaica Osorio =

Hawaiian activist, academic and poet

- Born: Jamaica Heolimeleikalani Osorio; Pālolo, Oʻahu, Hawaii, U.S.
- Education: Kamehameha Schools; Stanford University (BA); New York University (MA); University of Hawaiʻi at Mānoa (PhD)
- Occupations: Poet; educator; activist; scholar
- Employer: University of Hawaiʻi at Mānoa
- Notable work: Remembering Our Intimacies: Moʻolelo, Aloha ʻĀina, and Ea (2021) "Kumulipo" (2009)
- Title: Associate Professor of Indigenous and Native Hawaiian Politics
- Parent(s): Jonathan Osorio; Mary Osorio
- Awards: Youth Speaks Grand Slam Champion (2009); Brave New Voices Champion

Jamaica Heolimeleikalani Osorio is a Kānaka Maoli poet, educator, and activist who lives and works in Hawai'i. She is known for her poetry and activism centered on Hawaiian culture and identity.

== Early life ==
Osorio was born and raised in Pālolo Valley, Oahu to parents Jonathan Osorio and Mary Osorio. From a young age, Osorio was also inspired by the work her father did as a professor, and knew she wanted to teach at a university. By virtue of her father's job, Osorio grew up around renowned scholars, creatives and activists, such as Haunani-Kay Trask and Lilikalā Kame'eleihiwa, and was further inspired by the vision of wāhine they evoked.

== Education and academic work ==
Osorio graduated from Kamehameha Schools in 2008, and from Stanford University in 2012 with a Bachelor of Arts in Comparative Studies in Race and Ethnicity. The following year, she completed a Master of Arts in Art and Politics at New York University. In 2017, Osorio received a Ford Foundation Fellowship, and in 2018, she earned her Doctor of Philosophy at the University of Hawai'i at Mānoa from the Department of English with her dissertation entitled, “(Re)membering ʻUpena of Intimacies: A Kanaka Maoli Moʻolelo Beyond Queer Theory.” Osorio's research centred primarily around the Hawaiian Goddess Hi'iakaikapoliopele, who had an intimate female friend and lover, Hopoe. She found she could connect with these ancient legends, which helped her come to terms with her sexuality. Her Ph.D. dissertation opens with a poem entitled “He Mele No Hōpoe: A Dedication." Written from Hi'iaka's perspective, the poem speaks to Hi'iaka's relationship with Hopoe, and how their story has been co-opted and caricatured by colonists like Emerson and Westervelt.

As of 2025, she is Associate Professor of Indigenous and Native Hawaiian Politics at the University of Hawai'i at Mānoa.

== Poetry ==
Jamaica Osorio performs "Kumulipo" at the White House Poetry Jam on November 2, 2009.

Osorio has been a three-time national poetry champion, including winning the 2009 Youth Speaks Grand Slam Championship and winner of the international youth poetry competition, Brave New Voices, which lead to an HBO documentary with the same name. At the first ever White House Poetry Jam in 2009, an 18-year-old Osorio performed a poem she wrote entitled "Kumulipo" before Barack Obama and the First Family. "Kumulipo" laments the loss of Hawaiian identity in the face of colonisation and American imperialism.

Osorio was initially insecure about her grammar and spelling. As a result, she did not want people to read her poetry, she just wanted to perform her work. Slam poetry allowed her to do just that and it resembled the chanting and oral traditions of Hawaiian culture and ancestry which also appealed to her.

== Activism ==
Osorio is also known for her activism concerning multiple topics. She is the subject of the poetic short This is the Way We Rise by Ciara Lacy. The film was screened in the 2021 Sundance Film Festival and centers on Osorio within the context of the Thirty Meter Telescope protests on Mauna Kea. The film is also part of a PBS Series called In the Making. She has also spoken about the symbolism of the American flag in Hawaii, Hawaii and the COVID-19 pandemic, and topics including global warming and rising sea levels which she spoke about during her 2013 TEDx Mānoa talk. Her poems "He Mana Kō ka Leo" and "Kumulipo" have been presented as an example of how the next generation of artists is giving voice to the Hawaiian nation.

== Selected works ==
- Osorio, Jamaica Heolimeleikalani (2021). Remembering our intimacies : moʻolelo, aloha ʻāina, and ea. Minneapolis. ISBN 978-1-4529-6476-8. OCLC 1260692294.
- Osorio's poem Kumulipo - selected as one of seven must-read Hawai'i poems by Honolulu Magazine
