= Mililani Trask =

Hawaiian activist, political speaker and attorney

Mililani B. Trask
- Trask in 2014

Member of the Office of Hawaiian Affairs Board of Trustees
- In office February 24, 2022 – December 5, 2024
- Succeeded by: Kai Kahele
- Constituency: Hawaiʻi Island Trustee

Personal details
- Born: Mililani Bernardette Trask; 1951 (age 74–75) Honolulu, Hawaii, US
- Education: [[[San Jose State University]] (BA); Santa Clara University School of Law (JD)
- Occupation: Indigenous Consultants LLC (2009–Present), Executive Director, Gibson Foundation (1988–2004), Consultant to World Indigenous Peoples

Mililani Bernardette Trask is a Native Hawaiian leader, political speaker, and attorney. One of Trask's contributions to the Hawaiian sovereignty movement was her founding of Na Koa Ikaika o Ka Lāhui Hawaiʻi, a native Hawaiian non-governmental organization focusing on cultural, social, and economic development, education, health, housing, land entitlements, energy, and water issues.

Outside of Hawaiʻi, Trask has worked with the United Nations to aid indigenous people from around the world seeking independence. She was a member of the Indigenous Initiative for Peace, helped author the United Nations Declaration on the Rights of Indigenous Peoples and was elected vice chair of the General Assembly of Nations of the Unrepresented Nations and Peoples Organization. For seven years, she worked and studied under the guidance of Mother Teresa of Calcutta.

== Early life and family background ==
Mililani Trask was born on the island of Oʻahu in Honolulu, Hawaiʻi, and she has four siblings. Mililani's mother, Haunani Cooper, was a school teacher and Haunani’s mother, Iwalani Haia, worked for the Benevolent Societies on Maui while also engaging in efforts to raise awareness around the 1893 overthrow of Queen Liliʻuokalani. Mililani's father, Bernard Trask, was a lawyer. Mililani's grandfather, David Trask, was the first sheriff in Honolulu and was affiliated with the Territorial Legislature for 26 years. Her uncle, David Trask Jr., was a senator, a state representative, and a leader of the Hawaii Government Employees Association. He was credited for bringing the power of collective bargaining to the union. Her other uncle, Arthur Trask, was a lawyer and political figure for the Democratic Party who was well known for his abilities as an orator and storyteller. She is the younger sister of activist and writer, Professor Haunani-Kay Trask.

Mililani graduated from Kamehameha Schools in 1969. She attended the University of Redlands and earned her bachelor's degree in political science from San Jose State University in 1974 and her Juris Doctor from Santa Clara University School of Law in 1978.

== Office of Hawaiian Affairs ==
Mililani Trask served on the Office of Hawaiian Affairs Board of Trustees from 1998 to 2000 as a Trustee At-Large. After the passage of the Rice Decision in 2000 gave non-Hawaiians voting access in OHA elections, Mililani lost her bid for reelection despite the fact that she won the 1998 election by a previously unprecedented number of votes cast by Hawaiians since the formation of OHA in 1978. In 2016 she ran for the Big Island OHA Trustee position on the grounds that the Office of Hawaiian Affairs needed to be more accountable to its beneficiaries. In press interviews and meetings on the topic, she has addressed the need for reform and a change in leadership. Although she did not win the 2016 election, she urged Native Hawaiians to vote.

"OHA wants to retain wardship – have the state provide it with the revenue, but they are not willing to work with their own people to provide critical needs like housing and poverty alleviation. We have to stop making the goal of self-governance be the opportunity to suck at the state and federal teat. It is not that. It is economic self-sufficiency and that's where we should be going and we're not."

— Mililani Trask

Mililani Trask has stated that, because the decisions made by OHA impact all of Hawaiʻi, there needs to be more accountability and a focus on the most critical needs of Hawaiians in terms of education, housing, healthcare, incarceration, poverty and jobs instead of political campaigns. Mililani Trask also holds eighteen years of experience with ceded Hawaiian land trusts and affordable housing.

On February 24, 2022, the OHA Board of Trustees announced the selection of Mililani Trask to replace Keola Lindsey who resigned on February 1.
