= Kalama Valley protests =

1971 protest on Oahu, Hawaii

The Kalama Valley Protests occurred in 1971. The protesters were acting against the eviction of low-income farmers to redevelop the land as a resort area. The Kalama Valley Protests are known for sparking the Hawaiian Renaissance.

== Protest ==
In the 1950s Henry J. Kaiser moved to Hawaii, where he developed Hawaii Kai, a planned residential community on Oahu's southeastern coast. Hawaii Kai was next to Kalama Valley, an existing community of working-class Hawaii locals. Before Kaiser's development plan, the land was a salt-water marsh, much like Waikiki before the construction of the Ala Wai canal. The land in Kalama Valley was owned by the Bishop Trust, who leased land to farmers living in the valley. High housing costs meant that most Hawaii residents could not afford to buy a home, and many residents of the valley had previously been evicted from zones that had been designated for redevelopment.

Kalama Valley was rezoned from agricultural to urban land in 1968. Bishop Trust told the residents to leave the valley before July 1970 because they had given Kaiser permission to develop the land. The Trust began demolishing buildings in early July, but some families had not yet left the valley. They refused to leave and three protesters were arrested. Rallies were organized at the Hawaii State Capitol building, but little came of them. In the meantime, protesters moved into the valley, and eventually outnumbered the original leaseholders.

A resident and protester named George Santos became especially prominent during the protests because he and his hog farm had previously been evicted from Bishop Trust lands zoned for redevelopment. The City of Honolulu and the Bishop Trust had been told to investigate the Trust's relocation of tenants by lawmakers in 1959, but nothing was done. During the protests Senator Nadao Yoshinaga criticized the Bishop Trust and suggested that the State of Hawaii buy the land.

On May 11, 1971, a group of 32 protesters in Kalama Valley were arrested and the remaining tenants were evicted. The Trust had trouble finding trucks willing to remove the pigs from the farms, so the tenants were given access to the valley to care for their livestock until the pigs were removed two days later. A few days later, the protests resumed in front of the Bishop Trust offices.

== Aftermath ==
In the decade after the Kalama Valley protests other groups were evicted from their homes around the island. During evictions in Sand Island, protesters made it clear that by conducting these evictions, the state was removing Native Hawaiians from their lands. The evictions in Kalama Valley were seen as an attack on the slow-paced, Hawaiian way of life by (mainly white) landowners. They also sparked discussion about land rights, tenant's rights, and the struggle between locals and tourists. The Kalama Valley protests are widely considered the beginning of the Hawaiian Renaissance. Haunani-Kay Trask called the protests a "dress rehearsal" for more successful protests years later, like the Waiāhole-Waikāne protests from 1975 to 1980, and protests against the bombing of Kahoʻolawe.

== See also ==
- Kakaʻako
- Thirty Meter Telescope protests
