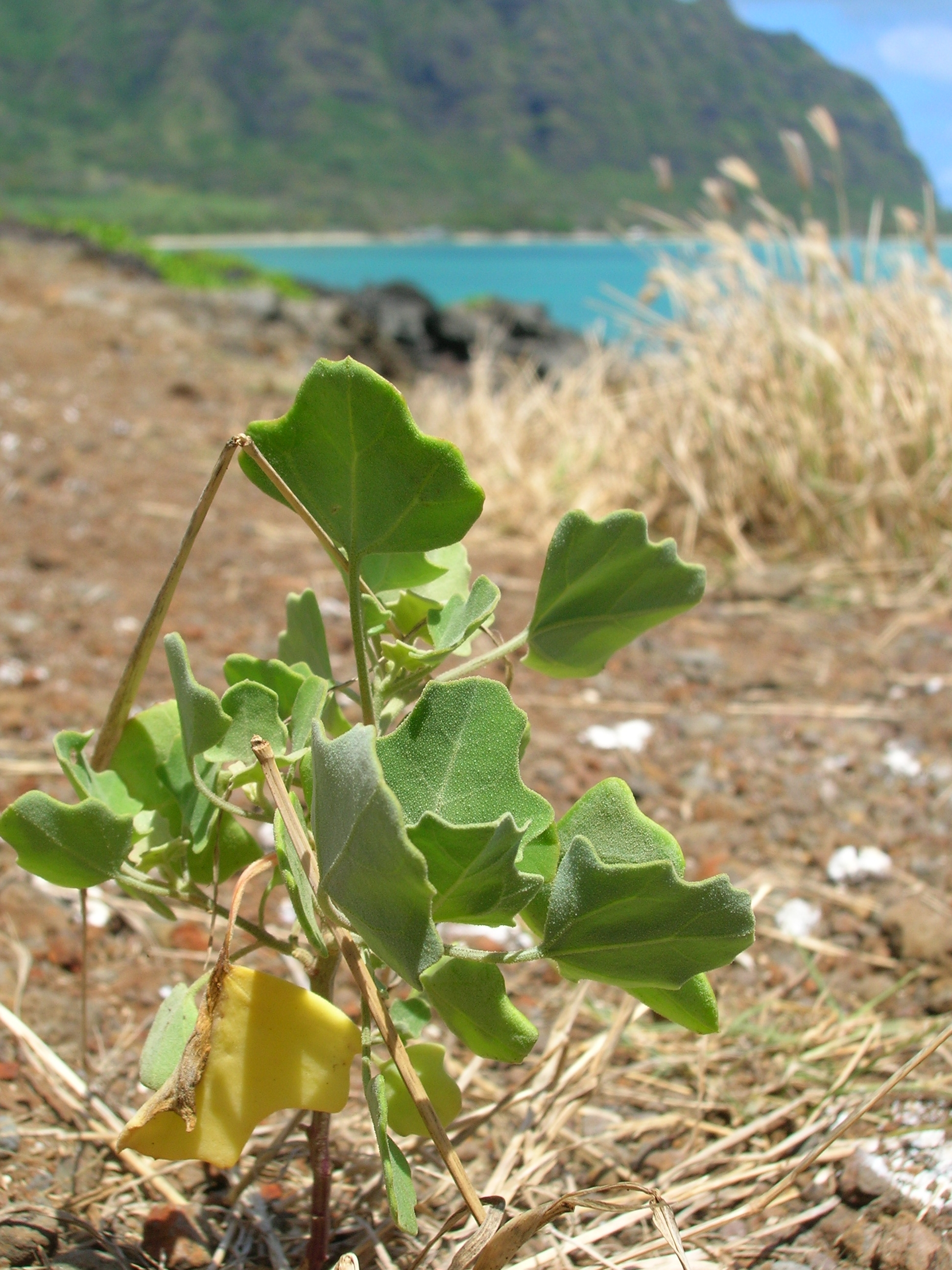

Conservation status
- Vulnerable (NatureServe)

Scientific classification
- Kingdom: Plantae
- Clade: Tracheophytes
- Clade: Angiosperms
- Clade: Eudicots
- Order: Caryophyllales
- Family: Amaranthaceae
- Genus: Chenopodium
- Species: C. oahuense

Binomial name
- Chenopodium oahuense (Meyen) Aellen

= Chenopodium oahuense =

Species of flowering plant

Chenopodium oahuense is a species of flowering plant in the amaranth family known by the common names aweoweo, alaweo, alaweo huna, aheahea, ahea, ahewahewa, and kahaihai. It is endemic to Hawaii, where it occurs on all of the larger islands except for Kahoolawe. It is also found on Lisianski Island, Laysan, the French Frigate Shoals, Necker Island, and Nīhoa.

This species is a shrub that can reach 5 to 20 meters in height. The fleshy, lightly hairy leaf blades have three lobes. The inflorescence is a panicle of small flowers.

== Uses ==
This plant can be used for Hawaiian ecosystem restoration and erosion control. Sooty terns and red-footed boobies use this plant as nesting material. The Hawaiian people use the wood of this plant to make shark hooks, and the cooked leaves are eaten like (related) spinach. The bark was traditionally used for beautifying the skin; and was consumed by nursing mothers to beautify the skin during development. In addition with other native herbs it was mixed for weight gain in children.
