= David K. Trask Jr. =

American politician

David K. Trask Jr. (–2016) was a Native Hawaiian politician who served in the state and territorial legislature. He was best known for serving as the head of the Hawaii Government Employees Association (HGEA) from 1969 to 1981.

== Biography ==
Trask was born to David K. Trask Sr. in Honolulu, Hawaii. He was the sixth of nine children. He was elected to the 28th Hawaii Territorial Legislature as part of what later became known as the Hawaii Democratic Revolution of 1954. He served several terms before becoming the executive director of the HGEA in 1969. He represented the HGEA pushing for collective bargaining reforms until 1981. Trask died in 2016.

== Family ==
Haunani-Kay Trask and Mililani Trask are his nieces.
