= Walter Ritte =

Native Hawaiian activist and educator

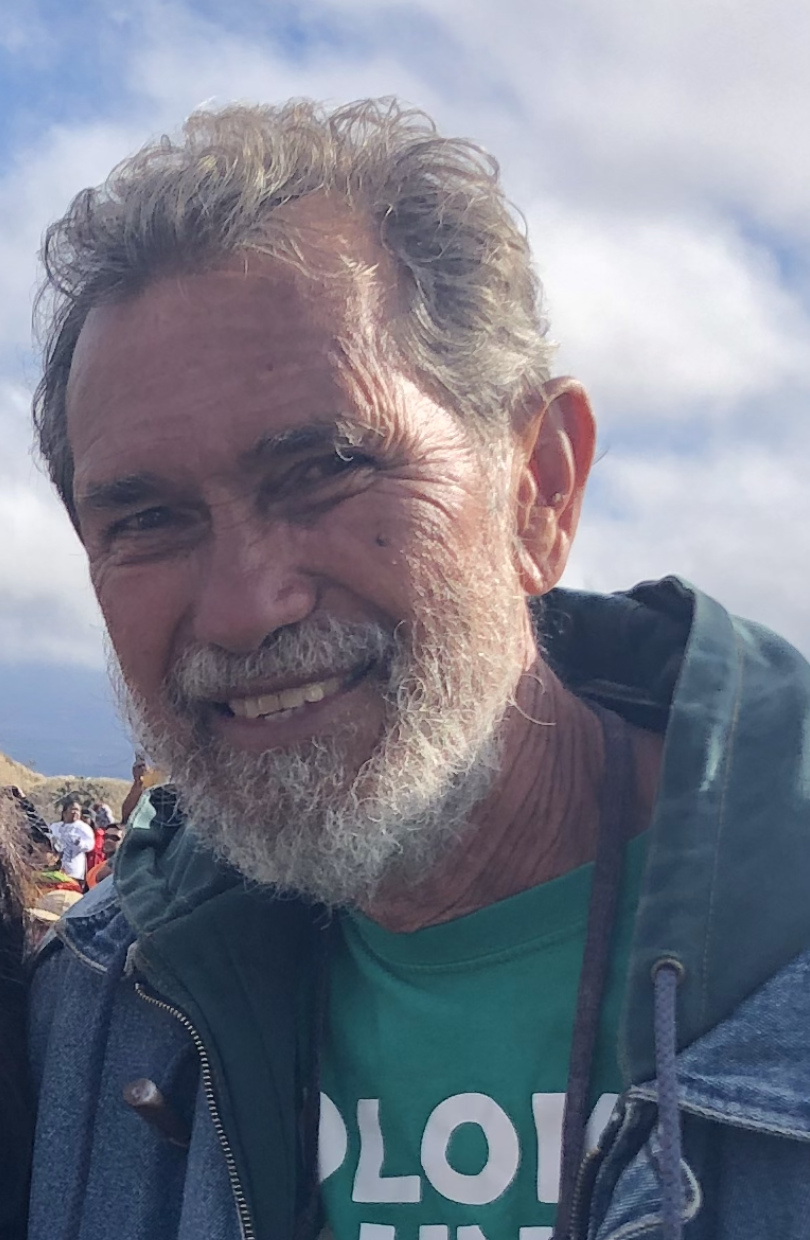
Walter Ritte

Walter Ritte Jr. (born April 12, 1945) is a Native Hawaiian activist and educator from Ho‘olehua, Moloka‘i, Hawai‘i. He began his activism as one of the "Kaho‘olawe Nine," a group of activists who were the first to land on the island of Kaho‘olawe in January 1976 in opposition to the military bombing that was then taking place on the island. Other occupations took place and Ritte, along with Richard Sawyer, occupied and stayed hidden on the island for 35 days, an act which led to his arrest and brief imprisonment. The island was eventually returned to the State of Hawai‘i. From 1980 to 1984, Ritte served as a trustee of the Office of Hawaiian Affairs.

Ritte remains an activist, focusing his opposition on overdevelopment and GMOs. He is also a Hawaiian practitioner and educator. He is married to Loretta Ritte, a fellow activist and a former Miss Hawai‘i (1966).

== Birth and early life ==
Walter was born on April 12, 1945, on the island of Maui. His father is also named Walter Ritte Jr. and his mother is Hi'iaka-i-ka-poli-o-Pele (née Purdy). Ritte attended Kamehameha Schools beginning from the 7th grade. He graduated from Kamehameha Schools (Kapalama Campus) in 1963. He attended the University of Hawaiʻi at Mānoa and then returned to Moloka‘i.

== Activism ==
The effort to regain Kaho‘olawe from the U.S. Navy began in the early 1970s with the Protect Kahoʻolawe ʻOhana, who began protesting on the island of Molokaʻi, which inspired a new political awareness and activism within the Hawaiian community. Kahu Charles Maxwell and other community leaders began to plan a coordinated effort to land on the island, which was then under Navy control. The effort for the "first landing" began in Waikapu (Maui) on January 5, 1976. Over 50 people from across the Hawaiian islands, including a range of cultural leaders, gathered on Maui with the goal of "invading" Kahoolawe on January 6, 1976. The date was selected because of its association with the United States' bicentennial anniversary.

As the larger group headed towards the island, they were intercepted by military crafts. "The Kaho‘olawe Nine" continued and successfully landed on the island. They were Walter Ritte, Emmett Aluli, George Helm, Gail Kawaipuna Prejean, Stephen K. Morse, Kimo Aluli, Aunty Ellen Miles, Ian Lind, and Karla Villalba of the Puyallup/Muckleshoot tribe (Washington State). The effort to retake Kaho‘olawe would eventually claims the lives of George Helm and Kimo Mitchell. In an effort to reach Kaho‘olawe, Helm and Mitchell (who were also accompanied by Billy Mitchell, no relation) ran into severe weather and were unable to reach the island. Despite extensive rescue and recovery efforts, they were never recovered. Ritte became a leader in the Hawaiian community, coordinating community efforts including for water rights, opposition to land development, and the protection of marine animals and ocean resources. He currently leads the effort to create state legislation requiring the labeling of GMOs in Hawai‘i.

In 2017, Ritte founded the nonprofit ‘Āina Momona with longtime collaborator Trisha Kehaulani Watson-Sproat. He serves as its executive director. The organization focuses on environmental health, social justice, food security, and Hawaiian sovereignty. The group is based at Keawanui Fishpond on Moloka‘i. The organization is unique in that it is one of the only Native Hawaiian Organizations (NHOs) in Hawai‘i lead entirely by kānaka maoli. The organization actively works to improve public history on Hawai‘i and Native Hawaiians. It has a substantial social media following and appears regularly in media due to its unique expertise and leadership in the Hawaiian community.

In July 2019, Ritte was arrested while protesting the construction of the Thirty Meter Telescope on Mauna Kea.

== See also ==
- Aloha ʻĀina
- George Helm
