= George Helm =

Native Hawaiian activist and musician (1950 – 1977)

George Helm Jr.
- Born: March 23, 1950; Hawaiʻi
- Disappeared: March 7, 1977 (aged 26)
- Known for: Hawaiian activism and music

George Jarrett Helm Jr. (March 23, 1950 – disappeared March 7, 1977) was a Native Hawaiian activist and musician from Molokaʻi, Hawaiʻi. He graduated from St. Louis High School on Oahu in 1968, where he studied under Hawaiian cultural experts John Keola Lake and Kahauanu Lake. In 1975, he joined the Hui Aloha ʻĀina organization on Molokai and helped form the Protect Kahoʻolawe ʻOhana to end the United States Navy's bombing of the island. In 1976, he participated in an occupation of Kahoʻolawe. On March 7, 1977, he disappeared while attempting to leave the island.

== Early life ==
George Jarrett Helm Jr. was born on March 23, 1950, to George Jarrett Helm Sr. and Melanie Koko Helm. He was the fifth of seven children.

== Career ==
Helm's activism began with the Molokaʻi-based group Hui Alaloa around 1975. He became involved with the Protect Kahoʻolawe ʻOhana, a Native Hawaiian-led organization that sought to end the bombing of the island of Kahoʻolawe by the U.S. Navy.

In 1976, he joined nine other activists in occupying Kahoʻolawe to protest military target practice there.

"We were touched by some force that pushed us into commitment." (George Helm, Hawaiʻi Observer, 1976)

He appealed to the Hawaii State Legislature and the U.S. Congress regarding the protection of the island. He proved to be a persuasive writer and orator for Kahoʻolawe's protection with contemporaries noting that he was a powerful speaker.However, the bombing continued.

On January 30, 1977, Helm and four other activists (Note: Walter Ritte, Richard Sawyer, Charles Warrington, and Francis Kaʻuhane) landed on Kahoʻolawe with a plan to raise public awareness. However, their presence was met with resistance by the authorities and led to multiple arrests. Most of the group was arrested except for Ritte and Sawyer, who stayed hidden on the island for 35 days, with limited food and water.

== Disappearance ==
On March 5, 1977, Helm travelled to Kahoʻolawe alongside fisherman and park ranger Kimo Mitchell (son of activist Harry Kunihi Mitchell) and water expert Billy Mitchell (Note: The two were unrelated.) to check on fellow activists Walter Ritte and Richard Sawyer. They searched for them by boat and on surfboards.

Unbeknownst to them, Sawyer and Ritte had already been found by the military. After failing to locate Sawyer and Ritte, the three men waited to be picked up by an acquaintance, Sluggo Hahn, but he never came. Hahn's boat would later be found sunk off the Kihei pier with its bilge plugs removed.

The three men attempted to return to Maui on March 7th amidst treacherous weather conditions. (Note: There were reports of high winds, small-craft warnings, and pounding waves on the shoreline.) They had a long board, a short board, and a pair of fins between them. On the entry to the water, Helm sustained a gash to his head. Once they were in the water, it was obvious that the currents and ocean conditions would prevent them from reaching Maui. At this point, Billy Mitchell took the long board and headed back to Kahoʻolawe to get help.

Facing severe currents, Billy Mitchell returned to the island for assistance while Helm and Kimo Mitchell continued toward Maui.It took Billy Mitchell a good part of the day to reach the shore and walk across the island to notify the Navy of the situation and involve the Coast Guard in a rescue operation. Billy Mitchell was the only survivor of the group. He last saw Helm and Kimo Mitchell near the islet of Molokini.

== Legacy ==
Helm's activism, speaking, and writing, have come to be seen as playing a central role in shaping the Hawaiian sovereignty and Aloha ʻĀina movement.

The song "Hawaiian Soul" by Jon Osorio and Randy Borden was composed in his honor.

The song Mele O Kahoolawe was written to honor his legacy.

In 2020, filmmaker ‘Āina Paikai released a 19-minute film titled, Hawaiian Soul, about Helm's life.

== Personal life ==
Helm was a falsetto vocalist and was known for playing complex guitar arrangements. Although his only musical recordings were made with minimal technology in a local bar, they are played regularly on Hawaiian music stations. The popular song, "Hawaiian Soul," by Jon Osorio and Randy Borden, was written in his memory.

== See also ==
- List of people who disappeared mysteriously at sea
