= Molokini =

Islet in Maui County, Hawaii

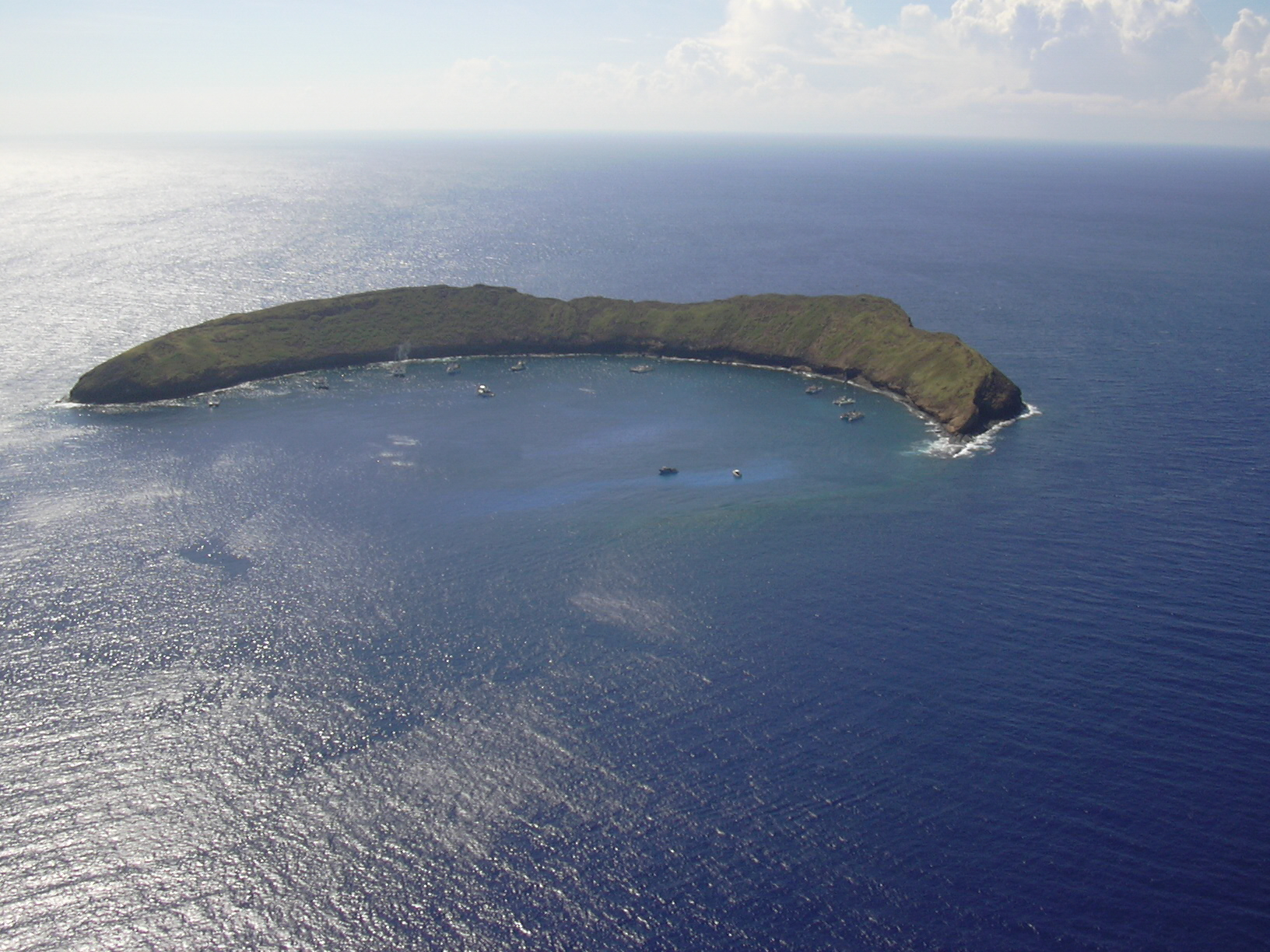
- Molokini seen from the north

Geography
- Location: 20°38′00″N 156°29′46″W
- Area: 23 acres (9.3 ha)
- Highest elevation: 161 ft (49.1 m)

Administration
- Hawaiʻi, United States

Demographics
- Population: 0

Molokini is a crescent-shaped, partially submerged volcanic crater which forms a small, uninhabited islet located in ʻAlalākeiki Channel between the islands of Maui and Kahoʻolawe, within Maui County in Hawaii. It is the remains of one of the seven Pleistocene epoch volcanoes that formed the prehistoric Maui Nui island, during the Quaternary Period of the Cenozoic Era.

The islet has an area of 23 acres (9.3 ha), a diameter of about 0.4 miles (0.6 km), is 161 feet (50 m) at its highest point, and is located about 2.5 miles (2.2 nmi; 4.0 km) west of Makena State Park and south of Maʻalaea Bay. The islet is a Hawaiʻi State Seabird Sanctuary.

== Recreation ==
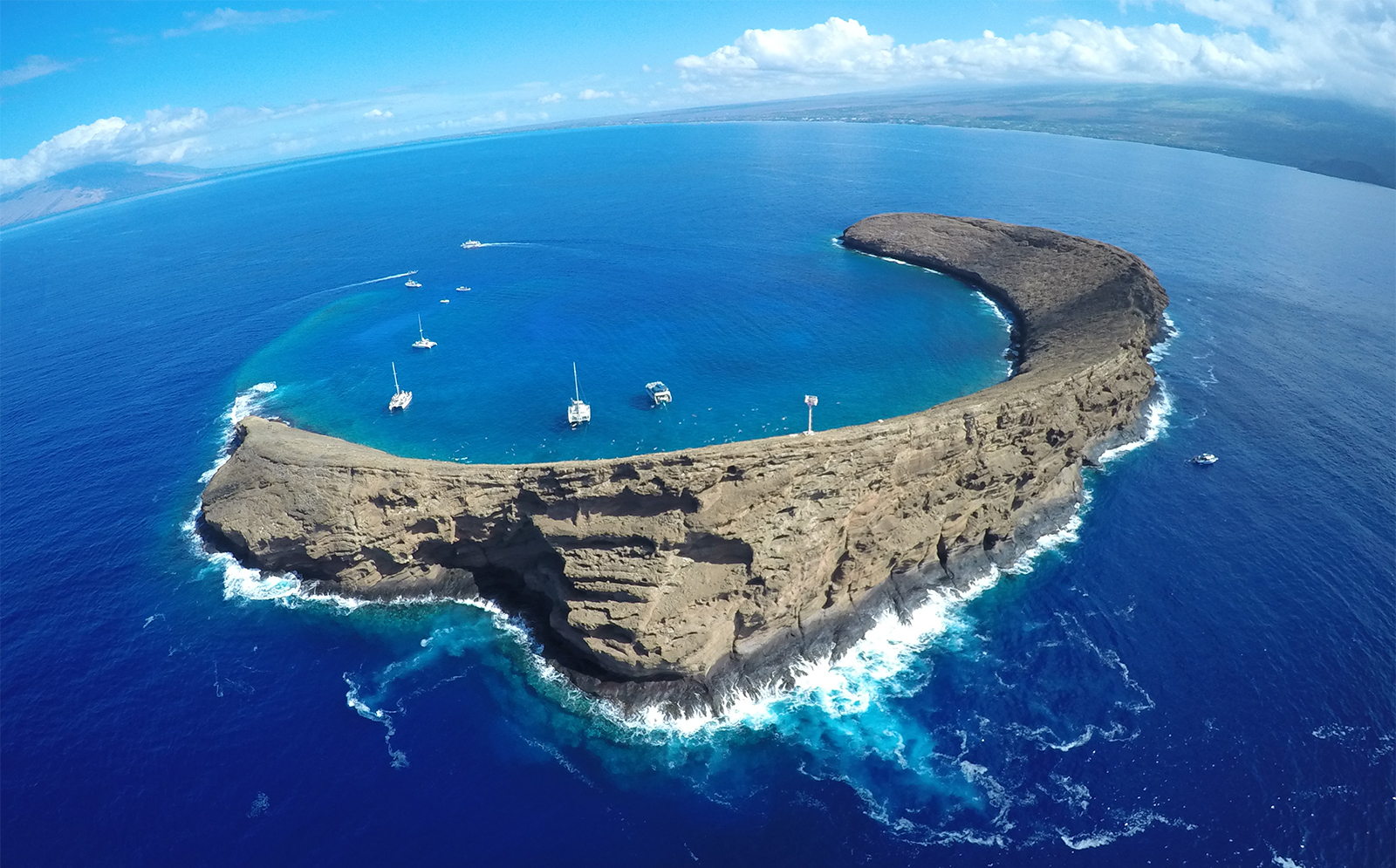
Snorkel boats inside Molokini crater

Molokini is a destination for scuba diving, snuba, and snorkeling. Its crescent shape protects divers inside it from waves and the channel's powerful currents, though diving also takes place off the 300-foot (91.5-meter) sheer outer wall. Molokini is great for snorkelers and divers, offering water clarity of up to 150 feet. With no sand beach, visitors instead find sand patches, basalt rocks, and boulders covering the bottom of the cove. In the morning, when winds are calmer, smaller tour boats also take guests to snorkel off the outer wall.

The crater houses a reef with visibility as deep as 150 feet (46 m). Molokini is home to about 250 species of fish, many endemic (see Ecology below). The best conditions occur in early morning. The water depth is 20–50 feet (6–15 m) in the majority of the allowed dive spots.

Because Molokini attracts many boats, the Hawaii State Division of Boating and Recreation established mooring buoys and "Day Use Mooring Rules" for Molokini to protect against damage from dropped anchors.

== Mythology ==
In Hawaiian legend, Molokini (translating to "many ties") was a beautiful woman. She and Pele, the fire goddess, were in love with the same man. The jealous Pele cut her rival in two and transformed her into stone. This act of vengeance is rumored to be the reason for the crescent-shaped Molokini crater. The woman's head is supposedly Puʻu Olai, the cinder cone by Makena Beach.

== History ==
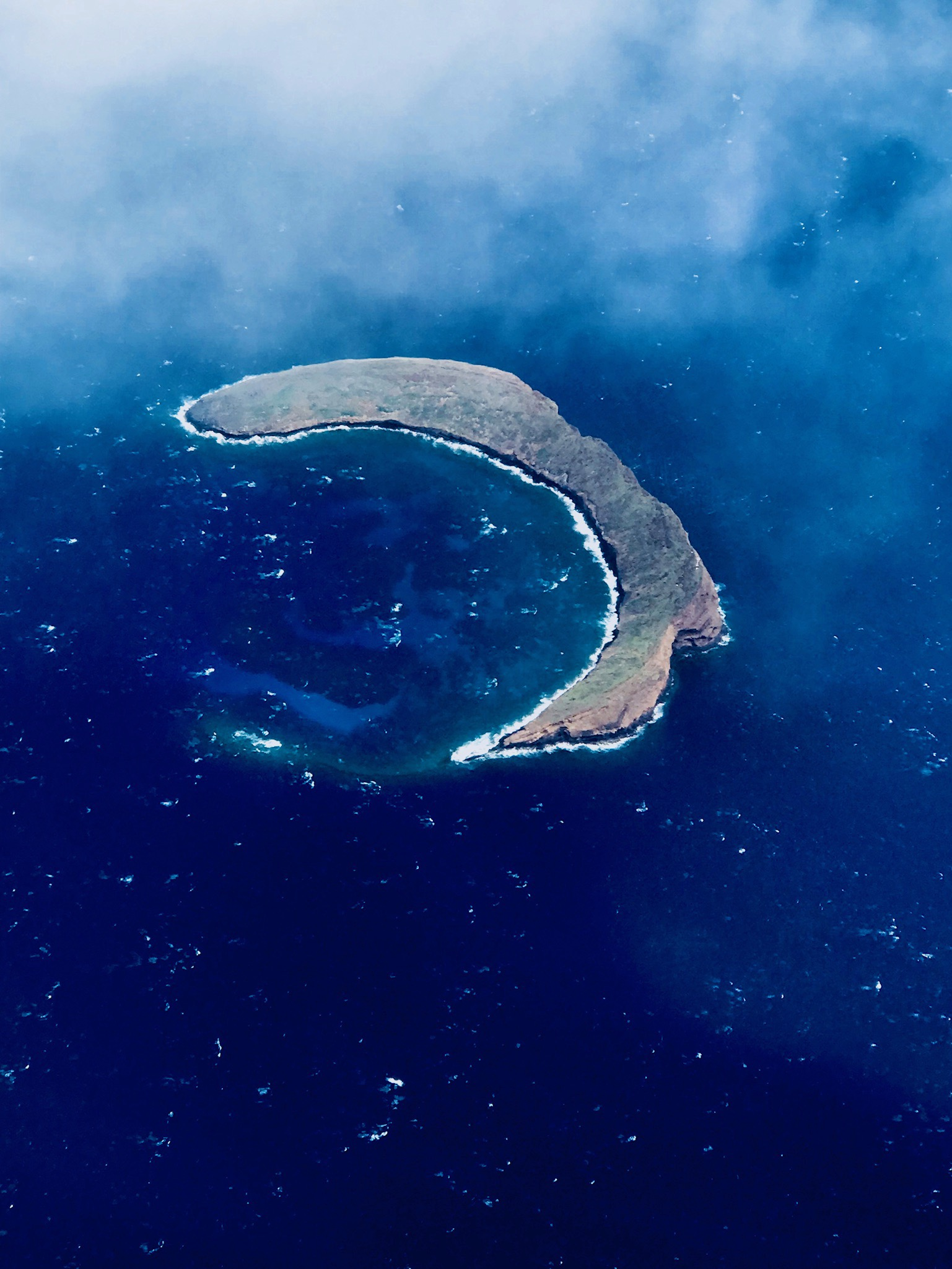
An aerial photo of the west side of Molokini

Potassium-argon dating indicates that Molokini erupted approximately 230,000 years ago. Archaeological evidence, primarily in the form of stone sinkers and lures, show that early Hawaiians visited Molokini to fish. They also likely harvested seabirds, eggs and feathers.

During World War II, the United States Navy used Molokini for target practice, as its shape is somewhat similar to a battleship. In 1975 and 1984, the Navy detonated in-place unexploded munitions found within the crater, resulting in the destruction of large areas of coral. This resulted in a public outcry. A thorough search and manual removal of unexploded munitions to deep water was carried out by volunteer divers as a result. A 2006 survey found no evidence of unexploded munitions on the islet. As a result of the extensive target practice, the southwest rim of the islet is damaged.

From the 1950s through the 1970s, commercial harvesting of black coral occurred in Molokini. In 1977 Molokini islet, the crater, and the surrounding 77 acres (31 ha) of underwater terrain were declared a Marine Life Conservation District (MLCD).

== Ecology ==
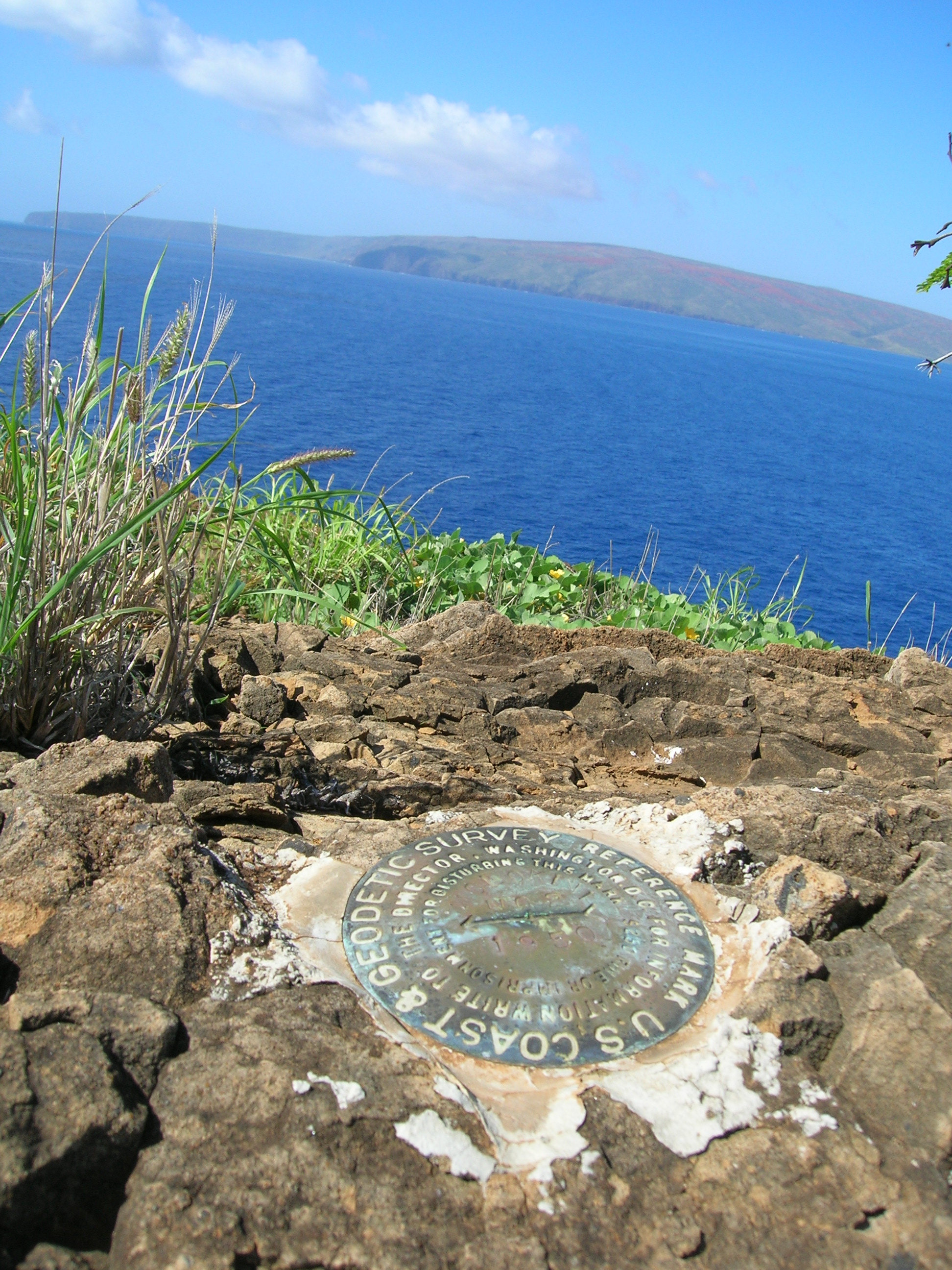
United States Coast and Geodetic Survey marker on Molokini.

Molokini crater is home to approximately 250 to 260 marine species. Most commonly observed among these are the black triggerfish, yellow tang, Moorish idol, parrotfish, raccoon butterflyfish and bluefin trevally. Humpback whales can also be found in the Molokini cove during the winter time. Due to constant exposure to park visitors and the long history as a conservation district, the fish of Molokini are comfortable with the presence of nearby divers. Small whitetip reef sharks and moray eels are occasionally seen in the crater, and red pencil urchins can be seen quite frequently.

The waters of Molokini contain 38 hard coral species and approximately 100 species of algae. Although quite dense on the seafloor, they are not as densely packed as they had historically been due to the constant tourism and activity there. The islet is home to at least two species of nesting seabirds — Bulwer's petrels and wedge-tailed shearwaters. Additionally, great frigatebirds have been observed on Molokini islet.

== Restrictions on access and activities ==
Molokini islet is federally owned and is a state seabird sanctuary. Thus, unauthorized landing is prohibited. Permission to land must be obtained both from the U.S. Coast Guard and the Hawaii Division of Forestry and Wildlife.

Regulations covering the Molokini Shoal MLCD (see History above) prohibit fishing, collection or removal of specimens, and fish feeding within its bounds. Additionally, dropping anchor within the MLCD is not permitted due to the potential of damage to the coral reef. Tour boat operators have been allocated fixed mooring points instead.

Snorkeling and scuba diving are by far the most popular activities at the crater. Visibility at Molokini regularly exceeds 50 feet (15 meters), and the inside of the crater is generally sheltered from strong winds and waves. The back wall of the island has been named one of the top 100 diving destinations in the world by scubadiving.com. This drift dive offers steep drop-offs 360 feet (110 meters) to the ocean floor's reef and underwater life.

=== Moorings ===
Molokini Crater requires permits for commercial vessels to moor within the crater. A study showed that over 300,000 visitors visited Molokini crater annually. This number of visitors is thought to have affected marine life inside the crater. A proposed bill in 2019, if put into effect, will decrease the number of moorings in the crater from over 20 to 12 total moorings. This will limit the number of visitors to the crater and help to preserve marine wildlife.

== Gallery ==
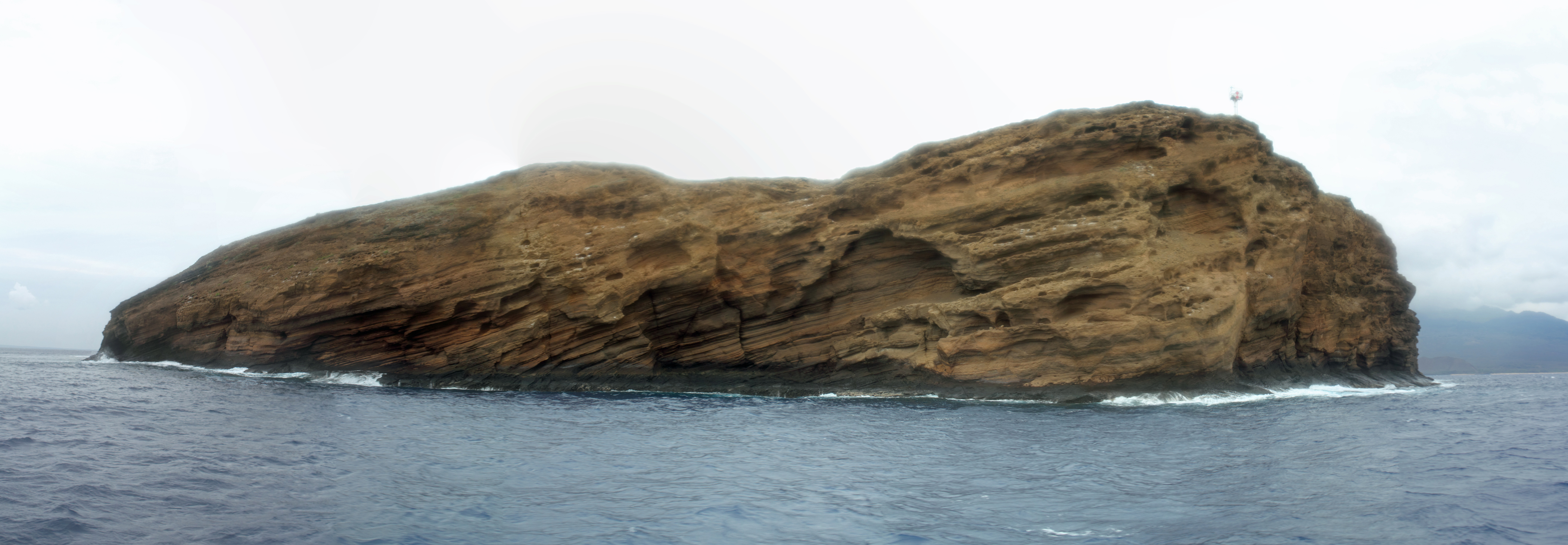
South (or "back") side of Molokini

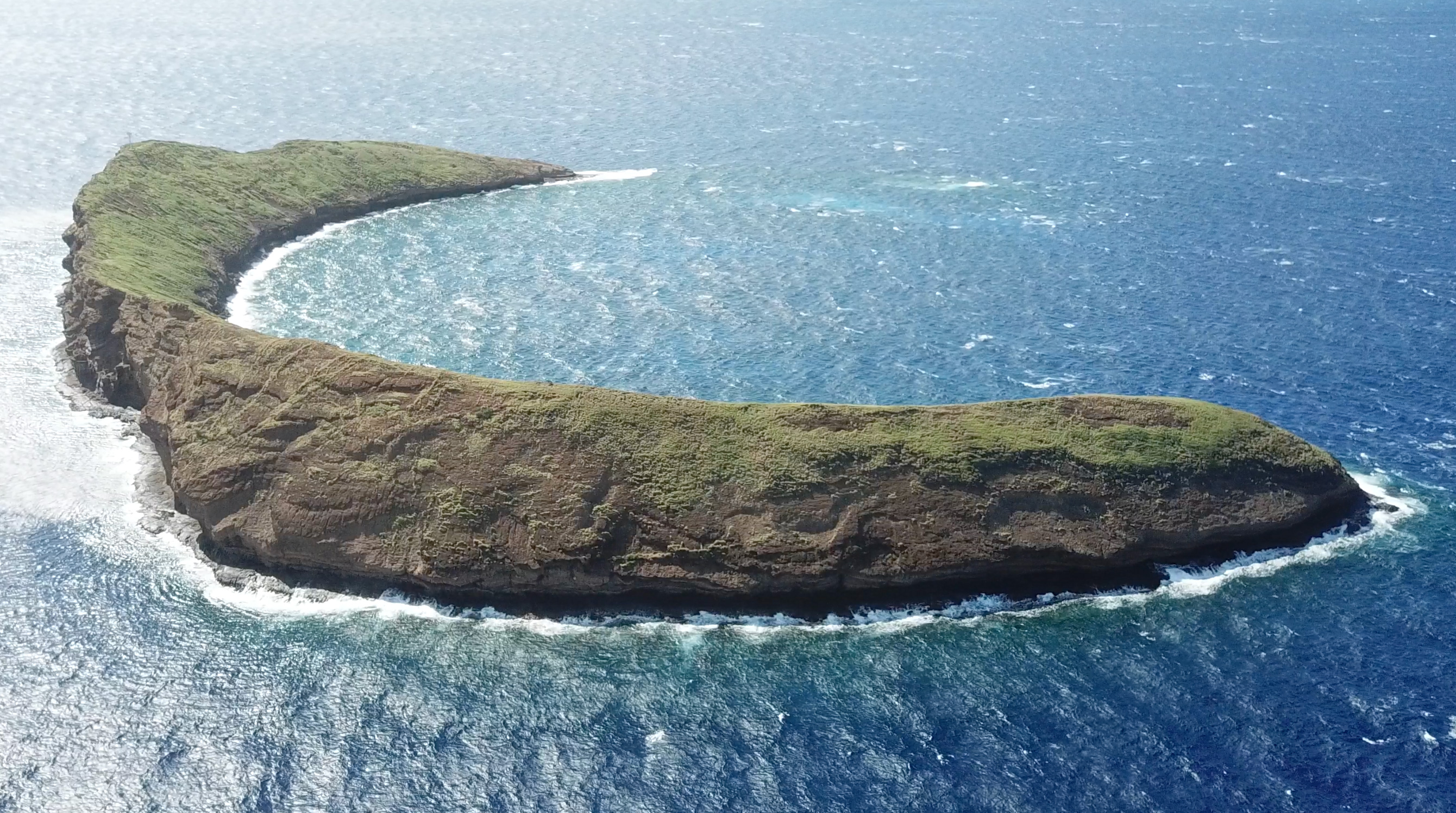
East side of crater

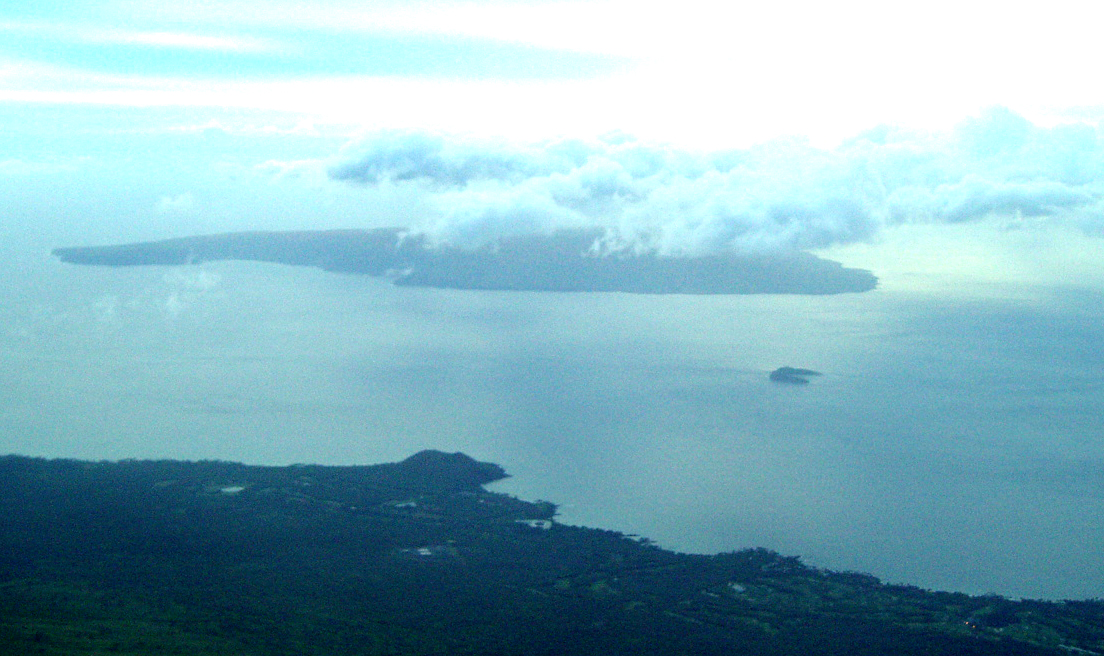
Aerial view of Kahoʻolawe (in the distance), Molokini, and the Makena side of Maui

== See also ==
- Desert island
- List of islands
