= Nadao Yoshinaga =

American politician

- Born: August 8, 1919; Wailuku, Maui
- Died: December 29, 2009 (aged 90)
- Education: Maui High School University of Hawaii at Manoa DePaul University
- Occupations: senator, attorney
- Years active: senator from 1955 to 1974

Nadao "Najo" Yoshinaga (Japanese: 吉永 洋雄, August 8, 1919 – December 29, 2009) was a senator from Hawaii and a member of the 442nd Regimental Combat Team.

== Early life ==
Yoshinaga was born in Wailuku, Maui on August 8, 1919. He graduated from Maui High School. He studied at the University of Hawaii at Manoa, then joined the 442nd on February 23, 1942. After serving in the military, he studied law at DePaul University and became an attorney.

== Career ==
Yoshinaga was elected to the Territorial House of Representatives during Hawaii's Democratic revolution. He then served as a senator from 1955 to 1974. During his tenure, he was especially interested in passing legislation related to labor and healthcare, such as the 1974 Prepaid Health Care Act. Yoshinaga was instrumental in getting the latter passed because he pushed for studies of universal healthcare during the late 1960s.

Yoshinaga also had a controversial position on population control: not only was he for legalizing abortion, but he also introduced a bill that would require every woman with more than two children to be sterilized. He started the Commission on Population Stabilization in the 1970s. During protests against Kalama valley's redevelopment, he proposed a bill in which the Senate would buy the land and allow the residents to stay there while researchers studied population growth in the area.

Yoshinaga helped to establish the State Foundation on Culture and the Arts. He also supported the ILWU.

After retiring in 1974, he was a mentor to Democratic politicians. Even until his death on December 29, 2009, Yoshinaga visited the State Capitol once a week and closely followed President Obama's national healthcare plan.
