= Haunani-Kay Trask =

Native Hawaiian scholar and activist (1949–2021)

- Haunani-Kay Trask in an interview
- Born: October 3, 1949; San Francisco, California, U.S.
- Died: July 3, 2021 (aged 71); Honolulu, Hawaii, U.S.
- Education: University of Wisconsin–Madison (BA, MA, PhD)
- Occupations: Activist, educator, author, poet
- Movement: Hawaiian sovereignty
- Partner: David Stannard
- Relatives: Mililani B. Trask (sister); David K. Trask Jr. (uncle)

Haunani-Kay Trask (October 3, 1949 – July 3, 2021) was a Native Hawaiian activist, educator, author, poet, and a leader of the Hawaiian sovereignty movement. Trask was professor emerita at the University of Hawaiʻi at Mānoa, where she founded and directed the Kamakakūokalani Center for Hawaiian Studies.

== Early life and education ==
Trask was born to Haunani and Bernard Trask. She was born in San Francisco, California and grew up on the Koʻolau side of the island of Oahu in Hawaii. Trask descended from the Kahakumakaliua line of Kauaʻi through her father, who was a lawyer, and the Piʻilani line of Maui through her mother, who was an elementary school teacher.

Trask came from a politically active family. One of her two sisters, Mililani, is a Hawaiian language immersion teacher, attorney, and a fellow leader of the Hawaiian sovereignty movement. Trask's paternal grandfather, David Trask Sr., was chairman of the civil service commission and the police commission in 1922, served as the sheriff of Honolulu from 1923 to 1926, and was elected a territorial senator from Oʻahu in 1932. He was a key proponent of Hawaiʻi statehood. Trask's uncle, attorney Arthur K. Trask was a Democratic member of the Statehood Commission from 1944 to 1957. Another uncle, David Trask Jr., was the head of the Hawaiʻi Government Employees Association.

Trask graduated from Kamehameha Schools in 1967. She attended the University of Chicago, but transferred to the University of Wisconsin–Madison to complete her bachelor's degree in 1972, master's degree in 1975, and Ph.D. in political science in 1981. Her dissertation was published into a book, Eros and Power: The Promise of Feminist Theory, by the University of Pennsylvania Press in 1986.

== Career ==
Trask founded the Kamakakūokalani Center for Hawaiian Studies at the University of Hawaiʻi at Mānoa. The center emerged as an evolution of the university’s American Studies program after Trask “charged the department with sex and race discrimination.” Trask protested the American Studies curriculum’s lack of racial, ideological, and gender diversity. She served as the center's director for almost ten years and was one of its first tenured faculty members. Trask helped secure the building of the Gladys Brandt Kamakakūokalani Center for Hawaiian Studies, the permanent center for Hawaiian Studies at the University of Hawaiʻi at Mānoa. In 2010, Trask retired from her director position but continued teaching native political movements in Hawaiʻi and the Pacific, the literature and politics of Pacific Islander women, Hawaiian history and politics, and third world and indigenous history and politics as an emeritus faculty member.

Trask hosted and produced First Friday, a monthly public-access television program started in 1986 to highlight political and cultural Hawaiian issues. Trask co-wrote and co-produced the award-winning 1993 documentary Act of War: The Overthrow of the Hawaiian Nation. She also wrote the 1993 book From a Native Daughter: Colonialism and Sovereignty in Hawaiʻi, which has been described by Cynthia G. Franklin and Laura E. Lyons as a "foundational text" about indigenous rights. Trask published two books of poetry, the 1994 Light in the Crevice Never Seen and the 2002 Night Is a Sharkskin Drum. Trask developed We Are Not Happy Natives, a CD published in 2002 about the Hawaiian sovereignty movement.

Trask was a fellow at the International Institute of Human Rights in 1984, a research fellow at the American Council of Learned Societies in 1984, a Rockefeller fellow at the University of Colorado from 1993-1994, a "National Endowment for the Arts writer-in-residence" at the Institute of American Indian Arts in 1996, a fellow at the Pacific-Basin Research Center at Harvard University from 1998-1999, and a William Evans visiting fellow in Maori studies at the University of Otago.

Trask represented Native Hawaiians at the United Nations Working Group on Indigenous Peoples in Geneva. In 2001, she traveled to South Africa to participate in the United Nations World Conference against Racism, Racial Discrimination, Xenophobia, and Related Intolerance.

=== Awards and recognitions ===
In 1991, Trask was named “Islander of the Year” by Honolulu Magazine and one of ten Pacific women of the year by Pacific Islands Monthly Magazine. In 1994, she was awarded the Gustavus Myers Award for her 1993 book From a Native Daughter. In March 2017, Hawaiʻi Magazine recognized Trask as one of the most influential women in Hawaiian history. In 2019, Trask was awarded the “Angela Y. Davis Prize” from the American Studies Association in recognition of her application of her “scholarship for the public good.”

Trask was also elected to the American Academy of Arts and Sciences in 2021, and was set to be inducted in Spring of 2022 before her passing. She was posthumously honored by the academy in 2022.

== Political beliefs ==
While earning her undergraduate degree in Chicago, Trask learned about and became an active supporter of the Black Panther Party. During her graduate study on politics, Trask began to engage in feminist studies and considered herself to be a feminist. Later in her career, Trask denounced her identification as a "feminist" because of its mainstream focus on Americans, whiteness, and "First World 'rights' talk." She later claimed to align more with transnational feminism.

Trask opposed the presence of the United States Armed Forces and tourism in Hawaii. She also opposed Asian immigration to Hawaii, believing that Japanese Americans in particular were guilty of settler colonialism, despite their own historic oppression on sugar plantations.

Personifying Hawaiʻi as a woman was part of Trask's claim that militarization of the islands relies on sexist imagery. In 2004, Trask spoke out against the Akaka Bill, a bill to establish a process for Native Hawaiians to gain federal recognition similar to the recognition that some Native American tribes possess. She said that the bill was drafted ex parte and that hearings were withheld to exclude native community involvement. As a leader of the Aloha ʻĀina movement she advocated for Hawaiian sovereignty at the United Nations and at other forums for the return of the islands to Native Hawaiians.

== Personal life ==
Trask's longtime partner was University of Hawaiʻi professor David Stannard.

Trask died from cancer on July 3, 2021. In September 2021, the Department of Philosophy at the University of Hawaiʻi at Mānoa issued a posthumous apology to Trask for attacks she received from the university's philosophers in the past. In her obituary, The New York Times cited her quote, “We will die as Hawaiians. We will never be Americans.”

== Selected works ==
=== Books ===
- Fighting the Battle of Double Colonization: The View of a Hawaiian Feminist (1984)
- Eros and Power: The Promise of Feminist Theory (1986)
- Politics and Public Policy in Hawaiʻi (Contributor, 1992)
- From a Native Daughter: Colonialism and Sovereignty in Hawaiʻi (1993)
- Light in the Crevice Never Seen (1994)
- Feminist Nationalism (Contributor, 1997)
- Intimate Nature: The Bond Between Women and Animals (Contributor, 1998)
- Inside Out: Literature, Cultural Politics, and Identity in the New Pacific (Contributor, 1999)
- Literary Studies East and West, volume 17 (Contributor, 2000)
- Night Is a Sharkskin Drum (2002)
- Kue: Thirty Years Of Land Struggles in Hawaiʻi (2004)

=== Articles ===
- Settlers of Color and “Immigrant” Hegemony: “Locals” in Hawaiʻi, Amerasia Journal 26:2 (2000)
- Featured in Rampike Arts & Literary Magazine, Stanford Law Review, Japan-Asia Quarterly Review, Signs: Journal of Women in Culture and Society, Hawaiian Journal of History, Critical Perspectives of Third World America, Ethnies: Review of Survival International, Contemporary Pacific, Pacific Islands Communication Journal, Pacific Studies.

=== Visual media ===
- Act of War: The Overthrow of the Hawaiian Nation (documentary film, scriptwriter and co-producer, 1993)
- Haunani-Kay Trask: We Are Not Happy Natives (educational CD, 2002)
