= Cynthia G. Franklin =

American iterary and cultural critic

Cynthia G. Franklin is a contemporary American literary and cultural critic. She is a professor in the English department at the University of Hawaiʻi at Mānoa.

== Education and career ==
Franklin earned a Bachelor of Arts from Stanford University and an MA and PhD from the University of California, Berkeley.

Franklin teaches at the University of Hawaiʻi at Mānoa.

Through her work, Franklin discusses life-writing, such as academic memoirs, which explores the inner workings of academia in the context of social issues. As co-editor of the journal Biography, she shapes the discussion of life-writing as a political and global genre.

Franklin's work, Academic Lives: Memoir, Cultural Theory and the University Today (University of Georgia Press, 2009), critiques strands of contemporary cultural theory, including feminist, post-colonial, disability studies, and critical race studies as well as scrutinizing memoirs written by fellow critics as Edward Said and Jane Tompkins. Franklin's previous book Writing Women's Communities: The Politics and Poetics of Contemporary Multi-Genre Anthologies (University of Wisconsin Press, 1997) focuses on the work of feminist writers of the 70's and 80's in pioneering the anthology as a unique form of narrating women's lives.

== Publications ==
- Re-Placing America Conversations and Contestations: Selected Essays - Literary Studies - East and West (Contributor) (1993)
- Writing Women's Communities: The Politics and Poetics of Contemporary Multi-Genre Anthologies (University of Wisconsin Press (1997)
- Navigating Islands and Continents Conversations and Contestations in and Around the Pacific: Selected Essays (Contributor) (2000)
- Re-Placing America: Conversations and Contestations (Literary Studies) (Editor) (2000)
- Academic Lives: Memoir, Cultural Theory and the University Today (University of Georgia Press (2009)
- Diary of a Radical Cancer Warrior: Fighting Cancer and Capitalism at the Cellular Level (Introduction) (2011)
- Narrating Humanity: Life Writing and Movement Politics from Palestine to Mauna Kea (2023)
