= Save Our Surf =

Save Our Surf (SOS) was an American community environmental organization in Hawaii that protested off-shore development, the destruction of local surfing spots and the suburbanization of Oʻahu's coastlines.

The founder and principal spokesman for the group was John M. Kelly, Jr. As described by Kelly in 1971, the SOS strategy was based on three simple concepts: respect the intelligence of the people, get the facts to them and help the people develop an action program.

Using old fashioned political techniques – hand-bills, demonstrations and colorful presentations at public meetings – SOS quickly developed strong grassroots support in the community at large and expanded to mobilize forces from the community for confrontations with the establishment in the era of "people power".

== History ==
Save Our Surf was started in late 1964 by Kelly as a protest organization. The goal of SOS, Kelly said then, was to advocate for surfers by preserving surfing sites, promoting surfer safety and creating a positive image of the sport.

Kelly describes the social and cultural context through which SOS emerged:

"Hawaiʻi was in the post-statehood grip of rapid change when "Save Our Surf" (SOS) struggles began in the early 1960s. Freeways were beginning to rip up old communities. Waikīkī was turning into a concrete jungle. Familiar landmarks were disappearing. Surfing friends were being drafted for a far-off war and coming home bitter, if alive. Hawaiʻi's shoreline – the habitat of many people – was under assault. Surfing sites, fish and fishing areas, old beach trails, parking areas and public access were disappearing. Once clean shoreline waters near town wereturning dirty brown or green, and beginning to smell. Pollution almost suddenly appeared everywhere – on roads, sidewalks, beaches, in city air and in the news."

The movement grew overnight in 1969 when plans were unveiled by the Army Corps of Engineers and the state of Hawaii to "broaden" the beaches of Waikiki.

The organization was instrumental in preventing offshore development around the Islands and saving 140 surfing sites between Pearl Harbor and Koko Head.

John M. Kelly, Jr. died on October 3, 2007. Some of the work of SOS is continued by the Surfrider Foundation, for instance the Save Ma'alaea campaign.
