= Waiāhole-Waikāne struggle =

Anti-eviction movement in Hawaii during the 1970s

The Waiāhole-Waikāne Struggle was an influential anti-eviction movement in the U.S. state of Hawaii during the 1970s.

== Background ==
After the overthrow of the Hawaiian Kingdom in 1893, Lincoln Loy McCandless acquired two hundred acres of land, including the Waiāhole and Waikāne valleys. He began building the Waiāhole Ditch in 1913. When it was completed in 1917, it siphoned water from Oahu's rainy windward side to the dry leeward plains, where many sugar plantations were. This limited kalo cultivation by Native Hawaiians and farming by other ethnic groups living in the valleys. Many lived and farmed on land leased from McCandless in a system similar to sharecropping. After McCandless's death, ownership passed to his daughter, Elizabeth Marks.

== Struggle ==
After Hawaii became a state in 1959, Marks decided to partner with developer Joe Pao to develop the valleys as suburbs. After the Land Use Commission denied their request for the valleys to be redesignated from the State Agricultural District to the State Urban District in 1974, Marks and Pao chose to continue with development without the correct land use designation. They evicted nine families to make space for new construction and raised rents on many other families living and farming in the valley. The Waiāhole-Waikāne Community Association (WWCA) then got a lawyer to collectively negotiate everyone's leases.

The WWCA also protested while fighting the rent increases and evictions in the courts. A notable protest was in front of Marks' house in Nuuanu on April 21, 1976. However, the most well-known anti-eviction protest was on January 4, 1977, when residents of the valley blocked the road past the valley. After the protest, the Hawaii Housing Authority bought 600 acres of land from Marks and leased them to the farmers living in the valley. The struggle for the land and its usage continued in the courts as kalo farmers in the valley sued for rights to the water that was being diverted away by the Waiāhole Ditch, culminating in 2000 when the Hawaii Supreme Court ruled that the water should remain in the valley.

== See also ==
- Native Hawaiian activism
