= Kahoʻolawe =

Island in Maui County, Hawaii

Kaho‘olawe
Nickname: The Target Isle (Note: Other nicknames include: The Island of Kanaloa, Kohemalamalama, Hineliʻi, and Kahiki Moe.)
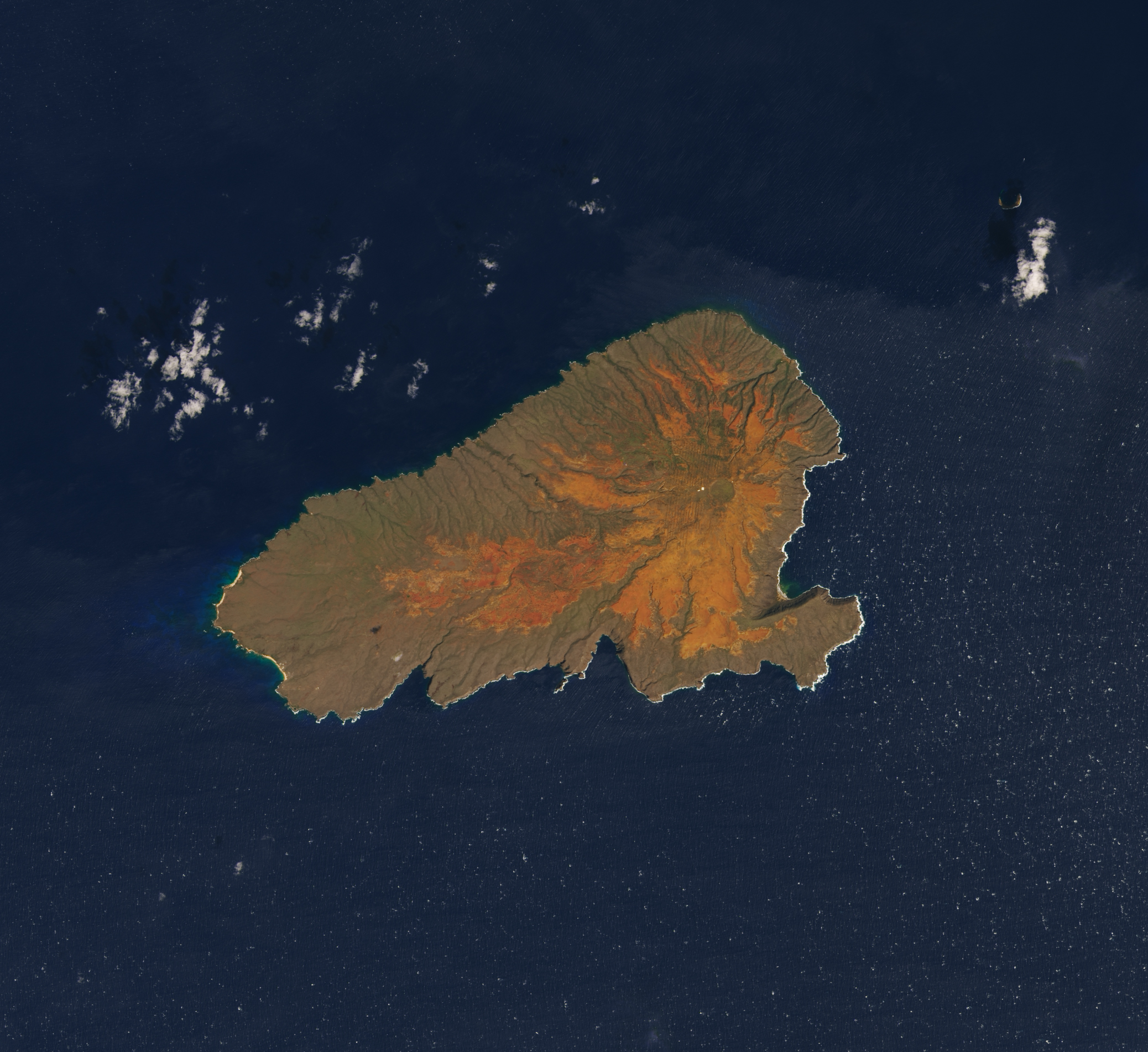
- Landsat satellite image of Kaho‘olawe

- Location in the State of Hawaii

Geography
- Location: North Pacific Ocean
- Coordinates: 20°33′N 156°36′W
- Area: 44.59 sq mi (115.5 km^{2})
- Area rank: 8th largest Hawaiian Island
- Highest elevation: 1,483 ft (452 m)
- Highest point: Puʻuomoaʻula Nui

Administration
- United States
- Symbols
- Flower: Hinahina kū kahakai (Heliotropium anomalum var. argenteum)
- Color: ʻĀhinahina (gray)

Demographics
- Population: 0 (No permanent population)
- Ethnic groups: Hawaiian

Additional information
- Time zone: Hawaii–Aleutian

Kahoʻolawe (Note: /kɑːˌhoʊ.oʊˈlɑːweɪ/ kah-HOH-oh-LAH-way; Hawaiian pronunciation: [kəˈhoʔoˈlɐve]) is the smallest of the eight main volcanic islands of the Hawaiian Islands. Unpopulated, it lies about seven miles (11 km) southwest of Maui. The island is 11 mi (18 km) long by 6.0 mi (9.7 km) wide, with a total land area of 44.97 sq mi (116.47 km^{2}). Its highest point is the crater of Luamakika, at the summit of Puʻuomoaʻula Nui, about 1,477 feet (450 m) above sea level.

Kahoʻolawe is relatively dry, with an average annual rainfall of less than 26 in (66 cm) resulting from a combination of being too low to generate much orographic precipitation from the northeastern trade winds and lying in the rain shadow of eastern Maui's 10,023-foot-high (3,055 m) volcano, Haleakalā. More than one quarter of Kahoʻolawe has been eroded down to saprolitic hardpan soil, largely on exposed surfaces near the summit.

Historically, Kahoʻolawe was always sparsely populated, due to its lack of fresh water. During World War II and the following decades, it was used as a training ground and bombing range by the Armed Forces of the United States. After decades of protests, the U.S. Navy ended live-fire training exercises on Kahoʻolawe in 1990, and the whole island was transferred to the jurisdiction of the state of Hawaii in 1994. The Hawaii State Legislature established the Kahoʻolawe Island Reserve to restore and to oversee the island and its surrounding waters. Today Kahoʻolawe can be used only for native Hawaiian cultural, spiritual, and subsistence purposes, fishing, environmental restoration, historic preservation, and education. It has no permanent residents.

== Geology ==
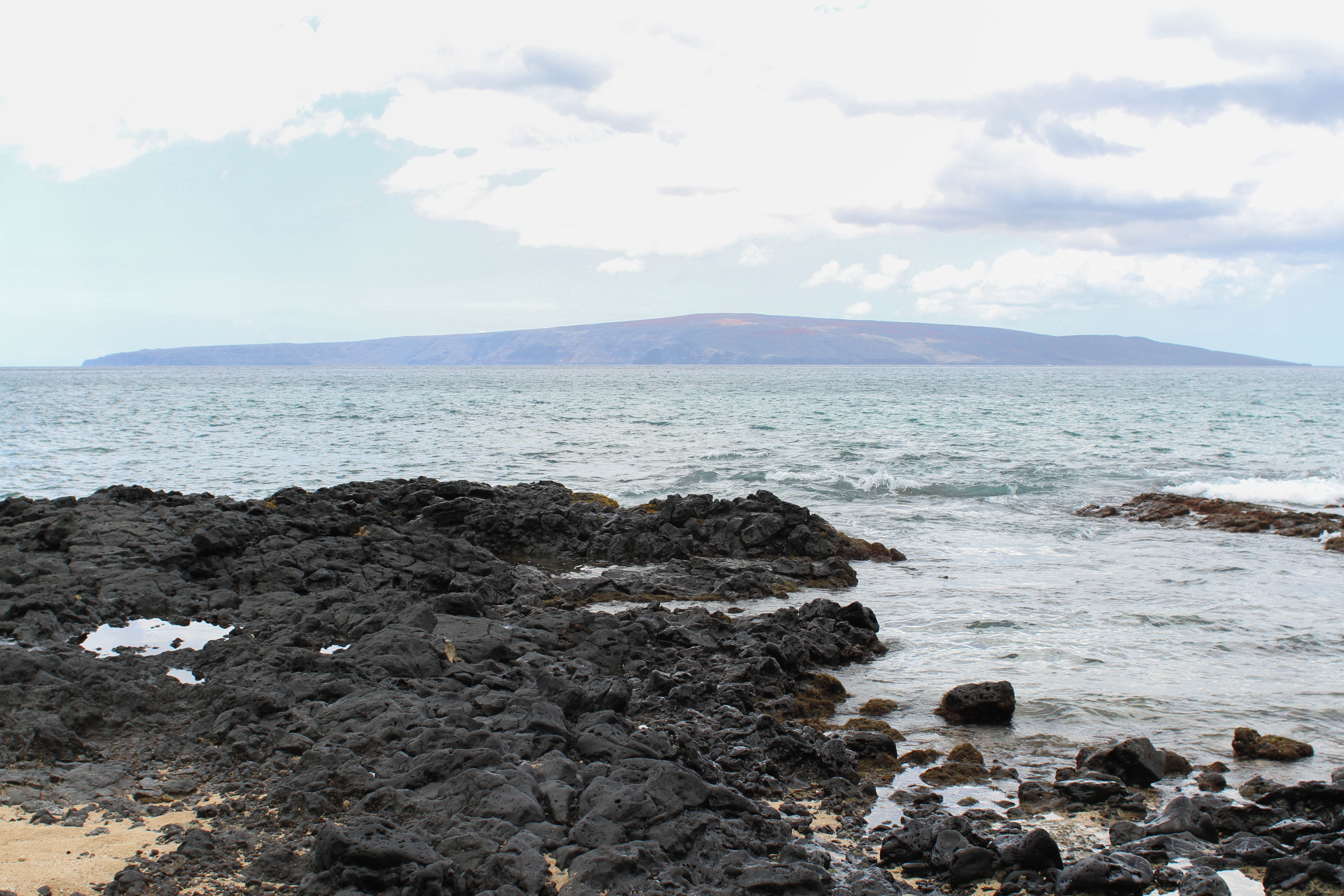
The gently sloping flanks of Kahoʻolawe shield volcano (viewed from Makena on the neighboring island Maui)

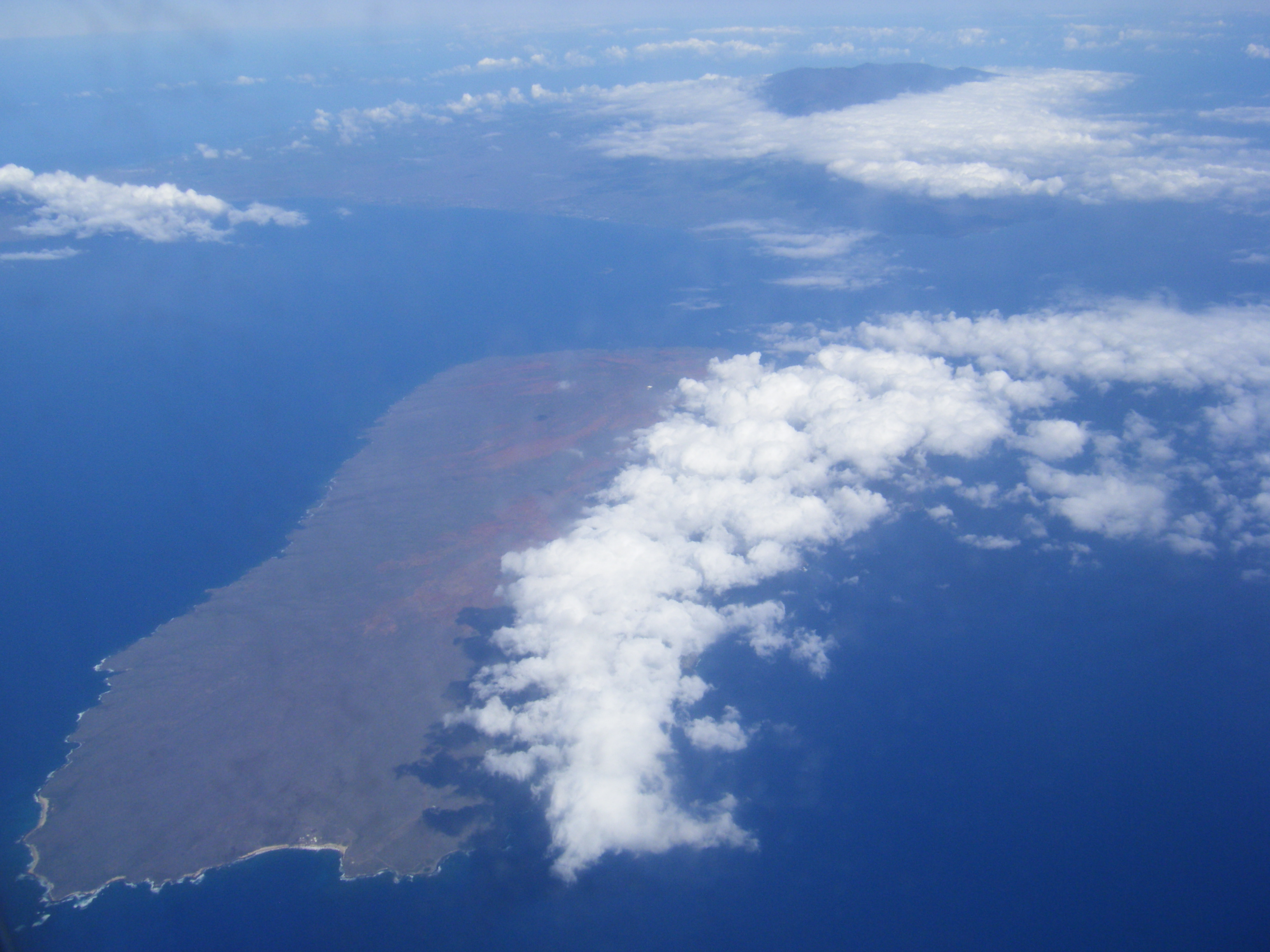
Kahoʻolawe in the foreground, Maui behind it, Mount Haleakala surrounded in clouds

Kahoʻolawe is an extinct shield volcano, which formed during the Pleistocene epoch. It was once connected to the island of Maui Nui before splitting off about 300,000 years ago. Most of the island is covered by basaltic lava flows. A caldera is located in the eastern part of the island. The last confirmed volcanic activity on the island occurred about one million years ago, though eruptions could have occurred about 10,000 years ago.

== Climate ==
Kahoʻolawe experiences a semi-arid climate (Köppen BSh).

Climate data for Kahoʻolawe
| Month | Jan | Feb | Mar | Apr | May | Jun | Jul | Aug | Sep | Oct | Nov | Dec | Year |
|---|---|---|---|---|---|---|---|---|---|---|---|---|---|
| Record high °F (°C) | 89 (32) | 92 (33) | 90 (32) | 89 (32) | 90 (32) | 91 (33) | 91 (33) | 92 (33) | 91 (33) | 93 (34) | 93 (34) | 91 (33) | 93 (34) |
| Mean maximum °F (°C) | 78.2 (25.7) | 77.9 (25.5) | 78.1 (25.6) | 77.4 (25.2) | 79.3 (26.3) | 78.5 (25.8) | 80.5 (26.9) | 80.9 (27.2) | 81.6 (27.6) | 81.4 (27.4) | 79.6 (26.4) | 78.9 (26.1) | 82.8 (28.2) |
| Mean daily maximum °F (°C) | 73.8 (23.2) | 73.6 (23.1) | 73.7 (23.2) | 74.3 (23.5) | 75.9 (24.4) | 75.9 (24.4) | 77.6 (25.3) | 77.6 (25.3) | 77.8 (25.4) | 77.5 (25.3) | 75.8 (24.3) | 74.4 (23.6) | 75.7 (24.3) |
| Mean daily minimum °F (°C) | 64.9 (18.3) | 64.8 (18.2) | 65.2 (18.4) | 65.8 (18.8) | 66.5 (19.2) | 67.5 (19.7) | 69.2 (20.7) | 69.0 (20.6) | 69.0 (20.6) | 68.7 (20.4) | 67.6 (19.8) | 66.3 (19.1) | 67.0 (19.4) |
| Mean minimum °F (°C) | 61.6 (16.4) | 59.9 (15.5) | 60.4 (15.8) | 61.8 (16.6) | 63.4 (17.4) | 65.3 (18.5) | 66.7 (19.3) | 67.0 (19.4) | 66.8 (19.3) | 66.5 (19.2) | 64.1 (17.8) | 62.7 (17.1) | 59.1 (15.1) |
| Record low °F (°C) | 59 (15) | 58 (14) | 56 (13) | 60 (16) | 60 (16) | 64 (18) | 65 (18) | 65 (18) | 64 (18) | 65 (18) | 62 (17) | 60 (16) | 56 (13) |
| Average precipitation inches (mm) | 2.44 (62) | 1.19 (30) | 1.31 (33) | 0.90 (23) | 0.94 (24) | 0.67 (17) | 1.05 (27) | 0.76 (19) | 1.09 (28) | 1.58 (40) | 1.90 (48) | 2.00 (51) | 15.82 (402) |
Source 1:
Source 2:

== History ==
=== Settlement ===
Sometime around the year 1000, Kahoʻolawe was settled by Polynesians, and small, temporary fishing communities were established along the coast. Some inland areas were cultivated. Puʻu Moiwi, a remnant cinder cone, is the location of the second-largest basalt quarry in Hawaiʻi, and this was mined for use in stone tools such as koʻi (adzes). Originally a dry forest environment with intermittent streams, the land changed to an open savanna of grassland and trees when inhabitants cleared vegetation for firewood and agriculture. Hawaiians built stone platforms for religious ceremonies, set rocks upright as shrines for successful fishing trips, and carved petroglyphs, or drawings, into the flat surfaces of rocks; these indicators of an earlier time can still be found on Kahoʻolawe. The island itself is venerated as a kinolau or body form of the sea god Kanaloa.

While it is not known how many people inhabited Kahoʻolawe, the lack of freshwater probably limited the population to a few hundred people. As many as 120 people might have once lived at Hakioawa, the largest settlement, which was located at the northeastern end of the island—facing Maui.

=== Warfare ===
Violent wars among competing aliʻi (chiefs) laid waste to the land and led to a decline in the population. During the 18th century War of Kamokuhi, Kalaniʻōpuʻu, the ruler of the Island of Hawaiʻi, raided and pillaged Kahoʻolawe in an unsuccessful attempt to take Maui from Kahekili II, the King of Maui.

=== Post-contact: Penal colony and ranching attempts ===
From 1778 to the early 19th century, observers on passing ships reported that Kahoʻolawe was uninhabited and barren, destitute of both water and wood.

After the arrival of missionaries from New England, the Kingdom of Hawaiʻi under the rule of King Kamehameha III replaced the death penalty with exile, and Kahoʻolawe became a men's penal colony sometime around 1830. Food and water were scarce, some prisoners reportedly starved, and some of them swam across the channel to Maui to find food. The law making the island a penal colony was repealed in 1853.

A survey of Kahoʻolawe in 1857 reported about 50 residents there, about 5,000 acres (2,000 ha) of land covered with shrubs, and a patch of sugarcane growth. Along the shore, tobacco, pineapple, gourds, pili grass, and scrub trees grew. Beginning in 1858, the Hawaiian government leased Kahoʻolawe to a series of ranching ventures. Some of these proved to be more successful than others, but the lack of freshwater was an unrelenting hindrance. Through the next 80 years, the landscape changed dramatically, with drought and uncontrolled overgrazing denuding much of the island. Strong trade winds blew away most of the topsoil, leaving behind red hardpan dirt.

From 1910 to 1918, the Territory of Hawaii designated Kahoʻolawe as a forest reserve in the hope of restoring the island through a revegetation and livestock removal program. This program failed, and leases again became available. In 1918, the rancher Angus MacPhee of Wyoming, later with the help of the landowner Harry Baldwin of Maui, leased the island for 21 years, intending to build a cattle ranch there. By 1932, the ranching operation was enjoying moderate success despite accidental deaths and infrastructure failures. In 1941, the attack on Pearl Harbor pushed MacPhee to sublet part of the island to the United States military. While MacPhee and Baldwin held rights to the island until 1953, the U.S. Navy retained control of the island, claiming the island was needed for military preparedness. MacPhee filed a $80,000 suit against the U.S. Navy in 1946 for reclamation of property and financial losses, but died in 1948 before it could be resolved.

=== Training grounds ===
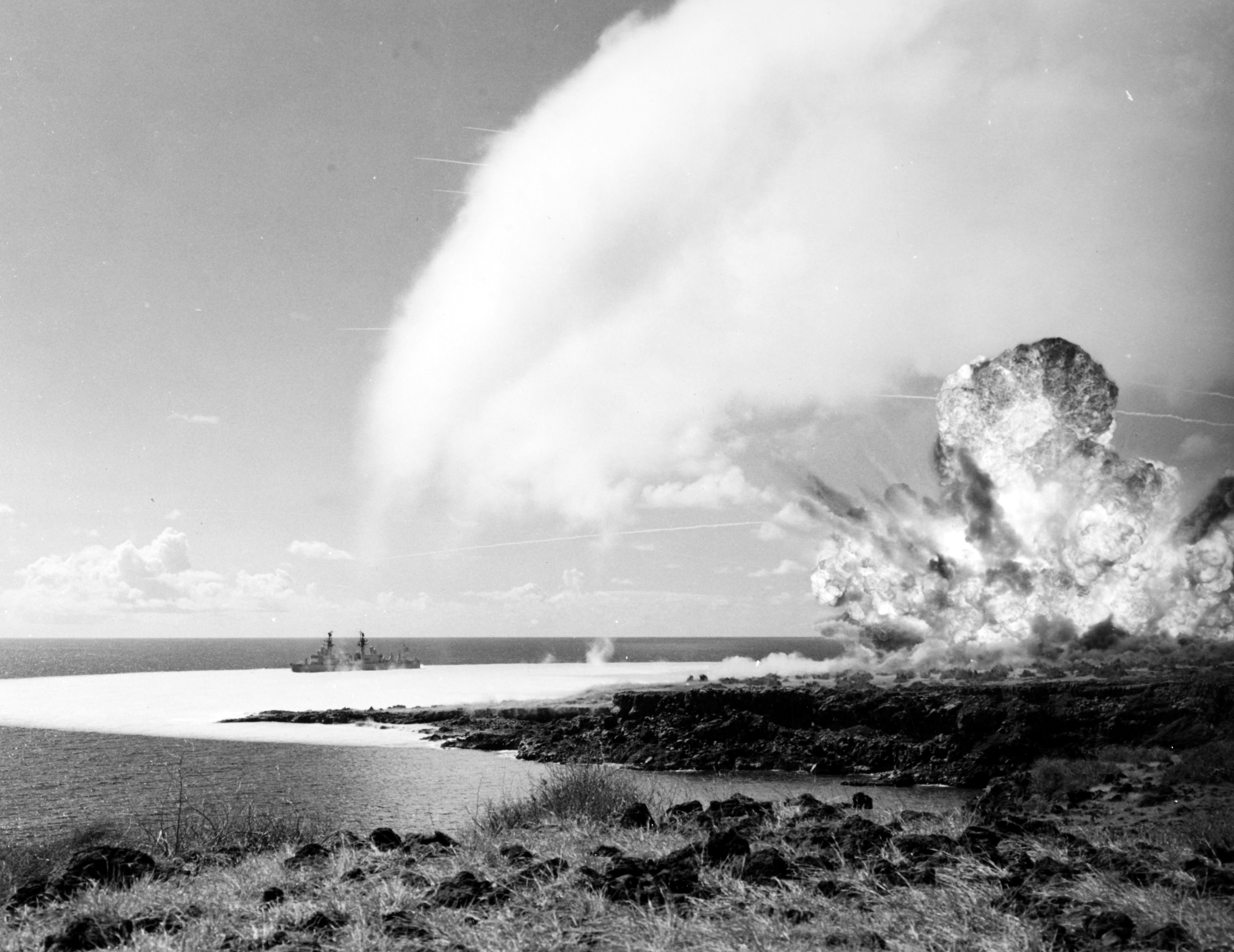
Operation "Sailor Hat", 1965, the detonation of the 500-ton TNT explosive charge for test shot "Bravo", first of a series of three test explosions on the southwestern tip of Kahoʻolawe Island, Hawaii, February 6, 1965.

On December 7, 1941, after the Imperial Japanese Navy attacked Pearl Harbor and Oahu, the U.S. Army declared martial law throughout Hawaii, and it used Kahoʻolawe as a place to train American soldiers and Marines headed west to engage in the War in the Pacific. The use of Kahoʻolawe as a bombing range was believed to be critical, since the United States was executing a new type of war in the Pacific Islands. Their success depended on accurate naval gunfire support that suppressed or destroyed enemy positions as U.S. Marines and soldiers struggled to get ashore. Thousands of soldiers, sailors, Marines, airmen, and coastguardsmen prepared on Kahoʻolawe for the brutal and costly assaults on islands such as the Gilbert and Marshall Islands, the Marianas and Pelileu, New Guinea in the Western Pacific.

Military and naval training on Kahoʻolawe continued following World War II. During the Korean War, warplanes from aircraft carriers played a critical role in attacking enemy airfields, convoys, and troop staging areas. Mock-ups of airfields, military camps, and vehicles were constructed on Kahoʻolawe, and while pilots were preparing for war at Barbers Point Naval Air Station on Oʻahu, they practiced spotting and hitting the mock-ups at Kahoʻolawe. Similar training took place throughout the Cold War and during the War in Vietnam, with mock-ups of aircraft, radar installations, gun mounts, and surface-to-air missile sites being placed across this island for pilots and bombardiers to use in their training.

In early 1965, the U.S. Navy conducted Operation Sailor Hat to determine the blast resistance of ships. Three onshore tests on the eastern shore of Kahoʻolawe near Smuggler Cove subjected the island and a target ship to massive explosions, with 500 tons of conventional TNT detonated on the island near the target ship USS Atlanta (CL-104). This warship was damaged, but she was not sunk. The blasts created a crater on the island known as "Sailor Man's Cap" and are speculated to have cracked the island's caprock, causing some groundwater to be lost into the ocean.

=== Operation Protect Kahoʻolawe ʻOhana (PKO) ===
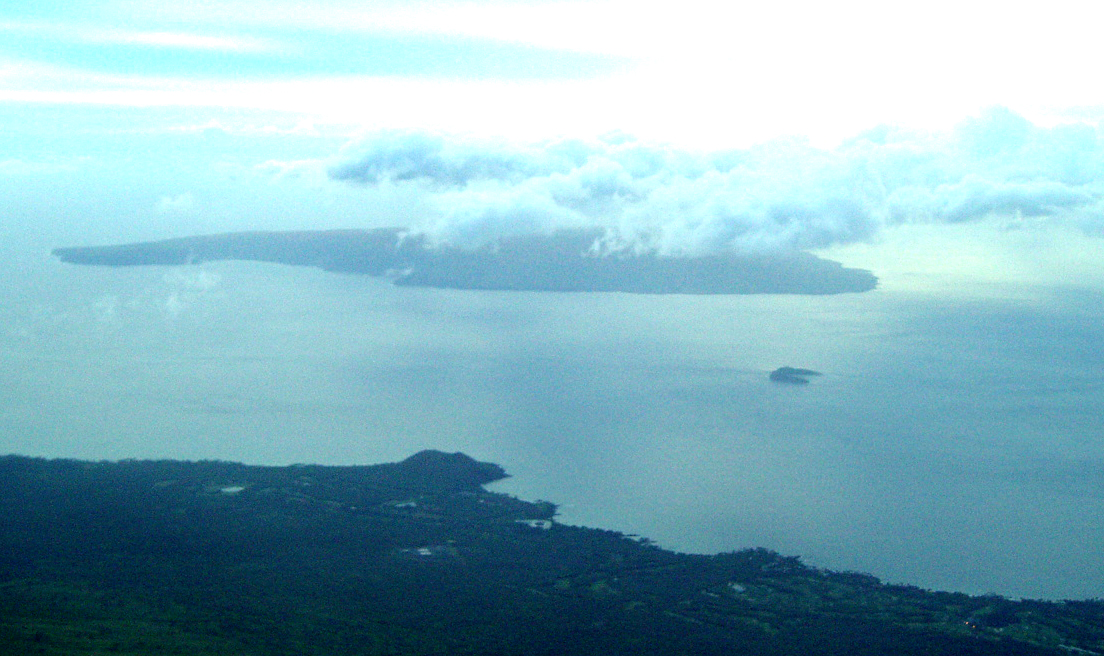
Aerial view of Kaho‘olawe, Molokini, and the Makena side of Maui, 2007

In 1976, a group called the Protect Kahoʻolawe ʻOhana (PKO) filed suit in U.S. Federal Court to stop the Navy's use of Kahoʻolawe for bombardment training, to require compliance with a number of new environmental laws and to ensure protection of cultural resources on the island. In 1977, the U.S. District Court for the District of Hawaii allowed the Navy's use of this island to continue, but the Court directed the Navy to prepare an environmental impact statement and to complete an inventory of historic sites on the island.

The effort to regain Kaho‘olawe from the U.S. Navy began as a new wave of political awareness and activism was inspired within the Hawaiian community. Charles Maxwell and other community leaders began to plan a coordinated effort to land on the island, which was still under Navy control. The effort for the "first landing" began in Waikapu, on Maui, on January 5, 1976. Over 50 people from across the Hawaiian islands, including a range of cultural leaders, gathered on Maui with the goal of "invading" Kahoʻolawe on January 6, 1976. The date was selected because of its association with the United States' Bicentennial anniversary.

As the group headed towards the island, they were intercepted by military craft. One boat, occupied by the so-called "Kahoʻolawe Nine", continued and successfully landed on the island. This group comprised Walter Ritte, Emmett Aluli, George Helm, Gail Kawaipuna Prejean, Stephen K. Morse, Kimo Aluli, Ellen Miles, Ian Lind, and Karla Villalba (of the Puyallup/Muckleshoot tribe of Washington State). On the way back to Maui, George Helm and Kimo Mitchell ran into severe weather and were unable to reach land. Despite extensive rescue and recovery efforts, they were never recovered. Ritte became a leader in the Hawaiian community, coordinating community efforts including for water rights, opposition to land development, and the protection of marine animals and ocean resources.

=== Kahoʻolawe Island Archeological District ===
- Kahoʻolawe Island Archeological District
- U.S. National Register of Historic Places
- U.S. Historic district
- Hawaiʻi Register of Historic Places
- Location within Hawaii
- NRHP reference No.: 81000205
- Added to NRHP: March 18, 1981

On March 18, 1981, the entire island of Kahoʻolawe was added to the National Register of Historic Places. At that time, the Kahoʻolawe Archaeological District was noted to contain 544 recorded archaeological or historic sites and over 2,000 individual features. As part of the soil conservation efforts, Mike Ruppe, an Army Specialist on loan from Schofield Barracks, plus other military personnel, laid lines of explosives, detonating them to break the hardpan so that seedling trees could be planted. Used car tires were taken to Kahoʻolawe and placed in miles of deep gullies to slow the washing of red soil from the barren uplands to the surrounding shores. Ordnance and scrap metal was picked up by hand and then transported by large trucks to a collection site.

It is also on the Hawaiʻi Register of Historic Places.

=== End of military use ===
In 1990, President George H. W. Bush ordered an end to live-fire training on the island. The U.S. Department of Defense Appropriations Act for Fiscal Year 1991 established the Kahoʻolawe Island Conveyance Commission to recommend terms and conditions for the conveyance of Kahoʻolawe from the U.S. government to the state of Hawaii.

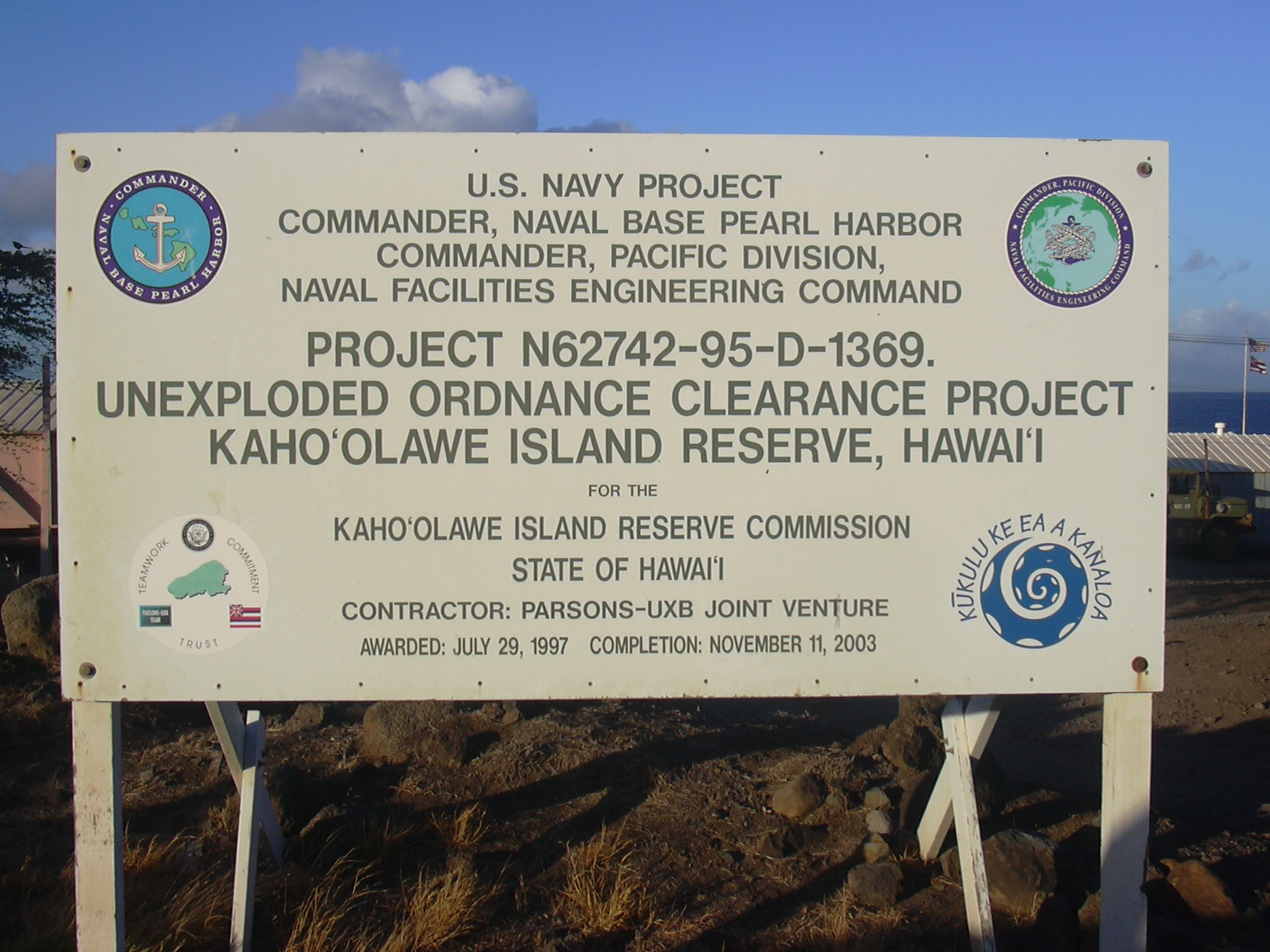
Navy sign in Honokanaia

In 1993, Senator Daniel Inouye of Hawaii sponsored Title X of the Fiscal Year 1994 for the Department of Defense appropriation bill, directing that the U.S. government convey Kahoʻolawe and its surrounding waters to the state of Hawaii. Title X also established the objective of a "clearance or removal of unexploded ordnance (UXO)" and the environmental restoration of the island, to provide "meaningful safe use of the island for appropriate cultural, historical, archaeological, and educational purposes, as determined by the State of Hawaii." In turn, the Legislature of Hawaii created the Kahoʻolawe Island Reserve Commission to exercise policy and management oversight of the Kahoʻolawe Island Reserve. As directed by Title X and in accordance with a required memorandum of understanding between the U.S. Navy and the state of Hawaii, the Navy transferred the title to the land of Kahoʻolawe to the state of Hawaii on May 9, 1994.

As required by Title X, the U.S. Navy retained access control to the island until the clearance and environmental restoration projects were completed, or until November 11, 2003, whichever came first. The state agreed to prepare a use plan for Kahoʻolawe and the Navy agreed to develop a cleanup plan based on that use plan and to implement that plan to the extent Congress provided funds for that purpose.

In July 1997, the Navy awarded a contract to the Parsons/UXB Joint Venture to clear unexploded ordnance from the island to the extent funds were provided by Congress. After the state and public review of the Navy cleanup plan, Parsons/UXB began their work on the island in November 1998.

From 1998 to 2003, the U.S. Navy executed a large-scale, but ultimately incomplete, removal of unexploded ordnance and other environmental hazards from Kahoʻolawe. Since the clearance did not completely remove all the hazardous and dangerous materials from the island, a residual level of danger remains. The Kahoʻolawe Island Reserve Commission developed a plan to manage the residual risk to reserve users and to carry out a safety program, and to establish stewardship organizations to work in conjunction with the commission.

=== Fire ===
In 2020, a wildfire burned more than 30% of the island. Firefighters abandoned suppression efforts on the first day of the fire due to fears about unexploded ordnance.

=== Current status ===
Today, the island is a part of the Kahoʻolawe Island Reserve, and its restoration is managed by the state of Hawaii in partnership with local organizations. The island’s cultural significance to Native Hawaiians is also a key focus, as they have worked to reclaim the land for traditional uses, including cultural and ceremonial purposes.

Historical population
| Year | Pop. | ±% |
|---|---|---|
| 1832 | 80 | — |
| 1836 | 80 | +0.0% |
| 1866 | 18 | −77.5% |
| 1910 | 2 | −88.9% |
| 1920 | 3 | +50.0% |
| 1930 | 2 | −33.3% |
| 1940 | 1 | −50.0% |
| 1950 | 0 | −100.0% |
| 1960 | 0 | 0.00% |
| 1970 | 0 | 0.00% |
| 1980 | 0 | 0.00% |
| 1990 | 0 | 0.00% |
| 2000 | 0 | 0.00% |
| 2010 | 0 | 0.00% |
| 2020 | 0 | 0.00% |
U.S. Decennial Census; 1832, 1836, & 1866 Hawaiian Censuses; Source: Manoa Library

The U.S. Census Bureau defines Kahoʻolawe as Block Group 9, Census Tract 303.02 of Maui County, Hawaii.

== Kahoʻolawe Island Reserve ==
In 1993, the Hawaiian State Legislature established the Kahoʻolawe Island Reserve, consisting of "the entire island and its surrounding ocean waters in a two mile (three km) radius from the shore". By state law, Kahoʻolawe and its waters can be used only for Native Hawaiian cultural, spiritual, and subsistence purposes; fishing; environmental restoration; historic preservation; and education. All commercial uses are prohibited.

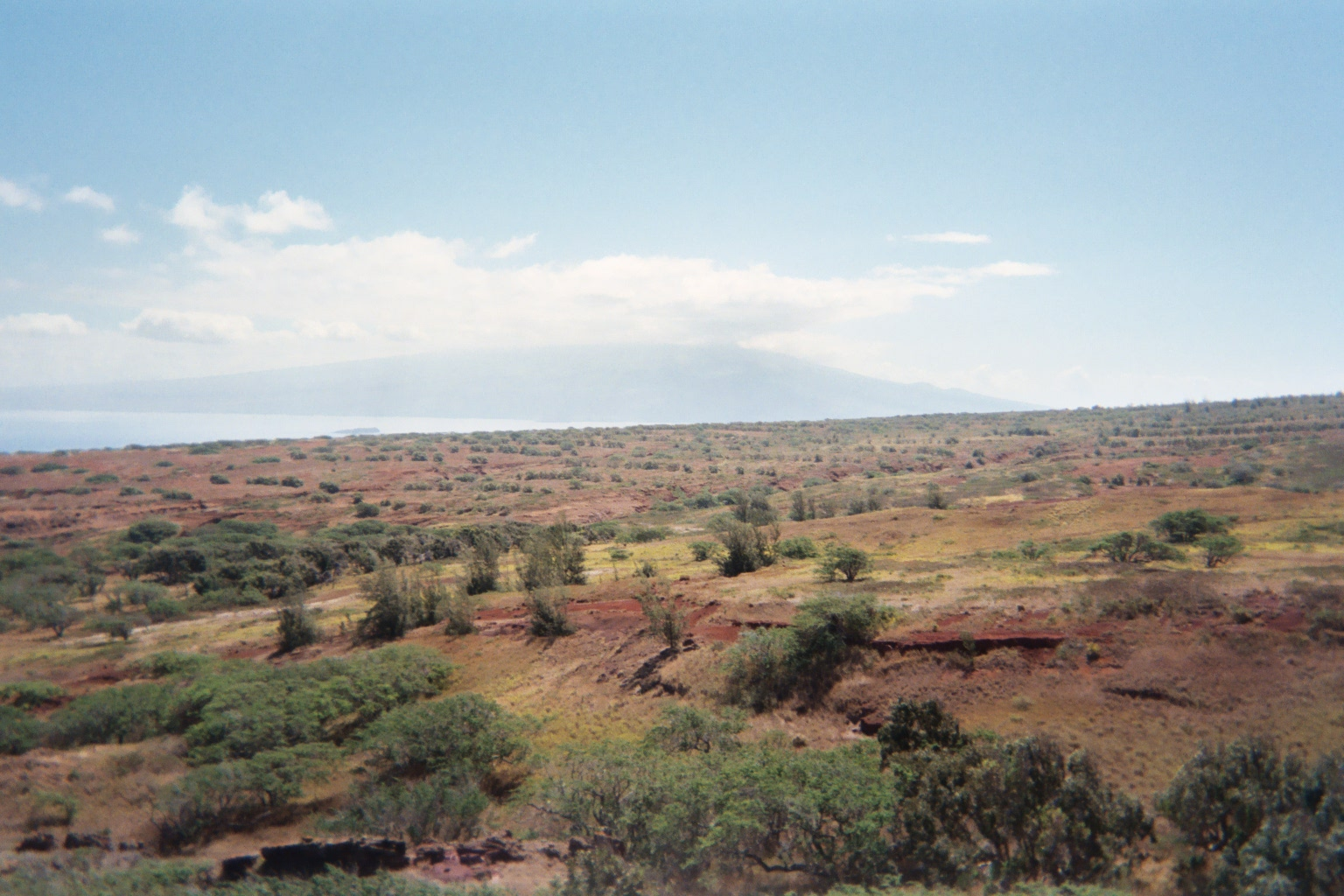
Kaho'olawe vegetation

The legislature also created the Kahoʻolawe Island Reserve Commission to manage the reserve. The restoration of Kahoʻolawe will require a strategy to control erosion, re-establish vegetation, recharge the water table, and gradually replace alien plants with native species. Plans will include methods for damming gullies and reducing rainwater runoff. In some areas, non-native plants will temporarily stabilize soils before planting of permanent native species. Species used for revegetation include ʻaʻaliʻi (Dodonaea viscosa), ʻāheahea (Chenopodium oahuense), kuluʻī (Nototrichium sandwicense), Achyranthes splendens, ʻūlei (Osteomeles anthyllidifolia), kāmanomano (Cenchrus agrimonioides var. agrimonioides), koaiʻa (Acacia koaia), and alaheʻe (Psydrax odorata).

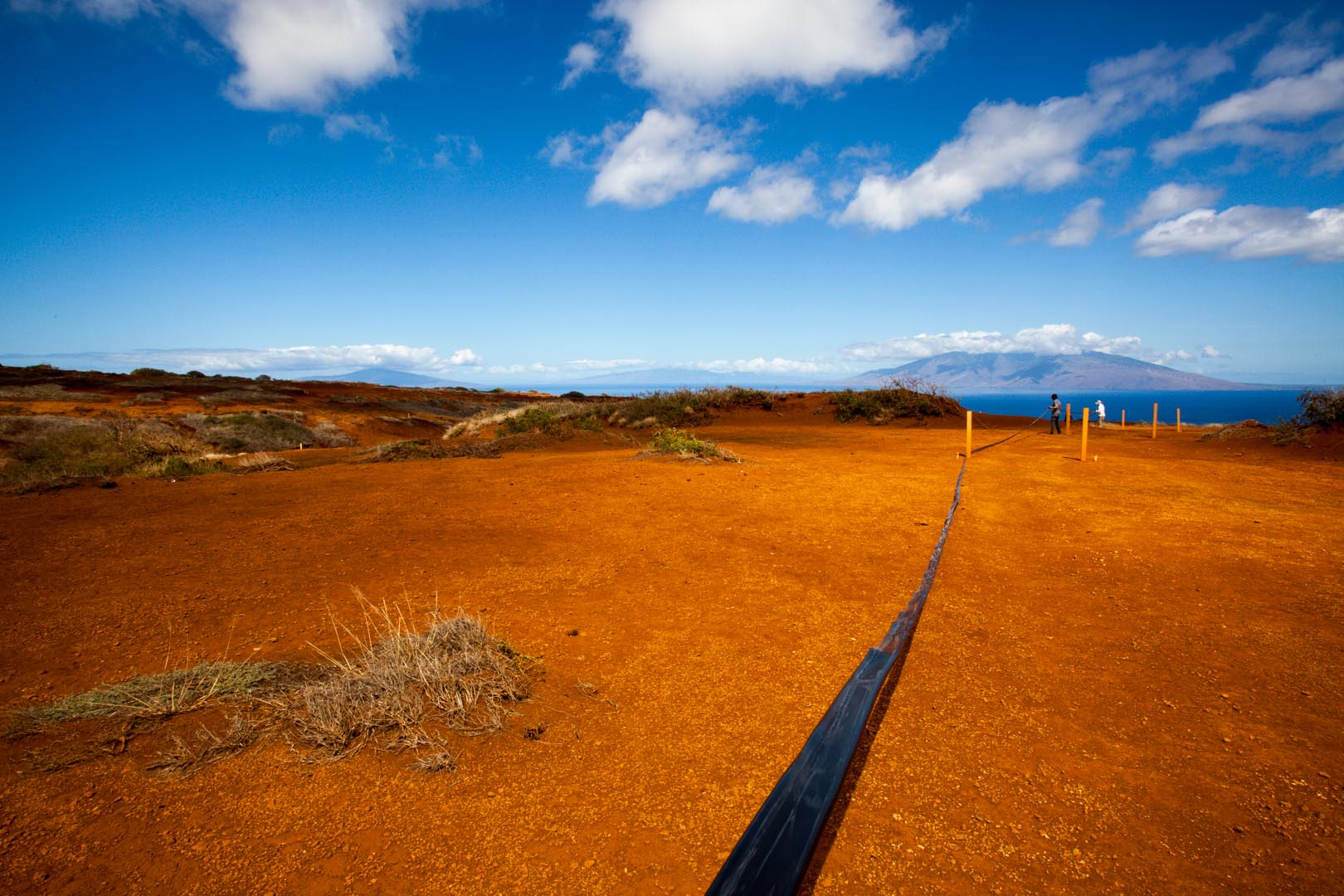
Irrigation tubing running atop the red soil of Kahoʻolawe as a crew works to plant new life in the hard-packed ground

In July 2015, a Business Plan for the Restoration of Hawaiian Bird Life and Native Ecosystems on Kaho‘olawe was proposed in partnership with KIRC, Island Conservation, DLNR, The Nature Conservancy, Protect Kaho‘olawe ‘Ohana, HDOA, American Bird Conservancy, and USFWS. The plan outlines the restoration of Kaho‘olawe Island through the removal of feral cats (Felis catus), rats (Rattus exulans) and mice (Mus musculus). The document investigates and addresses the biological, cultural, financial, and regulatory implications associated with the eradication.

== Traditional subdivisions ==
Traditionally, Kahoʻolawe has been an ahupuaʻa of Honuaʻula, one of the twelve moku of the island (mokupuni) of Maui, and was subdivided into twelve ʻili that were later combined to eight. The eight ʻili are listed below, in counterclockwise sequence, and original area figures in acres, starting in the northeast:

| Nr. | ʻili | Area acres | Area km^{2} |
|---|---|---|---|
| 1 | Hakioawa | 2283 | 9.24 |
| 2 | Papaka | 1443 | 5.84 |
| 3 | Kūheia-Kaulana | 3429 | 13.88 |
| 4 | Ahupū | 4351 | 17.61 |
| 5 | Honokoa | 1701 | 6.88 |
| 6 | Kealaikahiki | 3276 | 13.26 |
| 7 | Kūnaka-Naʻalapa | 9626 | 38.96 |
| 8 | Kanapou | 2511 | 10.16 |
| 9 | (Luamakika) | 156 | 0.63 |
| | Kahoʻolawe | 28776 | 116.46 |

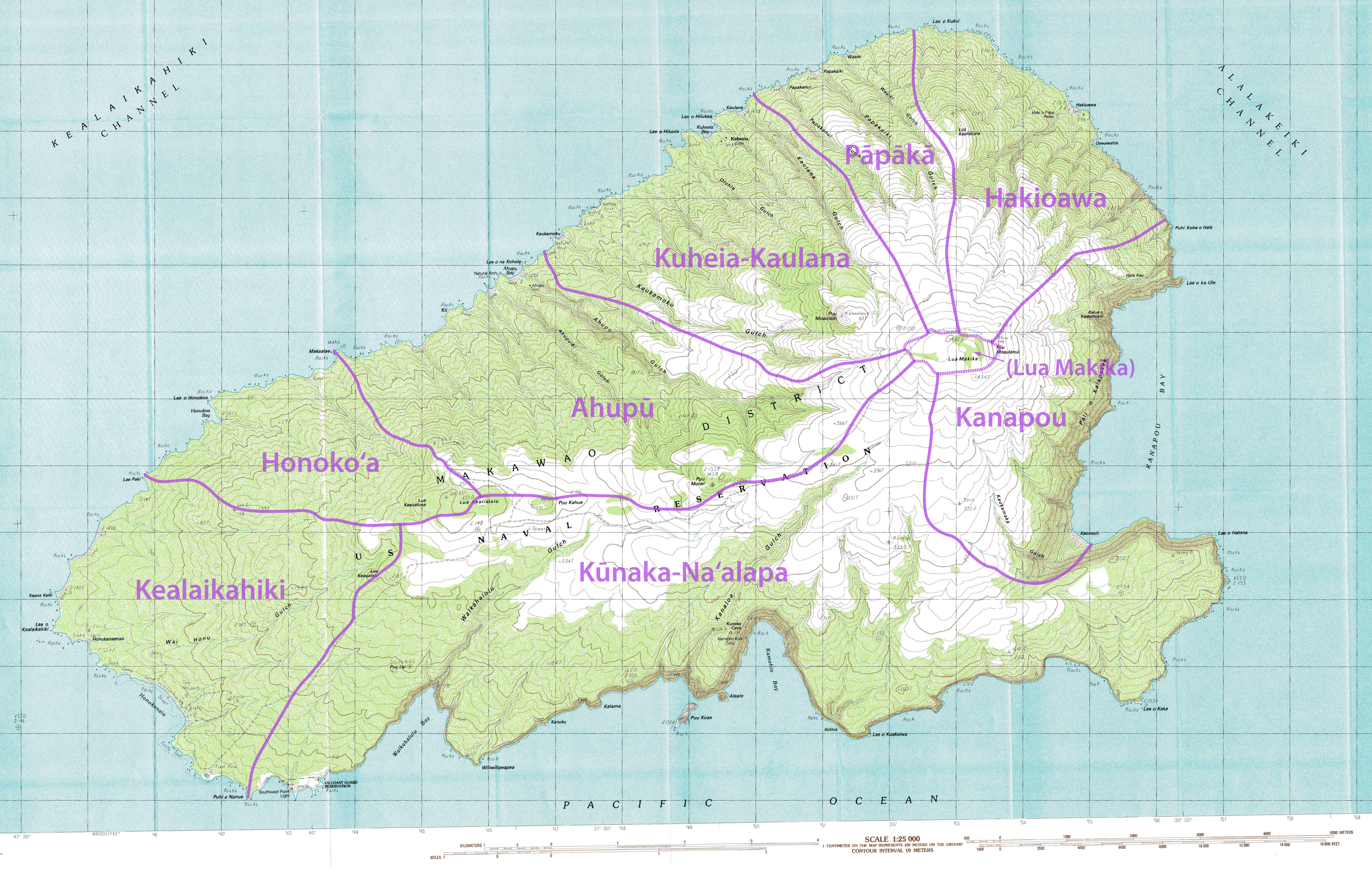
Topographical map of Kahoʻolawe with traditional ʻili subdivisions

The boundaries of all but the two westernmost ʻili converge on the crater rim of Luamakika, but do not include it. The crater area of Luamakika is not considered an ʻili and does not belong to any ʻili.

According to other sources, the island was subdivided into 16 ahupuaʻa that belonged to three moku, namely Kona, Koʻolau and Molokini.

== See also ==
- ʻAlalakeiki Channel
- National Register of Historic Places listings in Hawaii - Kahoʻolawe
- Vieques, Puerto Rico - a smaller island that was also the site of US Navy bombings and protests against them.
- Desert island
- List of islands

== Bibliography ==
- Coffman, Tom (2003). The Island Edge of America: A Political History of Hawai'i. University of Hawaii Press. ISBN 0-8248-2662-0.
- Juvik, Sonia P.; James O. Juvik; Thomas R. Paradise (1998). Atlas of Hawaii. University of Hawaii Press. ISBN 978-0-8248-2125-8.
- Levin, Wayne; Roland B. Reeve (1995). Kaho'olawe Na Leo O Kanaloa: Chants and Stories of Kaho'olawe. ʻAi Pohaku Press. ISBN 1-883528-01-1.
- MacDonald, Peter (1972). "Fixed in Time: A Brief History of Kahoolawe". Hawaiian Journal of History. 6. Honolulu: Hawaiian Historical Society: 69–90. hdl:10125/6328.
- Napier, A. Kam (November 2006). "On Kahoʻolawe". Honolulu Magazine. PacificBasin Communications.
- Ritte, Jr., Walter; Sawyer, Richard (1978). Na Manaʻo Aloha o Kahoʻolawe: Hawaiʻi Warriors Love for Land and Culture. Honolulu, HI, USA: Aloha 'Aina o na Kupuna, Inc. ASIN B0006Y07P8. OCLC 8661294.
- Sano, H; Sherrod, D; Tagami, T (2006). "Youngest volcanism about 1 million years ago at Kahoolawe Island, Hawaii". Journal of Volcanology and Geothermal Research. 152 (1–2). PacificBasin Communications: 91–96. Bibcode:2006JVGR..152...91S. doi:10.1016/j.jvolgeores.2005.10.001.
- Tavares, Hannibal M.; Noa Emmett Aluli; A. Frenchy DeSoto; James A. Kelly; H. Howard Stephenson (1993). Kaho'olawe Island: Restoring a Cultural Treasure. Final Report of the Kaho'olawe Island Conveyance Commission to the Congress of the United States. Kaho'olawe Island Conveyance Commission.
