= Jonathan Kamakawiwoʻole Osorio =

Native Hawaiian professor of Hawaiian studies

Jonathan Kamakawiwoʻole Osorio (b. 1949-1950) is a Native Hawaiian professor of Hawaiian studies and musician. He was the Dean of the Hawaiʻinuiākea School of Hawaiian Knowledge at the University of Hawaiʻi at Mānoa from 2017 until 2025.

== Early life and education ==
Osorio was born in Hilo. While attending Kamehemeha Schools he learned to play the guitar. He graduated in 1969.

== Career ==
In 1974 he formed a duo called "Jon & Randy" with fellow musician Randy Borden. Their song "Hawaiian eyes" won a Na Hoku Hanohano award in 1981.

In 1984 Osorio returned to school. He earned a PhD in history from the University of Hawaiʻi at Mānoa. He taught Hawaiian studies at the university and Kapiʻolani Community College. He became the Dean of the Hawaiʻinuiākea School of Hawaiian Knowledge in 2018. While working as a professor, Osorio also attended protests against the Thirty Meter Telescope. Osorio's work as a professor and musician intertwine; he often sings a song during his interviews, conference presentations, forums, and other engagements.

In 2019 he was awarded the Lifetime Achievement Award by the Hawaiʻi Academy of Recording Arts.

In 2025, after 8 years of being the Dean of Hawaiʻinuiākea School of Hawaiian Knowledge, he announced that he was stepping down to return to teaching.

== Bibliography ==
- Osorio, Jonathan Kamakawiwoʻole; Young, Kanalu G. T. (1997). Lei Mele No Pauahi: Music, Past and Present, at Kamehameha Schools. Kamehameha Schools. ISBN 9780873360500.
- Howes, Craig; Osorio, Jon, eds. (2010). The Value of Hawaiʻi: Knowing the Past, Shaping the Future. Honolulu: University of Hawaiʻi Press. ISBN 9780824835293.
- Osorio, Jonathan Kay Kamakawiwo‘ole (2002). Dismembering Lahui: A History of the Hawaiian Nation to 1887. University of Hawai'i Press. ISBN 978-0824825492.
- Osorio, Jonathan, ed. (2014). I ulu i ka ʻāina = Land. Honolulu: University of Hawaiʻi Press. ISBN 9780824839772.
- Goodyear-Kaʻōpua, Noelani; Howes, Craig; Osorio, Jonathan Kay Kamakawiwoʻole; Yamashiro, Aiko, eds. (2021). The Value of Hawaiʻi 3: Hulihia, the Turning. Honolulu: University of Hawaiʻi Press. ISBN 9780824889067.
