= Overwhelmingly Large Telescope =

Proposed extremely large telescope

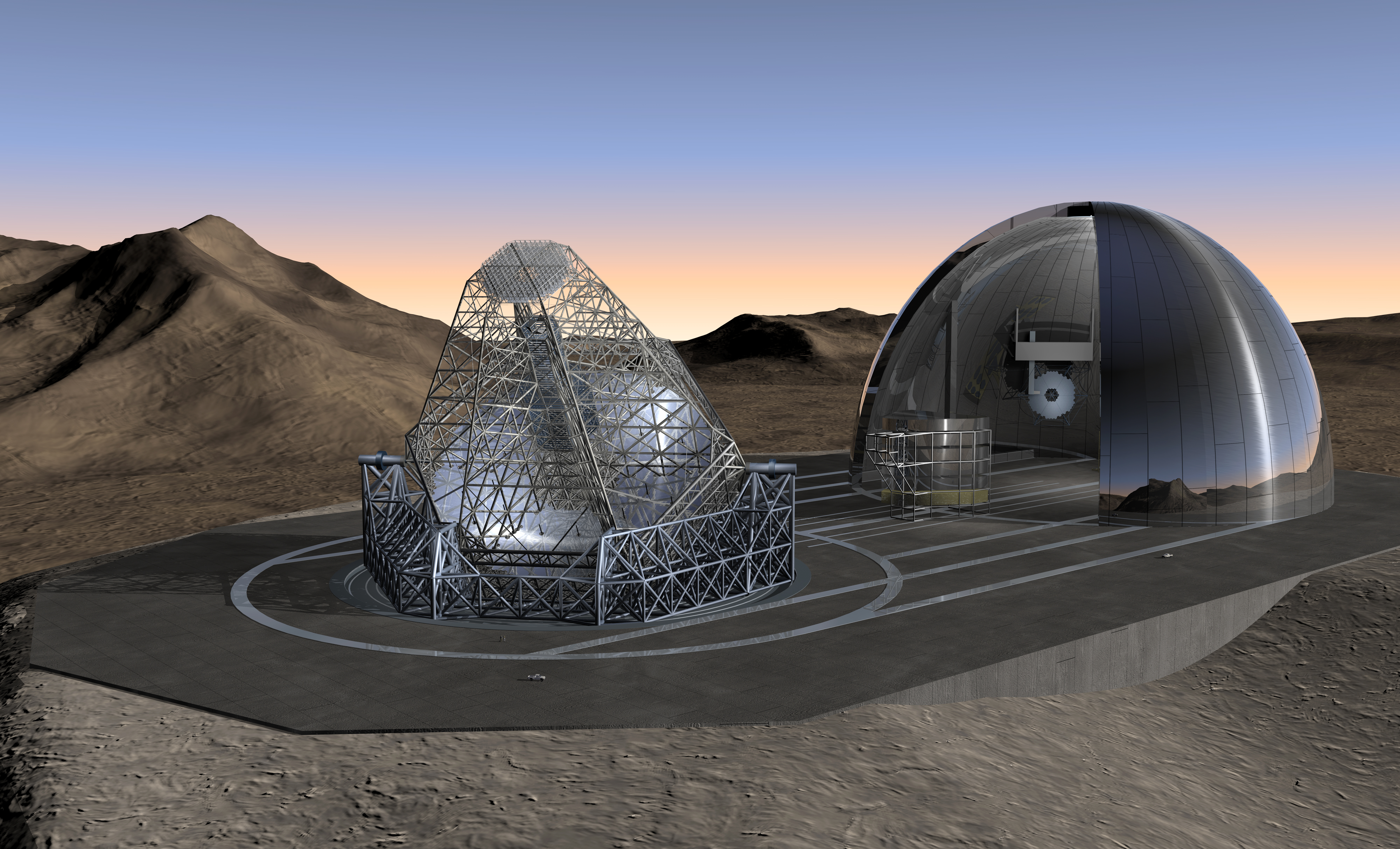
- Alternative names: OWL
- Wavelength: 0.32 μm (940 THz)–12 μm (25 THz)
- Diameter: 60, 100 m (196 ft 10 in, 328 ft 1 in)
- Collecting area: 2,827, 7,854 m^{2} (30,430, 84,540 sq ft)
- Focal length: 175 m (574 ft 2 in)
- Website: www.eso.org/sci/facilities/eelt/owl/
- Related media on Commons

Comparison of nominal sizes of apertures of the Overwhelmingly Large Telescope and some notable optical telescopes

The Overwhelmingly Large Telescope (OWL) was a conceptual design by the European Southern Observatory (ESO) organisation for an extremely large telescope, which was intended to have a single aperture of 100 metres in diameter. Because of the complexity, cost, and risk of building a telescope of this unprecedented size, ESO decided to focus on the 39-metre diameter Extremely Large Telescope instead.

== History ==
OWL was first proposed in 1998, and at that time was estimated to be technologically feasible by 2010–2015.

While the original 100 m design would not exceed the angular resolving power of interferometric telescopes, it would have exceptional light-gathering and imaging capacity. The OWL could be expected to regularly see astronomical objects with an apparent magnitude of 38, or 1,500 times fainter than the faintest object that has been detected by the Hubble Space Telescope.

All proposed designs for the OWL are variations on a segmented mirror, since there is no technology available to build and transport a monolithic 60- or 100-meter mirror. The operation of a segmented mirror is somewhat more complicated than that of a monolithic one, requiring careful alignment of the segments (a technique called cophasing). Experience gained in existing segmented mirrors (for example, the Keck telescope) suggests that the mirror proposed for the OWL is feasible. However, the projected cost (of around €1.5 billion) was considered too high, so the ESO is now building the smaller Extremely Large Telescope 39.5 m in diameter. Also, the realism of the estimated construction costs of the OWL has been questioned, with some estimating its cost an order of magnitude higher (the 39m ELT currently at €1.3 billion, equivalent to around $1.3 billion, scaled using D^{2.77} proportionality assuming a 100 meter diameter yields $21 billion).

It has been estimated that a telescope with a diameter of 80 meters would be able to spectroscopically analyse Earth-size planets around the forty nearest sun-like stars. As such, this telescope could help in the exploration of exoplanets and extraterrestrial life (because the spectrum from the planets could reveal the presence of molecules indicative of life).

== See also ==
- Active optics
- Adaptive optics
- Extremely Large Telescope
- Giant Magellan Telescope
- List of optical telescopes
- List of largest optical reflecting telescopes
- Thirty Meter Telescope
