= California Extremely Large Telescope =

1990s astronomical observatory proposal

The California Extremely Large Telescope (CELT) was a proposal for an extremely large telescope design first proposed in the 1990s by a consortium of Californian Universities. The design was for a segmented 30 m diameter astronomical telescope. The CELT had a positive reception and continued to be developed, and was renamed the Thirty Meter Telescope (TMT) around 2003–4. The CELT was one of the earlier and more successful proposals for extremely large telescopes.

The optical design for CELT is a Ritchey-Chretien two-mirror system, with a segmented mirror mosaic with 1080 segments. This rather naturally provides a large, 20 arcminute field of view with less than 0.5 arcsecond images (100% enclosed energy). This focus is free of coma and only suffers from astigmatism, which grows quadratically with field angle. The primary was planned to be 30 metres (98 ft) in diameter, and for compactness, the primary f-number will be f/1.5. The final focus will be f/15, delivering a final focus with about 2 mm/arcsecond as its plate scale. Such a giant telescope produces very large seeing-limited images, a challenge for the design of seeing-limited scientific instruments. The 20 arcminute field is 2.6 metres (8.5 ft) in diameter.

CELT was one of three ELT projects that combined to start the TMT project. The other two projects were VLOT (Very Large Optical Telescope) and GSMT (Giant Segmented Mirror Telescope). Another large telescope proposal in this era was the Euro50 design.

== See also ==
- Extremely large telescope, a large telescope class
- Colossus Telescope (70 m plan in the 2010s)
