= OpTIIX =

NASA project

OpTIIX (Optical Testbed and Integration on ISS eXperiment) is a NASA project to advance the state of the art in technology for the robotic assembly of optical systems, by assembling a 1.5-metre telescope on the International Space Station.

The telescope will consist of six segments, with active co-phasing and figure control to achieve performance like a single large telescope; this would be the first civilian use of this kind of segmented mirror in space.
