= Jerry Nelson (astronomer) =

American astronomer (1944–2017)

- Born: January 15, 1944; Los Angeles County, California, U.S.
- Died: June 10, 2017 (aged 73); Santa Cruz, California, U.S.
- Education: California Institute of Technology, University of California, Berkeley
- Known for: segmented mirror telescopes
- Awards: Dannie Heineman Prize for Astrophysics (1995); Kavli Prize for Astrophysics (2010)
- Scientific career
- Fields: astronomy
- Workplaces: Lick Observatory, University of California, Santa Cruz

Jerry Earl Nelson (January 15, 1944 – June 10, 2017) was an American astronomer known for his pioneering work designing segmented mirror telescopes, which led to him sharing the 2010 Kavli Prize for Astrophysics.

He was the principal designer and project scientist for the Keck telescopes.

== Education ==
Nelson was born in Los Angeles County on January 15, 1944. As a high school student in 1960, Nelson got an early start in astronomy when he attended the Summer Science Program where he studied under astronomers Paul Routly and George Abell. Growing up in Kagel Canyon outside of Los Angeles, he was the first child from his town to go to college.

He got his B.S. in physics from the California Institute of Technology in 1965 and his Ph.D. in elementary particle physics from University of California, Berkeley in 1972. While at Caltech, he helped to design and build a 1.5 metres (59 in) telescope.

== Career ==
In 1977, when Nelson worked in the Physics Division of the Lawrence Berkeley National Laboratory, he was appointed to a five-person committee to design a 10-metre (33 ft) telescope, twice the diameter of the biggest telescope of the time. He concluded that only a segmented design would be sensible to overcome structural difficulties. His design had 36 hexagonal mirror segments, each six feet in diameter and just three inches thick. This led to the creation of the revolutionary twin 10-meter Keck telescopes.

"The Hale Telescope was very innovative for its day, but in terms of advancing the state of the art--or at least pushing the available technology to its limits--it's been downhill ever since for optical telescopes. It is time for a forward step, not just making improvements in an old design."

—Jerry Nelson

Segments solved the structural problem but created a new one involving the alignment of the segments. To deal with this, Nelson contributed to the design of an alignment system that used 168 electronic sensors mounted on the edges of the hexagonal mirror segments and 108 motor-driven adjusting mechanisms to continually keep the mirror system in the correct shape.

His proposal was met with skepticism. It was felt that the scheme was too complex to ever work. Eventually, Nelson overcame the doubts by building working prototypes.

Nelson became a professor at UC Santa Cruz in 1994. In 1999, he was the founding Director of the Center for Adaptive Optics at UCSC.

In 2010, he shared the million dollar Kavli Prize for Astrophysics for his work on segmented mirrors.

"This is a most well-deserved award. Jerry Nelson first revolutionized astronomy when he invented the segmented mirror design for the Keck Telescopes; he continued with his outstanding work on adaptive optics, and he is about to transform astronomy again through his leading role in the Thirty Meter Telescope project, his work has made possible an era of incredible discoveries in astronomy."

—UCSC Chancellor George R. Blumenthal

Nelson died in Santa Cruz, California on June 10, 2017.

== Awards ==
- 1995 Dannie Heineman Prize for Astrophysics
- 1995 California Institute of Technology Distinguished Alumni
- 1996 Joseph Fraunhofer Award and Robert M. Burley Prize from the Optical Society of America
- 1998 Grand Prix Andre Lallemand awarded by the French Academy of Sciences
- 2010 Kavli Prize for Astrophysics and fellowship of the Norwegian Academy of Science and Letters.
- 2012 Benjamin Franklin Medal in Electrical Engineering from the Franklin Institute.
