= Cophasing =

Segmented mirror/telescope-related individual segment-controlling process in astronomy

In astronomy, the term cophasing or phasing describes the process of controlling the individual segments in a segmented mirror or a telescope so that the segments form a larger composite mirroring surface. Cophasing implies precise, active control of three degrees of freedom of each individual segment mirror: translation along the optical axis (piston) and rotation about two axes perpendicular to the optical axis (tip-tilt).

Each segment of the segmented telescope is a solid body having 6 degrees of freedom exposed to the gravitation force, wind blowing, and other mechanical forces. If the position of each segment is not controlled the resolution of the whole telescope will be the same as if the telescope had the diameter equal to the size of one segment. To achieve a resolution commensurable with that of a monolithic telescope of the same diameter the segmented surface must be controlled with a precision better than $\lambda/40$ surface rms.

Projects for future extremely large telescopes (ELTs) generally depend on the use of a segmented primary mirror. While the basic technologies required for segmented telescopes have been demonstrated for the 10m Keck telescope or GTC telescope, ELTs of diameters from 50 to 100 m represent a qualitative change with respect to wave front control related to segmentation in comparison with the current 10 meter technology.
