= Extremely Large Telescope =

Major astronomical facility in Chile

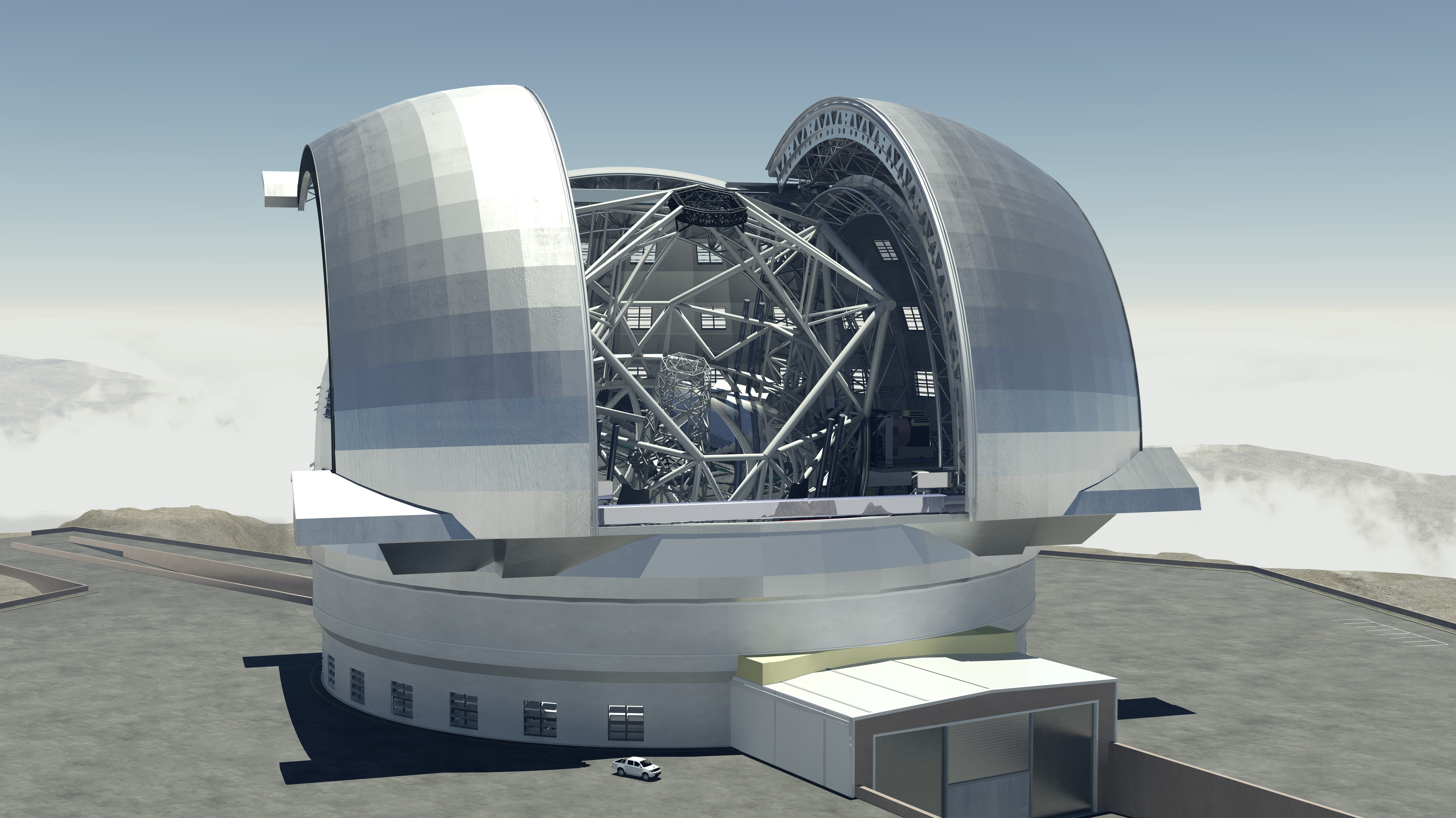
- Artist's impression of the ELT
- Alternative names: ELT
- Location: Cerro Armazones, Antofagasta Province, Antofagasta Region, Chile
- Coordinates: 24°35′21″S 70°11′30″W
- Altitude: 3,046 m (9,993 ft)
- Wavelength: optical to mid-infrared
- Built: 26 May 2017–
- Diameter: 39.5 m (129 ft 7 in)
- Secondary diameter: 4.09 m (13 ft 5 in)
- Tertiary diameter: 3.75 m (12 ft 4 in)
- Angular resolution: 0.005 arcsecond
- Collecting area: 978 m^{2} (10,530 sq ft)
- Focal length: 684.022 m (2,244 ft 2.0 in)
- Mounting: Elevation over azimuth
- Enclosure: 86 metres diameter, 74 metres height
- Website: elt.eso.org
- Location within Chile
- Related media on Commons

The Extremely Large Telescope (ELT) is an astronomical observatory under construction. When completed, it will be the world's largest optical and mid-infrared extremely large telescope. Part of the European Southern Observatory (ESO) agency, it is located on top of Cerro Armazones in the Atacama Desert of northern Chile, 23 km from the existing facilities at Paranal Observatory.

The design consists of a reflecting telescope with a 39.3-metre-diameter (130-foot) segmented primary mirror and a 4.25 m (14 ft) diameter secondary mirror. The telescope is equipped with adaptive optics, six laser guide star units, and various large-scale scientific instruments. The observatory's design will gather 100 million times more light than the human eye, equivalent to about 10 times more light than the largest optical telescopes in existence as of 2025, with the ability to correct for atmospheric distortion. It has around 250 times the light-gathering area of the Hubble Space Telescope and, according to the ELT's specifications, will provide images 15 times sharper than those from Hubble.

The project was originally called the European Extremely Large Telescope (E-ELT), but the name was shortened in 2017. The ELT is intended to advance astrophysical knowledge by enabling detailed studies of planets around other stars, the first galaxies in the Universe, supermassive black holes, the nature of the Universe's dark sector, and to detect water and organic molecules in protoplanetary disks around other stars. As planned in 2011, the facility was expected to take 11 years to construct, from 2014 to 2025.

On 11 June 2012, the ESO Council approved the ELT programme's plans to begin civil works at the telescope site, with the construction of the telescope itself pending final agreement with governments of some member states. Construction work on the ELT site started in June 2014. By December 2014, ESO had secured over 90% of the total funding and authorized construction of the telescope to start, estimated to cost around one billion euros for the first construction phase. The first stone of the telescope was ceremonially laid on 26 May 2017, initiating the construction of the dome's main structure and telescope. The telescope passed the halfway point in its development and construction in July 2023, with the expected completion and first light set for March 2029.

== History ==
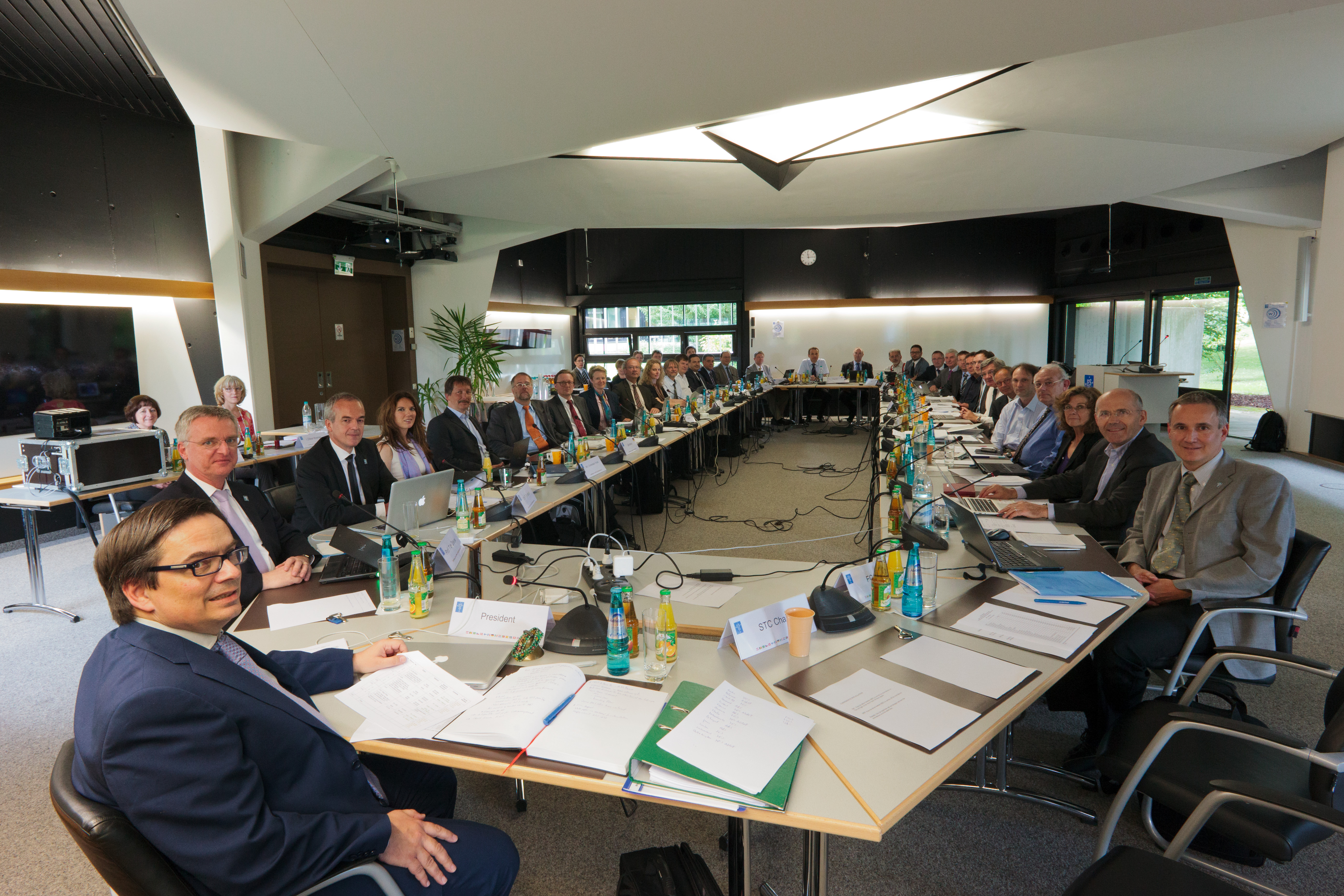
ESO Council meets at ESO headquarters in Garching bei München, Germany, 2012

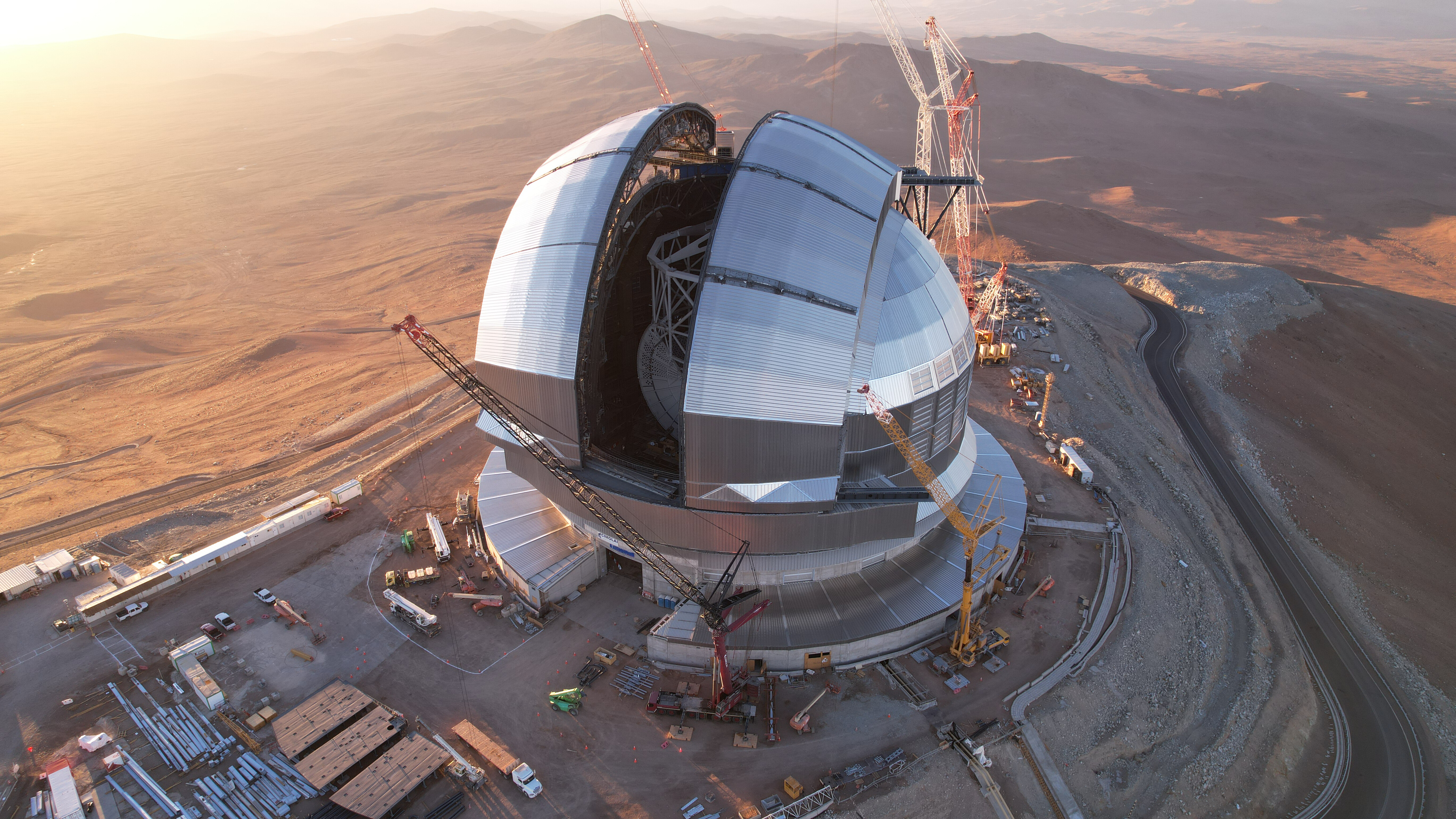
ELT construction status in April 2026

On 26 April 2010, the European Southern Observatory (ESO) Council selected Cerro Armazones, Chile, as the baseline site for the planned ELT. Other sites that were under discussion included Cerro Macon, Salta, in Argentina; Roque de los Muchachos Observatory, on the Canary Islands; and sites in North Africa, Morocco, and Antarctica.

Early designs included a segmented primary mirror with a diameter of 42 metres (140 feet) and an area of about 1,300 m^{2} (14,000 ft^{2}), with a secondary mirror with a diameter of 5.9 m (19 ft). However, in 2011 a proposal was put forward to reduce overall size by 13% to 978 m^{2}, with a 39 m (130 ft) diameter primary mirror and a 4.2 m (14 ft) diameter secondary mirror. This reduced projected costs from 1.275 billion to 1.055 billion euros and should allow the telescope to be finished sooner. The smaller secondary is a particularly important change; 4.2 m (14 ft) places it within the capabilities of multiple manufacturers, and the lighter mirror unit avoids the need for high-strength materials in the secondary mirror support spider.

ESO's Director General commented in a 2011 press release that "With the new E-ELT design we can still satisfy the bold science goals and also ensure that the construction can be completed in only 10–11 years." The ESO Council endorsed the revised baseline design in June 2011 and expected a construction proposal for approval in December 2011. Funding was subsequently included in the 2012 budget for initial work to begin in early 2012. The project received preliminary approval in June 2012. ESO approved the start of construction in December 2014, with over 90% funding of the nominal budget secured.

The design phase of the 5-mirror anastigmat was fully funded within the ESO budget. With the 2011 changes in the baseline design (such as a reduction in the size of the primary mirror from 42 m to 39 m), in 2017 the construction cost was estimated to be €1.15 billion (including first generation instruments). In 2014, the start of operations was planned for 2024. Actual construction officially began on 26 May 2017, and a technical first light is planned for March 2029. First scientific observations are planned for December 2030.

== Planning ==
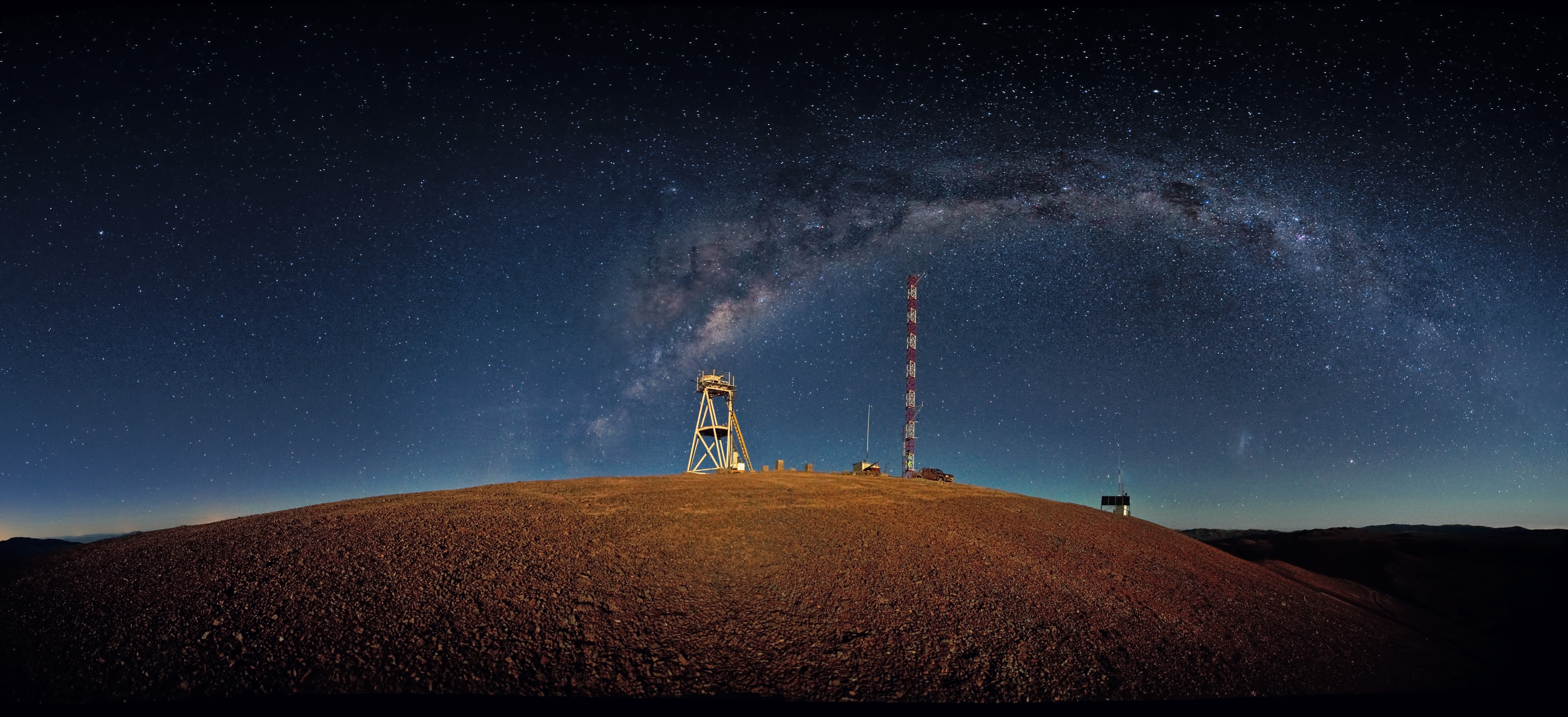
Cerro Armazones at night (2010)

ESO focused on a new design after a feasibility study concluded the proposed 100 m (328 ft) diameter, Overwhelmingly Large Telescope, would cost €1.5 billion (£1 billion), and be too complex. Both existing fabrication technology and road transportation constraints limit single mirrors to being roughly 8 m (26 ft) per piece. The next-largest telescopes in use are the Keck Telescopes, the Gran Telescopio Canarias and the Southern African Large Telescope, which each use small hexagonal mirrors fitted together to make a composite mirror slightly over 10 m (33 ft) across. The ELT uses a similar design, as well as techniques to work around atmospheric distortion of incoming light, known as adaptive optics.

A 40-metre-class mirror will allow the study of the atmospheres of extrasolar planets. The ELT is the highest priority in the European planning activities for research infrastructures, such as the Astronet Science Vision and Infrastructure Roadmap and the ESFRI Roadmap. The telescope underwent a Phase B study in 2014 that included "contracts with industry to design and manufacture prototypes of key elements like the primary mirror segments, the adaptive fourth mirror or the mechanical structure (...) [and] concept studies for eight instruments".

== Design ==
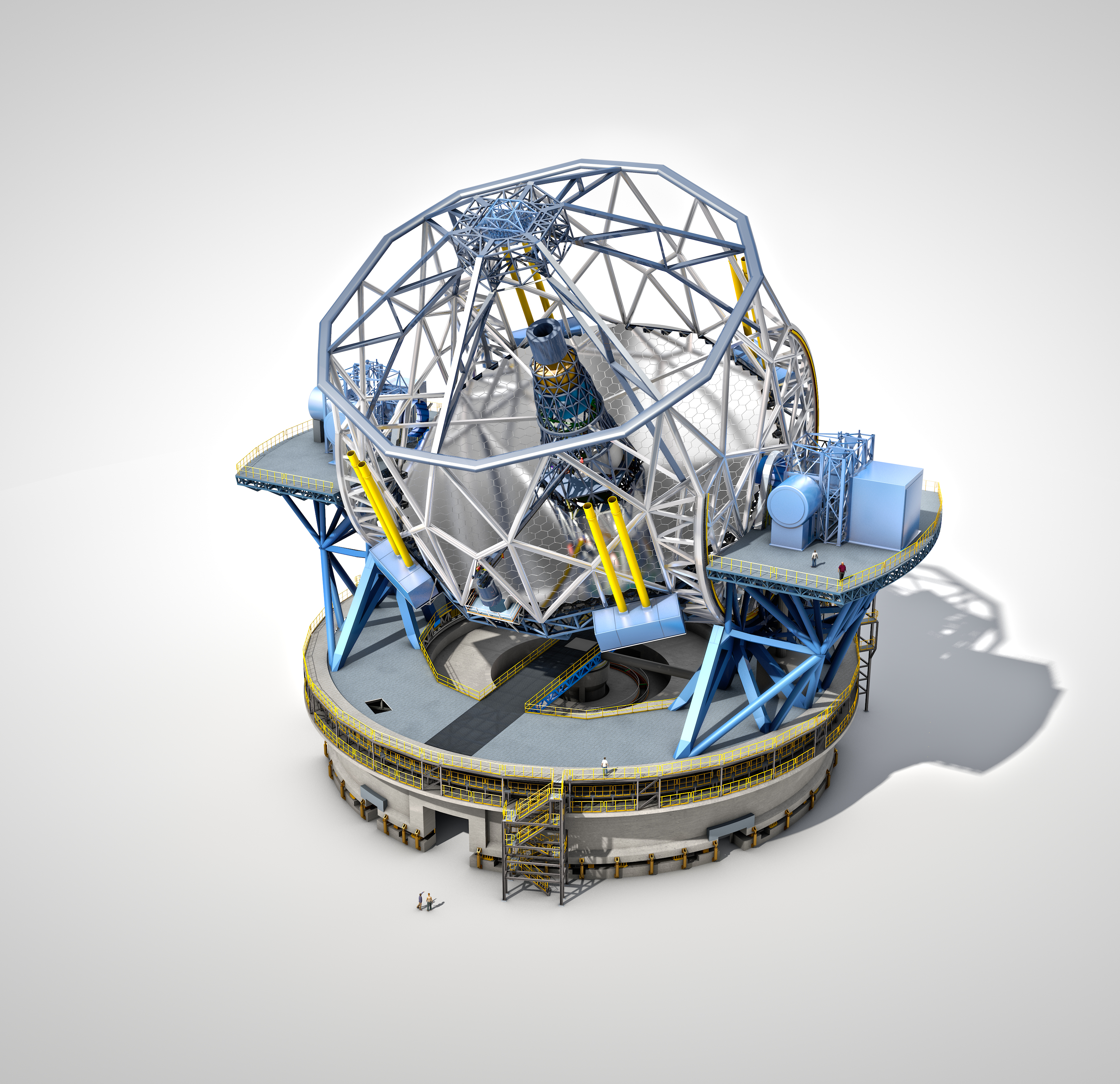
Schematic view of the ELT

The optical system of the ELT showing the location of the mirrors

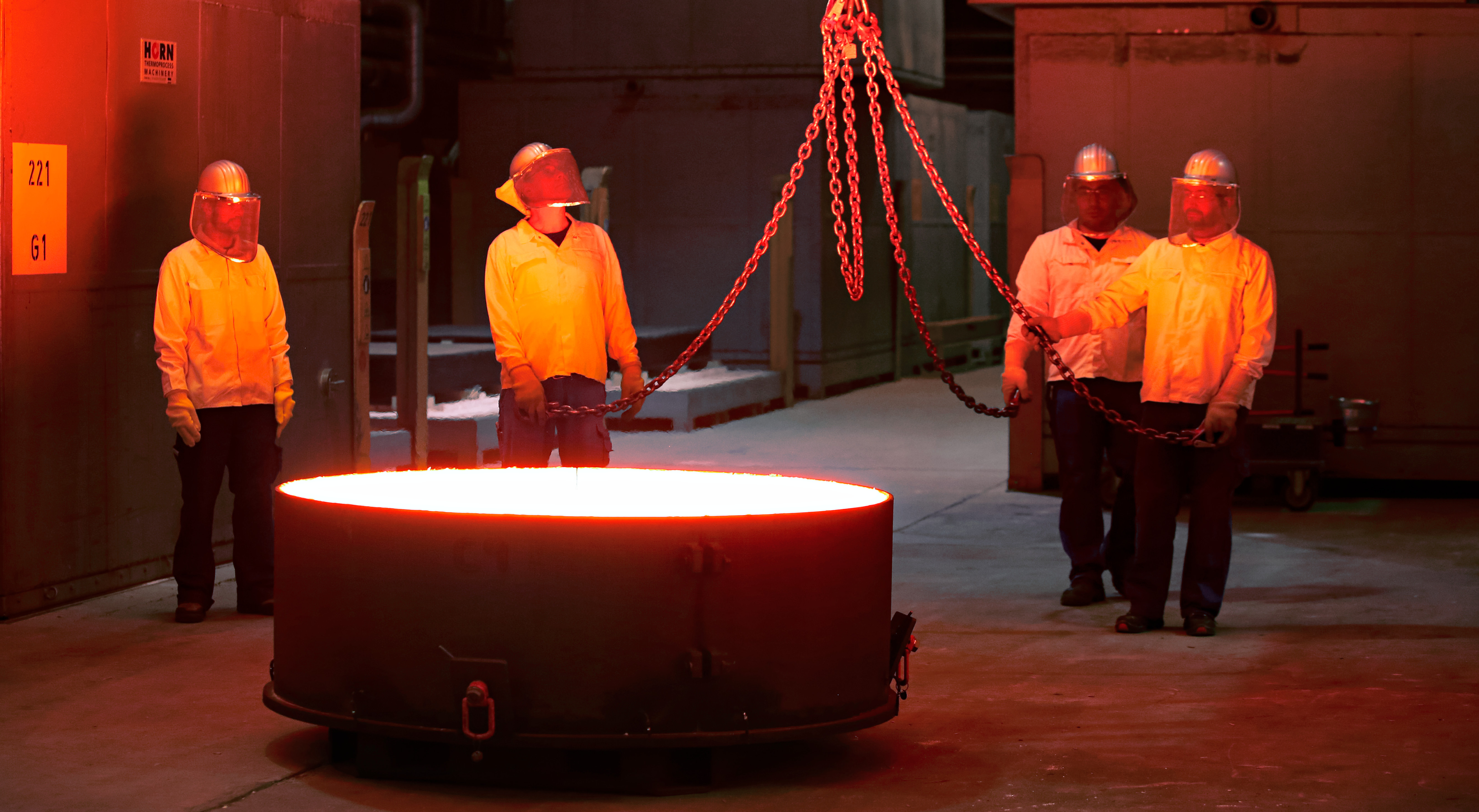
Cast of the first ELT main mirror segments

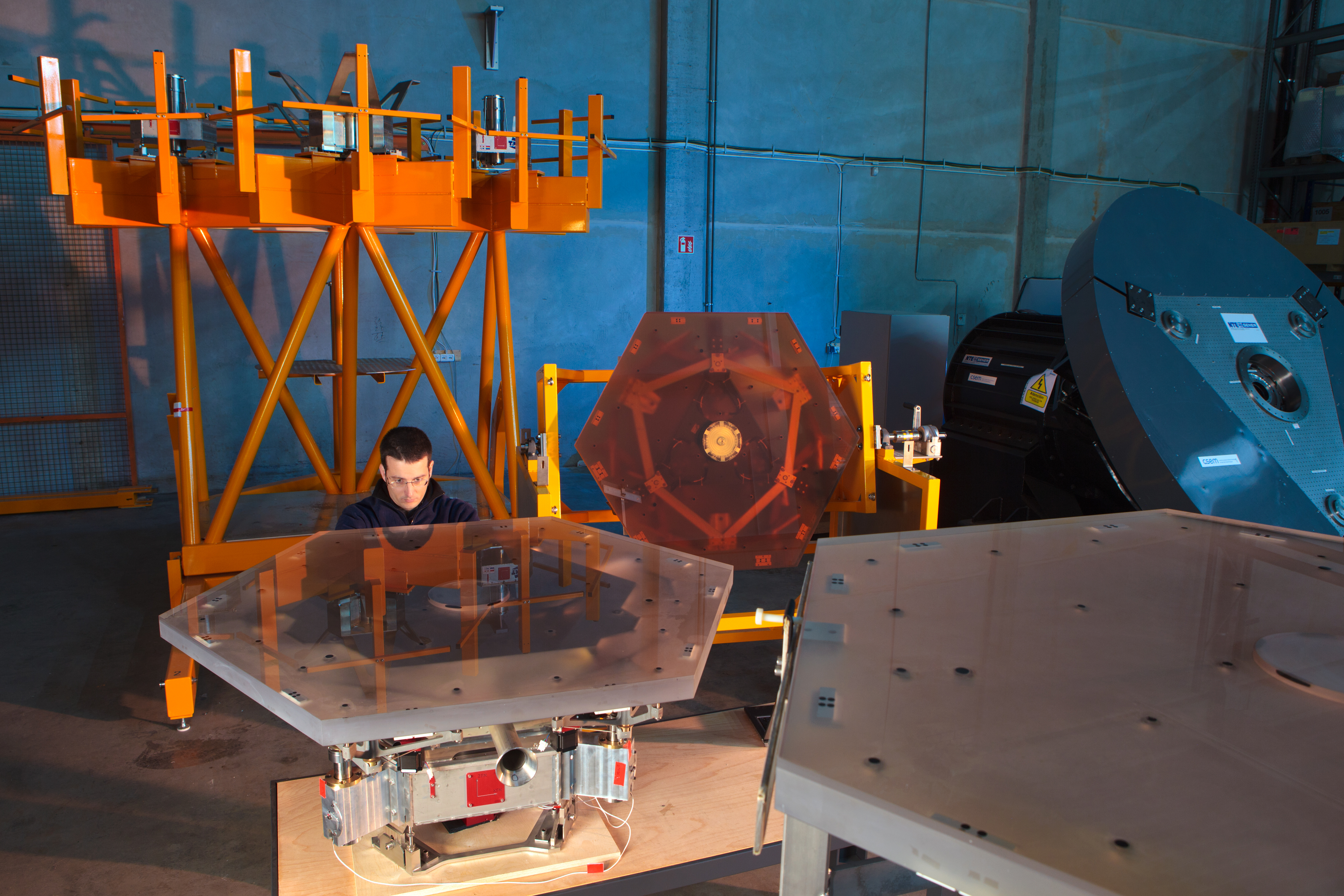
Several segments of the primary mirror

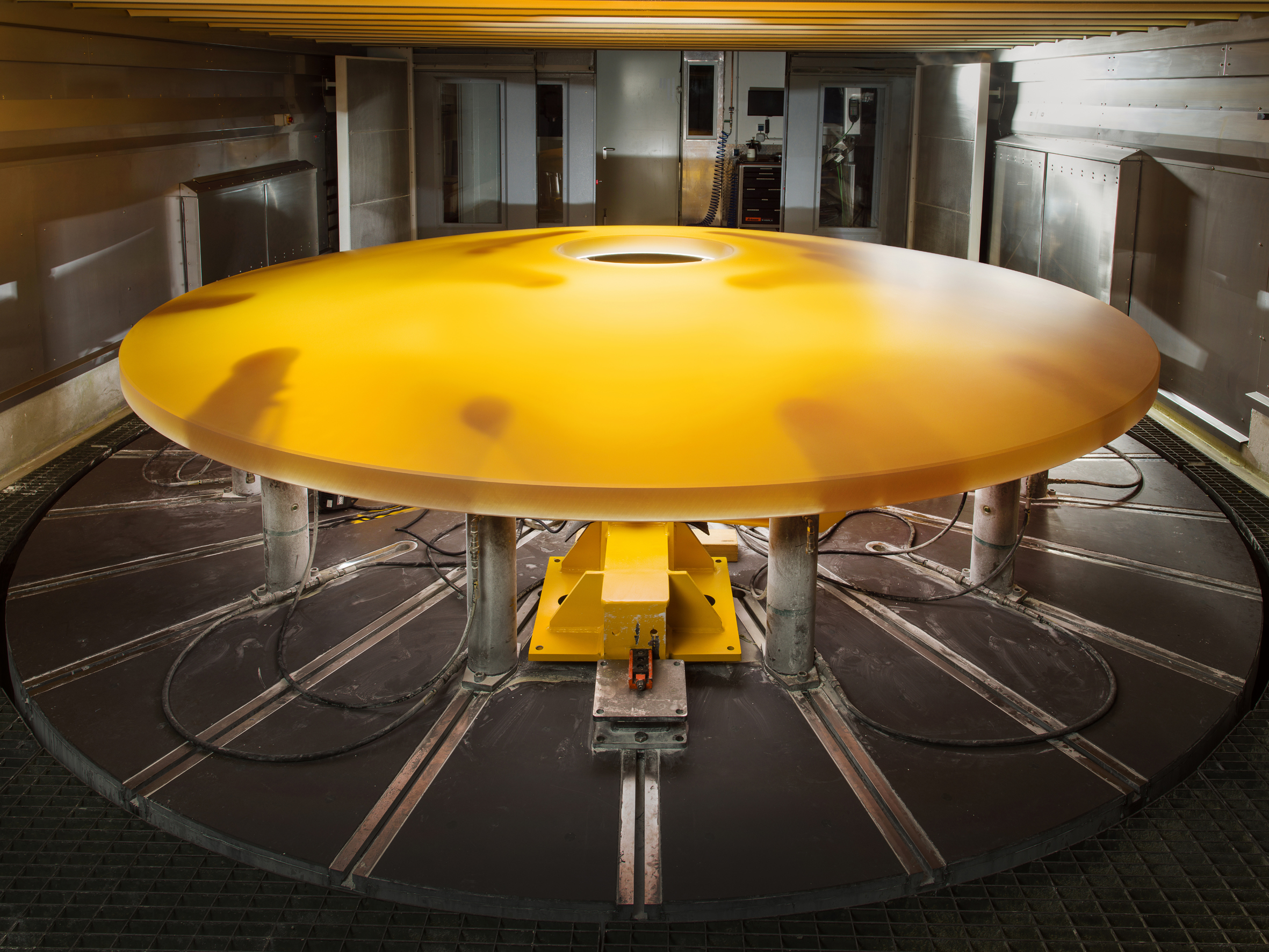
ELT's M2 mirror blank

The ELT will use a novel design with a total of five mirrors. The first three mirrors are curved (non-spherical) and form a three-mirror anastigmat design for excellent image quality over the 10-arcminute field of view (one-third of the width of the full Moon). The fourth and fifth mirrors are flat, and respectively provide adaptive optics correction for atmospheric distortions (mirror 4) and tip-tilt correction for image stabilization (mirror 5). The fourth and fifth mirrors also send the light sideways to one of two Nasmyth focal stations at either side of the telescope structure, allowing multiple large instruments to be mounted simultaneously.

=== Primary mirror ===
The 39.3-metre (129 ft) primary mirror will be composed of 798 hexagonal segments, each approximately 1.45 metres (4.8 ft) across and with a thickness of 50 mm (2.0 in). Two segments will be re-coated and replaced each working day, to keep the mirror always clean and highly reflective.

Edge sensors constantly measure the positions of the primary mirror segments relative to their immediate neighbours. 2394 position actuators (3 for each segment) use this information to adjust the system, keeping the overall surface shape unchanged against deformations caused by external factors such as wind, gravity, temperature changes and vibrations.

In January 2017, ESO awarded the contract for the fabrication of the 4608 edge sensors to the FAMES consortium, which is composed of French company Fogale and German company Micro-Epsilon. These sensors can measure relative positions to an accuracy of a few nanometres, the most accurate ever used in a telescope.

In May 2017, ESO awarded two additional contracts for the segments of the primary mirror. One was awarded to the German company Schott AG who manufactures the blanks of the 798 segments, as well as a maintenance set of 133 additional segments, one for each unique segment shape in the surface. Once the ELT is in operation, the maintenance set allows segments to be removed, replaced, and recoated on a rotating basis without leaving temporary gaps in the surface. The segments were cast from the same low-expansion ceramic Zerodur as the existing Very Large Telescope mirrors in Chile.

The other segment contract was awarded to the French company, Safran Reosc, a subsidiary of Safran Electronics & Defense. They receive the mirror blanks from Schott, and polish one mirror segment per day to meet the 7-year deadline. During this process, each segment is polished until it has no surface irregularity greater than 7.5 nm root mean square. Afterward, Safran Reosc mounts, tests, and completes all optical testing before delivery. This is the second-largest contract for ELT construction and the third-largest contract ESO has ever signed.

The segment support system units for the primary mirror were designed and are produced by CESA (Spain) and VDL (the Netherlands). The contracts signed with ESO also include the delivery of detailed and complete instructions and engineering drawings for their production. Additionally, they include the development of the procedures required to integrate the supports with the ELT glass segments; to handle and transport the segment assemblies; and to operate and maintain them.

As of July 2023, over 70% of the mirror segment blanks and their supporting structures had been manufactured, and by early 2024 tens of segments had been polished.

=== Secondary mirror ===
Making the secondary mirror is a major challenge as it is highly convex, and aspheric. It is also very large; at 4.25 metres (13.9 ft) in diameter and weighing 3.5 tonnes (7,700 lb), it will be the largest secondary mirror ever employed on an optical telescope and the largest convex mirror ever produced.

In January 2017, ESO awarded a contract for the mirror blank to Schott AG, who cast it later the same year from Zerodur. In May 2017, Schott AG was also awarded the contract for the much larger primary segment of the mirror.

Complex support cells are also necessary to ensure the flexible secondary and tertiary mirrors retain their correct shape and position; these support cells will be provided by SENER. Like the tertiary mirror, the secondary mirror will be mounted on 32 points, with 14 along its edges and 18 on the back. The entire assembly will be mounted on a hexapod, allowing its position to be aligned every few minutes to sub-micrometer precision. Deformations on the secondary mirror have a much smaller effect on the final image compared to errors on the tertiary, quaternary, or quinary mirrors.

The pre-formed glass-ceramic blank of the secondary mirror is being polished and tested by Safran Reosc. The mirror will be shaped and polished to a precision of 15 nanometres (15 billionths of a metre) over the optical surface.

By early 2024 this mirror was reported to be close to final accuracy.

=== Tertiary mirror ===
The 4.0-metre (13.1 ft) concave tertiary mirror, also cast from Zerodur, will be an unusual feature of the telescope. Most current large telescopes, including the VLT and the NASA/ESA Hubble Space Telescope but excluding the Vera C. Rubin Observatory, use two curved mirrors to form an image. In these cases, a small, flat tertiary mirror is sometimes introduced to divert the light to a convenient focus. However, in the ELT the tertiary mirror also has a curved surface, as the use of three mirrors delivers a better final image quality over a larger field of view than would be possible with a two-mirror design.

Much like the secondary mirror (with which it shares many design characteristics), the tertiary mirror will be slightly deformable to regularly allow deviations to be corrected. Both mirrors will be mounted on 32 points, with 18 on their backside and 14 along their edges.

As of July 2023, the tertiary mirror had been cast and was being polished.

=== Quaternary mirror ===
The 2.4-metre (7.9 ft) quaternary mirror is a flat, 2 mm (0.08 in) thick adaptive mirror. With up to 5,000 actuators, the surface can be readjusted one thousand times per second. The deformable mirror, which became the largest adaptive mirror ever made, consists of six component petals, control systems, and voice-coil actuators. The image distortion caused by the turbulence of the Earth's atmosphere can be corrected in real-time, as well as deformations caused by the wind upon the main telescope. The ELT's adaptive optics system will provide an improvement of about a factor of 500 in the resolution compared to the best seeing conditions achieved so far without adaptive optics.

The AdOptica consortium, partnered with INAF (Istituto Nazionale di Astrofisica) as subcontractors, are responsible for the design and manufacture of the quaternary mirror. The 6 petals were cast by Schott in Germany and polished by Safran Reosc.

As of July 2023, all six petals were completed and in the process of being integrated into their support structure. The six laser sources for the adaptive optics system, which will work hand-in-hand with the quaternary mirror, have also been completed and are in testing.

=== Quinary mirror ===
The 2.7-by-2.2-metre (8.9 by 7.2 ft) quinary mirror is a tip-tilt mirror used to refine the image using adaptive optics. The mirror will include a fast tip-tilt system for image stabilization that will compensate perturbations caused by wind, atmospheric turbulence, and the telescope itself before reaching the ELT instruments.

As of early 2024 the six component petals had been fabricated and are being brazed into a single unit.

=== Mount ===
The telescope mount, called the Main Structure, is considered an "enormous" engineering project in its own right. The main goals are to point the telescope during operation, to minimize optical path deformations (both repeatable and non-repeatable), and to guarantee safety both during normal operations and seismic events.

At the very bottom, on top of the foundation, is a vibration and seismic isolation layer. This consists of rubber isolation bearings, springs, and a locking system for larger seismic events. On top of this is the large concrete block (the pier) on which the telescope rests. This differs from most large telescopes where the isolation is between the pier and the telescope. This gives an unusually large seismic mass of 20,000 tonnes, which helps with seismic isolation, avoids mount resonances, and limits seismic acceleration imparted to instrumentation on the telescope.

On top of the concrete pier are the azimuth tracks. On top of them sits the azimuth structure, rotating around a vertical axis and supported by hydrostatic bearings. On top of that sits the altitude structure, which allows the telescope to tip from horizontal to vertical, and is also supported on hydrostatic bearings. The rotating mass is about 3,700 tonnes, and can track at ±2 degrees/second in azimuth and ±1 degrees/second in elevation.

Both azimuth and elevation angles need to be measured and controlled extremely accurately. Therefore each axis contains an optical tape readout and direct drive electrical motors. Both systems are redundant for increased availability.

Within the elevation assembly, there is a complex system of active mirror supports, designed to hold the 5 main mirrors in proper shape and alignment, despite environmental influences and changes in orientation. This system also supports the optics needed to launch, and receive, the laser guide stars that are used to correct for atmospheric distortion using the adaptive optics of mirror M4.

=== Dome ===
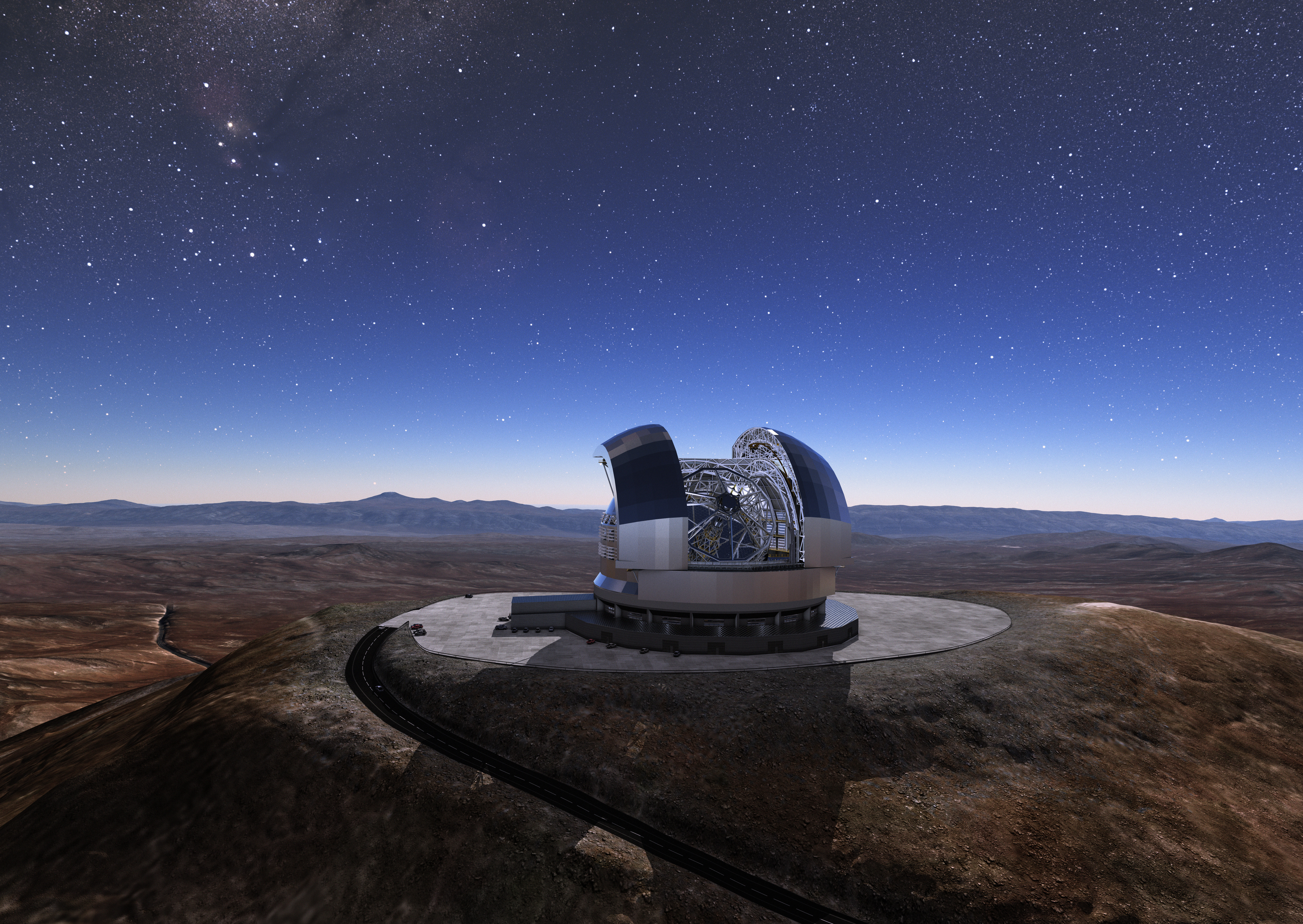
ELT concept

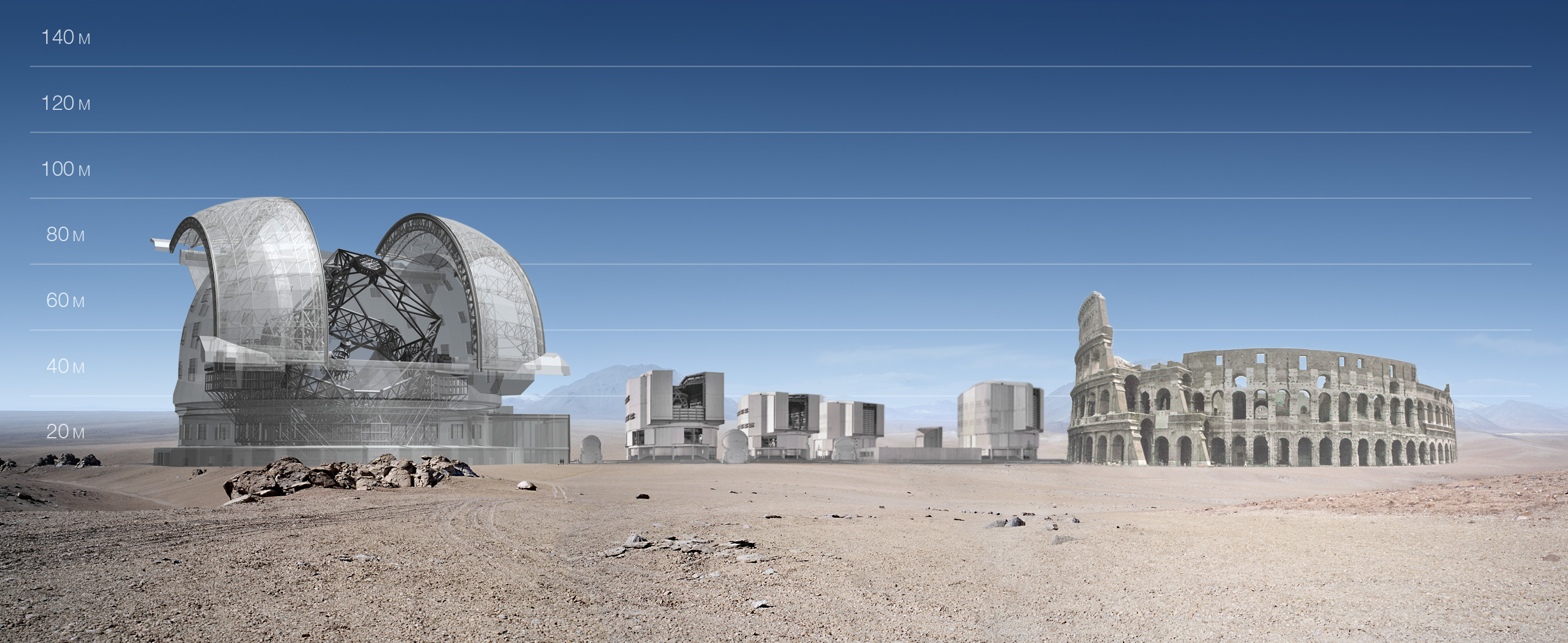
ELT compared to the VLT and the Colosseum

The ELT dome has a height of 80 metres (260 ft) from the ground and a diameter of 93 metres (305 ft), making it the largest dome ever built for a telescope. The dome has a total mass of around 6,100 tonnes (13,400,000 lb), and the telescope mounting and tube structure has a total moving mass of around 3,700 tonnes (8,200,000 lb).

For the observing slit, the dome is equipped with a single pair of large sliding doors. This pair of doors allows an opening of 41 metres (135 ft).

ESO signed a contract for its construction, together with the main structure of the telescopes, with the Italian ACe Consortium, consisting of Astaldi and Cimolai and the nominated subcontractor, Italy's EIE Group. The signature ceremony took place on 25 May 2016 at ESO's Headquarters in Garching bei München, Germany.

The dome is to provide needed protection to the telescope in inclement weather and during the day. A number of concepts for the dome were evaluated. The final design is a nearly hemispherical dome, rotating atop a concrete pier, with curved laterally-opening doors. This is a re-optimisation from the previous design, aimed at reducing cost.

One year after signing the contract, and after the laying of the first stone ceremony in May 2017, the site was handed over to ACe, signifying the beginning of the construction of the dome's main structure. As of April 2025, the dome was complete and the doors were in the process of installation.

=== Astronomical performance ===
In terms of astronomical performance the dome is required to be able to track about the 1-degree zenithal avoidance locus as well as preset to a new target within 5 minutes. This requires the dome to be able to accelerate and move at angular speeds of 2 degrees/s (the linear speed is approximately 5 km/h or 4.6 ft/s, equivalent to a fast walk). The dome is designed to allow complete freedom to the telescope so that it can position itself whether it is opened or closed. It will also permit observations from the zenith down to 20 degrees from the horizon.

=== Windscreen ===
With such a large opening, the ELT dome requires the presence of a windscreen to protect the telescope's mirrors (apart from the secondary), from direct exposure to the wind. The design of the windscreen minimises the volume required to house it. Four spherical blades, spanning the width of the opening, can be raised and lowered in front of the telescope aperture to restrict the wind.

=== Ventilation and air-conditioning ===
The dome design ensures that the dome provides sufficient ventilation for the telescope not to be limited by dome seeing. For this the dome is also equipped with louvers, whereby the windscreen is designed to allow them to fulfill their function.

Computational fluid dynamic simulations and wind tunnel work are being carried out to study the airflow in and around the dome, as well as the effectiveness of the dome and windscreen in protecting the telescope.

Besides being designed for water-tightness, air-tightness is also one of the requirements as it is critical to minimise the day-time air-conditioning load. The air-conditioning of the dome is necessary not only to thermally prepare the telescope for the forthcoming night but also in order to keep the telescope optics clean.

The air-conditioning of the telescope during the day is critical and the current specifications permit the dome to cool the telescope and internal volume by 10 °C (18 °F) over 12 hours.

== Science goals ==
The official trailer for the ELT showing the preliminary design.

The ELT will search for extrasolar planets—planets orbiting other stars. This will include not only the discovery of planets down to Earth-like masses through indirect measurements of the wobbling motion of stars perturbed by the planets that orbit them, but also the direct imaging of larger planets and possibly even the characterisation of their atmospheres. The telescope will attempt to image Earth-like exoplanets.

Furthermore, the ELT's suite of instruments will allow astronomers to probe the earliest stages of the formation of planetary systems and to detect water and organic molecules in protoplanetary discs around stars in the making. Thus, the ELT will answer fundamental questions regarding planet formation and evolution.

By probing the most distant objects the ELT will provide clues to understanding the formation of the first objects that formed: primordial stars, primordial galaxies and black holes and their relationships. Studies of extreme objects like black holes will benefit from the power of the ELT to gain more insight into time-dependent phenomena linked with the various processes at play around compact objects.

The ELT is designed for detailed study of the first galaxies. Observations of these early galaxies with the ELT will give clues that will help develop an understanding of how these objects form and evolve. In addition, the ELT will be a useful tool for making an inventory of the changing content of the various elements in the Universe with time, and to understand star formation history in galaxies.

One of the goals of the ELT is the possibility of making a direct measurement of the acceleration of the universe's expansion. Such a measurement would have an impact on our understanding of the universe. The ELT will also search for possible variations in the fundamental physical constants with time. An unambiguous detection of such variations would have consequences for our comprehension of the general laws of physics.

== Instrumentation ==
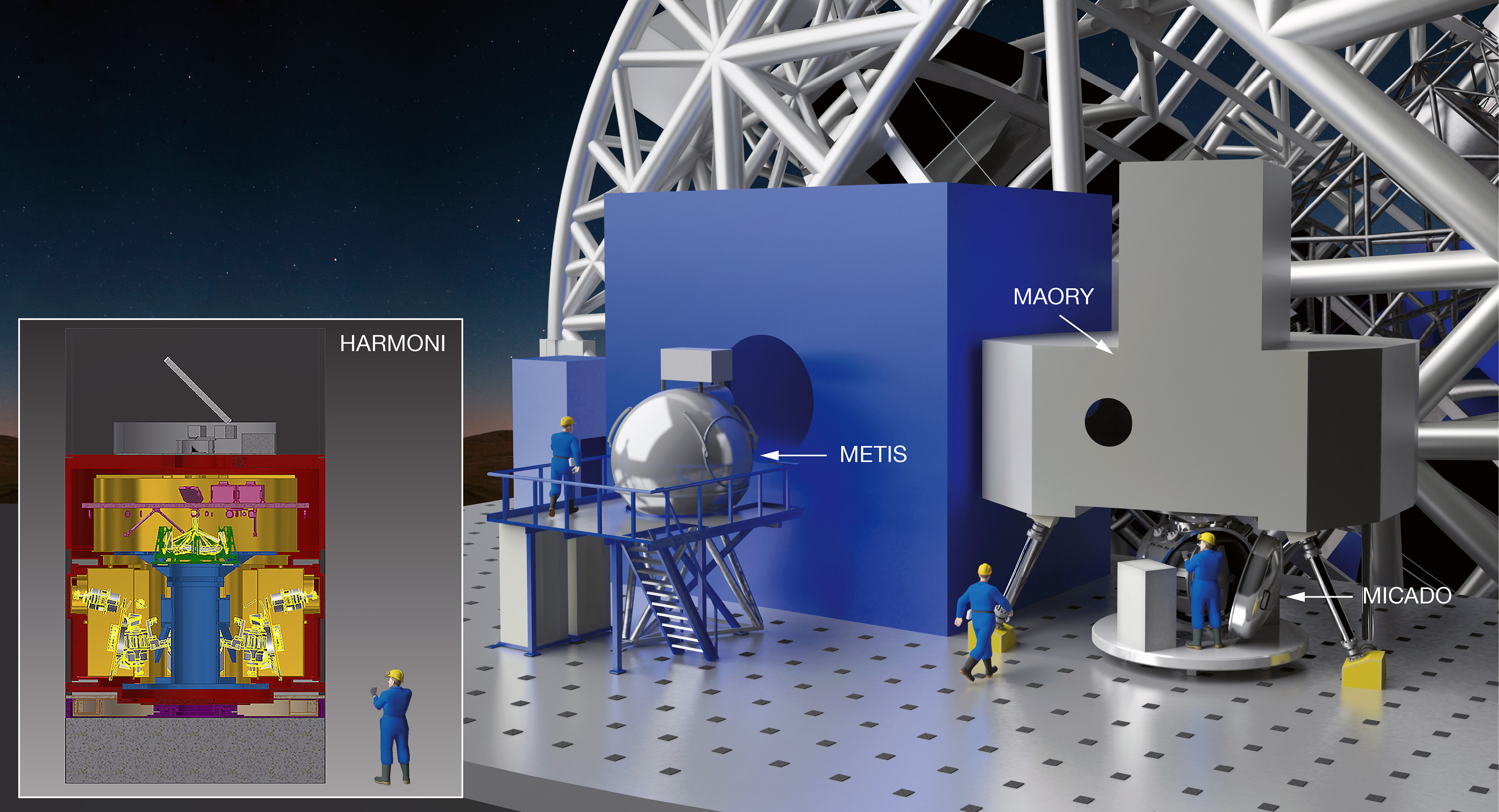
The first ELT instruments

The telescope will have several scientific instruments and will be able to switch from one instrument to another within minutes. The telescope and dome will also be able to change positions on the sky and start a new session of observation in a short time.

Four of its instruments, the first generation, will be available at or shortly after first light, while two others will begin operations later. Throughout its operation other instruments can be installed.

The first generation includes four instruments: MICADO, HARMONI and METIS, along with the adaptive optics system MORFEO.

- HARMONI: The High Angular Resolution Monolithic Optical and Near-infrared Integral field spectrograph (HARMONI) will function as the telescope's workhorse instrument for spectroscopy.
- METIS: The Mid-infrared ELT Imager and Spectrograph (METIS) will be a mid-infrared imager and spectrograph.
- MICADO: The Multi-AO (adaptive optics) Imaging Camera for Deep Observations (MICADO) will be the first dedicated imaging camera for the ELT and will work with the Multiconjugate adaptive Optics Relay For ELT Observations, (MORFEO, formerly MAORY).

The second generation of instruments consists of MOSAIC and ANDES.

- MOSAIC: A proposed multi-object spectrograph which will allow astronomers to trace the growth of galaxies and the distribution of matter from shortly after the Big Bang to the present day.
- ANDES (formerly HIRES): The ArmazoNes high Dispersion Echelle Spectrograph will be used to search for indications of life on Earth-like exoplanets, find the first-born stars of the universe, test for possible variations of the fundamental constants of physics, and measure the acceleration of the Universe's expansion.

== Comparison ==
One of the largest optical telescopes operating today is the Gran Telescopio Canarias, with a 10.4-metre (34 ft) aperture and a light-collecting area of 74 m^{2} (800 ft^{2}). Other planned extremely large telescopes include the Giant Magellan Telescope with a mirror diameter of 25 m (82 ft) and area of 368 m^{2} (3,960 ft^{2}), and the Thirty Meter Telescope with a diameter of 30 m (98 ft), and an area of 655 m^{2} (7,050 ft^{2}). Both of these are also targeting the 2030s for completion. These two other telescopes roughly belong to the same next generation of optical ground-based telescopes. Each design is much larger than previous telescopes.

The size of the ELT has been reduced from its original design. Even with that reduction, the ELT is significantly larger than both other planned extremely large telescopes. It has the aim of observing the universe in greater detail than the Hubble Space Telescope by taking images 15 times sharper, although it is designed to be complementary to space telescopes, which typically have very limited observing time available. The ELT's 4.2-metre secondary mirror is the same size as the primary mirror on the William Herschel Telescope, the second largest optical telescope in Europe.

The ELT under ideal conditions has an angular resolution of 0.005 arcsecond which corresponds to separating two light sources 1 AU apart from 200 pc (650 ly) distance, or two light sources 30 cm (12 in) apart from roughly 12,000 km (7,500 mi) distance. At 0.03 arcseconds, the contrast is expected to be 10^{8}, sufficient to search for exoplanets. The unaided human eye has an angular resolution of 1 arcminute which corresponds to separating two light sources 30 cm apart from 1 km distance.

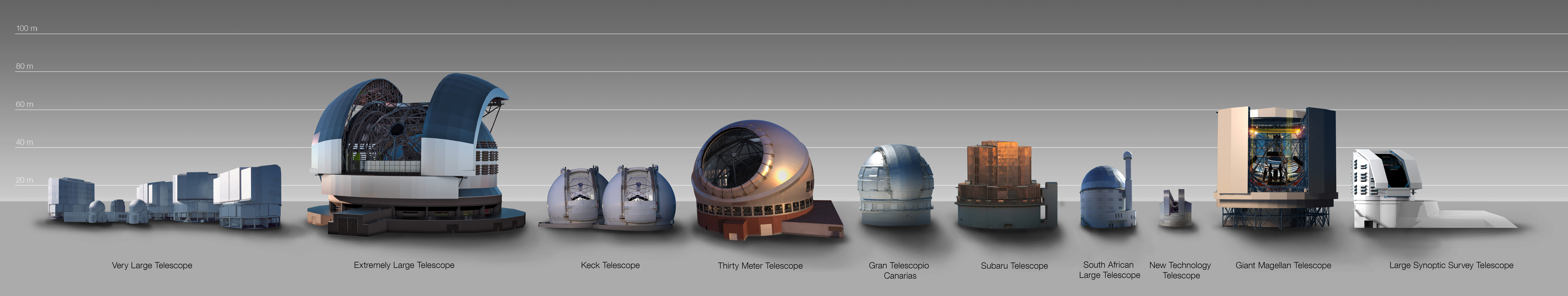
Size comparison between the ELT and other telescope domes

Comparison of nominal sizes of apertures of the Extremely Large Telescope and some notable optical telescopes

Name	Aperture diameter (m)	Collecting area (m²)	First light	Ref
Extremely Large Telescope (ELT)	39	978	2029	
Thirty Meter Telescope (TMT)	30.0	655	?	
Giant Magellan Telescope (GMT)	25.4	368	2030s	
Large Binocular Telescope (LBT)	2 x 8.4 (22.8)	111	2005	
Southern African Large Telescope (SALT)	11.1 × 9.8	79	2005	
Hobby–Eberly Telescope (HET)	11.1 × 9.8	79	1996	
Gran Telescopio Canarias (GTC)	10.4	74	2007	
Keck Telescopes	10.0	76	1990, 1996	
Very Large Telescope (VLT)	8.2	50 (×4)	1998–2000	
Notes: Future first-light dates are provisional and likely to change.

== See also ==
- Lists of telescopes
- List of largest optical reflecting telescopes
- List of optical telescopes
- Large Binocular Telescope
- European Solar Telescope
- Gran Telescopio Canarias
- Overwhelmingly Large Telescope
- List of astronomical observatories
- List of highest astronomical observatories
- Other observatories in Chile:
  - Llano de Chajnantor Observatory
    - Atacama Large Millimeter Array
  - Paranal Observatory
    - Very Large Telescope
  - Cerro Armazones Observatory
  - La Silla Observatory
  - Cerro Tololo Inter-American Observatory
