= Astronet =

European astronomy consortium

Astronet is a consortium of European funding agencies and research organizations established to coordinate long-term strategic planning for the advancement of astronomy in Europe. The consortium was launched in 2005 to align infrastructure and policy development across Europe through a shared science vision and roadmap.

Initially funded as a European Research Area Network (ERA-NET) supported by the European Commission, Astronet became a self-sustaining collaboration after 2015. It includes major organisations such as the European Space Agency (ESA), the European Southern Observatory (ESO), and the Square Kilometre Array Observatory (SKAO). Its first Science Vision was published in 2007. This was followed by an Infrastructure Roadmap in 2008. These documents helped inform major projects like the Extremely Large Telescope (ELT) and the Square Kilometre Array (SKA). A more recent roadmap, published in 2022, sets strategic goals for European astronomy through 2035, highlighting projects such as the Einstein Telescope and the European Solar Telescope.

== History ==
In 2005, European funding agencies, along with ESA and ESO, launched the Astronet programme to coordinate astronomy development across Europe. Funded by an ERA-NET contract from the European Commission, its goal was to create a 20-year strategic plan, modeled on the U.S. decadal surveys, through a two-step process: a Science Vision followed by an Infrastructure Roadmap.

In 2007, Science magazine reported on the launch of Astronet’s Science Vision and Roadmap, marking the first coordinated effort by European funding agencies to unify long-term astronomy planning. The initiative outlined major research questions and proposed infrastructure for the following two decades.

A 2009 article in Science highlighted how the roadmap aimed to improve coordination of astronomy funding across Europe. While the effort was credited with unifying the field, some senior scientists expressed concern that long-term planning over 20 years could risk limiting innovation for early-career researchers.

In 2011, a policy forum described the roadmap as part of a broader European strategy to set priorities in ground- and space-based astronomy through 2025. Missions such as the Laser Interferometer Space Antenna (LISA) and the International X-ray Observatory (IXO) were listed among the top objectives.

In 2013, a paper published by the Royal Society noted that reports by the European Union’s Astronet group and the U.S. National Research Council had recognized the importance of the temporal domain for understanding the evolution of stars and galaxies.

In 2021, Nature described Astronet's roadmap process as a pan-European counterpart to the U.S. decadal survey.

In 2023, the Royal Astronomical Society welcomed Astronet’s 2022–2035 roadmap as “an ambitious and exciting programme” for future astronomy research. The document identifies science goals including the nature of dark matter and dark energy, alongside priorities in computing, sustainability, and public engagement.

== Roadmap ==
In November 2008, Astronet released its first Infrastructure Roadmap, setting priorities for European astronomy over the next 20 years. Developed with input from 28 countries, the European Space Agency (ESA), and the European Southern Observatory (ESO), the roadmap was modeled after the United States National Research Council’s decadal surveys. It identified the European Extremely Large Telescope (ELT) and the Square Kilometre Array (SKA) as top priorities, and supported ESA missions such as the Laser Interferometer Space Antenna (LISA) and Gaia.

A subsequent roadmap, published in 2023, outlines strategic goals for the period 2022–2035. It sets out a series of priorities for European astronomy, including recommendations for a wide-field spectroscopic telescope, support for the Einstein Telescope (a gravitational-wave observatory in development), and the European Solar Telescope. Continued support was also recommended for previously endorsed facilities such as the ELT and the SKA. The roadmap additionally includes recommendations to prioritize sustainability and diversity in funding decisions.

== Participants ==
Participating organizations in Astronet include the Netherlands Organisation for Scientific Research (NWO), the Institut national des sciences de l’Univers CNRS (France), the Science and Technology Facilities Council (United Kingdom), the European Southern Observatory (ESO), the Istituto Nazionale di Astrofisica (INAF, Italy), and the Research Foundation Flanders (FWO). Observer institutions include the European Space Agency (ESA), Portugal Space, the Square Kilometre Array Observatory (SKAO), and the European Astronomical Society (EAS).

== See also ==
- European Extremely Large Telescope
- European Northern Observatory
- Cherenkov Telescope Array
