= Extremely large telescope =

20-100-m-aperture astronomical observatory

Comparison of nominal sizes of apertures of the above extremely large telescopes and some notable optical telescopes

An extremely large telescope (ELT) is an astronomical observatory featuring an optical telescope with an aperture for its primary mirror from 20 metres up to 100 metres across, when discussing reflecting telescopes of optical wavelengths including ultraviolet (UV), visible, and near infrared wavelengths. Among many planned capabilities, extremely large telescopes are planned to increase the chance of finding Earth-like planets around other stars. Telescopes for radio wavelengths can be much bigger physically, such as the 300 metres (330 yards) aperture fixed focus radio telescope of the Arecibo Observatory (now defunct). Freely steerable radio telescopes with diameters up to 100 metres (110 yards) have been in operation since the 1970s.

These telescopes have a number of features in common, in particular the use of a segmented primary mirror (similar to the existing Keck telescopes), and the use of high-order adaptive optics systems.

Despite the size of extremely large telescope designs, they can have smaller apertures than the aperture synthesis on many large optical interferometers. However, they may collect much more light, along with other advantages.

== List of telescopes ==
#	Image	Name	Aperture (m)	Area (m^{2})	Primary mirror	Altitude (m)	First light	Notes	Refs
1		Extremely Large Telescope (ELT)	39.5	978	798 × 1.45 m hexagonal f/1	3060	2029	Under construction at Cerro Armazones Obs., Chile	
2		Thirty Meter Telescope (TMT)	30.0	655	492 × 1.45 m hexagonal f/1	4050	Unknown	Construction approved at Mauna Kea Obs. in Hawaii, USA, halted as of September 2019 due to protests	
3		Giant Magellan Telescope (GMT)	24.5	368	7 × 8.4 m circular f/0.71	2516	2030s	Under construction at Las Campanas Obs., Chile	
4		Large Binocular Telescope (LBT)	11.8 (equiv. area); 22.8 (equiv. detail limit)	111	2 × 8.4 m circular	3221	2008	Largest non-segmented mirrors. Located on Mount Graham, Arizona, USA	
Note: Aperture of LBT: the baseline is obtained via aperture synthesis.

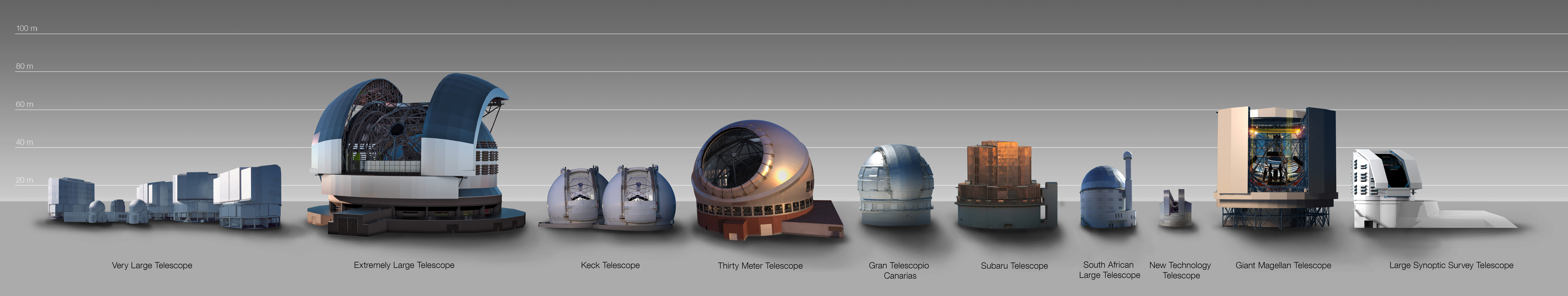
The domes of the ELT, the TMT and the GMT compared to other well-known telescopes

== Budget ==
Possible budget figures, which are estimates and can vary over time. For construction costs, it is recommended to estimate the cost of a giant telescope with the relation cost ∝ D^{2.7}.

Name	Cost (est. USD)	Alternate
Extremely Large Telescope (ELT)	$1590 million	€1300 million
Thirty Meter Telescope (TMT)	$1400 million	$3600 million
Giant Magellan Telescope (GMT)	$1000 million	$2540 million
Large Binocular Telescope (LBT)	$120 million	

== Projects ==
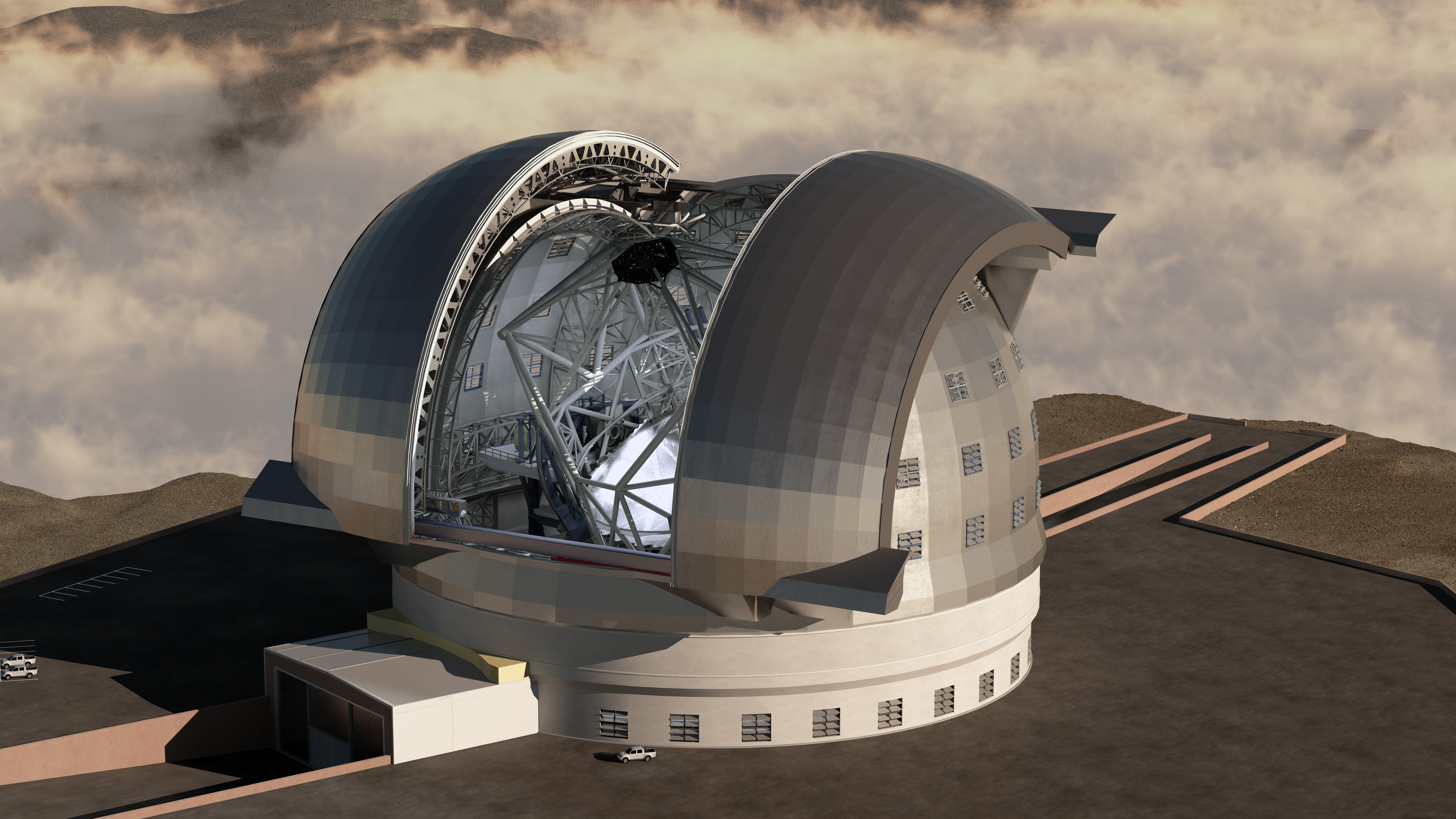
Extremely Large Telescope

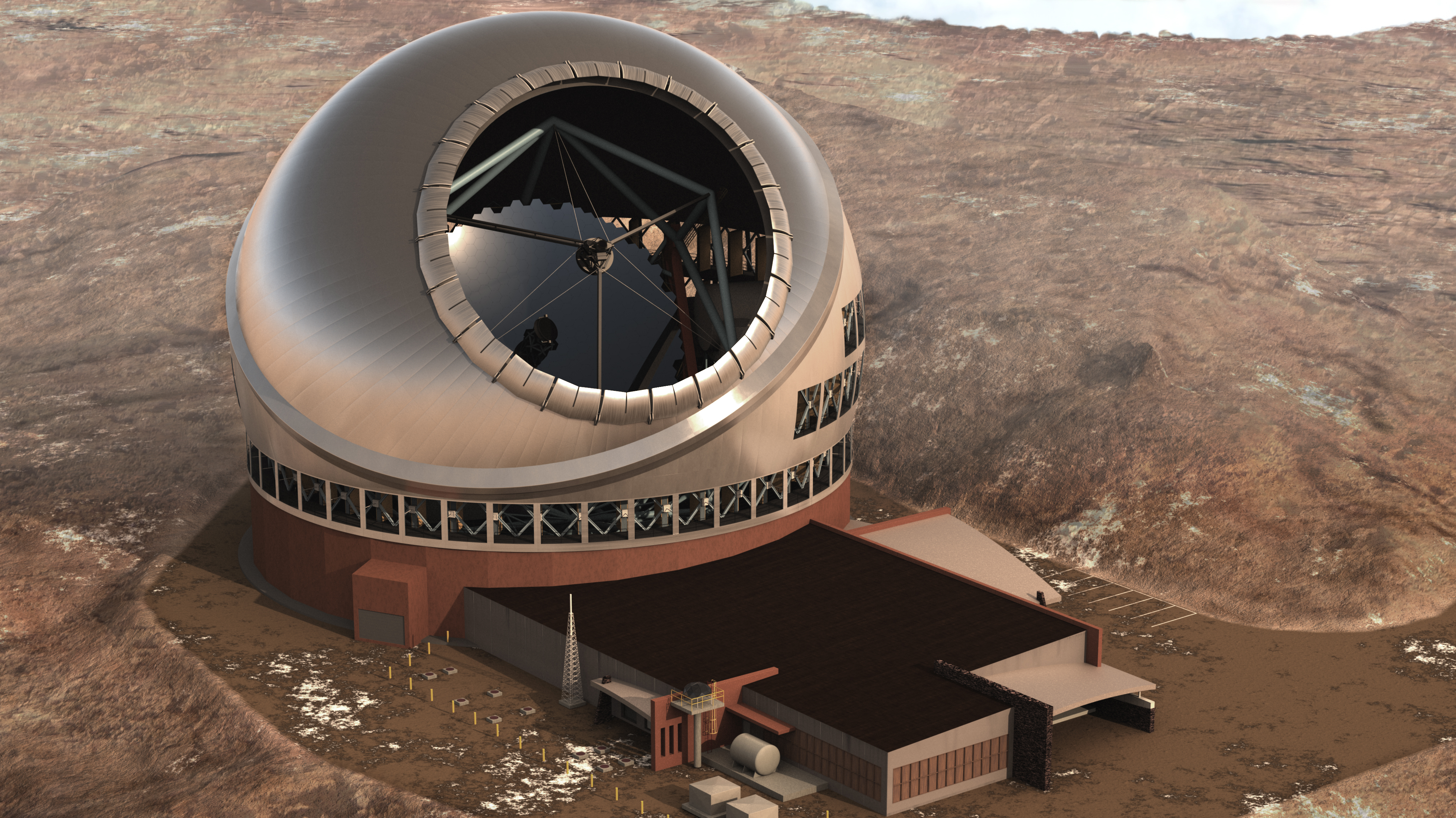
Thirty Meter Telescope

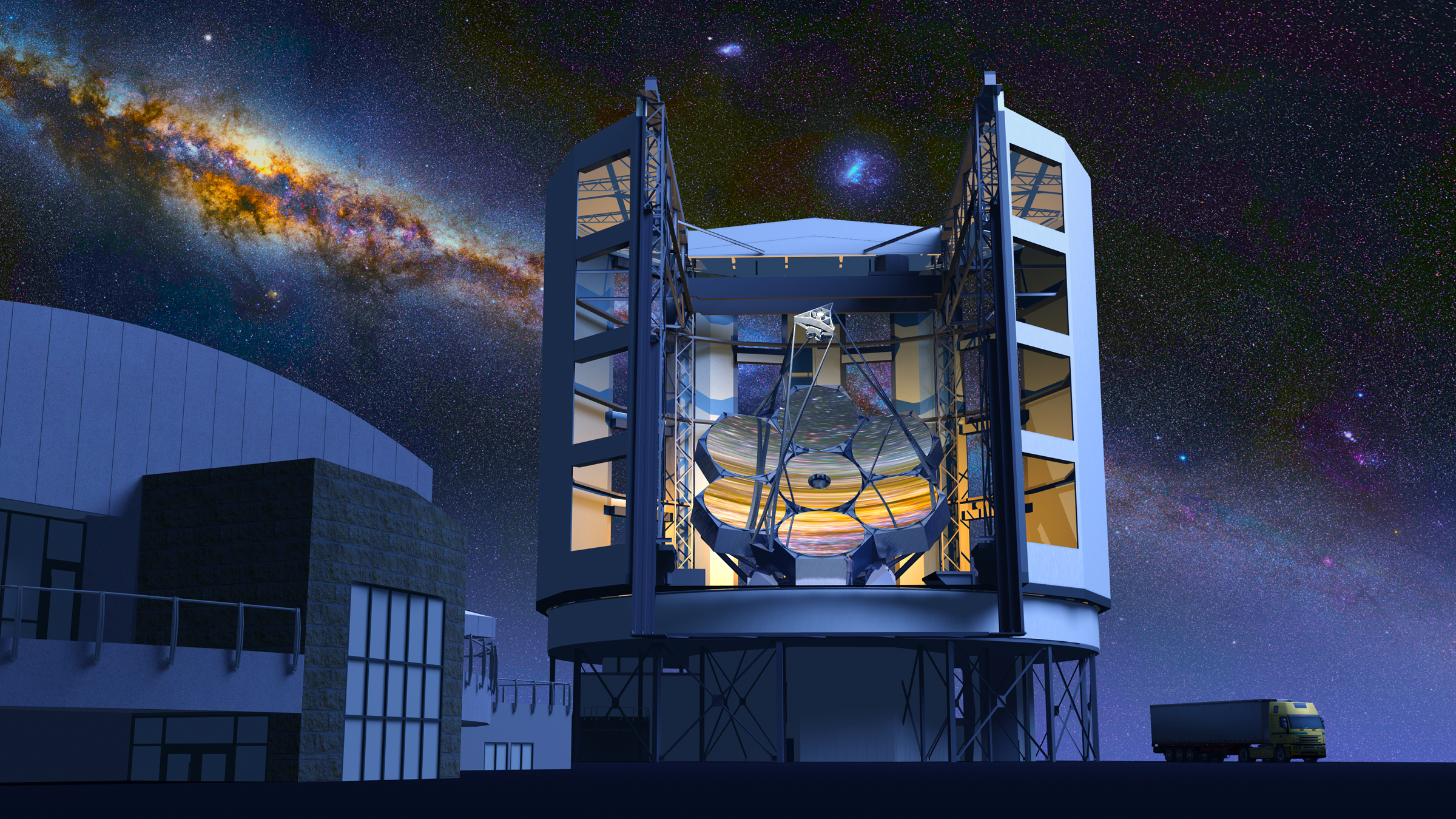
Giant Magellan Telescope

There were several telescopes in various stages in the 1990s and early 2000s, and some developed into construction projects.

Under construction

- ELT: Extremely Large Telescope
- GMT: Giant Magellan Telescope

Funded construction

- TMT: Thirty Meter Telescope

Projects

Some of these projects have been cancelled, or merged into ongoing extremely large telescopes.

- GSMT: Giant Segmented Mirror Telescope, merged into TMT
- OWL: Overwhelmingly Large Telescope, passed over in favor of ELT
- VLOT: Very Large Optical Telescope, merged into TMT
- LAT: Large Atacama Telescope
- EURO50: European 50-metre Telescope, merged into ELT
- LPT: Large Petal Telescope
- Magellan 20: merged into GMT
- HDRT: High Dynamic Range Telescope
- JELT: Japanese ELT Project; Japan joined the TMT project in 2008
- CELT: California Extremely Large Telescope, became/merged into TMT
- MAXAT: Maximum Aperture Telescope

== See also ==
- List of largest optical reflecting telescopes
- List of telescope types
