= Segmented mirror =

Array of smaller mirrors designed to act as one large curved mirror

Size comparison of primary mirrors. Segmented mirrors are typically hexagonal and arranged in a honeycomb pattern.

A segmented mirror is an array of smaller mirrors designed to act as segments of a single large curved mirror. The segments can be either spherical or asymmetric (if they are part of a larger parabolic reflector). They are used as objectives for large reflecting telescopes. To function, all the mirror segments have to be polished to a precise shape and actively aligned by a computer-controlled active optics system using actuators built into the mirror support cell.

The concept was pioneered by Guido Horn D'Arturo, who built the first working segmented mirror in 1952, after twenty years of research; It was later independently rediscovered and further developed under the leadership of Dr. Jerry Nelson at the Lawrence Berkeley National Laboratory and University of California during the 1980s, and since then all the necessary technologies have spread worldwide to the point that essentially all future large optical telescopes plan to use segmented mirrors.

== Application ==
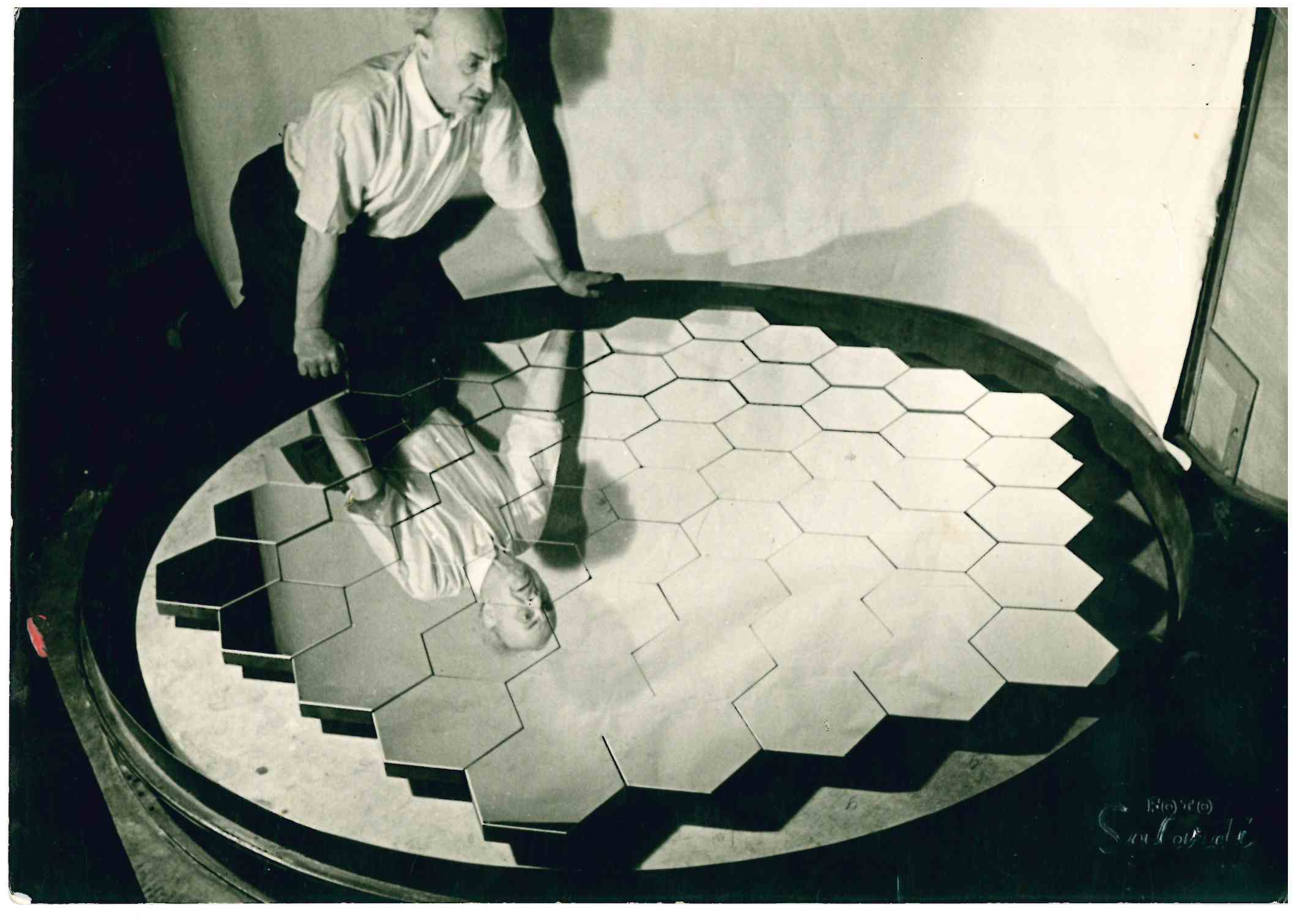
Early segmented mirror, built out of 61 hexagonal segments in 1952.

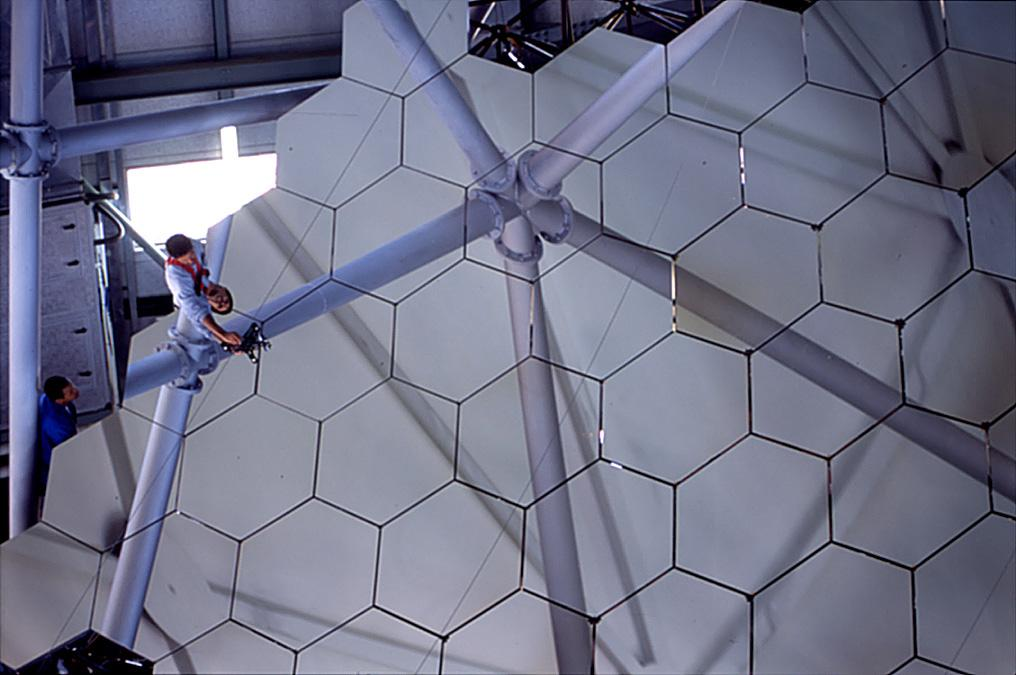
SALT's segmented mirror

There is a technological limit for primary mirrors made of a single rigid piece of glass. Such non-segmented, or monolithic mirrors can not be constructed larger than about eight meters in diameter. The largest monolithic mirrors in use are currently the two primary mirrors of the Large Binocular Telescope, each with a diameter of 8.4 meters. The use of segmented mirrors is therefore a key component for large-aperture telescopes. Using a monolithic mirror much larger than 5 meters is prohibitively expensive due to the cost of both the mirror, and the massive structure needed to support it. A mirror beyond that size would also sag slightly under its own weight as the telescope was rotated to different positions, changing the precision shape of the surface. Segments are also easier to fabricate, transport, install, and maintain over very large monolithic mirrors.

Segmented mirrors do have the drawback that each segment may require some precise asymmetrical shape, and rely on a complicated computer-controlled mounting system. All of the segments also cause diffraction effects in the final image.

Another application for segmented mirrors can be found in the augmented reality sector to minimize the size of the optical components. A partial reflective segmented mirror array is used by tooz to out-couple the light from their light guides, which is used as an optical smartglass element.

== Telescopes using segmented mirrors ==
Some of the largest optical telescopes in the world use segmented primary mirrors. These include, but are not limited to the following telescopes:

=== Keck Telescopes ===
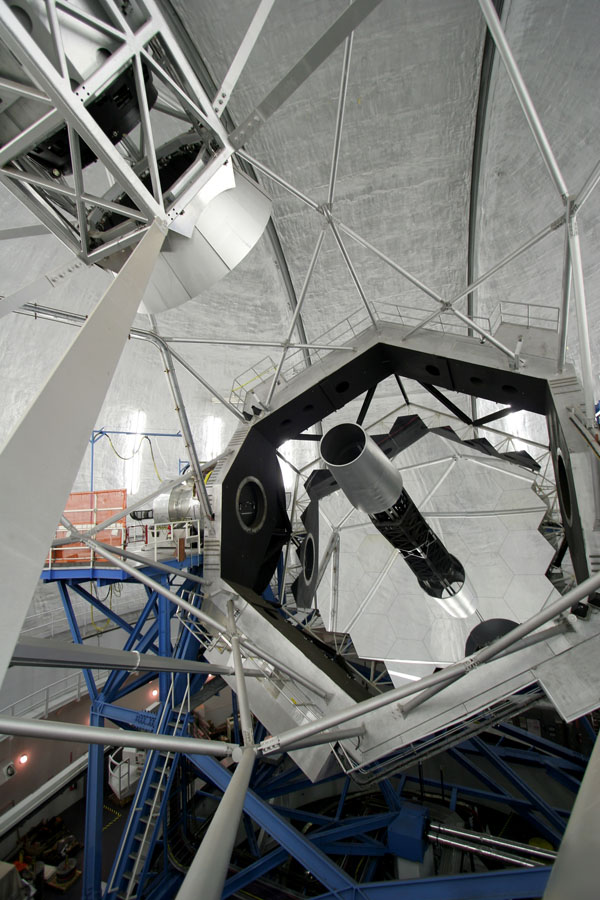
The Keck II telescope showing the segmented primary mirror

The twin Keck Telescopes are the most prominent of the Mauna Kea Observatories at an elevation of 4,145 meters (13,600 ft) near the summit of Mauna Kea in Hawaii, United States. Both telescopes feature 10 m (33 ft) primary mirrors.

=== Hobby-Eberly Telescope ===
The Hobby-Eberly Telescope (HET) is a 9.2-meter (30-foot) telescope located at the McDonald Observatory, West Texas at an altitude of 2,026 m (6,647 ft). Its primary mirror is constructed from 91 hexagonal segments. The telescope's main mirror is fixed at a 55 degree angle and can rotate around its base. A target is tracked by moving the instruments at the focus of the telescope; this allows access to about 70–81% of the sky at its location and a single target can be tracked for up to two hours.

=== Southern African Large Telescope ===
The Southern African Large Telescope (SALT) is a 10-meter telescope dedicated on spectroscopy for most of its observing time. It shares similarities with the Hobby-Eberly Telescope and also consists of 91 hexagonal mirror segments, each 1 meter across, resulting in a total hexagonal mirror of 11.1 m by 9.8 m. It is located close to the town of Sutherland in the semi-desert region of the Karoo, South Africa. It is a facility of the South African Astronomical Observatory, the national optical observatory of South Africa.

=== Gran Telescopio Canarias ===
Also known as the GranTeCan, the Canaries Great Telescope uses a total of 36 segmented mirrors. With a primary mirror of 10.4 m (34 ft), it is currently the world's largest optical telescope, located at the Roque de los Muchachos Observatory on the island of La Palma, in the Canary Islands in Spain.

=== LAMOST ===
The Large Sky Area Multi-Object Fibre Spectroscopic Telescope is a survey telescope located in the Hebei Province of China. It consists of two rectangular mirrors, made up of 24 and 37 segments, respectively. Each hexagonal segment is 1.1 metre in size.

=== James Webb Space Telescope ===
The 18 mirror segments of the James Webb Space Telescope were mostly fabricated in 2011. The space telescope was launched by an Ariane 5 from Guiana Space Centre on December 25, 2021.

Mirror segments of the James Webb Space Telescope

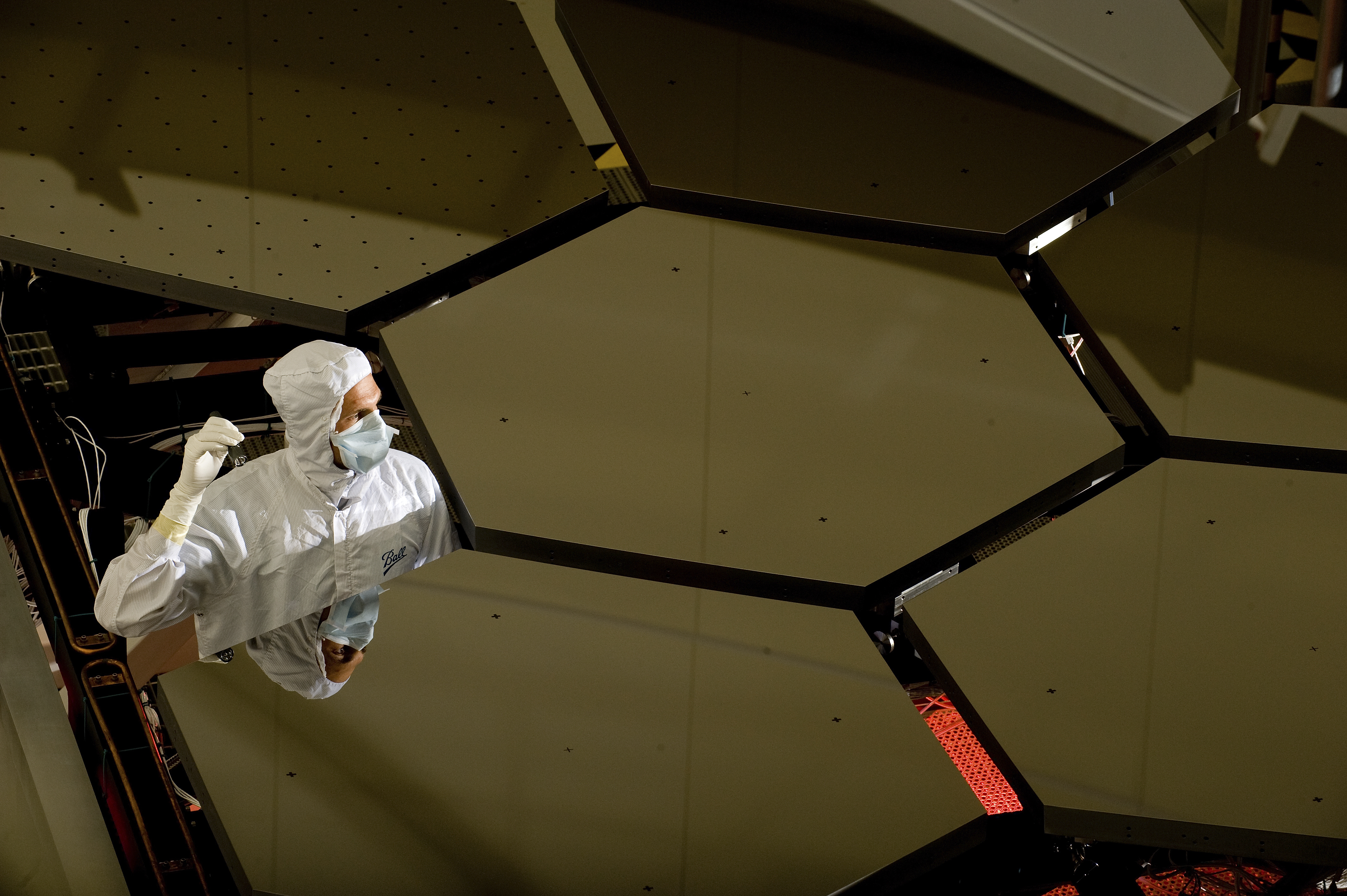
Mirror segments made of beryllium

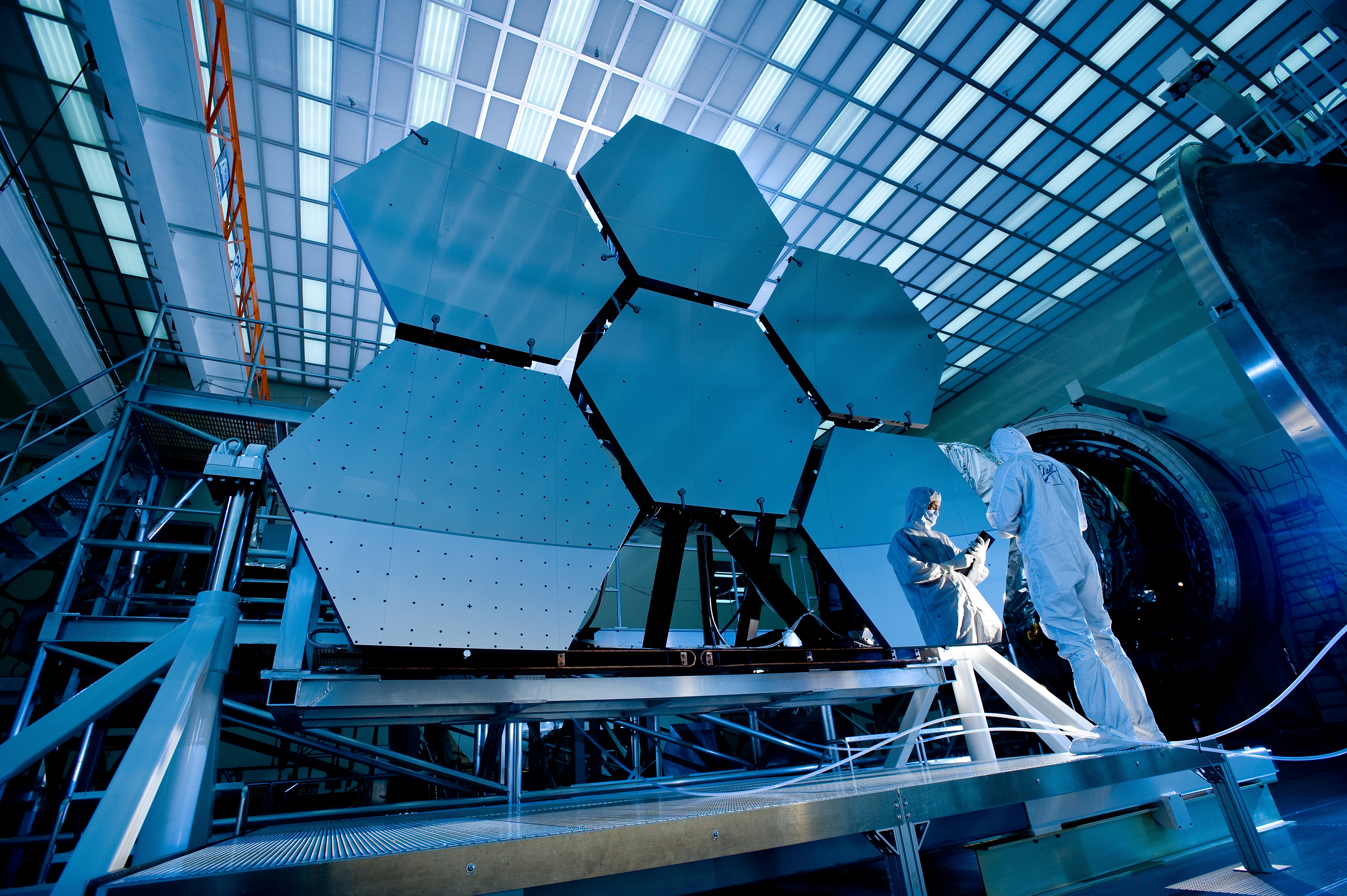
Cryogenic tests at the MSFC

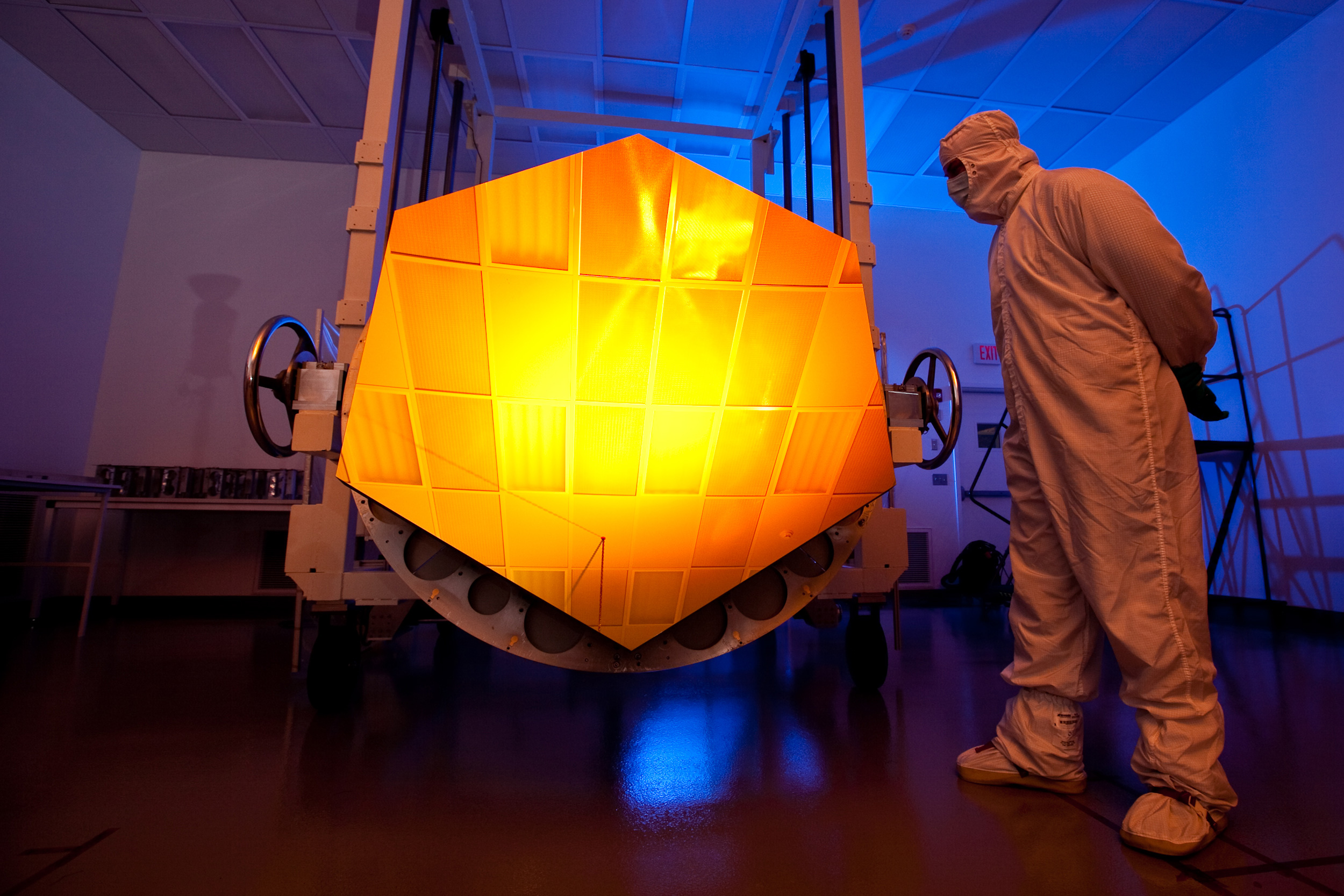
Segment after being coated with gold

== Next-generation telescopes ==
Three extremely large telescopes will be the next generation of segmented-mirror telescopes and are planned to be commissioned in the 2020s. The Giant Magellan Telescope uses seven large segments and is either grouped with segmented mirrors telescopes or its own category. The Thirty Meter Telescope is to be built at the Mauna Kea Observatories in Hawaii, though construction is on hold. This will use 492 hexagonal segments. The Extremely Large Telescope will be the largest of all three, using a total of 798 segments for its primary mirror. Its first light is expected for 2028.

Conceptual images of ELTs

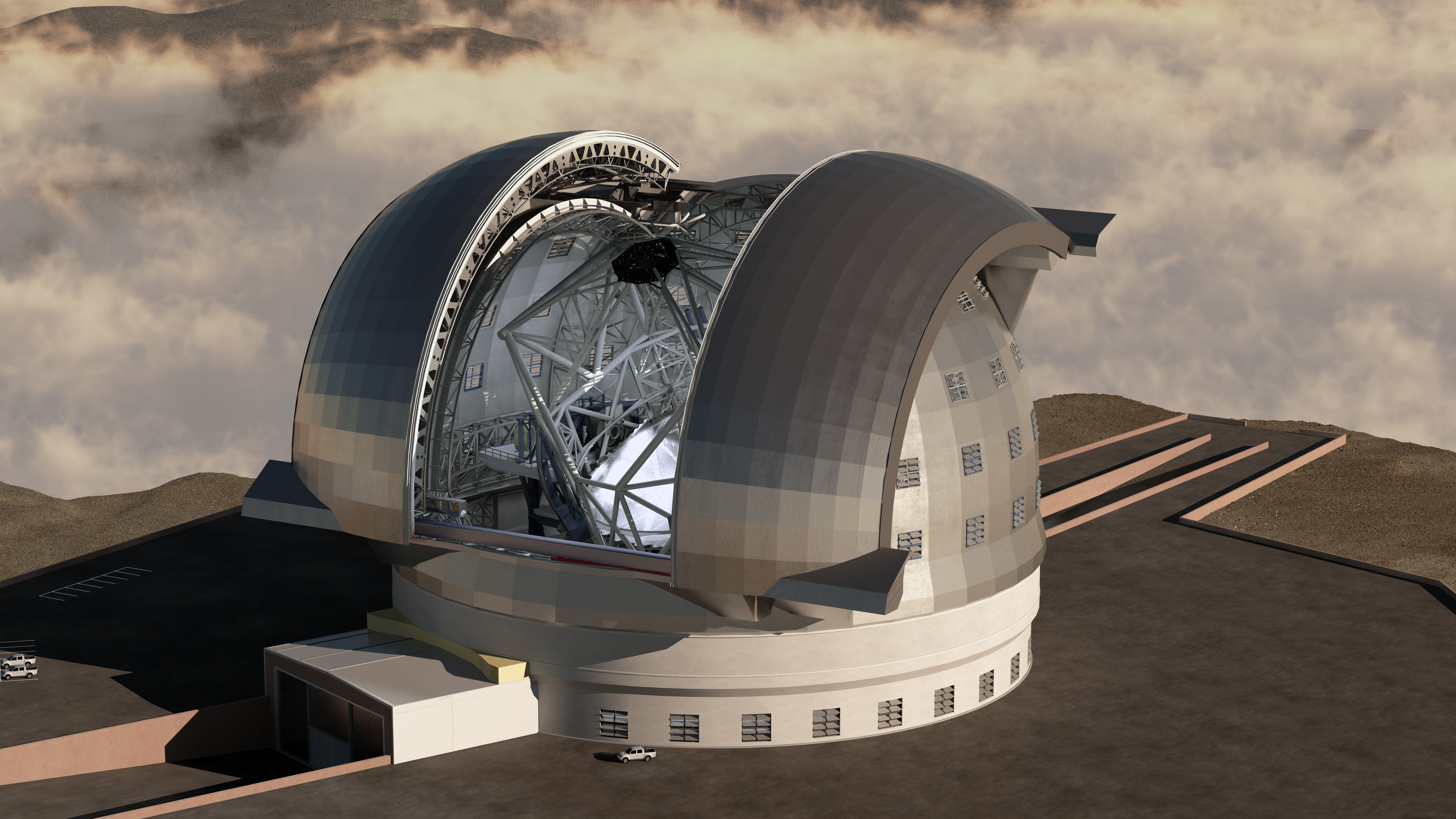
Extremely Large Telescope

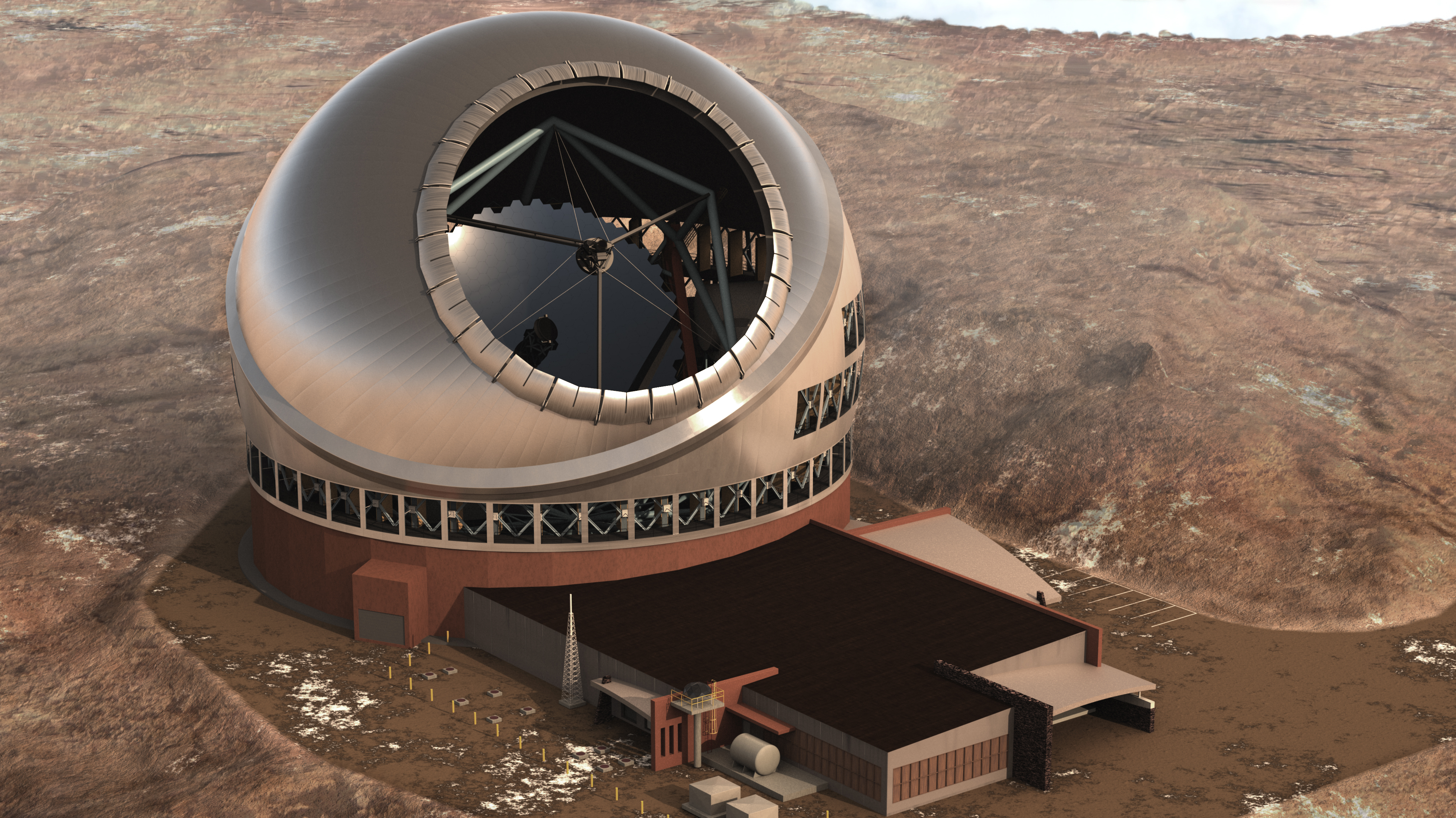
Thirty Meter Telescope

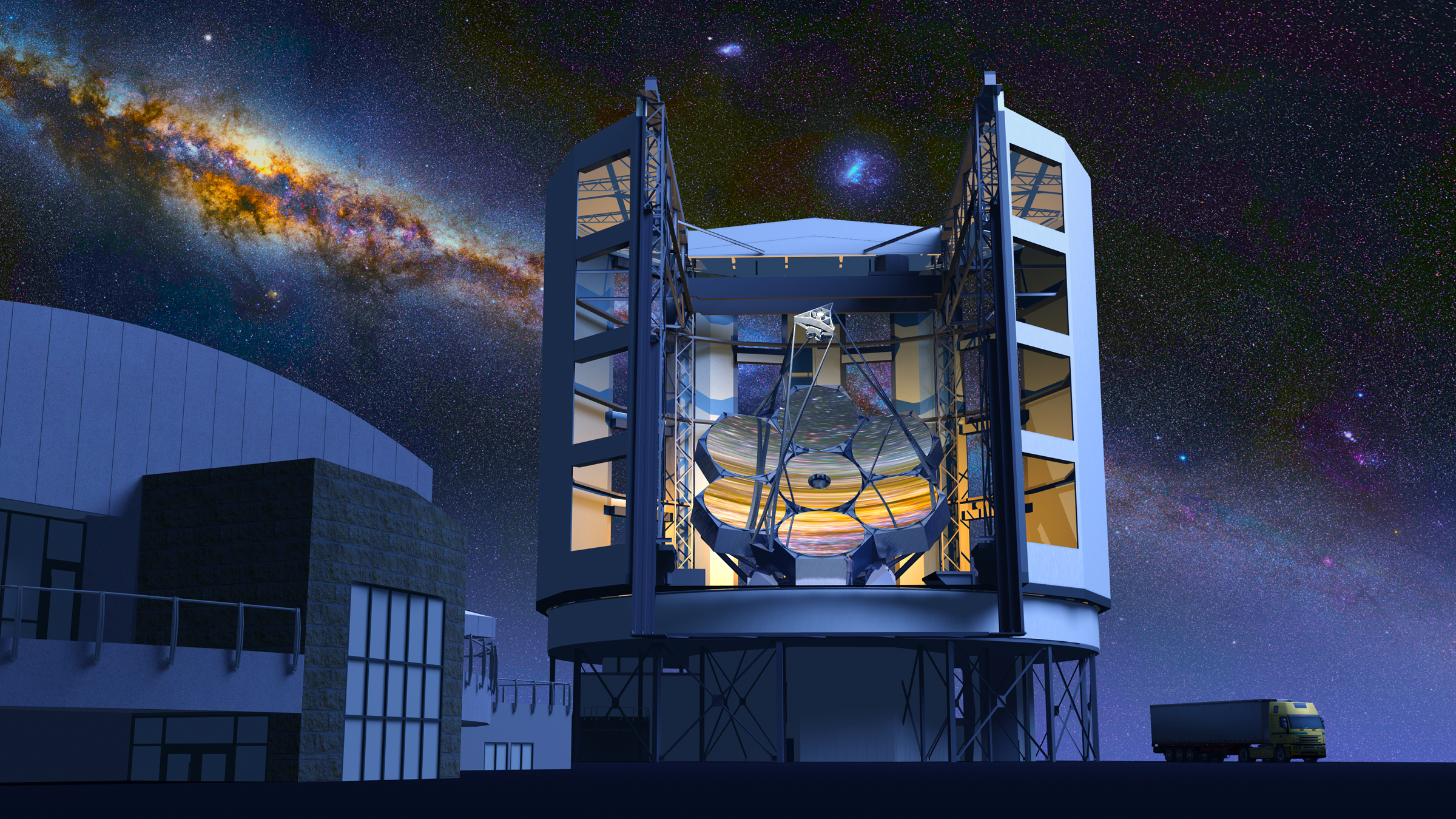
Giant Magellan Telescope

== Diffraction spikes ==
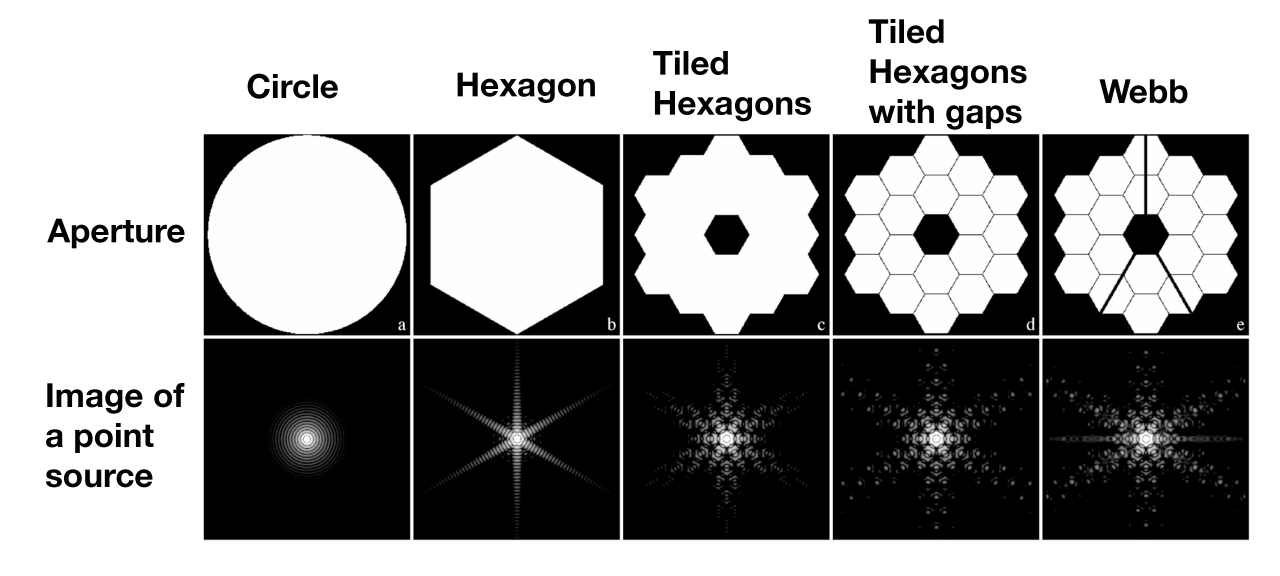
Diffraction spikes caused in JWST due to its hexagonal aperture and three support struts

Edges of the JWST primary mirror segments and spider colour-coded with their corresponding diffraction spikes

Images from telescopes with segmented mirrors also exhibit diffraction spikes due to diffraction from the mirrors' edges. As before, two spikes are perpendicular to each edge orientation, resulting in six spikes (plus two fainter ones due to the spider supporting the secondary mirror) in photographs taken by the James Webb Space Telescope.

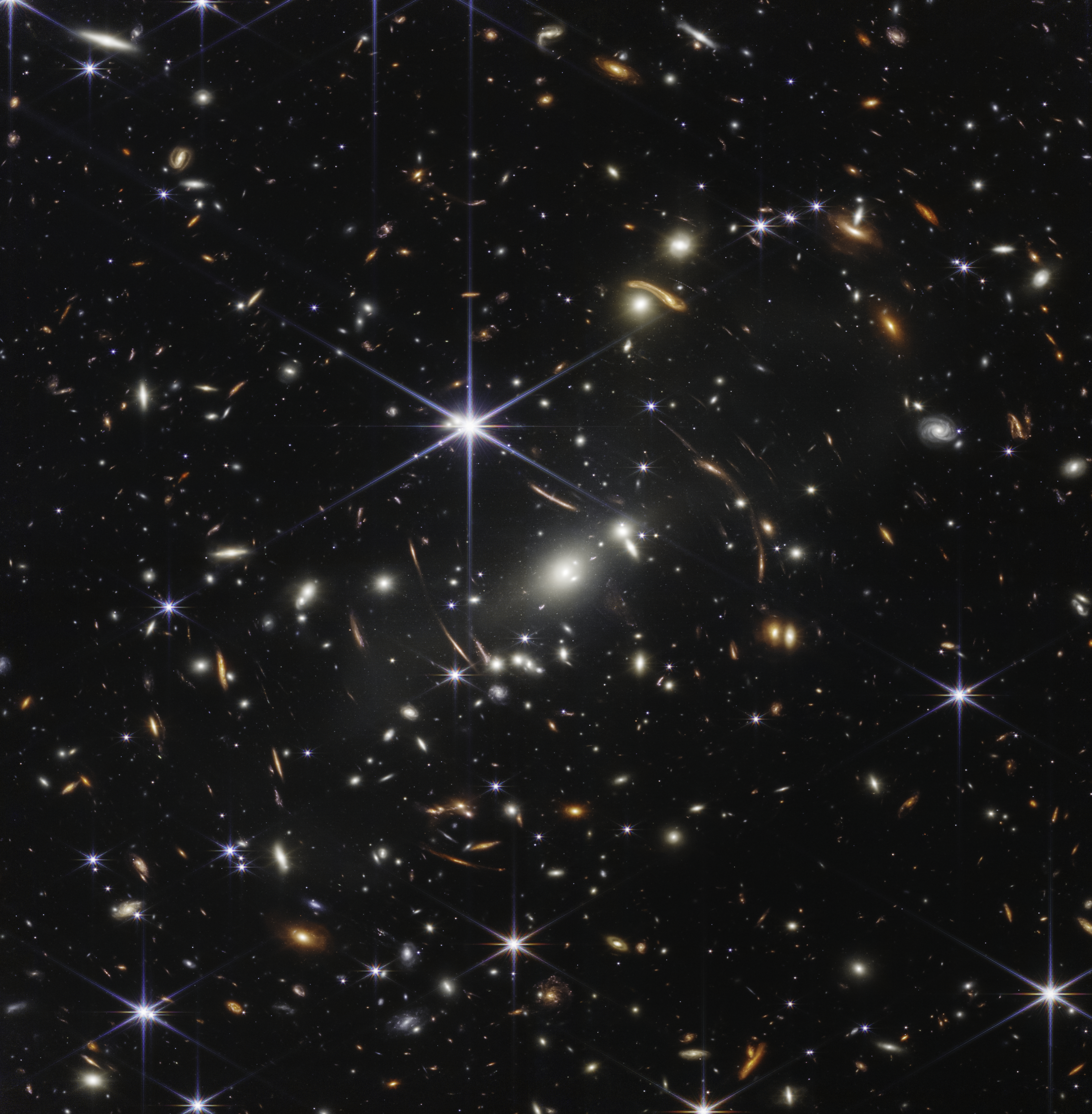
The first JWST deep field with diffraction spikes

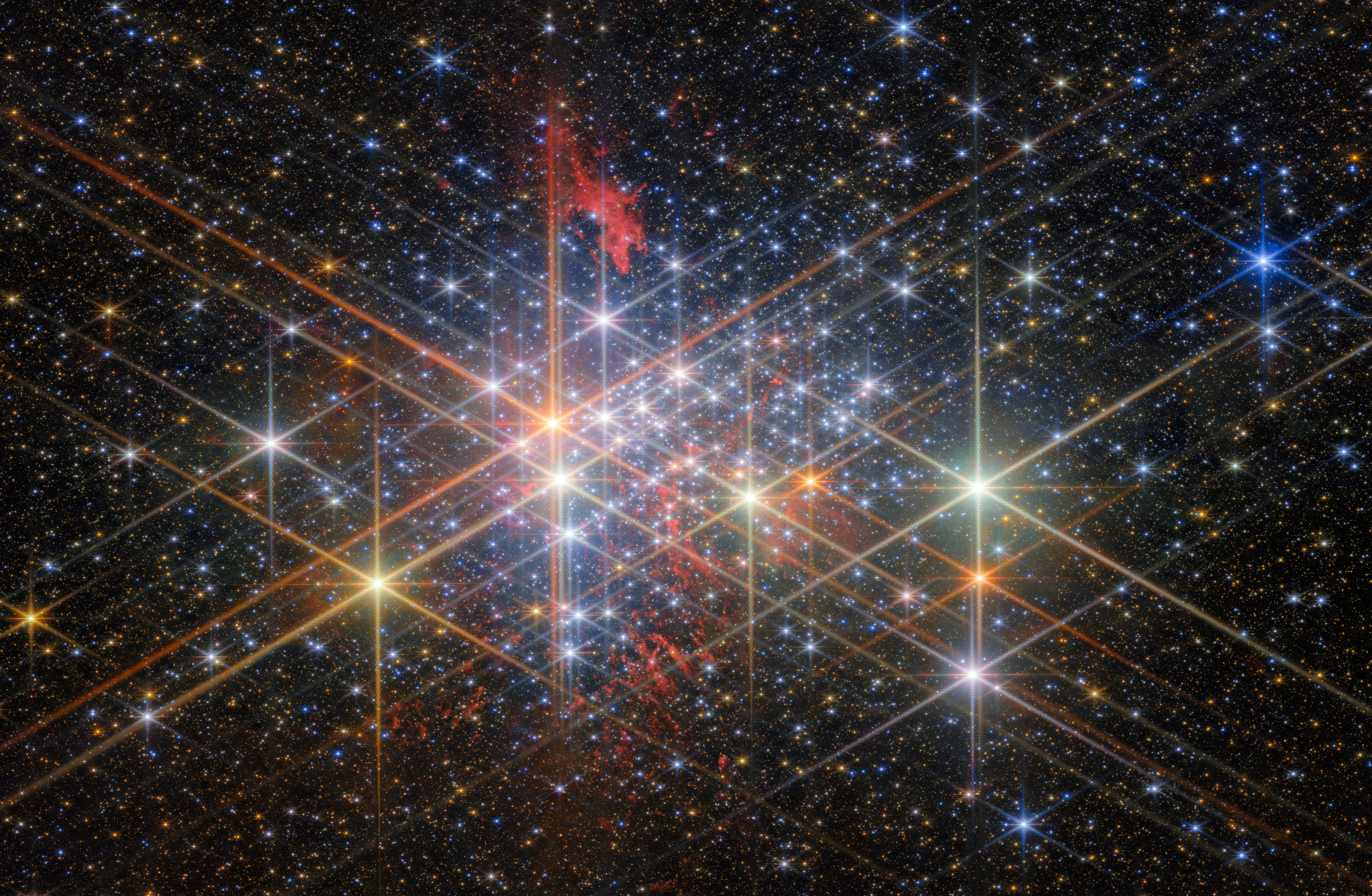
JWST image of star cluster Westerlund 1 with diffraction spikes

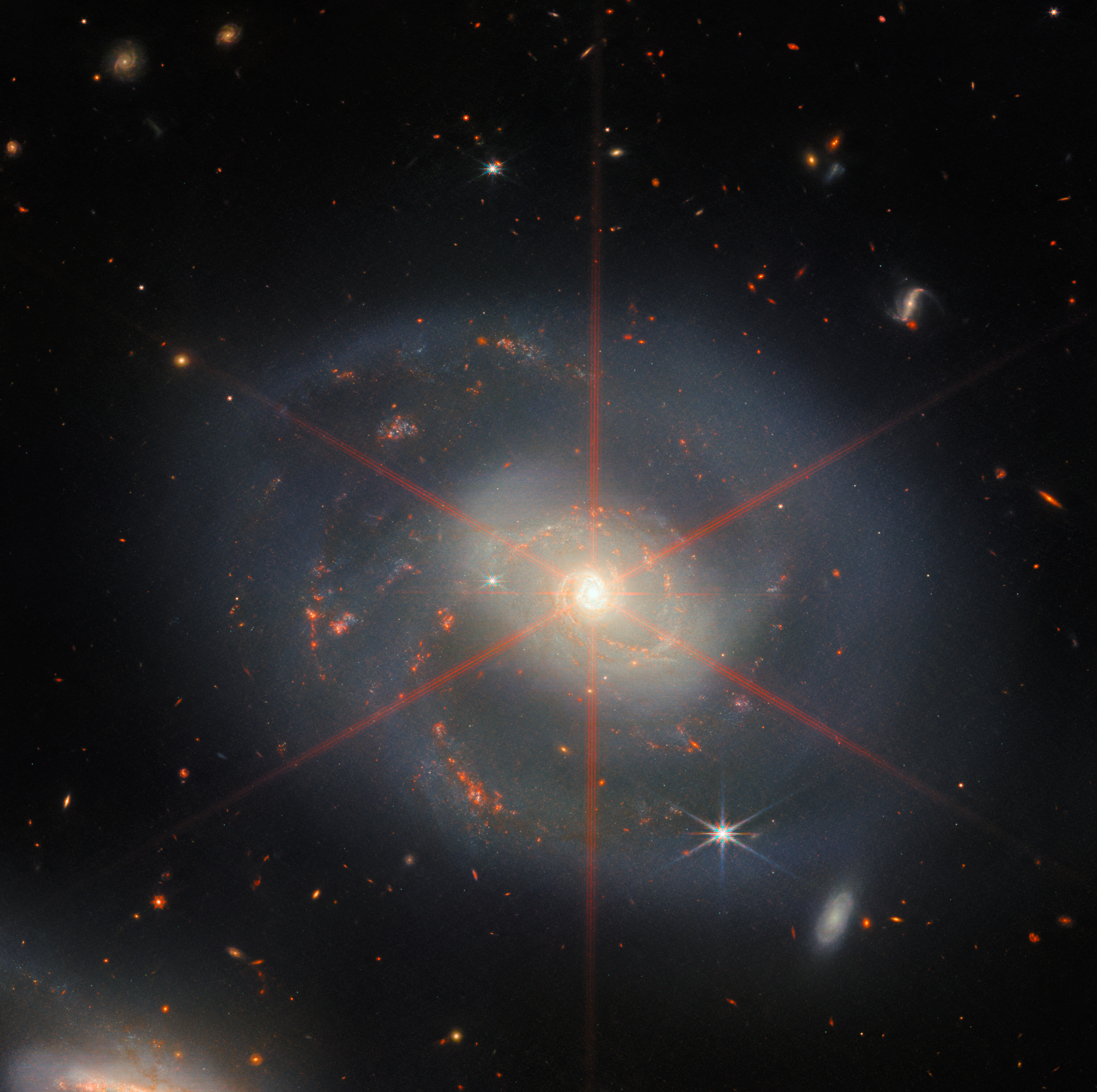
JWST image of the spiral galaxy NGC 7469 with diffraction spikes

== See also ==
- List of largest optical reflecting telescopes
- Cherenkov Telescope Array
