= Thirty Meter Telescope protests =

Series of demonstrations that began on the Island of Hawaii

- Part of the Hawaiian sovereignty movement
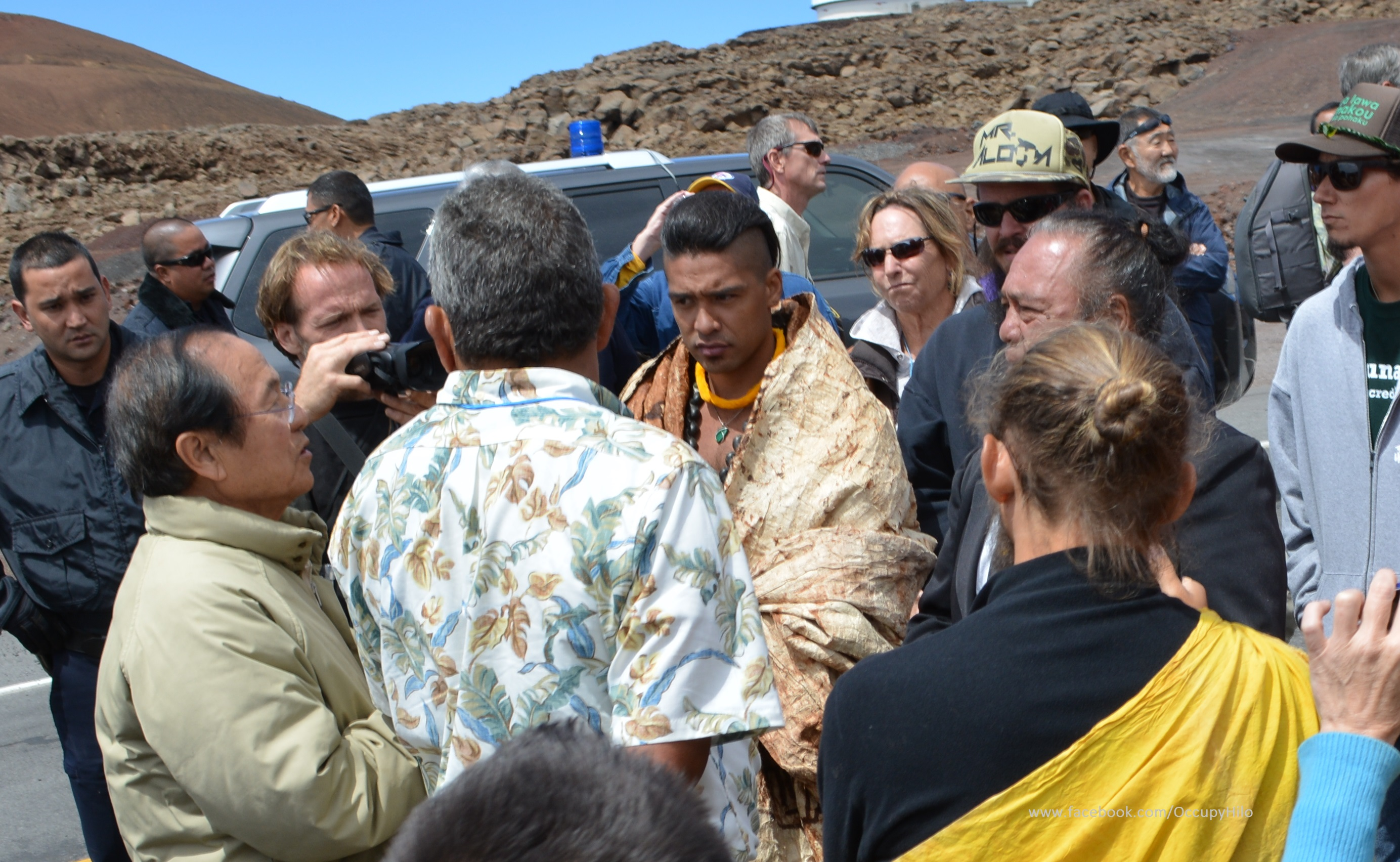
- Native Hawaiian practitioner, Lanakila Mangauil, "protector" Kahookahi Kanuha and others speaking with Mayor Billy Kenoi against the building of more telescopes on Mauna Kea on October 7, 2014
- Date: October 7, 2014 – early 2020
- Location: Mauna Kea Access Road near Mauna Kea Visitors Center; 19°45′32.97″N 155°27′23.07″W
- Caused by: Concern for indigenous, Native Hawaiian cultural and spiritual rights; Lack of community and native input; Concern over impact to Mauna Kea and groundwater aquifers; Concern for protected species and the environment; Concern for the religious and spiritual significance of Mauna Kea
- Goals: End construction of the Thirty Meter Telescope on Mauna Kea and ban all further development of the Mauna Kea observatories. Begin decommissioning of existing telescopes.
- Methods: Blockade; Occupation; Civil disobedience; Picketing; Demonstrations; Internet activism; Petitions; lawsuits

Casualties
- Arrested: 64

The Thirty Meter Telescope (TMT) protests were a series of protests and demonstrations that began on the Island of Hawaii over the choosing of Mauna Kea for the site location of the Thirty Meter Telescope. Mauna Kea is the most sacred dormant volcano of Native Hawaiian religion and culture, and in Kānaka Maoli (Native Hawaiian) tradition is home to the sky god Wākea and other gods. Protests began locally within the state of Hawaii on October 7, 2014 but went global within weeks of the April 2, 2015 arrest of 31 people who had blockaded the roadway to keep construction crews off the summit. Thousands later joined when attempts were made to restart construction.

The TMT, a $1.4 billion ground-based, large segmented mirror reflecting telescope grew from astronomers' prioritization in 2000 of a thirty-meter telescope to be built within the decade. Mauna Kea was announced as TMT's preferred site in 2009. Opposition to the project began shortly after the announcement of Mauna Kea as the chosen site out of 5 proposals. While opposition against the observatories on Mauna Kea has been ongoing since the first telescope, built by the University of Hawaii, this protest may be the most vocal. The project was expected to be completed by 2024, nearly simultaneously with the 39-meter Extremely Large Telescope being built in Chile; however, on December 2, 2015, the Supreme Court of Hawaii invalidated the TMT's building permits. The court ruled that due process was not followed. The TMT corporation then removed all construction equipment and vehicles from Mauna Kea, and re-applied for a new permit, meant to respect the Supreme Court's ruling. This was granted on September 28, 2018. On October 30, 2018, the Court validated the new construction permit.

The controversy has led to considerable division in the local community with residents choosing support or opposition. Notable native Hawaiian supporters include Peter Apo, sitting trustee of the Office of Hawaiian Affairs, and leading University of Hawaii professor and astronomer the late Dr. Paul Coleman, who in 2015 said "Hawaiians are just so tied to astronomy I cannot, in any stretch of the imagination, think that TMT is something that our ancestors wouldn't just jump on and embrace". In July 2019, 300 protestors gathered in support of the TMT project outside the Hawaii State Capitol in Honolulu. Notable opponents include Office of Hawaiian Affairs trustee for Hawai'i Mililani Trask, Native Hawaiian actor Jason Momoa, Samoan actor Dwayne Johnson, and practitioners of traditional Hawaiian culture and religion.

In early 2020, the protests and attempts at construction were halted by the onset of the COVID-19 pandemic. No construction has resumed as of 2024, and management of the mountaintop is being transferred to a new oversight authority with representatives of both astronomers and Native Hawaiian communities. In June 2025, the National Science Foundation dropped support for the TMT in favor of the Giant Magellan Telescope. Although the international consortium of scientists behind the TMT plans to press on, this loss of funding means the telescope may never be built.

== Background ==
=== Development of Mauna Kea observatories ===
After studying photos for NASA's Apollo program that contained greater detail than any ground based telescope, Gerard Kuiper began seeking an arid site for infrared studies. While he first began looking in Chile, he also made the decision to perform tests in the Hawaiian Islands. Tests on Maui's Haleakalā were promising but the mountain was too low in the inversion layer and often covered by clouds. On the "Big Island" of Hawaii, Mauna Kea is considered the highest island mountain in the world, measuring roughly 33,000 feet from the base deep under the Pacific Ocean. While the summit is often covered with snow the air itself is extremely dry. Kuiper began looking into the possibility of an observatory on Mauna Kea. After testing, he discovered the low humidity was perfect for infrared signals. He persuaded then-governor John A. Burns, to bulldoze a dirt road to the summit where he built a small telescope on Puʻu Poliʻahu, a cinder cone peak. The peak was the second highest on the mountain with the highest peak being holy ground, so Kuiper avoided it.

Next, Kuiper tried enlisting NASA to fund a larger facility with a large telescope, housing and other needed structures. NASA, in turn decided to make the project open to competition. Professor of physics John Jefferies of the University of Hawaii placed a bid on behalf of the university. Jefferies had gained his reputation through observations at Sacramento Peak Observatory. The proposal was for a two-meter telescope to serve both the needs of NASA and the university. While large telescopes are not ordinarily awarded to universities without well established astronomers, Jefferies and UH were awarded the NASA contract, infuriating Kuiper who felt that "his mountain" had been "stolen" from "him". Kuiper would abandon his site (the very first telescope on Mauna Kea) over the competition and begin work in Arizona on a different NASA project. After considerable testing by Jefferies' team, the best locations were determined to be near the summit at the top of the cinder cones. Testing also determined Mauna Kea to be superb for nighttime viewing due to many factors including the thin air, constant trade winds and being surrounded by sea. Jefferies would build a 2.24 meter telescope with the State of Hawaii agreeing to build a reliable, all weather roadway to the summit. Building began in 1967 and first light seen in 1970.

=== Observatory opposition ===
Although polls, some of them highly criticized, indicate that a majority of Hawaii residents support the Thirty Meter Telescope, opposition to the project and other observatories has existed since 1964. In Honolulu, the governor and legislature, enthusiastic about the development, set aside an even larger area for the observatory causing opposition in the city of Hilo. Native Hawaiian cultural practitioners kānaka ʻōiwi believed the entire site was sacred and that developing the mountain, even for science, would spoil the area. Environmentalists were concerned about rare native bird populations, and other citizens of Hilo were concerned about the sight of the domes from the city. Using town hall meetings, Jefferies emphasized the economic advantage and prestige the island would receive. Over the years, the opposition to the observatories may have become the most visible example of the conflict science has encountered over access and use of environmental and culturally significant sites. Opposition to development grew shortly after expansion of the observatories commenced. Once access was opened up by the roadway to the summit, skiers began using it for recreation and objected when the road was closed as a precaution against vandalism when the telescopes were being built. Hunters voiced concerns as did the Hawaiian Audubon Society who were supported by Governor George Ariyoshi.

The Audubon Society objected to further development on Mauna Kea over concerns to habitat of the endangered palila, an endemic species to only specific parts of this mountain. The bird is the last of the finch billed honeycreepers existing on the island. Over 50% of native bird species had been killed off due to loss of habitat from early western settlers or the introduction of non native species competing for resources. Hunters and sportsmen were concerned that the hunting of feral animals would be affected by the telescope operations. None of these concerns proved accurate. A "Save Mauna Kea" movement was inspired by the proliferation of telescopes with opposition believing development of the mountain to be sacrilegious. Native Hawaiian non-profit groups such as Kahea, whose goals are the protection of cultural heritage and the environment, oppose development on Mauna Kea as a sacred space to the Hawaiian religion. Today, Mauna Kea hosts the world's largest location for telescope observations in infrared and submillimeter astronomy. The land itself is protected by the US Historical Preservation Act due to its significance to Hawaiian culture but still allowed development.

=== Outrigger and Thirty Meter Telescope proposals ===
Further development of the Mauna Kea observatories is still opposed by environmental groups and some Native Hawaiians. A 2006 proposal for the Outrigger Telescopes to become extensions of the Keck Observatory was canceled after a judges determination that a full environmental impact statement must be prepared before any further development of the site. The "outrigger" would have linked the Keck I and Keck II telescopes. Environmental groups and Native Hawaiian opposition was stronger at this time than in the past, but NASA continued with the proposal. The group Mauna Kea Anaina Hou made several arguments against the development including that Mauna Kea was a sacred mountain to Native Hawaiians where many deities live, and that the cinder cone being proposed as the site was holy in Hawaiian tradition as a burial site for a demi-god. The group raised several other concerns such as environmental over native insects, the question of Ceded lands and an audit report, critical of the mountain's management.

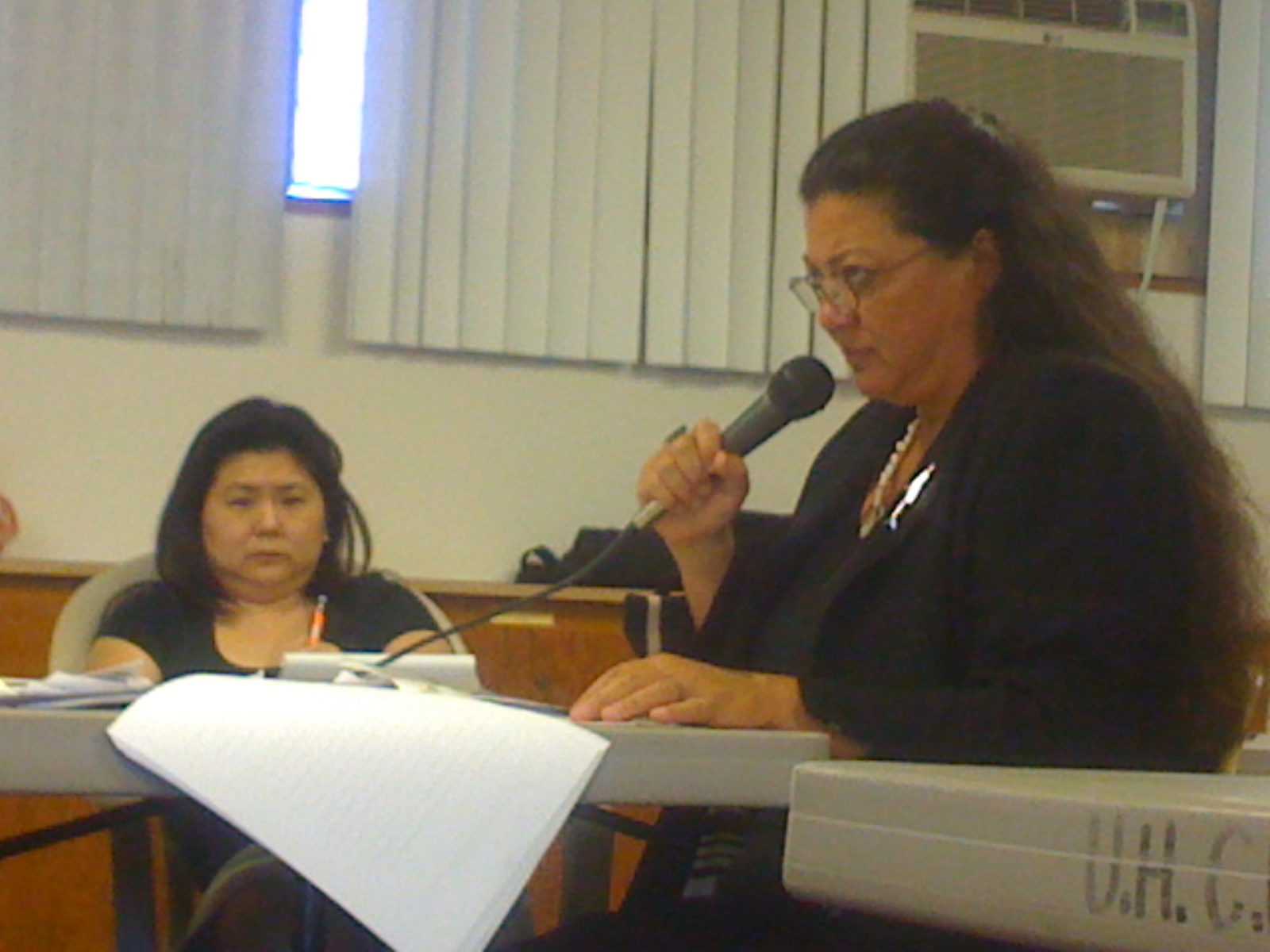
Kealoha Pisciotta, a former Mauna Kea Observatory employee, testifies at a State hearing in 2011

The Thirty Meter Telescope (TMT) is a proposed extremely large, segmented mirror telescope, planned for the summit of Mauna Kea. It is now the focal point of further development of the observatory site, with a current ongoing legal battle in the Hawaii court system. The proposal continues to spawn a great deal of controversy over the use of the site for science.

The TMT project is a response to recommendation in 2000 from the US National Academy of Sciences that a thirty-meter telescope be a top priority, and that it be built within the decade. Urgency in construction is due to the competitive nature of science with the European-Extremely Large Telescope also under construction. The two projects are also complementary, in that the EELT would only view the Southern Celestial Hemisphere, while Mauna Kea offers the best views of the Northern Celestial Hemisphere. However, Mauna Kea's summit is considered the most sacred of all the mountains in Hawaii to many Native Hawaiian people. Native Hawaiian activists such as Kealoha Pisciotta, a former employee of the Mauna Kea Observatories, have raised concerns over the perceived desecration of Mauna Kea posed by TMT construction and presence. Pisciotta, a former telescope systems specialist technician at James Clerk Maxwell Telescope, is one of several people suing to stop the construction and is also director of Mauna Kea Anaina Hou.

As of April, 2015, two separate legal appeals were still pending.

The 1998 study Mauna Kea Science Reserve and Hale Pohaku Complex Development Plan Update stated that "... nearly all the interviewees and all others who participated in the consultation process (Appendices B and C) called for a moratorium on any further development on the summit of Mauna Kea". Many native Hawaiians and environmentalists are opposed to any further telescopes.

The Hawaii Board of Land and Natural Resources conditionally approved the Mauna Kea site for the TMT in February 2011. While the approval has been challenged, the Board officially approved the site following a hearing on April 12, 2013.

=== Indigenous peoples rights ===
The issue of Native peoples, their religious freedom and rights in regards to authority for large science-based projects has become a major issue to contend with. Mount Graham in Arizona had an issue with the sanctity of the mountain raised by activists. Observatories have succeeded in being built, but only after protracted and expensive litigation and effort.

== Blockade and protests ==
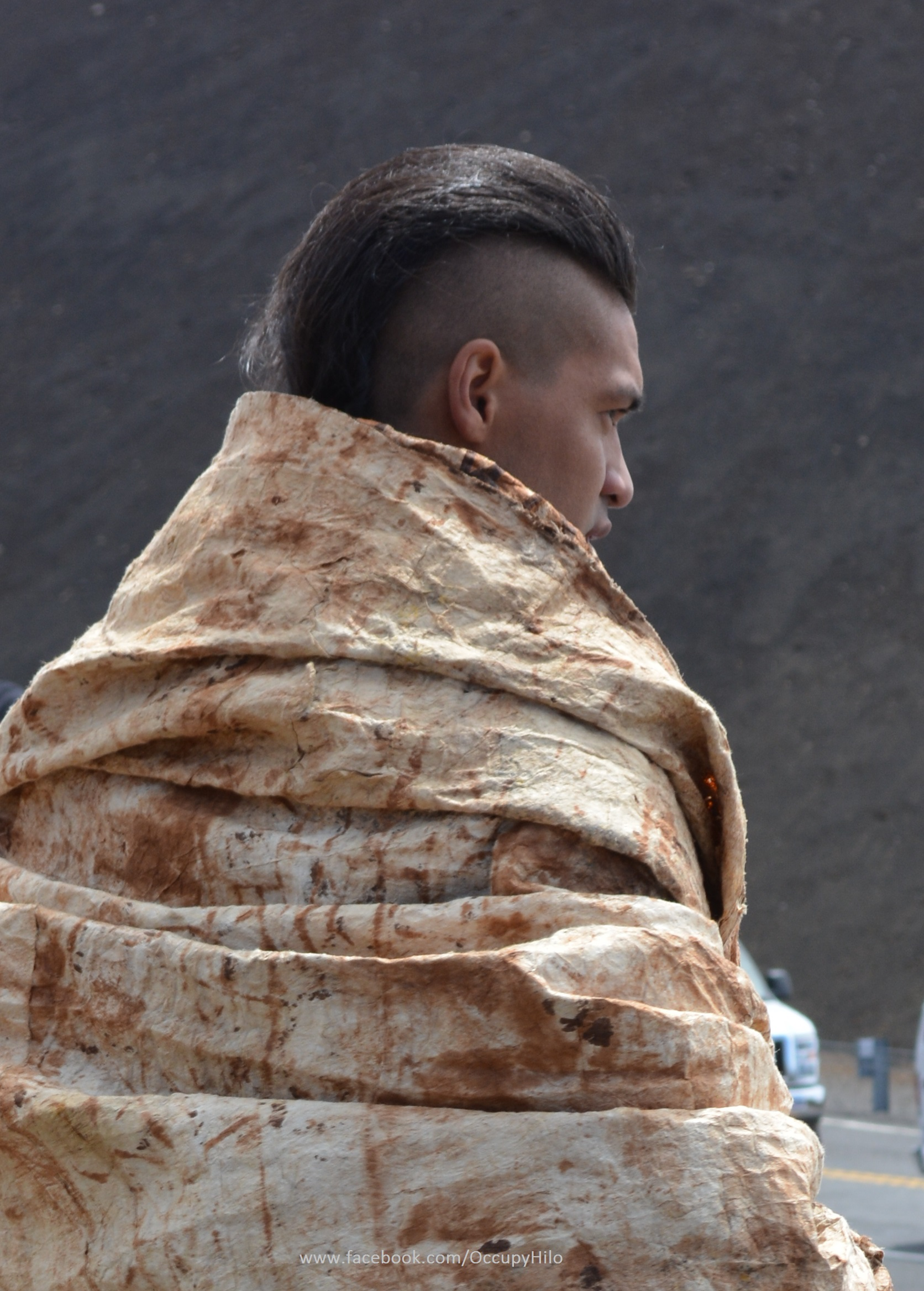
Hawaiian cultural practitioner, Joshua Lanakila Mangauil interrupted the TMT ground breaking on October 7, 2014

=== Roadway blockade and ground breaking interruption ===
On October 7, 2014 the groundbreaking for the telescope was being live streamed via webcam. The proceedings were interrupted when the official caravan encountered several dozen demonstrators picketing and chanting in the middle of the roadway. A planned ceremony at the base of the mountain was scheduled by the group, Mauna Kea Anaina Hou, in opposition of the telescope and in a press release dated that day, the organization Sacred Mauna Kea stated: "Native Hawaiians and non-Hawaiians will gather for a peaceful protest against the Astronomy industry and the State of Hawaii’s ground-breaking ceremony for a thirty-meter telescope (TMT) on the summit of Mauna Kea." Several members traveled up the mountain and were stopped by police, where they laid down in the road and blocked the caravan. The nonviolent protest did not stop or block any people but when the ceremony for the ground breaking began, protesters interrupted the blessing, stopping the proceedings as well as the groundbreaking. That same day in California, protesters demonstrated outside the headquarters of the Gordon and Betty Moore Foundation in Palo Alto, CA.

=== Second Mauna Kea blockade and arrests, 2015 ===
Beginning in late March 2015 demonstrators halted construction crews near the visitors center, again by blocking access of the road to the summit of the mountain. Heavy equipment had already been placed near the site. Daniel Meisenzahl, a spokesman for the University of Hawaii, stated that the 5 tractors trailers of equipment that were moved up the mountain the day before had alerted protesters that began organizing the demonstrations. Kamahana Kealoha of the group Sacred Mauna Kea stated that over 100 demonstrators had traveled up to the summit to camp overnight, to be joined by more protesters in the early morning to blockade crews. On April 2, 2015, 300 protesters were gathered near the visitor center where 12 people were arrested. 11 more protesters were arrested at the summit. Protesters, ranging in age from 27 to 75 years of age were handcuffed and led away by local police. Among the major concerns of the protest groups is whether the land appraisals were done accurately and that Native Hawaiians were not consulted. When the trucks were finally allowed to pass, protesters followed the procession up the summit. A project spokesman said that work had begun after arrests were made and the road cleared.

Among the arrests was professional surfer and former candidate for mayor of Kauai, Dustin Barca. A number of celebrity activists of Native Hawaiian descent, both local and national, began campaigning over social media, including Game of Thrones star Jason Momoa who urged Dwayne Johnson (The Rock) to join the protests with him on top of Mauna Kea. Construction was halted for one week at the request of Hawaii state governor David Ige on April 7, 2015 after the protest on Mauna Kea continued and demonstrations began to appear over the state. Project Manager, Gary Sanders stated that TMT agreed to the one-week stop for continued dialogue. Kealoha Pisciotta, president of Mauna Kea Anaina Hou viewed the development as positive but said opposition to the project would continue. Pisciotta also stated that the protests would continue to be within a Kapu Aloha; "moving in Aloha with steadfast determination".

=== Temporary halt ===
Governor Ige announced that the project was being temporarily postponed until at least April 20, 2015. In response to the growing protests the TMT Corporation's division of Hawaii Community Affairs launched an internet microsite, updating content regularly. The company also took to social media to respond to the opposition's growing momentum by hiring public relations firms to assist as the company's voice in the islands. TMT sublease payments on hold following order for a contested case hearing.

=== National and international demonstrations ===
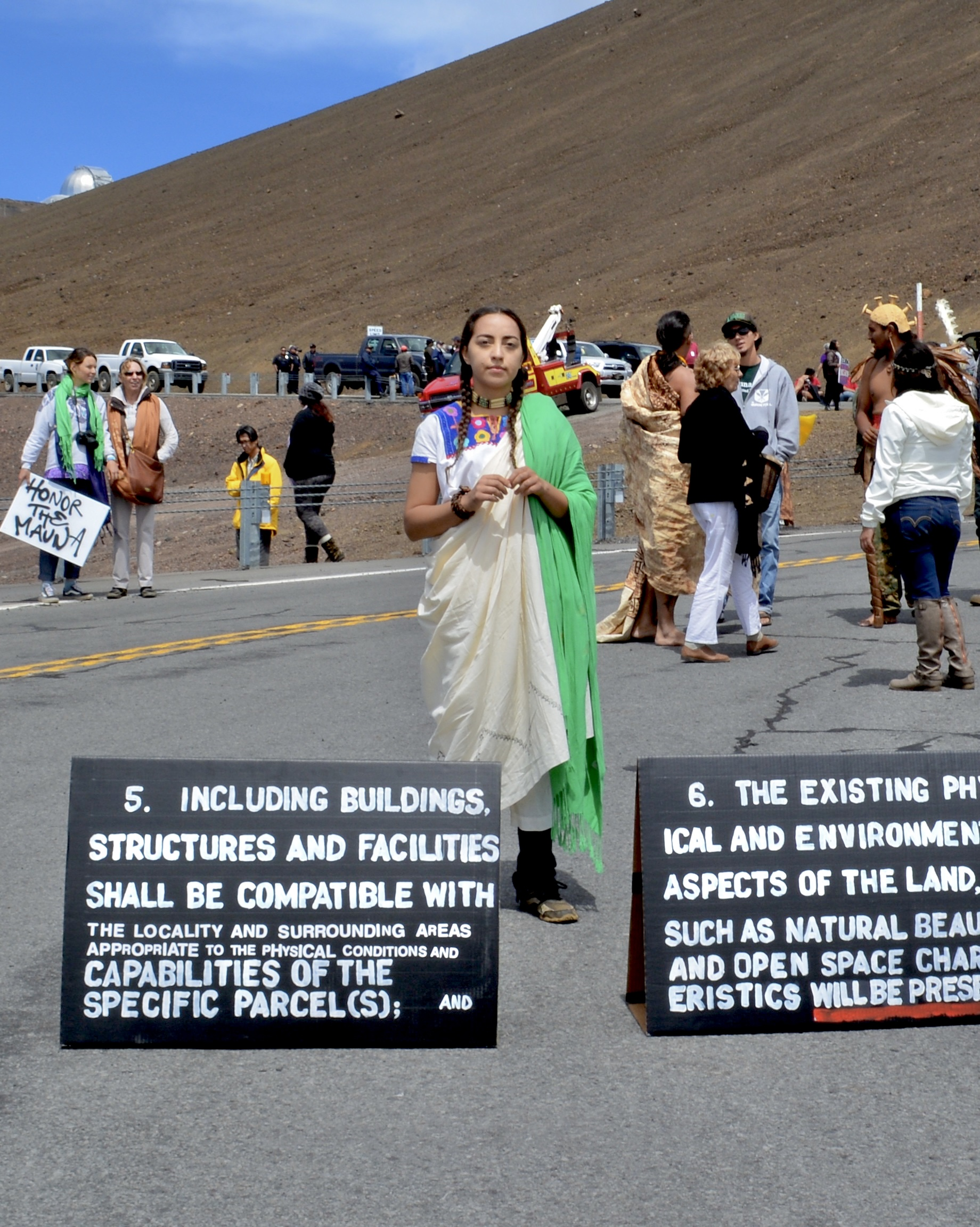
Demonstrators call themselves protectors, not protestors

The protests sparked statewide, national as well as international attention to Hawaiian culture, Mauna Kea and the 45-year history of 13 other telescopes on the mountain.

At the University of Hawaii Manoa, hundreds of students lined the streets for blocks and, one by one, they passed the stones from the student taro patch of the university's Center on Hawaiian Studies down the human chain to the lawn in front of the office university president, David Lassner, where the stones were used to build an ahu (the altar of a heiau) as a message to the university.

On April 21, 2015, hundreds of protesters filled the streets of Honolulu protesting against the TMT.

=== 2019 demonstrations ===
On July 14, 2019, an online petition titled "The Immediate Halt to the Construction of the TMT Telescope" was posted on Change.org. The online petition has currently gathered over 278,057 signatures worldwide. On 15 July, protestors blocked the access road to the mountain preventing the planned construction from commencing. On July 16, thirteen astronomical facilities on the mountain stopped activities and evacuated their personnel. On July 17, 33 protestors were arrested, all of whom were kūpuna, or elders, as the blockage of the access road continued. The days actions were described in a court declaration filed in connection to a Mauna Kea access case by Hawaii County Police, which claims that there was a "significant risk" that certain protesters would "respond with violence" if officers forcefully separated protesters blocking the road. A Native Hawaiian Legal Corporation legal observer there that day claims that the report over embellished the belief that there was a threat. A poetic short film, This is the Way We Rise by Ciara Lacy, presents the protests in a representation centered on Jamaica Heolimeleikalani Osorio. The film was screened at the 2021 Sundance Film Festival.

More than 1,000 people marched in Waikiki and gathered in Kapiolani Park on July 21, 2019 in protest of the project. The protest continued into August 2019 at the entrance of the Mauna Kea access road, in front of Pu'u Huluhulu on Hawaii Route 200. It was announced on August 9, that astronomers at other Mauna Kea observatories would return to work after halting for many weeks in response to the gathering protesters and activists. However, a former systems specialist for one of the facilities claimed it was wrong to blame the demonstrators stating: "They chose to close down for fear of protesters who are unarmed and nonviolent."

On 19 December, Governor David Ige announced at a press conference that he was reopening the access road and withdrawing law enforcement from the mountain . TMT representatives had informed him that they are not ready to start construction in the foreseeable future. The announcement came a day after the Hawaii County Council unanimously rejected a proposal by Mayor Harry Kim that would have authorized the county to accept reimbursement from the state for providing law enforcement on the mountain.

=== Puʻuhonua o Puʻuhuluhulu ===
On July 10, 2019, Gov. Ige and the Department of Transportation issued a press release informing the public of upcoming closure of Mauna Kea access road beginning July 15 in order to move large construction equipment to the TMT construction site.

Shortly after sunrise on July 13, 2019, the Royal Order of Kamehameha, along with Mauna Kea protectors began the process of designating Puʻuhuluhulu as a puʻuhonua which, historically, has served as a space of protection during contentious times. The Puʻuhonua o Puʻuhuluhulu boundaries were secured through ceremony and the approval of the Royal Order of Kamehameha, establishing a site of protection, sanctuary and refuge for Mauna Kea protectors. Situated on a 38-acre conservation district directly across from the Mauna Kea access road, Puʻuhonua o Puʻuhuluhulu have access to food, medical supplies, education, cultural practices and ceremony.

==== Governance and Code of Conduct ====
Kapu Aloha is the governance model for Puʻuhonua o Puʻuhuluhulu. Under Kapua aloha there is a subset of rules that include:

1. Kapu Aloha always
2. NO weapons, NO smoking of any kind and NO alcohol.
3. MĀLAMA each other.
4. Ask consent for any pictures or video.
5. Pick up ʻōpala you see.
6. BE PONO.

==== Mauna Medics ====
The Mauna Medics hui was co-founded by Dr. Kalama O Ka Aina Niheu in 2017 order to provide medical assistance should any of the protector need medical assistance. The Mauna Medics hui is on site at Puʻuhonua o Puʻuhuluhulu 24 hours a day and are available to treat minor medical issues such as altitude sickness. Due to the altitude and harsh weather conditions at Puuhonua o Puuhuluhulu, the Mauna Medics treat illnesses such as hypothermia, sunburn, and dehydration. Medical professionals such as doctors, nurses, and paramedics volunteer their time at Puʻuhonua o Puʻuhuluhulu and all medical supplies are also donated to make sure that protectors are cared for. The Mauna Medic hui provides sunscreen, water stations, and basic medical advice to all visitors of Puʻuhonua o Puʻuhuluhulu free of charge.

==== Puʻuhuluhulu University ====
On Maunakea at Puʻuhonua o Puʻuhuluhulu exists Puʻuhuluhulu University. A key component in the movement to prevent the construction of the Thirty Meter Telescope on Maunakea is the creation of access to education rooted in Hawaiian history and Hawaiian culture. "Presley Keʻalaanuhea Ah Mook Sang, a Hawaiian language instructor at the University of Hawaii at Mānoa, said she first came up with the idea to start a community-led school or 'teach-in' after witnessing the crowd swell in that first week from hundreds of protesters to thousands". The grassroots establishment of Puʻuhuluhulu University at Puʻuhonua o Puʻuhuluhulu has created a platform for the lāhui (Hawaiian Nation) and facilitators of the University to co-create a reciprocal and place-based style approach to learning that is accessible to people of all ages and backgrounds.

Puʻuhuluhulu University provides free classes to anyone who visits Puʻuhonua o Puʻuhuluhulu. The course offerings range from Introduction to Hawaiian Language, Hawaiian Law, the history of Hawaiʻi, and tours of Puʻuhuluhulu. The common goal across the wide variety of courses is the intent to uplift the community with ʻike Hawaiʻi (Hawaiian knowledge) through their teachings. Classes at Puʻuhuluhulu University are taught by kiaʻi (protectors) of Maunakea, community members, and professors at the University of Hawaiʻi. One of the most consistent courses offered at Puʻuhuluhulu University is Hawaiian Language. Kaipu Baker, a recent graduate of the University of Hawaiʻi who has taught Hawaiian language courses at Puʻuhuluhulu University noted that learning the Hawaiian language creates access to knowing cultural stories and their significance embedded in the language.

In addition to the daily course offerings by Puʻuhuluhulu University are several community services created by University facilitators to support the well-being of both long-term and daily visitors at Puʻuhonua o Puʻuhuluhlu. These services operate as stations on the University Campus that include Hale Mana Māhū, where you can learn about queer history and theory from a Native Hawaiian perspective, Hale Kūkākūkā where people can discuss and unpack their experiences on Maunakea, and a lomi (massage) tent. The motto of Puʻuhuluhulu University is "E Mau ke Ea o ka ʻĀina i ka Pono" which can be translated to "The Sovereignty of the Land is Perpetuated in what is Just" and the hope to fulfill this motto is in the daily creation of a true Hawaiian Place of Learning.

==== Daily Protocol ====
On the Mauna Kea access road in front of what is now known as the kupuna (elders) tent there is daily protocol at 8am, 12noon and 5:30pm, in which protectors and visitors are able to learn and participate in Hawaiian cultural practices such as oli (chant), hula, and hoʻokupu (offerings). Some of the oli and hula that are taught and performed during protocol are: E Ala E, E Kānehoalani E, E Hō Mai, Nā ʻAumakua, E Iho Ana, ʻŌ Hānau ka Mauna a Kea, MaunaKea Kuahiwi, Kua Loloa Keaʻau i ka Nāhele, ʻAuʻa ʻIa, I One Huna Ka Pahu, Na Kea Koʻu Hoʻohihi ka Mauna, ʻAi Kamumu Kēkē, Kūkulu ka Pahu, Kaʻi Kūkulu. Indigenous peoples from all around the world have attended protocol to offer solidarity with the Protect Mauna Kea movement. Puʻuhonua o Puʻuhuluhulu's noon protocol has also had Jason Momoa, Dwayne "The Rock" Johnson, Damian Marley, Jack Johnson, and other celebrities participate and give offerings (hoʻokupu) of solidarity to the Mauna Kea protectors.

=== End and subsequent developments ===
In early 2020, the onset of the COVID-19 pandemic resulted in everyone leaving the mountain, with some astronomers and activists thereafter engaging in dialogue. In July 2023, a new state appointed oversight board, which includes Native Hawaiian community representatives and cultural practitioners, began a five-year transition to assume management over Mauna Kea and its telescope sites, which may be a path forward. In April 2024, TMT's project manager apologized for the organization having "contributed to division in the community", and stated that TMT's approach to construction in Hawai'i is "very different now from TMT in 2019."

In June 2025 the United States' National Science Foundation dropped support for the TMT in favor of the Giant Magellan Telescope. This lack of funding puts the TMT's future in doubt, although the scientists in the TMT international consortium said they would press forward.

== Permitting ==
On December 2, 2015, the Supreme Court of Hawaii invalidated the TMT's building permits, ruling that due process was not followed when the Board of Land and Natural Resources approved the permit before the contested case hearing. The TMT company chairman stated: "T.M.T. will follow the process set forth by the state." On December 16, the TMT corporation began removal of all construction equipment and vehicles from Mauna Kea. As noted above, the Supreme Court of the State of Hawaii ultimately approved the permit following a lengthy contested hearing case. Both the contested hearing case and the Hawaii Supreme Court rejected the arguments asserted by the protesters, finding them to be without merit.

On September 28, 2017, the Hawaii Board of Land and Natural Resources approved the TMT's Conservation District Use Permit. On October 30, 2018, the Supreme Court of Hawaii validated the construction permit.

== Reactions ==
The protests have caused many to voice their support for either the telescope being built, or for its construction on Mauna Kea to be halted. Many of the more public support for either side has caused massive controversy and discussion between science and native culture.

Independent polls commissioned by local media organizations show consistent support for the project in the islands with over two thirds of local residents supporting the project. These same polls indicate Native Hawaiian community support remains split with about half of Hawaiian respondents supporting construction of the new telescope.

=== Against protesters ===
In 2015 University of California astronomers sent out a mass email urging other astronomers to support the TMT through a petition written by a native Hawaiian science student. Concern was raised over the content of the email, with the wording of "a horde of native Hawaiians" to describe the protesters considered to be problematic and potentially racist.

Hawaii based businesses that support the telescope were named in a boycott that was popularized on social media. Businesses included were KTA Super Stores and HPM Building Supply.

=== Support for protesters ===
Scientists have taken to Twitter and other social media platforms to voice their support publicly for the protest using #ScientistsforMaunaKea, in which they highlight their field and why they feel that the TMT is not needed on the mountain. An open letter was also published and signed by nearly 1,000 members of the scientific community that takes no position on the siting of TMT on Maunakea, but denounces "the criminalization of the protectors on Maunakea". In an online petition, a group of Canadian academics, scientists, and students have called on Prime Minister Justin Trudeau together with Industry Minister Navdeep Bains and Science Minister Kirsty Duncan to divest Canadian funding from the project. Native Hawaiian academics from various fields have also voiced their opposition to the telescope and participated in the protests themselves, such as Oceanographer Rosie Alegado. On July 20, 2019 an online petition titled "A Call to Divest Canada's Research Funding for the Thirty Meter Telescope on Mauna Kea" has been posted on Change.org.

Several celebrities have supported the protest. Some, such as Damian Marley, Jason Momoa, Dwayne Johnson, Jack Johnson and Ezra Miller traveled to the location and participated in the protests. Others, such as Leonardo DiCaprio, Bruno Mars, Emilia Clarke, Nathalie Emmanuel, Rosario Dawson, Jill Wagner, Jai Courtney, Kelly Slater and Madison Bumgarner have used social media to promote the cause. Hawaiian athletes including Jordan Yamamoto, Ilima-Lei Macfarlane and Max Holloway have publicly supported the protests.

== See also ==
- Maui solar telescope protests
- Giant Magellan Telescope
- Office of Hawaiian Affairs
