= Maui solar telescope protests =

Opposition to the Maui solar telescope

The Maui solar telescope protests were a series of protests and demonstrations attempting to block the construction of the Daniel K. Inouye Solar Telescope (DKIST) on the summit of Haleakalā in Maui, Hawaii.

== Background ==
Beginning in 1958, telescopes began to be built atop Maui's Haleakalā summit becoming the Haleakalā High Altitude Observatory Site, owned and managed by the University of Hawaii. In 2010 the Hawai'i Department of Land and Natural Resources issued a permit for the construction, but that permit was revoked because it was granted before a required contested case hearing. Two hearings had to be held because the hearing officer of the first meeting was disqualified for ex parte communications with representatives of Daniel Inouye. The second meeting resulted in the new hearing officer recommending the permits. Groundbreaking took place in 2012. Construction was well underway even with a lawsuit to the Hawaii Supreme court. During an appeal of the second permit, one of the justices was concerned about the disconnect between an environmental impact study that showed a major impact, and the board's decision that there would be no substantial impact.

By February 2022 construction on DKIST had finished and it performed its first scientific observations.

== 2015 protests ==
In June 2015, protesters blockaded the baseyard at the foot of the mountain that served as a staging area for construction. They succeeded in turning back the convoy delivery. They attempted the delivery again in late July.

In the early morning of July 31, 2015, activists, protesters and demonstrators showed up to block the Maui Baseyard. Aware that protesters were planning a demonstration, Maui police put out a statement saying, "Maui Police Department respects the rights for people to demonstrate peacefully," and, "We will respond in an appropriate manner." Protesters lay on the ground attached to PVC pipe and chains in an attempt to stop the construction of the telescope. Police arrested 20 people ranging in age from 19 to 60. One of those arrested was a Hawaiian Studies professor at the University of Hawaii, Maui, Kaleikoa Ka‘eo, who stated, "Fundamentally, we are asserting our human rights". Activist Trinette Furtado was not arrested but said, "We are not anti-telescope, we are not anti-science... We are for the mountain, we are for preserving our culture. We stand for the conservation, desecration, archaeological and Hawaiian access laws which protect Haleakala." Maui Police released the photos of 18 of the 20 arrested later that day.

On August 19, 2015, approximately 150 protesters attempted to block the convoy of construction trucks from its baseyard. Eight people were arrested when they refused to move from the roadway. Once past the first group of protesters, the convoy was again blocked at Haleakalā Crater road with debris scattered on the roadway. Police in full riot gear carried protesters away. Among those arrested was Joshua Lanakila Mangauil, a leader of the Thirty Meter Telescope protests.

== 2016-2017 ==
In October 2016, the Hawaii Supreme court upheld the BLNR permit.

On August 2, 2017, protesters attempted to block the equipment convoy containing the primary mirror for the telescope. Over 100 protesters had converged at the intersection of Kula Highway and Old Haleakalā Highway on the evening of August 1.

== See also ==
- Giant Magellan Telescope
- Office of Hawaiian Affairs
- Thirty Meter Telescope
- Thirty Meter Telescope protests
