= Maile Meyer =

Maile Tomlinson Meyer-Broderick
- Born: May 10, 1957 (age 69); Island of Oʻahu in the ahupuaʻa of Kailua
- Occupations: Kānaka Maoli community advocate and publisher
- Known for: Worked on the printing, reprinting, and distribution of numerous publications regarding Hawaiian culture, history, and all things Hawaiian.
- Notable work: Kahoʻolawe Nā Leo o Kanaloa published in 1995, Ē Luku Wale Ē published in 2015, and Kūʻe Petitions: A Mau Loa Aku No published in 2020

Maile Tomlinson Meyer-Broderick (born May 10, 1957) is a Kānaka Maoli community advocate, entrepreneur, small-business owner, nonprofit executive director, publisher, and consultant.

== Early life ==
Maile was born and raised on the island of Oʻahu in the ahupuaʻa of Kailua. She is Kānaka Maoli with Hawaiʻi and Maui lineages and also has ancestry from China, Germany, and England. Maile grew up in a family of seven siblings and was raised next-door to her twenty-one first cousins. Maile's mother, Emma Akana Aluli, was the youngest of six siblings, and she started the Young of Heart Workshop & Gallery in 1972, a nonprofit organization focused on connecting with youth through art and creativity. Maile's father, Harry King Meyer, ran the Hawaiiana Hotel down on Beachwalk in 1952. Maile's entrepreneurial, small-business and nonprofit interests have strong connections to her parents and her larger family. The Aluli family is made up of many activists, artists and Kānaka Maoli leaders including Irmgard Farden Aluli, Noa Emmett Aluli, Yuklin Aluli, Manulani Aluli Meyer, and Meleanna Aluli Meyer.

== Education ==
Maile graduated from Punahou School in 1975 and later attended Stanford University, where she earned a BA in Graphic Design and Photography and met her husband, Michael Broderick. She received an MBA in Arts Management from the Anderson School of Management at the University of California, Los Angeles. She returned to Hawaiʻi with her husband in 1988 after working in photography and advertising.

== Profession ==
Maileʻs first job on Oʻahu was as a marketing director for the Bishop Museum Press before she started Native Books Inc. in 1990. Native Books Inc. started as a business that focused on selling books connected to Hawaiʻi. In 1993 Barbara Pope, Nelson Foster and Maile Meyer started ʻAi Pōhaku Press, allowing them to publish and distribute high-quality books about Hawaiʻi and the Pacific, focusing specifically on cultural traditions and natural systems. In 1995 the small, mail-order business Nā Mea found a home in downtown Honolulu when it became Native Books & Beautiful things, a co-op that included locally made cultural implements, clothing, food, gifts and more. Maile went on to open and then close several other locations in the span of 15 years including locations in Kalihi, the Hilton Hawaiian Shopping Center, Waikīkī, and on the island of Maui. By 2020, there were two locations left, Nā Mea Hawaiʻi (renamed from Nā Mea Hawaiʻi/Native Books) at Ward Center and the newly opened Native Books located at Arts & Letters Nuʻuanu.

Through ʻAi Pōhaku Press, Native Books and Kaiao Press, an imprint of Native Books, Maile Meyer has worked to print, reprint and distribute many books about Hawaiian culture, Hawaiʻi's history, and all things Hawaiians. Some notable books published through 'Ai Pōhaku and distributed by Native Books include

- Kahoʻolawe Nā Leo o Kanaloa published in 1995 documents the history of Kahoʻolawe through photographs, stories, chants and histories in both ʻŌlelo Hawaiʻi and English.
- Ē Luku Wale Ē published in 2015 documents the devastation and destruction of sacred cultural and historical Kānaka Maoli sites through photography and chants in order to build what is now known as the H-3, an interstate highway.
- Kūʻe Petitions: A Mau Loa Aku No published in 2020 documents the Hawaiian peoples' strong opposition to the annexation of Hawaiʻi by the United States by sharing signed copies of the original petitions, including over 95% of the Kānaka Maoli adult population of the day.

== Community service ==
Maile continues to run the nonprofit started by her mother, previously known as the Young of Heart Workshop & Gallery, and renamed Puʻuhonua Society in 2004. Through her work as the executive director she supports programs such as Keanahala, a group of pandanus weavers focused on revitalizing the Hawaiian cultural practice of weaving lau hala, Aupuni Space, a contemporary art studio and gallery, and Contact, an annual contemporary Hawaiian art exhibit.
