= Alegado =

Alegado is a surname. Notable people with the surname include:

- Joannes Alegado, Filipino politician
- Mazel Paris Alegado, Filipino skateboarder
- Michael Alegado, American professional wrestler
- Rosie Alegado, Hawaiian microbial oceanographer
