= Kapu Aloha =

Kanaka Maoli (Hawaiʻi) code of conduct

Kapu aloha is an evolving, philosophical code of conduct that is culturally informed by Kanaka Maoli ontologies and epistemologies, being expressed politically through non-violent direct action, and ceremonially through behavioral conduct in alignment with Kanaka Maoli cultural practices and notions of the sacred. The term kapu aloha comes from the merging of two foundational Hawaiian language words kapu (to set apart; to prohibit; to make sacred or holy), and aloha (to love; show mercy; to have compassion upon). Kanaka Maoli cultural practitioners maintain that kapu aloha evolved from an unspoken cultural edict surrounding ceremony. As the practice of kapu aloha started to infiltrate the political realm, its ethos and praxis spread to include non-Kanaka Maoli settler-allies and those unfamiliar with Native Hawaiian culture.

From the 1990s to the present, kapu aloha began to take shape and a term was adopted that replicated its evolution from a strictly Kanaka Maoli, cultural, social, spiritual, and ceremonial edict to a political practice that incorporated all of these frames. In 2015, kapu aloha was introduced to a wider audience when kiaʻi mauna (mountain protectors) took to protecting Mauna Kea/Mauna a Wākea from the development of the Thirty Meter Telescope (TMT). The philosophy of kapu aloha was reinvigorated when Hawaiʻi State officials announced that the construction of the TMT would start again on July 15, 2019. Kiaʻi have been successful in delaying the development of the TMT establishing a puʻuhonua (place of refuge) at the Kīpuka Puʻuhuluhulu.

Kapu aloha is the code of conduct employed by the community at the Puʻuhonua o Puʻuhuluhulu, and It is seen as a driving force for social and political change within the movement to protect Mauna Kea. Kapu aloha has been adopted more broadly by various communities in Hawaiʻi. Kapu Aloha has been taken up in the Save Sherwood Forest and Kū Kiaʻi Kahuku movements. In an interview at the Puʻuhonua o Puʻuhuluhulu, two Kanaka Maoli kumu hula, elders and educators Hōkūlani Holt and Pualani Kanahele Kanakaʻole articulated that kapu aloha unites those who practice it to place/space, to each-other, to speaking the truth and to reciprocal relationships. Kapu aloha serves as an elevated mode of conduct that represents the collectives’ will to protect wahi pana (storied places) and wahi kapu (sacred spaces).

== Kapu Aloha: Philosophy, Edict, Onto-genealogical-ethos, and Practice ==
Kapu aloha is seen by kia'i as a commitment to maintaining peaceful dissent and culturally informed interaction with the opposition while traversing highly emotional situations at Mauna Kea, Kahuku, and Sherwood Forrest. Many Kanaka Maoli relate to Mauna Kea ancestrally through cosmogonic oral histories. Mauna Kea is considered to be the wao akua (realm of the divine) and is home to multiple elemental and ancestrally venerated water deities called akua, e.g., Poliʻahu, Waiau, Lilinoe, Kahoupokāne, Kalauakolea and Kāneikawaiola. It is for these reasons that many Kanaka Maoli/settler-ally activists and members of the lāhui Hawaiʻi (community/nation) understand Mauna Kea to be sacred and feel a profound obligation to protect Mauna Kea from the development of the TMT (Thirty Meter Telescope). This ancestral and relational connection to place is bound by the ʻaha hoʻowili moʻo (ancestral umbilicus). Native Hawaiian scholar Iokepa Salazar states that:

“It is, at once, an ancestor, a portal to the Akua, an elder sibling, a primary source of water for the people, and a place of spiritual being and reflection for Kanaka ʻŌiwi. This body of thought and way of relating to the natural world is part of a deeply held ethical positionality common to many ʻŌiwi, what are described as an onto-genealogical ethos: that is, to care for the land, water and other natural beings.”

ʻAha (Ceremony) are held three times daily at both the Puʻuhonua o Puʻuhuluhulu and the University of Hawaiʻi at Mānoa's John Henry Wise Field and are facilitate by kia'i and students. In the spaces where kapu aloha is enacted, alcohol, drugs, and tobacco are prohibited at all times. According to Kanaka Maoli scholar Ty. Kawika Tengan, kapu aloha is a tool used in ceremony that enacts a separation of ordinary life to mark the activities as sacred. Manulani Aluli Meyer a Kanaka Maoli scholar, in a University of Hawaii panel discussion and commentary, states: "A Kapu Aloha is a multidimensional concept and practice inspired by our kupuna. It has been used within a Hawaiian cultural context for many years." The practice initiates a discipline to remain compassionate and for those involved to use only aloha towards others. Mauna Kea Anaina Hou, is an organization dedicated to the protection of Mauna Kea. The organization views Kapu aloha as "[a] philosophy not just a word. Kapu Aloha is Aloha in action. When Aloha is enacted, our actions are overseen by the Akua, ʻAumakua, and Kūpuna. Every participant can act as they choose, but they are responsible for their own actions and intentions." The organization includes 11 attributes and actions individuals should heed, closing with; "Choose to redirect anger in righteous, non-violent, and peaceful actions in a collective way. Anger is a normal human response to injustice and Kapu Aloha gives us a way to seek justice in non-violent ways." Puʻuhonua o Puʻuhuluhulu is the site kiaʻi mauna have established at the base of Mauna Kea. Adjacent to the kīpuka Puʻuhuluhulu and at the base of Mauna Kea is the ʻala hele kūpuna (elders' road) where the elders are convened and where morning, mid-day, evening protocol and ceremony are held. Rules at the Pu'uhonua o Pu'uhuluhulu are aligned with teachings of kapu aloha which include:

1. Kapu Aloha Always.

2. NO weapons, NO smoking of any kind and NO alcohol.

3. MĀLAMA (care for) each other.

4. Ask consent for any pictures or video.

5. Pick up ʻōpala (trash) you see.

6. BE PONO.

== Kapu Aloha's Evolution ==
Pua Case, a kumu hula, Native Hawaiian cultural practitioner, and kiaʻi mauna (protector of Mauna Kea), articulates that kapu aloha is a way of embodying the sacred, and a sense that one must act in reverence and respect in spaces considered sacred. Case maintains that the philosophy of kapu aloha has always been represented through an unspoken Hawaiian cultural edict that frames cultural practices and ceremonies. According to Case, as Kanaka Maoli spaces opened up to settler-allies and those unfamiliar with the conduct of kapu aloha, developing a term that embodied its ethos became necessary for its continuity on a broader scale. Kapu aloha is believed to have evolved from ceremony to a political form in the 1990s with marches like the 125th anniversary of the overthrow of the Hawaiian Kingdom in 1993 and through the Mālama Mākua movement in 1996. Case states that:

"We lucky that we had ceremony enough since the 1990s that brought that term to us, that term is in full bloom right now and is guiding us so when we close our eyes at night and we have said remember, 'sacred mountain sacred conduct, kapu aloha.' We are assured that we are going to be able to do that much more than had we not had that term. We'd be sleeping with two eyes open. But now we sleep...thats kapu aloha. Kapu aloha is the magic, it's the magnet, it is the magnificence coming from the mauna right to this ala and saying this is the reminder of how we conduct ourselves. Sacred mountain, sacred conduct." (11:11–12:14)

Scholar Ty Kawika Tengan a Kanaka Maoli Ethnic Studies professor at the University of Hawai'i at Mānoa believes he was first introduced to the idea of kapu aloha at a ceremonial event in 2002, held at Puʻukoholā. Kahuna Nui and kumu hula, John Lake lead a ceremony at the site of the heiau which Tengan expresses as a site where:

"The tensions of culture, history, gender, and discourse are thus productive of what I call ritual slippage. On the one hand, participants are conscious of their ability to slip out of their modern identities and into their maoli ones, embodied in the very act of donning traditional garb, the malo for the men. On the other hand, that very process makes such identities difficult if not impossible to secure, especially in a site where the modern and touristic are physically present." (p. 101)

At Puʻukoholā, Kahuna Nui John Lake proclaimed "...an injunction to extend kindness, empathy, and love to one another." Tengan maintains that this injunction was an important adhesive that bound the events and ceremonies at Puʻukoholā to an elevated code of conduct which was necessary for a space that attracted the cultural, modern, and touristic entanglements that make up daily life in Hawaiʻi.

Kahuna Nui John Lake presided over an annual cultural event held in August of each year since 1991. The original purpose of the event was to repair the long-held animosity between the families of Kamehameha and cousin Keōua Kuahuʻula through cultural ceremony and protocol. Lake along with community elders decided to open the event to the community-at-large, hosting local non-profits, artisans, and crafters. Tourists and locals engaged in multi-day activities that allowed for education and reflection. Although Tengan found parallels at Puʻukoholā, Kapu Aloha was not a part of the events nor was it practiced by Kuhuna John Lake.

According to Joshua Lanakila Mangauil, co-founder of the Hawaiian Cultural Center of Hamākua, kapu aloha was a practice embraced by Hawaiian immersion/charter schools when he attended Kanu o Ka ʻĀina. Author and scholar Dr. Manulani Meyer argues that when Kanaka Maoli elders and leaders are questioned as to the authenticity of kapu aloha, they will often reference traditional cultural epistemes drawing on the practicality of kapu aloha's evolution as a continual cultural praxis.

== See also ==
- Aloha ʻĀina
