= Chinese Future Giant Telescope =

Proposed optical telescope in China

- Location: People's Republic of China
- Diameter: 30 m (98 ft 5 in)

The Chinese Future Giant Telescope is a proposed ground-based optical telescope with a primary mirror that has a 30-meter diameter, making it an extremely large telescope. It encompasses ground-based optical, radio, sub-millimeter wave and space telescopes, covering multi-band observations. The goal is to explore cutting-edge issues such as the origin of the universe, black holes, and the evolution of stars and galaxies.

== Major characteristics ==
The Chinese Future Giant Telescope has a primary focal ratio of 1.2. Its primary mirror is segmented with 1020 annular submirrors arranged in 17 concentric annuli. Each segment has average length and width both of 0.8 m. Apart from a conventional Cassegrain focus, four Nasmyth foci on two double-deck platforms on both sides are also present. There is a Coudé focus provided for the interferometric array. The comparatively small secondary mirror is 2.74 m in diameter, which will serve active corrections. Other characteristics include:

1. Partial annular submirrors
2. One of coude planar mirrors is aspherical; better image quality is obtained from such a system.
3. A pair of lens-prisms are used in a wide field of view system. Better image quality is obtained and atmospheric dispersion is corrected.

== See also ==
- Thirty Meter Telescope
- Lists of telescopes
