= Rosie Alegado =

Hawaiian microbial oceanographer

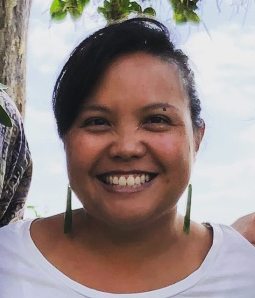
- Rosie Alegado, 2018
- Born: 1978 (age 47–48); Honolulu, Hawaiʻi
- Other name: Rosanna Alegado
- Education: MIT; Stanford University Medical School
- Known for: choanoflagellates
- Scientific career
- Fields: Biology, Microbiology, Oceanography
- Institutions: University of Hawaiʻi at Mānoa
- Website: mee-hawaii-lab.org

Rosanna "Rosie" ʻAnolani Alegado is a Kanaka ʻōiwi/Native Hawaiian Professor of Oceanography at the Daniel K. Inouye Center for Microbial Oceanography as well as director of the Hawaiʻi Sea Grant's Ulana 'Ike Center of Excellence at the University of Hawaiʻi at Mānoa. Alegado studies the evolution of host–microbe interactions and the microbial ecology of coastal estuarine systems.

== Early life ==
Alegado was born in Honolulu, Hawaiʻi. Her mother is Native Hawaiian scholar and activist Davianna Pōmaika'i McGregor, professor and founding member of the Department of Ethnic Studies at the University of Hawaiʻi at Mānoa. Her father was Filipino scholar and activist Dean Alegado, a former professor of Ethnic Studies at the University of Hawaiʻi at Mānoa and leader of the Union of Democratic Filipinos (Katipunan ng Demokratikong Pilipino, KDP) founded in 1973.

She graduated from the Kamehameha Schools. Alegado earned a BS in Biology and with a Minor in Environmental Health and Toxicology at the Massachusetts Institute of Technology, and a PhD in Microbiology and Immunology at Stanford University School of Medicine.

== Career ==
When Alegado was hired in the Department of Oceanography, she became the first Kanaka ʻŌiwi to be appointed to a tenure-track position in the department as well as the School of Ocean and Earth Science and Technology at the University of Hawaiʻi. She was hired as part of multi-disciplinary initiative in Coastal Resilience and Sustainability, under Chancellor Prof Virginia Hinshaw. This initiative aims to support research that promotes sustainable management of coastal regions of Hawaii. In 2018, Alegado became director of the Sea Grant Ulana 'Ike Center of Excellence, established by Hawaiʻi Sea Grant a year prior to "implement and perpetuate the cultural knowledge of Hawaiʻi and the Pacific Islands to current science and research". She took up the helm after the previous director, Prof Puakea Nogelmeier, retired.

== Research ==
Alegado completed her graduate work with Man-Wah Tan where she characterized the bacterial pathogenesis of Salmonella typhimurium in the model organism C. elegans. She then shifted her focus to evolution of host-microbe interactions during her postdoctoral fellowship with Nicole King at UC Berkeley, researching multicellular development in the closest living relatives of animals, the colonial choanoflagellate Salpingoeca rosetta. She found that exposure to Bacteroidota bacteria triggers choanoflagellate colony formation, and narrowed down the molecular mechanism to a single sulfonolipid, offering a tantalising theory as to how the evolution of animals was influenced by bacteria. Alegado also helped to establish the choanoflagellate as a model system by defining its developmental cycle.

Alegado investigates the role of microbial communities in ocean nutrient recycling, and how ocean dynamics have impacted the communities of Hawaii. She continues to study choanoflagellates, predominantly local Hawaiian strains, and aims to identify the role of choanoflagellate community formation in food webs of aquatic ecosystems. Alegado has investigated the oceanic factors which influence fish yield from the traditional Hawaiian fishpond stewarded by Paepae o Heʻeia, concluding that El Niño had a major effect and that this may become more frequent with global climate change. The state of the local ecosystem also saw improvements in water quality when the introduced mangrove species Rhizophora mangle were removed through biocultural restoration. Currently her group is investigating how native people were able to avoid fish casualties due to El Nino in the past by trawling literature from the native language. She recently announced a project to investigate how microbial communities have adapted to the introduction of non-native mangrove forests around Hawaiʻi, comparing newer communities to those which have been more established.

== Indigenous culture ==
Alegado is committed to the perpetuation of Native Hawaiian cultural practices and to fostering collaboration of scientists working on the islands with the native people. She works with the non-profit organisation Kuaʻāina Ulu ʻAuamo to establish a process, known as 'kūlana noiʻi', which helps "researchers build and sustain equitable partnerships with the community". In her own lab, Alegado mentors her students to embrace the concept of Aloha ʻĀina (love for that which feeds/the land). She works to protect the islands, native people and their well-being from the effects of climate change, described as a further wave of colonisation. Alegado has been a member of the Honolulu City and County Climate Change Commission since 2018.

Alegado is also the director of the SOEST Maile Mentoring Bridge Program, which fosters Hawaii community college students to major in the geosciences. To mark the graduation of these students, she implemented workshops with native craftsmen and students to design traditional kīhei to wear during graduation.

=== Thirty Meter Telescope ===
Alegado opposes the construction of the Thirty Meter Telescope on Mauna Kea, since it represents a continuing infringement on native lands, and has spoken out about the issue to the media. She has written to counter the idea that the native Hawaiian culture is acting 'anti-science', describing how the local philosophies that hold the mountain sacred are based on concepts of environmental protection, and stating that it is dangerous for science to continue unbounded by ethics, anti-colonialism and respect. Alegado and other Native Hawaiian academics wrote a paper in ArXiv which detailed the local case against the telescope and how to improve relations between indigenous people and astronomy.
