= Puʻu Huluhulu =

Volcanic cone in the Island of Hawaii

Coordinates: 19°41′15″N 155°28′01″W

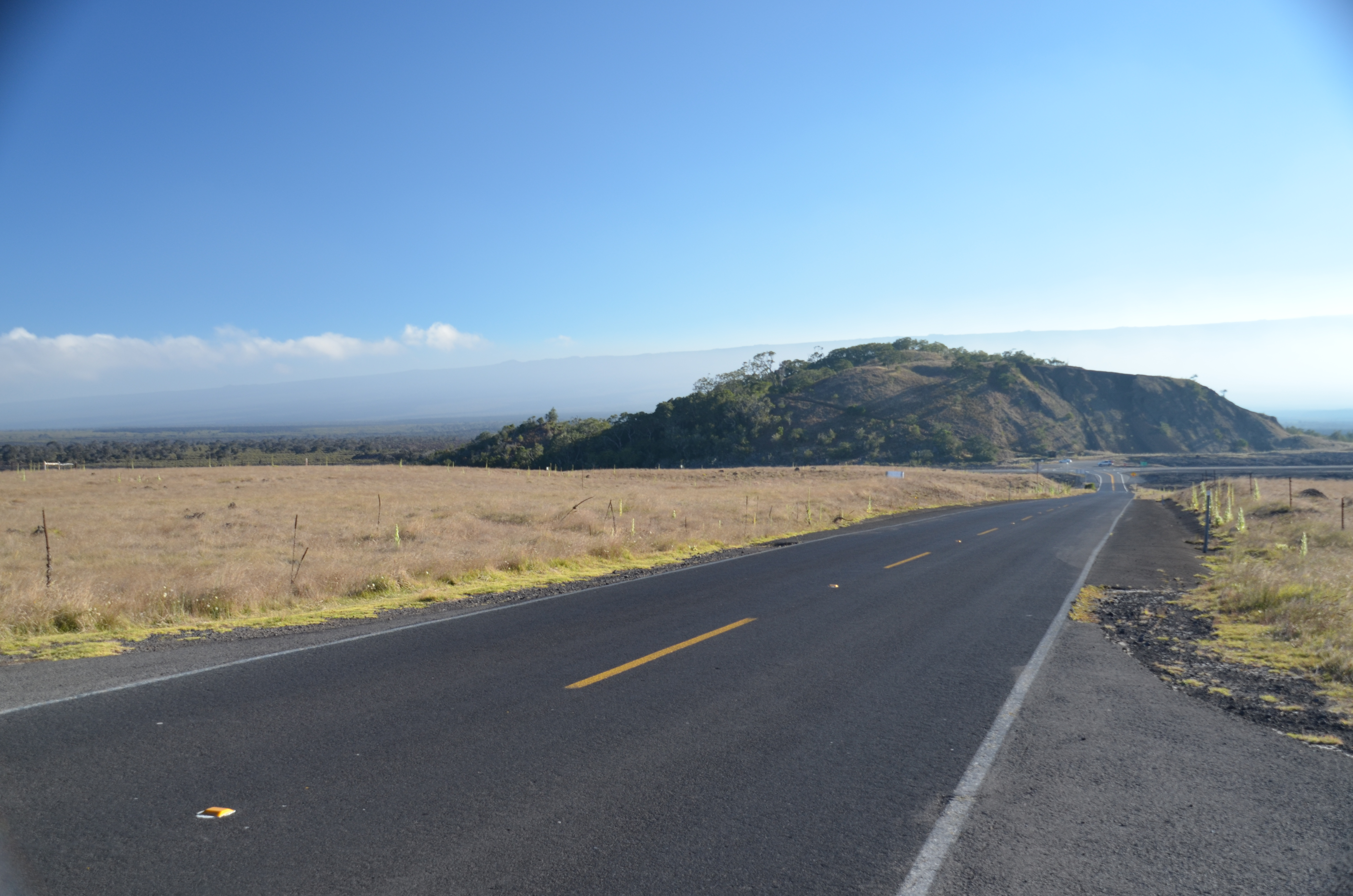
Puu Huluhulu as seen from the Mauna Kea road

Puʻu Huluhulu is a volcanic cone located near the center of the Island of Hawaii in the State of Hawaii. It is located on the southern side of Hawaii Route 200 (Daniel K. Inouye Highway, also known locally as Saddle Road), directly across from the highway's intersection with the Mauna Kea Access Road. Puʻu Huluhulu is Hawaiian for hairy hill (puʻu=hill and huluhulu=hairy).

The cone is a kīpuka, which is an older volcanic hill covered with vegetation, surrounded by the younger lava flow. The hill is located on Hawaii Route 200 and is a native tree sanctuary and a nature trail.

Beginning in July 2019, various groups opposed to the Thirty Meter Telescope gathered at Puʻu Huluhulu to block Mauna Kea Access Road and temporarily stop its construction, despite the Hawaii Supreme Court's ruling to allow construction to move forward.

== Gallery ==
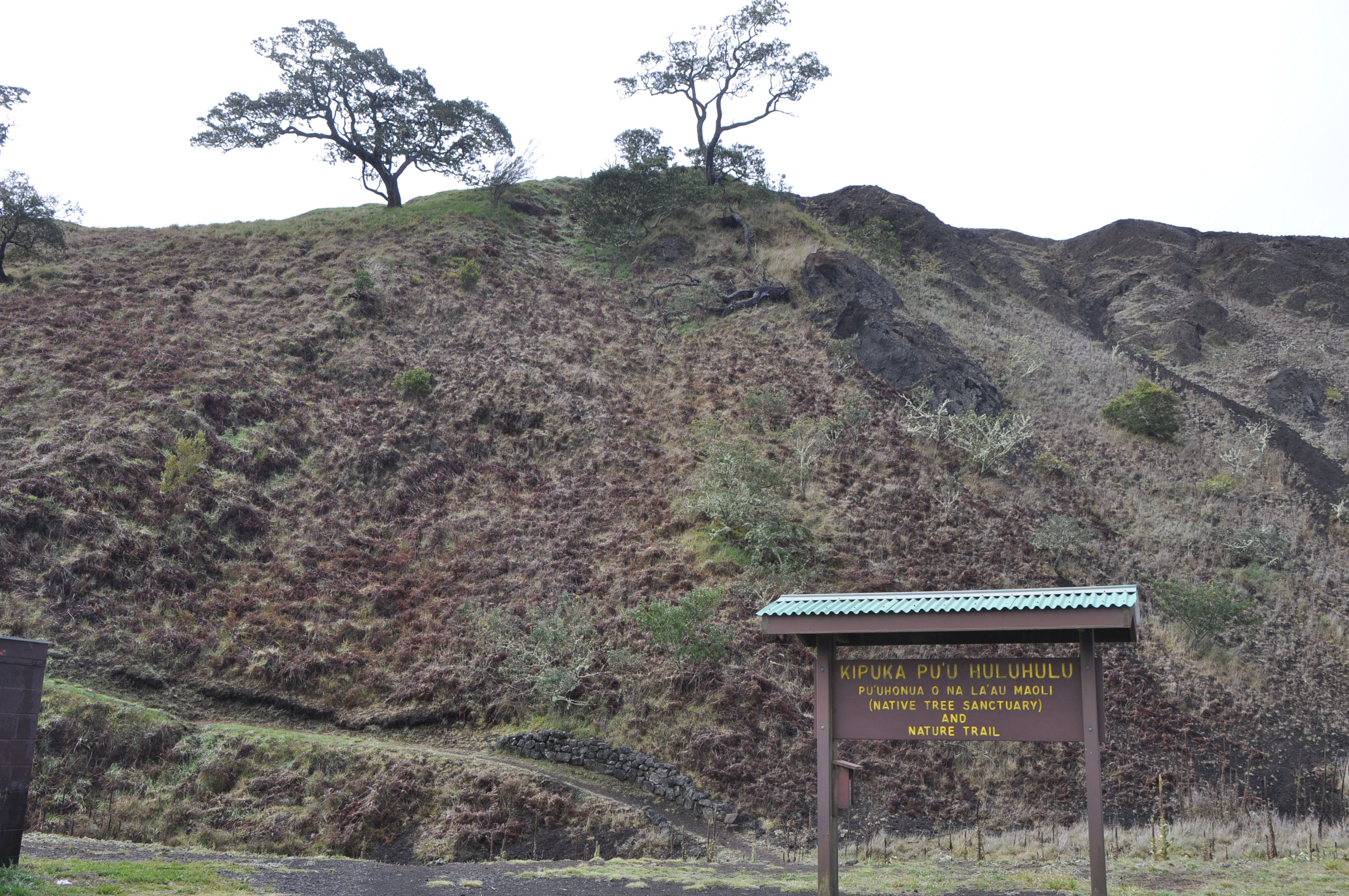
Puu Huluhulu, a sacred place for the Native Hawaiians

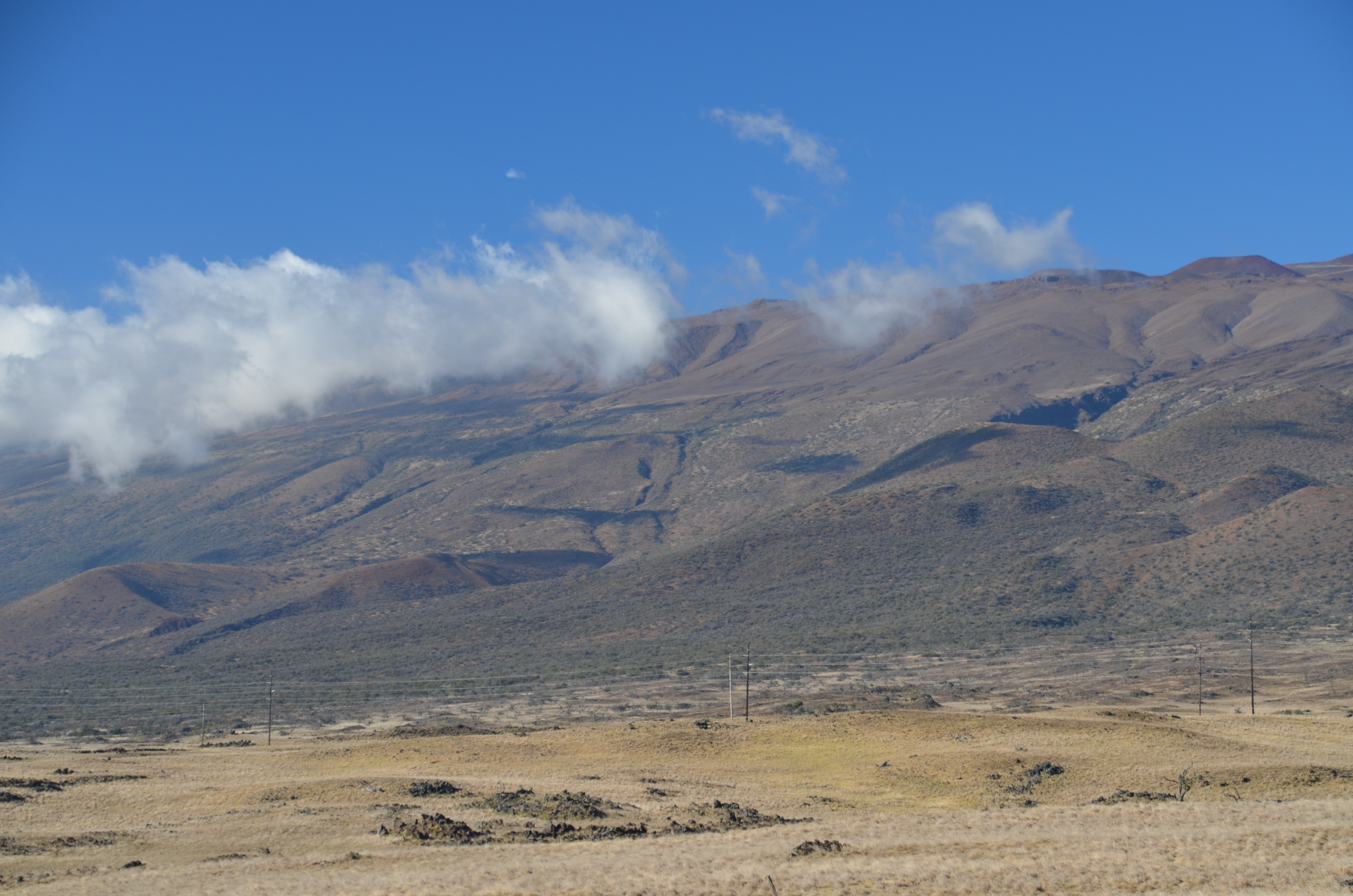
Mauna Kea as viewed from Puu Huluhulu

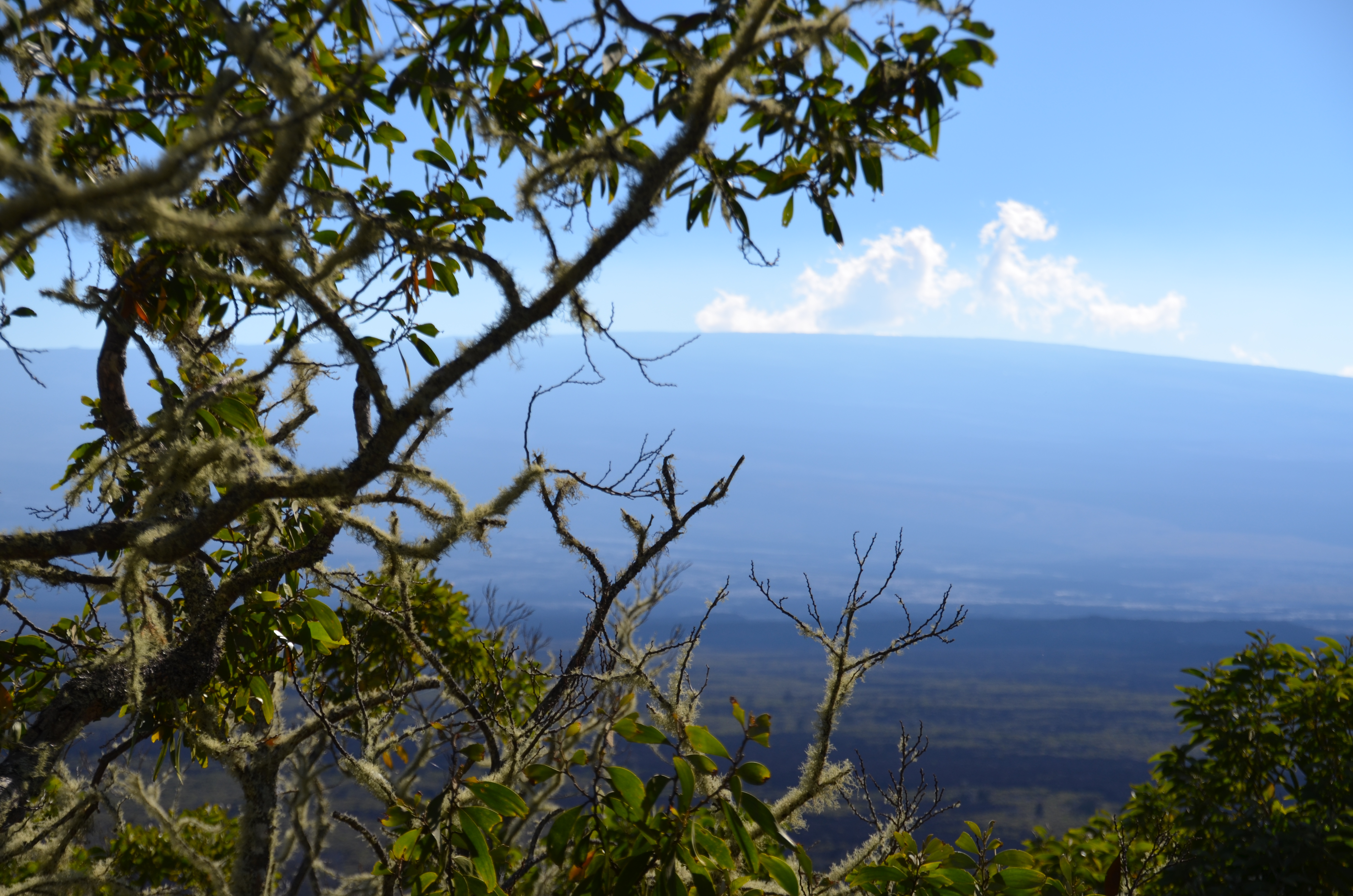
Mauna Loa as viewed from Puu Huluhulu

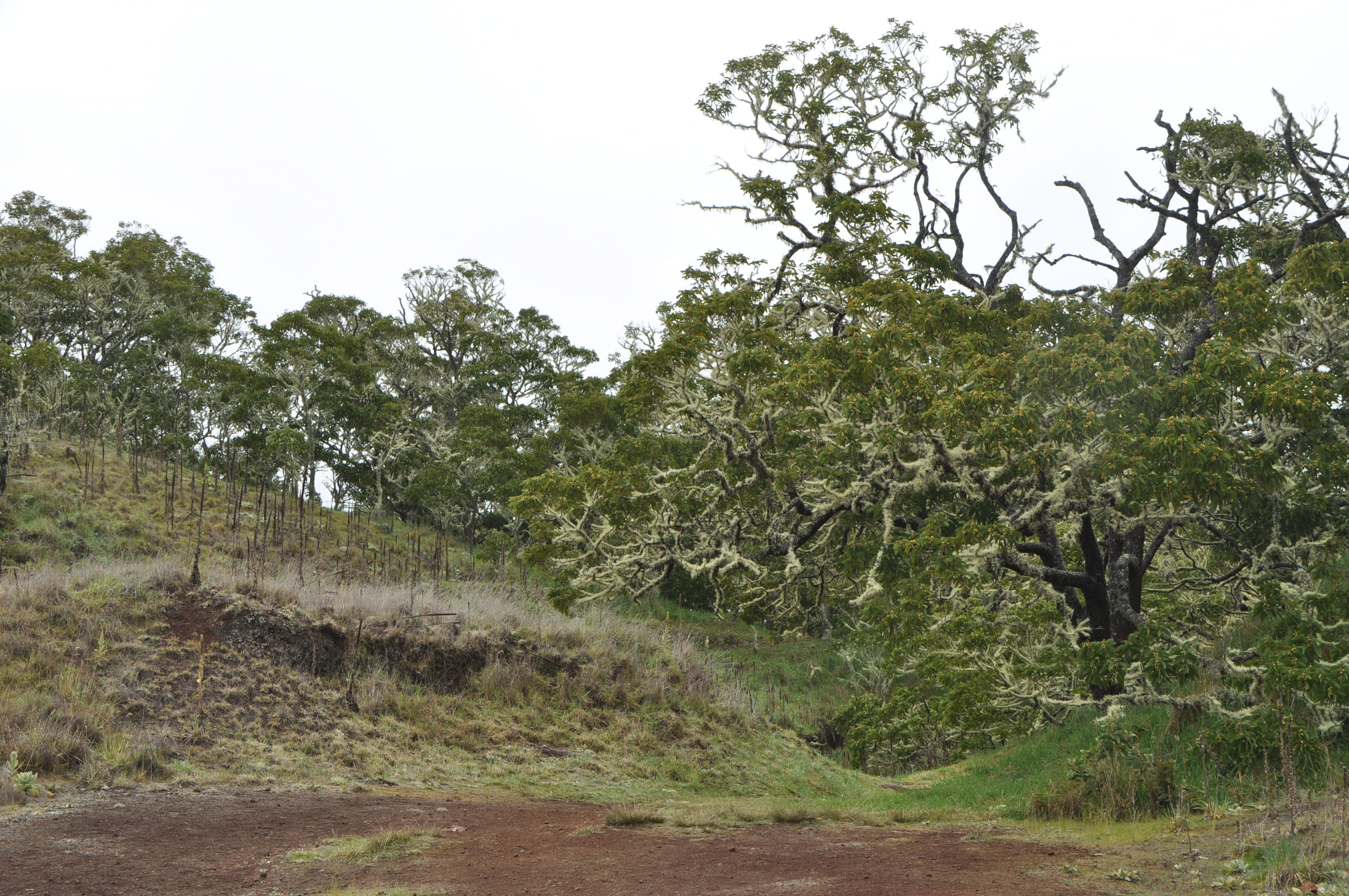
Koa and other native Hawaiian vegetation are preserved here.

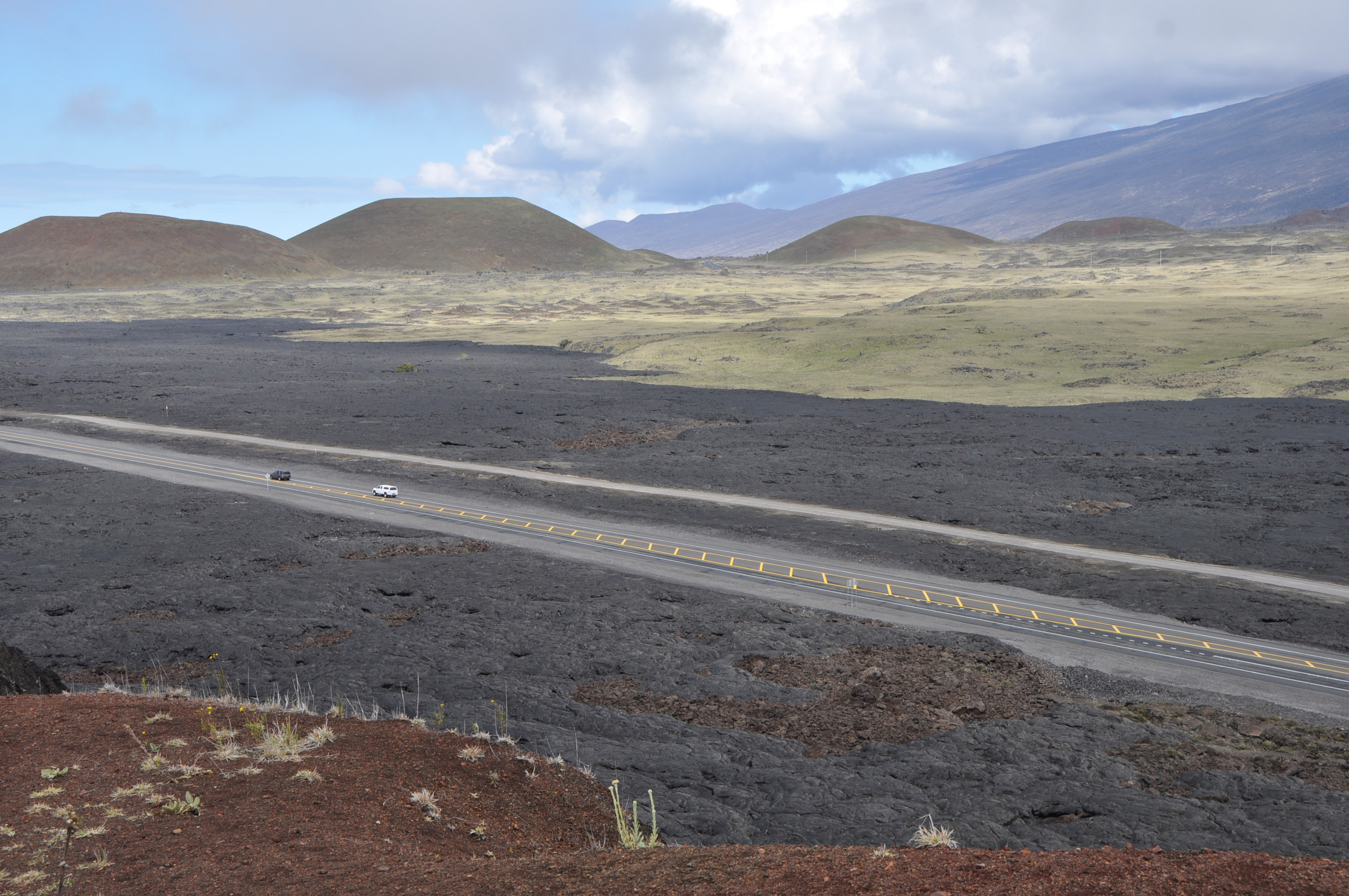
A view toward northwest, showing lava plateau and cinder cones

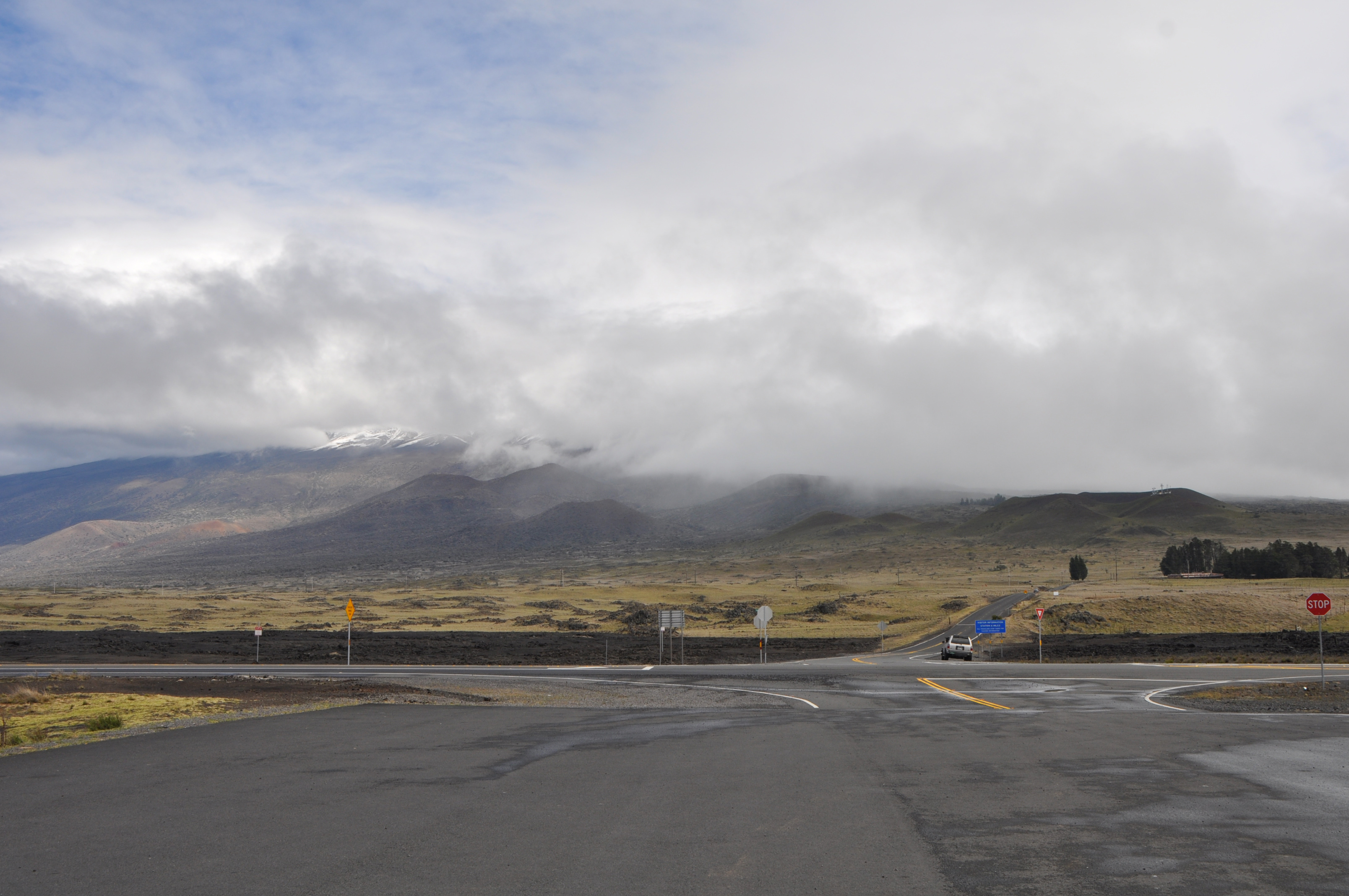
The entrance to the Mauna Kea access road for the Onizuka Center for International Astronomy and Mauna Kea Observatories.
