= Nasmyth telescope =

Three-mirror telescope design

Simple Nasmyth telescope

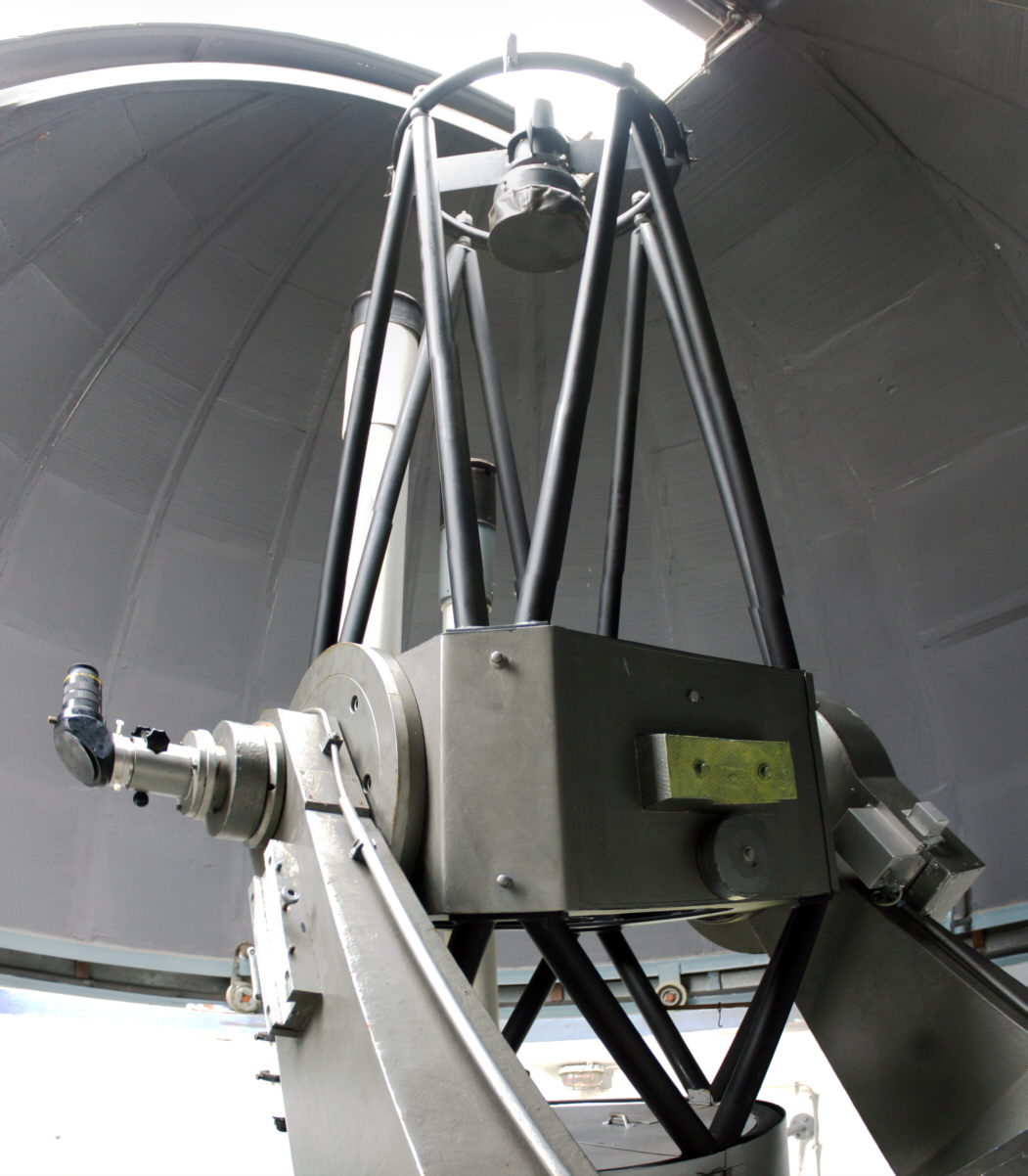
56cm Nasmyth-Cassegrain Telescope at the Walter-Hohmann-Observatory in Essen, Germany

The Nasmyth telescope, also called Nasmyth–Cassegrain or Cassegrain–Nasmyth, is a reflecting telescope developed by the Scottish inventor James Nasmyth in 1845. It is a modified form of a Cassegrain reflector, with light reflected sideways to an eyepiece.

== Scheme ==
As in the Cassegrain telescope, the light falls on a concave primary mirror, then is reflected towards a convex secondary mirror. A comparatively small tertiary flat mirror reflects the light to one of the sides of the telescope. (The central hole in the primary mirror may still host a Cassegrain focus if the tertiary can be moved out of the way.) This flat mirror is placed on the altitude axis, so that the beam exits through a hole in the middle of the altitude bearing. This means the eyepiece or instrument does not need to move up and down with the telescope as the tertiary mirror's angle with the main telescope axis is adjustable as a function of the telescope's pointing and the star's elevation above the horizon; therefore a heavy instrument can be used without upsetting the balance of the telescope or increasing the load on the altitude bearings. This has significant advantages for spectrographs and other heavy instruments typically used at research observatories. Most modern research telescopes can be configured into a Nasmyth telescope (i.e. to use the "Nasmyth Focus").

== Observatories ==
The twin 10-meter telescopes at W. M. Keck Observatory in Hawaii, the 8.2-meter Subaru Telescope sited next to them, the four 8.2-meter Unit Telescopes of ESO's Very Large Telescope and their predecessor the 3.6-meter New Technology Telescope are notable examples that support an array of specialized instruments on their Nasmyth platforms, with a similar design being used for the future Thirty Meter Telescope and Extremely Large Telescope. The 2.4-meter Automated Planet Finder telescope at Lick Observatory in California supports the use of two Nasmyth foci. The Sierra Nevada Observatory (OSN) in Spain has two Nasmyth telescopes, including a 1.5-meter diameter aperture one. The SOFIA airborne telescope also uses this design.

== See also ==
- Cassegrain antenna
- List of telescope types
- List of astronomical observatories
