= Kīpuka =

Area of land surrounded by one or more younger lava flows

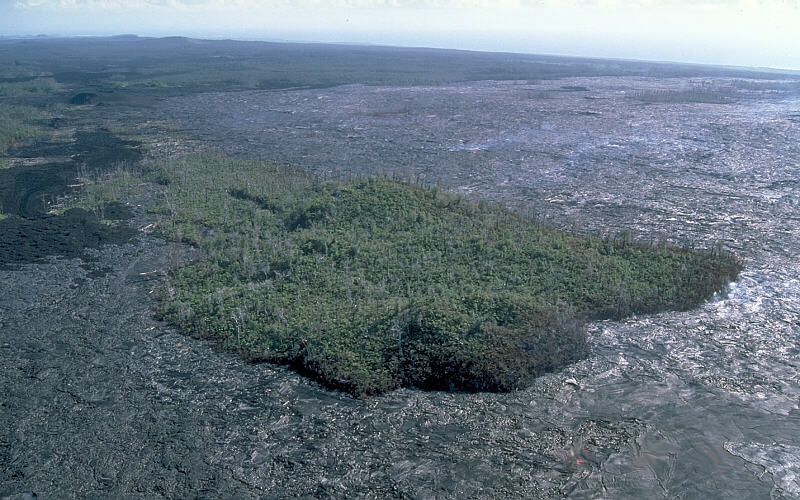
A kīpuka surrounded by lava flows at Kīlauea volcano, Hawai`i

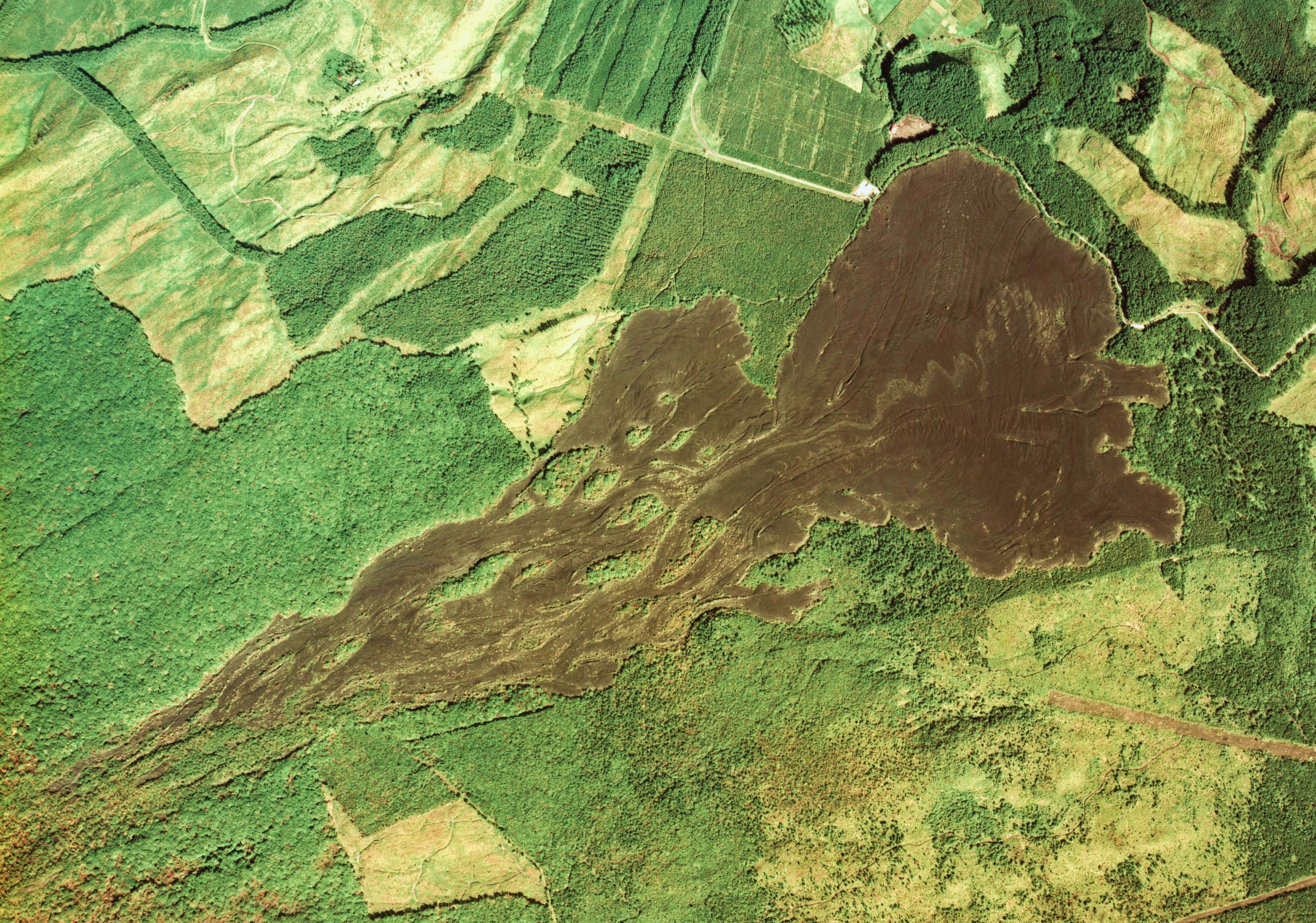
Green kīpukas surrounded by brown lava flows erupted from Iwate volcano, Japan

A kīpuka is an area of land surrounded by one or more younger lava flows. A kīpuka forms when lava flows on either side of a hill, ridge, or older lava dome as it moves downslope or spreads from its source. Older and more weathered than their surroundings, kīpukas often appear to be like islands within a sea of lava flows. They are often covered with soil and late ecological successional vegetation that provide visual contrast as well as habitat for animals in an otherwise inhospitable environment. In volcanic landscapes, kīpukas play an important role as biological reservoirs or refugia for plants and animals, from which the covered land can be recolonized.

== Etymology ==
Kīpuka, along with ʻaʻā and pāhoehoe, are Hawaiian words related to volcanology that have entered the lexicon of geology. Descriptive proverbs and poetical sayings in Hawaiian oral tradition also use the word, in an allusive sense, to mean a place where life or culture endures, regardless of any encroachment or interference. By extension, from the appearance of island "patches" within a highly contrasted background, any similarly noticeable variation or change of form, such as an opening in a forest, or a clear place in a congested setting, may be colloquially called kīpuka.

== Significance to research ==
Kīpuka provides useful study sites for ecological research because they facilitate replication; multiple kīpuka in a system (isolated by the same lava flow) will tend to have uniform substrate age and successional characteristics, but are often isolated-enough from their neighbors to provide meaningful, comparable differences in size, invasion, etc. They are also receptive to experimental treatments. Kīpuka along Saddle Road on Hawaiʻi have served as the natural laboratory for a variety of studies, examining ecological principles like island biogeography, food web control, and biotic resistance to invasiveness. In addition, Drosophila silvestris populations inhabit kīpukas, making kīpukas useful for understanding the fragmented population structure and reproductive isolation of this fly species.

== See also ==
- Puʻu Huluhulu – Volcanic cone in the Island of Hawaii
