= Thirty Meter Telescope =

Future observatory in the United States

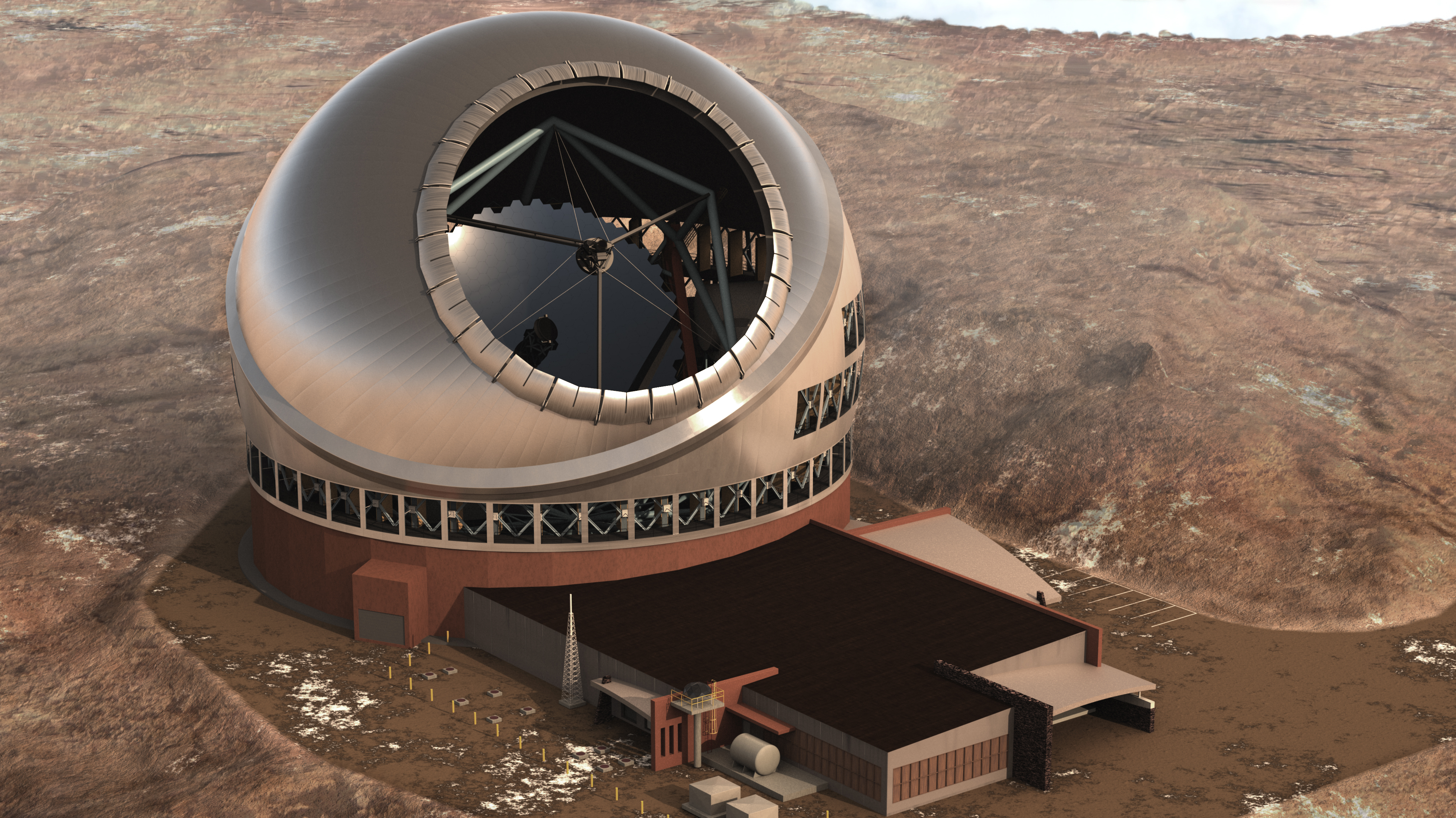
- Artist's rendering
- Alternative names: TMT
- Location: Maunakea Observatories, Hawaiʻi County, Hawaii
- Coordinates: 19°49′58″N 155°28′54″W
- Organization: TMT International Observatory
- Altitude: 4,050 m (13,290 ft)
- Wavelength: Near UV, visible, and Mid-IR (0.31–28 μm)
- Built: Construction began 2014, halted since 2015
- First light: TBD, possibly never
- Telescope style: Ritchey–Chrétien telescope
- Diameter: 30 m (98 ft)
- Secondary diameter: 3.1 m (10 ft)
- Tertiary diameter: 2.5 m × 3.5 m (8.2 ft × 11.5 ft)
- Mass: 2,650 t (2,650,000 kg)
- Collecting area: 655 m^{2} (7,050 sq ft)
- Focal length: f/15 (450 metres [1,480 ft])
- Mounting: Altazimuth mount
- Enclosure: Spherical calotte
- Website: TMT.org
- Location within Hawaii
- Related media on Commons

The Thirty Meter Telescope (TMT) is a proposal for an extremely large telescope (ELT), intended to be built on Mauna Kea, on the island of Hawai'i.

Scientists have been considering ELTs since the mid-1980s. In 2000, astronomers considered the possibility of a telescope with a light-gathering mirror larger than 20 meters (66 ft) in diameter, using either small segments that create one large mirror, or a grouping of larger 8-meter (26 ft) mirrors working as one unit. The US National Academy of Sciences recommended a 30-meter (98 ft) telescope be the focus of US interests, seeking to see it built within the decade.

Scientists at the University of California, Santa Cruz, and Caltech began development of a design that would eventually become the TMT, consisting of a 492-segment primary mirror with nine times the power of the Keck Observatory. Due to its light-gathering power and the optimal observing conditions which exist atop Mauna Kea, the TMT would enable astronomers to conduct research which is infeasible with current instruments. The TMT is designed for near-ultraviolet to mid-infrared (0.31 to 28 μm wavelengths) observations, featuring adaptive optics to assist in correcting image blur. The TMT would be at the highest altitude of all the proposed ELTs.

The proposed location on Mauna Kea has been controversial among the Native Hawaiian community and spawned a series of protests. Demonstrations attracted press coverage after October 2014, when construction was temporarily halted due to a blockade of the roadway. When construction of the telescope was set to resume, construction was blocked by further protests each time. In 2015, Governor David Ige announced several changes to the management of Mauna Kea, including a requirement that the TMT's site will be the last new site on Mauna Kea to be developed for a telescope. The Board of Land and Natural Resources approved the TMT project, but the Supreme Court of Hawaii invalidated the building permits in December 2015, ruling that the board had not followed due process. In October 2018, the Court approved the resumption of construction; however, no further construction has occurred due to continued opposition. In July 2023, a new state-appointed oversight board, which includes Native Hawaiian community representatives and cultural practitioners, began a five-year transition to assume management over Mauna Kea and its telescope sites, which may be a path forward. In April 2024, TMT's project manager apologized for the organization having "contributed to division in the community", and stated that TMT's approach to construction in Hawai'i is "very different now from TMT in 2019." An alternate site for the Thirty Meter Telescope has been proposed for La Palma, Canary Islands, Spain, but is considered less scientifically favorable by astronomers.

In June 2025 the United States' National Science Foundation dropped support for the TMT in favor of the Giant Magellan Telescope. This lack of funding puts the TMT's future in doubt, although the scientists in the TMT international consortium said they would press forward.

== Background ==
In 2000, astronomers began considering the potential of telescopes larger than 20 meters (66 ft) in diameter. The technology to build a mirror larger than 8.4 meters (28 ft) does not exist; instead scientists considered two methods: either segmented smaller mirrors as used in the Keck Observatory, or a group of 8-meter (26') mirrors mounted to form a single unit. The US National Academy of Sciences made a suggestion that a 30-meter (98 ft) telescope should be the focus of US astronomy interests and recommended that it be built within the decade.

The University of California, along with Caltech, began development of a 30-meter telescope that same year. The California Extremely Large Telescope (CELT) began development, along with the Giant Segmented Mirror Telescope (GSMT), and the Very Large Optical Telescope (VLOT). These studies would eventually define the Thirty Meter Telescope. The TMT would have nine times the collecting area of the older Keck telescope using slightly smaller mirror segments in a vastly larger group. Another telescope of a large diameter in the works is the Extremely Large Telescope (ELT) being built in northern Chile.

The telescope is designed for observations from near-ultraviolet to mid-infrared (0.31 to 28 μm wavelengths). In addition, its adaptive optics system will help correct for image blur caused by the atmosphere of the Earth, helping it to reach the potential of such a large mirror. Among existing and planned extremely large telescopes, the TMT will have the highest elevation and will be the second-largest telescope once the ELT is built. Both use segments of small 1.44 metres (4 ft 9 in) hexagonal mirrors—a design vastly different from the large mirrors of the Large Binocular Telescope (LBT) or the Giant Magellan Telescope (GMT). Each night, the TMT would collect 90 terabytes of data. The TMT has government-level support from the following countries: Canada, Japan and India. The United States is also contributing some funding, but less than the formal partnership.

=== Proposed locations ===
A world map of proposed Thirty Meter Telescope sites – orange denotes lights, blue denotes elevation (land and water separately)

In cooperation with AURA, the TMT project completed a multi-year evaluation of six sites:

- Roque de los Muchachos Observatory, La Palma, Canary Islands, Spain
- Cerro Armazones, Antofagasta Region, Republic of Chile
- Cerro Tolanchar, Antofagasta Region, Republic of Chile
- Cerro Tolar, Antofagasta Region, Republic of Chile
- Mauna Kea, Hawaii, United States (This site was chosen and approval was granted in April 2013)
- San Pedro Mártir, Baja California, Mexico
- Hanle, Ladakh, India

The TMT Observatory Corporation board of directors narrowed the list to two sites, one in each hemisphere, for further consideration: Cerro Armazones in Chile's Atacama Desert and Mauna Kea on Hawaii Island. On July 21, 2009, the TMT board announced Mauna Kea as the preferred site. The final TMT site selection decision was based on a combination of scientific, financial, and political criteria. Chile is also where the European Southern Observatory is building the ELT. If both next-generation telescopes were in the same hemisphere, there would be many astronomical objects that neither could observe. The telescope was given approval by the state Board of Land and Natural Resources in April 2013.

There has been opposition to the building of the telescope, based on potential disruption to the fragile alpine environment of Mauna Kea due to construction, traffic, and noise, which is a concern for the habitat of several species, and because Mauna Kea is a sacred site for the Native Hawaiian culture. The Hawaii Board of Land and Natural Resources conditionally approved the Mauna Kea site for the TMT in February 2011. The approval has been challenged; however, the Board officially approved the site following a hearing on February 12, 2013.

=== Partnerships and funding ===
The Gordon and Betty Moore Foundation has committed US$200 million for construction. Caltech and the University of California have committed an additional US$50 million each. Japan, which has its own large telescope at Mauna Kea, the 8.3-meter (27 ft) Subaru, is also a partner.

In 2008, the National Astronomical Observatory of Japan (NAOJ) joined TMT as a collaborator institution. The following year, the telescope cost was estimated to be $970 million to $1.4 billion. That same year, the National Astronomical Observatories of the Chinese Academy of Sciences (NAOC) joined TMT as an observer. The observer status is the first step in becoming a full partner in the construction of the TMT and participating in the engineering development and scientific use of the observatory. By 2024, China was not a partner in TMT.

In 2010, a consortium of Indian Astronomy Research Institutes (IIA, IUCAA and ARIES) joined TMT as an observer, subject to approval of funding from the Indian government. Two years later, India and China became partners with representatives on the TMT board. Both countries agreed to share the telescope construction costs, expected to top $1 billion. India became a full member of the TMT consortium in 2014. In 2019 the India-based company Larsen & Toubro (L&T) were awarded the contract to build the segment support assembly (SSA), which "are complex optomechanical sub-assemblies on which each hexagonal mirror of the 30-metre primary mirror, the heart of the telescope, is mounted".

The IndiaTMT Optics Fabricating Facility (ITOFF) will be constructed at the Indian Institute of Astrophysics campus in the city of Hosakote, near Bengaluru. India will supply 80 of the 492 mirror segments for the TMT. A.N. Ramaprakash, the associate programme director of India-TMT, stated; "All sensors, actuators and SSAs for the whole telescope are being developed and manufactured in India, which will be put together in building the heart of TMT", also adding; "Since it is for the first time that India is involved in such a technically demanding astronomy project, it is also an opportunity to put to test the abilities of Indian scientists and industries, alike."

The continued financial commitment from the Canadian government had been in doubt due to economic pressures. In April 2015, Prime Minister Stephen Harper announced that Canada would commit $243.5 million over a period of 10 years. The telescope's unique enclosure was designed by Dynamic Structures Ltd. in British Columbia. In a 2019 online petition, a group of Canadian academics called on succeeding Canadian Prime Minister Justin Trudeau together with Industry Minister Navdeep Bains and Science Minister Kirsty Duncan to divest Canadian funding from the project. As of September 2020, the Canadian astronomy community has named TMT its top facility priority for the decade ahead.

== Design ==
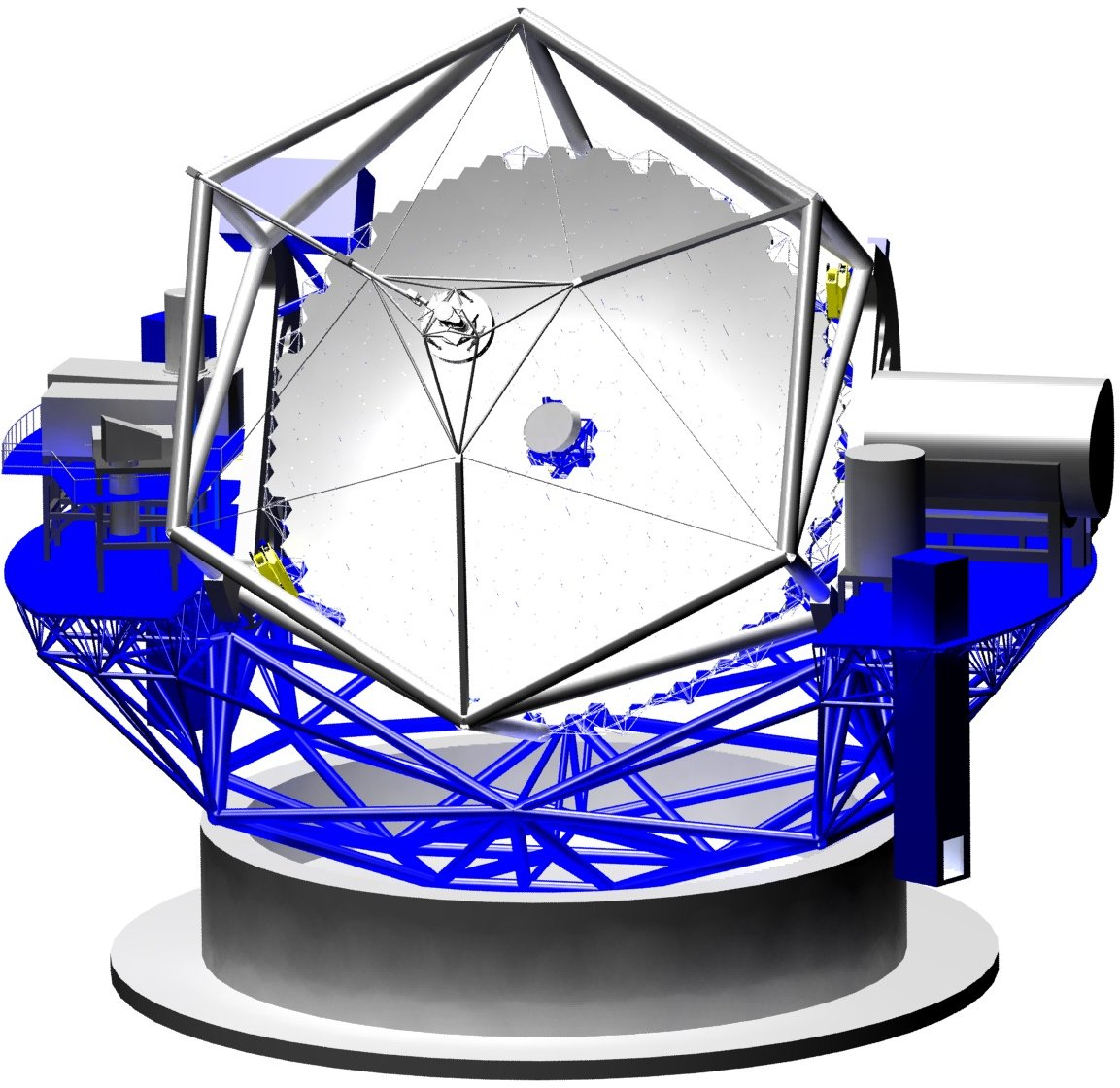
The Thirty Meter Telescope design, late 2007

The TMT would be housed in a general-purpose observatory capable of investigating a broad range of astrophysical problems. The total diameter of the dome will be 217 feet (66 m) with the total dome height at 180 feet (55 m) (comparable in height to an eighteen-storey building). The total area of the structure is projected to be 1.44 acres (0.58 ha) within a 5-acre (2.0 ha) complex.

=== Telescope ===
The centerpiece of the TMT Observatory is to be a Ritchey-Chrétien telescope with a 30-metre (98 ft) diameter primary mirror. This mirror is to be segmented and consist of 492 smaller (1.4 meters; 4 ft 7 in), individual hexagonal mirrors. The shape of each segment, as well as its position relative to neighboring segments, will be controlled actively.

A 3.1-metre (10 ft) secondary mirror is to produce an unobstructed field-of-view of 20 arcminutes in diameter with a focal ratio of 15. A 3.5-by-2.5-meter (11.5 ft × 8.2 ft) flat tertiary mirror is to direct the light path to science instruments mounted on large Nasmyth platforms. The telescope is to have an alt-azimuth mount. Target acquisition and system configuration capabilities need to be achieved within 5 minutes, or ten minutes if relocating to a newer device. To achieve these time limitations the TMT will use a software architecture linked by a service based communications system. The moving mass of the telescope, optics, and instruments will be about 1,420 tonnes (1,400 long tons; 1,570 short tons). The design of the facility descends from the Keck Observatory.

=== Adaptive optics ===
Mirror sizes of existing and proposed telescopes. The two other new extremely large telescopes, the ELT and GMT are being built in the southern hemisphere

Integral to the observatory is a Multi-Conjugate Adaptive Optics (MCAO) system. This MCAO system will measure atmospheric turbulence by observing a combination of natural (real) stars and artificial laser guide stars. Based on these measurements, a pair of deformable mirrors will be adjusted many times per second to correct optical wave-front distortions caused by the intervening turbulence.

This system will produce diffraction-limited images over a 30-arc-second diameter field-of-view, which means that the core of the point spread function will have a size of 0.015 arc-second at a wavelength of 2.2 micrometers, almost ten times better than the Hubble Space Telescope.

=== Scientific instrumentation ===
==== Early-light capabilities ====
Three instruments are planned to be available for scientific observations:

- Wide Field Optical Spectrometer (WFOS) provides a seeing limit that goes down to the ultraviolet with optical (0.3–1.0 μm wavelength) imaging and spectroscopy capable of 40-square arc-minute field-of-view. The TMT will use precision cut focal plane masks and enable long-slit observations of individual objects as well as short-slit observations of hundreds of different objects at the same time. The spectrometer will use natural (uncorrected) seeing images.
- Infrared Imaging Spectrometer (IRIS) mounted on the observatory MCAO system, capable of diffraction-limited imaging and integral-field spectroscopy at near-infrared wavelengths (0.8–2.5 μm). Principal investigators are James Larkin of UCLA and Anna Moore of Caltech. Project scientist is Shelley Wright of UC San Diego.
- Infrared Multi-object Spectrometer (IRMS) allowing close to diffraction-limited imaging and slit spectroscopy over a 2 arc-minute diameter field-of-view at near-infrared wavelengths (0.8–2.5 μm).

== Approval process and protests ==
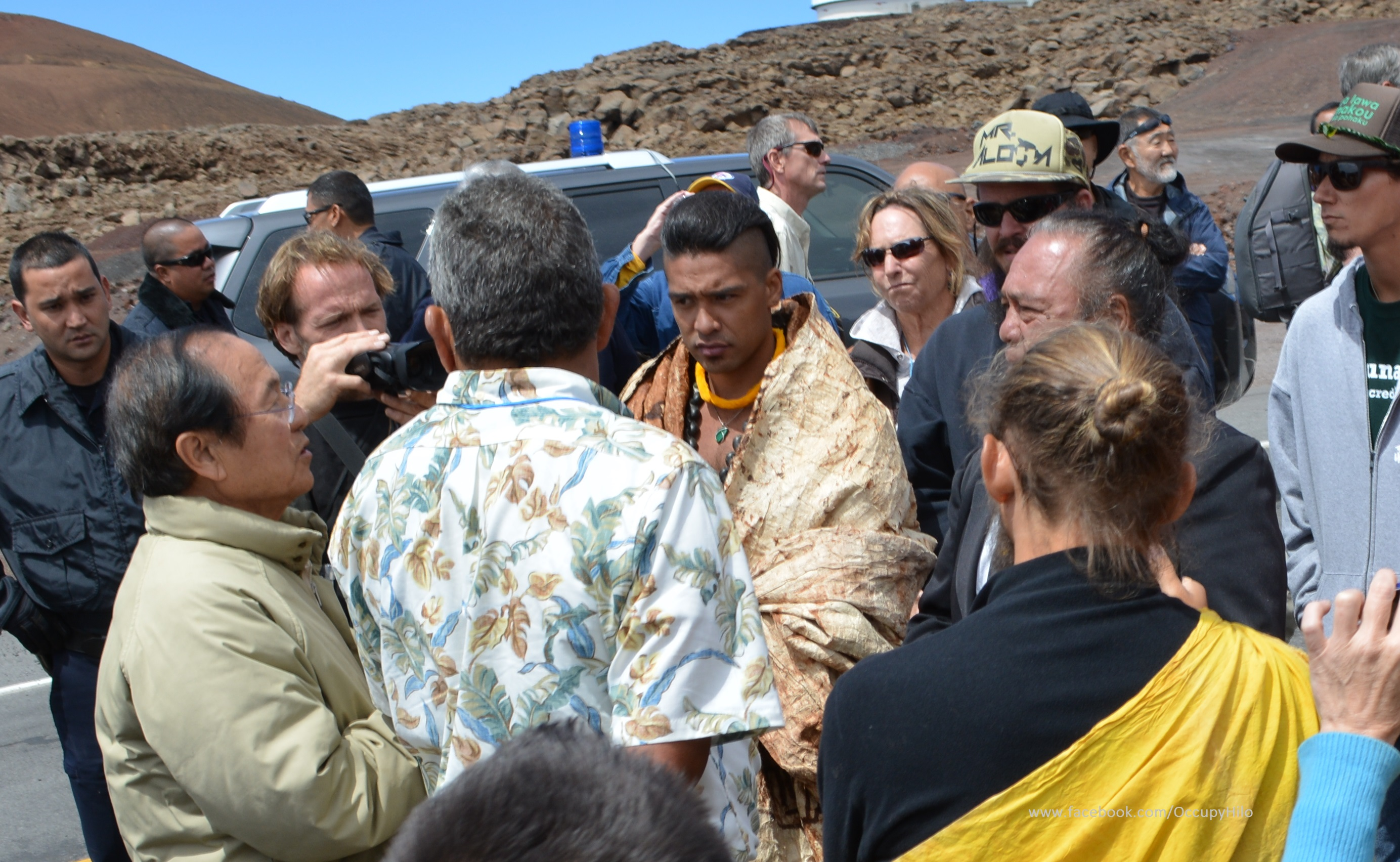
Cultural practitioner Joshua Lanakila Mangauil, along with Kahoʻokahi Kanuha and Hawaiian sovereignty supporters block the access road to Mauna Kea in October 2014, demonstrating against the building of the Thirty Meter Telescope.

In 2008, the TMT corporation selected two semi-finalists for further study, Mauna Kea and Cerro Amazones. In July 2009, Mauna Kea was selected. Once TMT selected Mauna Kea, the project began a regulatory and community process for approval. Mauna Kea is ranked as one of the best sites on Earth for telescope viewing and is home to 13 other telescopes built at the summit of the mountain, within the Mauna Kea Observatories grounds. Telescopes generate money for the big island, with millions of dollars in jobs and subsidies gained by the state. The TMT would be one of the most expensive telescopes ever created.

However, the proposed construction of the TMT on Mauna Kea sparked protests and demonstrations across the state of Hawaii. Mauna Kea is the most sacred mountain in Hawaiian culture as well as conservation land held in trust by the state of Hawaii.

=== 2010-2014: Initial approval, permit and contested case hearing ===
In 2010 Governor Linda Lingle of the State of Hawaii signed off on an environmental study after 14 community meetings. The BLNR held hearings on December 2 and December 3, 2010, on the application for a permit.

On February 25, 2011, the board granted the permits after multiple public hearings. This approval had conditions, in particular, that a hearing about contesting the approval be heard. A contested case hearing was held in August 2011, which led to a judgment by the hearing officer for approval in November 2012. The telescope was given approval by the state Board of Land and Natural Resources in April 2013. This process was challenged in court with a lower court ruling in May 2014. The Intermediate Court of Appeals of the State of Hawaii declined to hear an appeal regarding the permit until the Hawaii Department of Land and Natural Resources first issued a decision from the contested case hearing that could then be appealed to the court.

=== 2014-2015: First blockade, construction halts, State Supreme Court invalidates permit ===
The dedication and ground-breaking ceremony was held, but interrupted by protesters on October 7, 2014. The project became the focal point of escalating political conflict, police arrests and continued litigation over the proper use of conservation lands. Native Hawaiian cultural practice and religious rights became central to the opposition, with concerns over the lack of meaningful dialogue during the permitting process. In late March 2015, demonstrators again halted the construction crews. On April 2, 2015, about 300 protesters gathered on Mauna Kea, some of them trying to block the access road to the summit; 23 arrests were made. Once the access road to the summit was cleared by the police, about 40 to 50 protesters began following the heavily laden and slow-moving construction trucks to the summit construction site.

On April 7, 2015, the construction was halted for one week at the request of Hawaii state governor David Ige, after the protest on Mauna Kea continued. Project manager Gary Sanders stated that TMT agreed to the one-week stop for continued dialogue; Kealoha Pisciotta, president of Mauna Kea Anaina Hou, one of the organizations that have challenged the TMT in court, viewed the development as positive but said opposition to the project would continue. On April 8, 2015, Governor Ige announced that the project was being temporarily postponed until at least April 20, 2015. Construction was set to begin again on June 24, though hundreds of protesters gathered on that day, blocking access to the construction site for the TMT. Some protesters camped on the access road to the site, while others rolled large rocks onto the road. The actions resulted in 11 arrests.

The TMT company chairman stated: "T.M.T. will follow the process set forth by the state." A revised permit was approved on September 28, 2017, by the Hawaii Board of Land and Natural Resources.

On December 2, 2015, the Hawaii State Supreme Court ruled the 2011 permit from the State of Hawaii Board of Land and Natural Resources (BLNR) was invalid ruling that due process was not followed when the Board approved the permit before the contested case hearing. The high court stated: "BLNR put the cart before the horse when it approved the permit before the contested case hearing," and "Once the permit was granted, Appellants were denied the most basic element of procedural due process – an opportunity to be heard at a meaningful time and in a meaningful manner. Our Constitution demands more".

=== 2017-2019: BLNR hearings, Court validates revised permit ===
In March 2017, the BLNR hearing officer, retired judge Riki May Amano, finished six months of hearings in Hilo, Hawaii, taking 44 days of testimony from 71 witnesses. On July 26, 2017, Amano filed her recommendation that the Land Board grant the construction permit. On September 28, 2017, the BLNR, acting on Amano's report, approved, by a vote of 5–2, a Conservation District Use Permit (CDUP) for the TMT. Numerous conditions, including the removal of three existing telescopes and an assertion that the TMT is to be the last telescope on the mountain, were attached to the permit.

On October 30, 2018, the Supreme Court of Hawaii ruled 4–1, that the revised permit was acceptable, allowing construction to proceed. On July 10, 2019, Hawaii Gov. David Ige and the Thirty Meter Telescope International Observatory jointly announced that construction would begin the week of July 15, 2019.

=== 2019 blockade and aftermath ===
On July 15, 2019, renewed protests blocked the access road, again preventing construction from commencing. On July 17, 38 protestors were arrested, all of whom were kupuna (elders) as the blockage of the access road continued. The blockade lasted 4 weeks and shut down all 12 observatories on Mauna Kea, the longest shut down in the 50-year history of the observatories. The full shut down ended when state officials brokered a deal that included building a new road around the campsite of the demonstrations and providing a complete list of vehicles accessing the road to show they are not associated with the TMT. The protests were labeled a fight for indigenous rights and a field-defining moment for astronomy. While there is both native and non-native Hawaiian support for the TMT, a "substantial percentage of the native Hawaiian population" oppose the construction and see the proposal itself as a continued disregard to their basic rights.

The 50 years of protests against the use of Mauna Kea has drawn into question the ethics of conducting research with telescopes on the mountain. The controversy is about more than the construction and is about generations of conflict between Native Hawaiians, the US Government and private interests. The American Astronomical Society stated through their Press Officer, Rick Fienberg; "The Hawaiian people have numerous legitimate grievances concerning the way they've been treated over the centuries. These grievances have simmered for many years, and when astronomers announced their intention to build a new giant telescope on Maunakea, things boiled over". On July 18, 2019, an online petition titled "Impeach Governor David Ige" was posted to Change.org. The petition gathered over 25,000 signatures. The governor and others in his administration received death threats over the construction of the telescope.

On December 19, 2019, Hawaii Governor David Ige announced that the state would reduce its law enforcement personnel on Mauna Kea. At the same time, the TMT project stated it was not prepared to start construction anytime soon.

=== 2020s ===
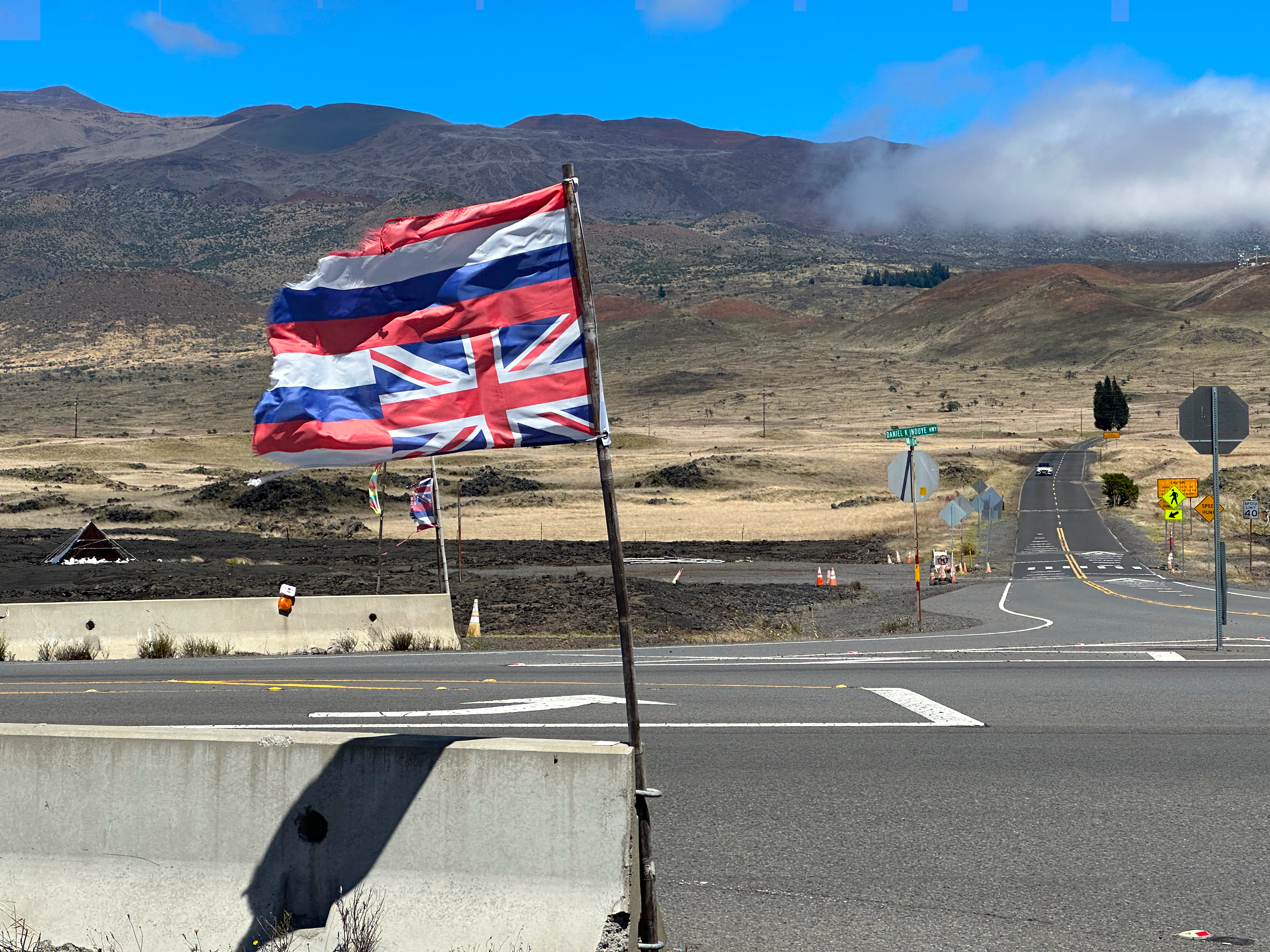
Inverted flag being flown next to Mauna Kea access road as a sign of protest, September 2023. Inverted flags can also be used as a distress signal

Early in 2020, TMT and the Giant Magellan Telescope (GMT) jointly presented their science and technical readiness to the US National Academies Astro2020 panel. Chile is the site for GMT in the south and Mauna Kea is being considered as the primary site for TMT in the north. The panel has produced a series of recommendations for implementing a strategy and vision for the coming decade of US astronomy and astrophysics frontier research and prioritize projects for future funding.

In July 2020, TMT confirmed it would not resume construction on TMT until 2021, at the earliest. The COVID-19 pandemic resulted in TMT's partnership working from home around the world and presented a public health threat as well as travel and logistical challenges.

On August 13, 2020, the Speaker of the Hawaii House of Representatives, Scott Saiki announced that the National Science Foundation (NSF) has initiated an informal outreach process to engage stakeholders interested in the Thirty Meter Telescope project. After listening to and considering the stakeholders’ viewpoints, the NSF acknowledged a delay in the environmental review process for TMT while seeking to provide a more inclusive, meaningful, and culturally appropriate process.

In November 2021, Fengchuan Liu was appointed the Project Manager of TMT and moved his office to Hilo.

As of March 2024, no further construction was announced or initiated. Continued progress on instrument design, mirror casting and polishing, and other critical operational technicalities were worked through or were being worked on. In July 2023 a new state appointed board, the Maunakea Stewardship Oversight Authority, began a five-year transition to assume management over the Mauna Kea site and all telescopes on the mountain. While there are no specific timelines or schedules regarding new start or completion dates, activist Noe Noe Wong-Wilson is quoted by Astronomy magazine as saying, "It's still early in the life of the new authority, but there's actually a pathway forward." The authority includes representatives from Native Hawaiian communities and cultural practitioners as well as astronomers and others. The body will have full control of the site from July 2028.

In December 2024, the NSF released the US Extremely Large Telescopes External Evaluation Panel Report on the TMT and the Giant Magellan Telescope (GMT) to assess their readiness to move into the major facility Final Design Phase. The panel noted that site access was an existential threat to TMT, and that mitigation for this risk in the form of the La Palma alternate site was insufficient. TMT's outreach was also unfavorably compared to the GMT, having been focused largely on Indigenous Hawaiians.

In June 2025 the United States' National Science Foundation dropped support for the TMT in favor of the GMT. This lack of funding puts the TMT's future in doubt, although the scientists in the TMT international consortium said they would press forward.

== Alternative site in the Canary Islands ==
In response to the ongoing protests that occurred in July 2019, the TMT project officials requested a building permit for a second site choice, the Spanish Observatorio del Roque de los Muchachos on the island of La Palma in the Canary Islands. Rafael Rebolo, the director of the Instituto de Astrofísica de Canarias, confirmed that he had received a letter requesting a building permit for the site as a backup in case the Hawaii site cannot be constructed. Some astronomers argue however that La Palma is not an adequate site to build the telescope due to the island's comparatively low elevation, which would enable water vapor to frequently interfere with observations due to water vapor's tendency to absorb light at midinfrared wavelengths. Such atmospheric interference could impact observing times for research into exoplanets, galactic formation, and cosmology. Other astronomers argue that construction of the telescope in La Palma would disrupt projected international collaboration between the United States and other involved countries such as Japan, Canada, and India.

Environmentalists such as Ben Magec and the environmental advocacy organization Ecologistas en Acción in the Canary Islands geared up to oppose its construction there as well. According to EEA spokesperson Pablo Bautista, the projected TMT construction area in the Canary Islands exists inside a protected conservation refuge which hosts at least three archeological sites of the indigenous Guanche people, who lived on the islands for thousands of years before Spanish colonization. On July 29, 2021, Judge Roi López Encinas of the High Court of Justice of the Canary Islands, revoked the 2017 concession of public lands by local authorities for the TMT construction. Encinas ruled that the land concessions were invalid as they were not covered by an international treaty on scientific research and that the TMT International Observatory consortium did not express firm intent to build on the La Palma site as opposed to the site in Mauna Kea. By 2023, TIO has addressed all legal cases and they are clear to build the TMT at the La Palma site now.

On July 19, 2022, the National Science Foundation announced it will carry out a new environmental survey of the possible impacts of the construction of the Thirty Meter Telescope at proposed building sites at both Mauna Kea and at the Canary Islands. Continued funding for the telescope will not be considered prior to the results of the environmental survey, updates on the project's technical readiness, and comments from the public.

On July 23, 2025, the Spanish government announced an investment of 400 million euros to bring the telescope to the Canary Islands. The board "declined to accept" the proposal.

== See also ==
- Extremely Large Telescope
- Very Large Telescope
- Giant Magellan Telescope
- Chinese Future Giant Telescope: Chinese 30-meter telescope proposal
- List of largest optical reflecting telescopes
