= Contested case hearing =

US administrative process

Contested case hearing is the name for quasi-judicial administrative hearings governed by state law. State agencies that make decisions that could affect people's "rights, duties, and privileges" must have a process for holding contested case hearings. The purpose of these hearings is to provide the decision-makers with the most complete and relevant information they need to make a proper decision. These hearings are like an informal court proceeding. They have three parts:

1. Pre-hearing: where the parties and scope of the hearing is decided
2. Hearing: where witnesses are called to testify and evidence is submitted
3. Post-hearing: where the parties propose and advocate for a particular outcome

After these three phases are complete, the decision-makers decide to either approve, deny, or approve with conditions whatever it is that is being proposed. The decision can either be made at the final hearing or a later public meeting.

== Right to cross examine ==
One of the fundamental rights afforded to parties in contested cases is the right to cross examine evidence presented against that party. Section 5 USC 556(d) contains the fundamental right to cross examine evidence used in adjudicative hearings on the record. The statute begins by articulating the substantial evidence test, which actually requires that decisions be made on "reliable, probative and substantial evidence", as follows:

Any oral or documentary evidence may be received, but the agency as a matter of policy shall provide for the exclusion of irrelevant, immaterial, or unduly repetitious evidence. A sanction may not be imposed or rule or order issued except on consideration of the whole record or those parts thereof cited by a party and supported by and in accordance with the reliable, probative, and substantial evidence.

The APA then continues by making it clear that reliability depends upon cross examination:

A party is entitled to present his case or defense by oral or documentary evidence, to submit rebuttal evidence, and to conduct such cross-examination as may be required for a full and true disclosure of the facts. In rule making or determining claims for money or benefits or applications for initial licenses an agency may, when a party will not be prejudiced thereby, adopt procedures for the submission of all or part of the evidence in written form.

The 1947 Attorney General's Manual on the Administrative Procedure Act, issued as a contemporaneous explanation of the Act, emphasizes the importance of the right of cross examination in adjudicative hearings to assure fundamental fairness. The Manual begins by explaining that technical rules of evidence will not be followed, provided that agency action is supported by reliable, probative and substantial evidence:

"The second sentence of section 7(c) [now 5 USC Section 556(d)] provides that "Any oral or documentary evidence may be received, but every agency as a matter of policy provide for the exclusion of irrelevant, immaterial, or unduly repetitious evidence. ... Under section 7(c) it is clear that, as before, the technical rules of evidence will not be applicable to administrative hearings. ... Agency action must be supported by "reliable, probative, and substantial evidence." ... Nor is an agency forbidden to draw such inferences or presumption as courts customarily employ, such as the failure to explain by a party in exclusive possession of the facts, or the presumption of continuance of a state of facts once shown to exist.

But the Attorney General's Manual makes it clear that neither the relaxation of the rules of evidence, nor the admission of documentary evidence, may swallow up the right of cross examination. The United States must produce its witnesses for cross examination.

Section 7(c) provides further that "Every party shall have the right to present his case or defense by oral or documentary evidence, to submit rebuttal evidence, and to conduct such cross-examination as may be required for a full and true disclosure of the facts.

The Manual continues:

As here used "documentary evidence" does not mean affidavits and written evidence of any kind. Such a construction would flood agency proceedings with hearsay evidence ... Against this background, it is clear that the "right to present his case or defense by oral or documentary evidence" does not extend to present evidence in affidavit or other written form so as to deprive the agency or opposing parties of opportunities for cross-examination, nor so as to force them to assume the expense of calling the affiants for cross-examination.
