= List of earth deities =

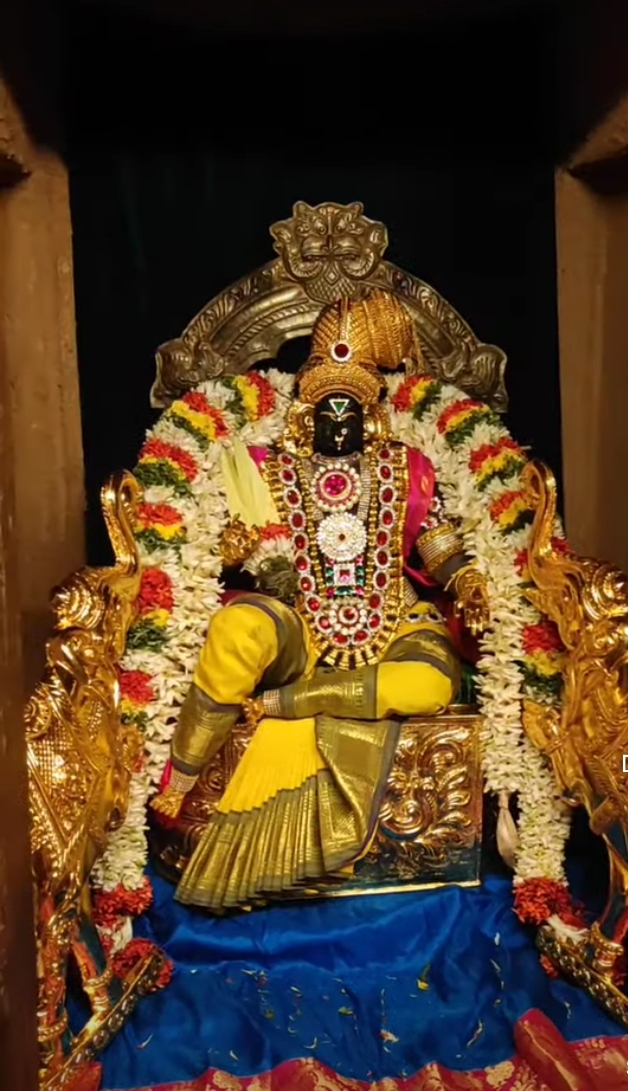
Statue of Bhumi, goddess of the earth, featured in Puranas

This is a list of earth deities. An Earth god or Earth goddess is a deification of the Earth associated with a figure with chthonic or terrestrial attributes. There are many different Earth gods and goddesses in many different cultures and mythology. However, Earth is usually portrayed as a goddess. Earth goddesses are often associated with the chthonic deities of the underworld.

In Greek mythology, the Earth is personified as Gaia, corresponding to Roman Terra, Indic Prithvi, etc. traced to an "Earth Mother" complementary to the "Sky Father" in Proto-Indo-European religion. Egyptian mythology have the sky goddesses, Nut and Hathor, with the earth gods, Osiris and Geb. Ki and Ninhursag are Mesopotamian earth goddesses.

== African mythology ==
=== Akan mythology ===
- Asase Yaa, the goddess of the harsh earth, Truth and Mother of the Dead. An ancient religious figure worshipped by the indigenous Akan people of the Guinea Coast, Asase/Yaa is also known as Aberewa which is Akan for "Old Woman". She is not only an earth goddess, but also represents procreation, truth, love, fertility, peace, and the earth of the Akan.
- Asase Afua, the goddess of the lush earth, fertility, love, procreation and farming

=== Aksumite Religion ===
- Medr/Meder, Ethiopian, Aksumite, Earth god

=== Bakongo religion ===
- Nzambici, the god of Essence, the Earth and Sky Mother, mother of all animals

=== Egyptian mythology ===
- Geb, god of the earth, vegetation, earthquakes, and snakes; "God of Earth and Land"

=== Igbo mythology ===
- Ala, alusi of the earth, morality, fertility, and creativity

=== Malagasy mythology ===
- Ratovantany, Malagasy deity that shaped humans from clay and takes their corpses after death

=== Yoruba mythology ===
- Ayé, orisha and personification of the Earth.
- Babalú-Ayé, orisha of the earth, healing and disease.

== American mythology ==
=== Aztec mythology ===
- Tlaltecuhtli, the earth deity whose body created the world
- Tezcatlipoca, Aztec deity associated with the earth, the night sky, the night winds, hurricanes, the north, obsidian, enmity, discord, rulership, divination, temptation, jaguars, sorcery, beauty, war and strife.

=== Haudenosaunee mythology ===
- Atsi tsien ke:ion (pronunciation Ageejenguyuon) meaning Mature flower - Sky woman who fell from the sky and created North America on the back of a turtle.
- Hah-nu-nah, the turtle that bears the world.

=== Inca mythology ===
- Apu, a deity of the mountains
- Mama Pacha, the goddess of the earth

=== Inuit mythology ===
- Alignak, in Inuit mythology, a lunar deity, but also god of earthquakes, as well as weather, water, tides, and eclipses

=== Lakota mythology ===
- Maka-akaŋ, the earth goddess

=== Lucumi ===
- Aganju, in Cuba, is a volcano deity for the practitioners of the Lucumi, Santeria religion

=== Taino ===
- Atabey

=== Mapuche ===
- Trengtrengfilu, Mapuche god of Earth and Fertility

=== Maya ===
- Ixik Kab/Sak Ixik, goddess of the earth, weaving, and possibly beauty and love,

=== Southwestern ===
- Spider Grandmother

== Asian mythology ==
=== Ainu mythology ===
- Cikap-kamuy, god of owls and the earth

=== Anatolian mythology ===
- Cybele, mother goddess of the earth

=== Chinese mythology ===
- Houtu, god of the earth. In Taoism, he is the Earth Goddess "Dimǔ".
- Tudigong or Tu Di Gong', local god of the earth in Taoism and Chinese folk religion, "God of Earth and Land"
- dìguān dàdì (Three Great Emperor-Officials), in Taoism and Chinese folk religion, "Emperor God of Earth and Land"
- Na Tuk Kong, in Taoism and Chinese folk religion of Malaysian Chinese - Peranakans and Chinese Indonesians, "Tutelary deity of Earth and Land"

=== Gondi mythology ===
- Bhivsen or Bhimal, god of the earth
- Bhum, goddess of the earth and mother of humanity

=== Hittite mythology ===
- Sarruma, god of the mountains
- Ubelluris, mountain god who bears the world in his shoulders

=== Hindu mythology ===
- Prithvi, the Mother-goddess of the earth, featured in Vedas and Historical Vedic religion
- Bhumi, goddess of the earth, featured in Puranas
- Hindu Vasudhara god representing the earth and the element earth

=== Buddhist mythology ===
- Kṣitigarbha, "bodhisattva of Earth and Land"
- Vasudhara, goddess

=== Meitei mythology ===
In Meitei mythology and religion:

- Leimarel Sidabi, goddess of the earth, creation, nature, and the household
- Panthoibi
- Phouoibi

=== Sumerian mythology ===
- Ki, goddess of the earth
- Ninhursag, mother goddess of the earth, fertility, mountains, and rulers
- Šumugan, in Sumerian mythology, god of the river plains, given charge by the god Enki over the flat alluvial lands of southern Mesopotamia
- Nuska vizier of the chief Sumerian god Enlil but later associated with Nippur ("Enlil City") as the god of the earth
- Enten, Sumerian fertility deity identified with the abundance of the earth
- Enlil (𒀭𒂗𒆤), ancient Mesopotamian god associated with wind, air, earth, and storms
- Enki (𒂗𒆠), Sumerian god, literal translation "Lord of the Earth"
- Emesh, Sumerian god created at the wish of Enlil to take responsibility on earth for woods, fields, sheepfolds, and stables

=== Thai mythology ===
- Phra Mae Thorani, goddess of the earth who stopped the demons from attacking the Buddha.
- Phra Bhum Chaiya mongkol (พระภูมิชัยมงคล - Bhummaso), "Tutelary deity of Earth and Land" in Thailand, Cambodia, Laos and myanmar
- Phra Mae Thorani and Phra Nang Bhum Chaiya (พระนางภูมิไชยา - Bhummaso), "Tutelary goddess of Earth and Land" in Thailand, Cambodia, Laos and myanmar

=== Turkic and Mongolian mythology ===
- Etugen Eke, goddess of the earth
- Umay (Eje)

=== Vietnamese ===
- Ông Địa, is the earth god who governs the land
- Ông Tà, the god who governs the fields and gardens
- Diêu Trì Địa Mẫu
- Bà Thổ
- Hậu Thổ
- Mẫu Địa

== European mythology ==
=== Albanian mythology ===
- Zonja e Dheut, Dheu: goddess of the earth, great mother earth, respectively

=== Baltic mythology ===
- Žemyna, goddess of the earth

=== Celtic mythology ===
- Danu, ancient goddess of the earth

=== Etruscan mythology ===
- Cel, goddess of the earth

=== Finnish mythology ===
- Maaemä, goddess of the earth

=== Georgian mythology ===
- Mindort-batoni, god of the mountains

=== Germanic mythology ===
- Jörð, goddess of the earth
- Nerthus, earth goddess
- Skaði, goddess of the mountains and winter
- Sif, (by some scholars) goddess of the earth

=== Greek mythology ===
- Demeter, goddess of the harvest, sacred law, and the earth
- Gaia, primordial goddess of the earth. She was one of the earliest elemental deities, having been created at the beginning of time. It was thought that all creation is descended from Gaia, the great mother of all things. According to Greek mythology, she was the creator of the universe and was responsible for the birth of both humanity and the first race of gods the Titans.
- Cronus, god of the harvest.
- Poseidon, one of the Twelve Olympians in ancient Greek religion and myth; god of the sea and other waters, earthquakes and horses.
- Cybele
- Persephone
- Rhea

=== Latvian mythology ===
- Zemes māte
- Māra

=== Lithuanian mythology ===
- Žemyna

=== Roman mythology ===
- Ceres, goddess of the harvest, motherhood, and the earth
- Terra, ancient goddess of the earth
- Ops
- Proserpina

=== Romanian ===
- Muma Pădurii, Mama Gaia

=== Slavic mythology ===
- Mat Zemlya, ancient goddess of the earth
- Mokosh, goddess of fertility, moisture, women, the earth, and death. One of the oldest and only goddess in the slavic religion, Old Kievan pantheon of AD 980 mentions Mokoš, which survives in East Slavic folk traditions. Known as a woman who in the evening spins flax and wool, shears sheep, and has a large head and long arms.
- Troglav, deity in Slavic mythology whose three heads were believed to represent sky, earth and the underworld.
- Veles, horned god of the underworld, water, the earth, wealth, and cattle
- Volos, Slavic god of earth, waters, and the underworld.

== Oceanian mythology ==
=== Hawaiian mythology ===
- Papahānaumoku, goddess of the earth, one who brings islands from the sea.
- Haumea, goddess of the Hawaiian Islands.
- Pele (deity), goddess of fire, lightning, wind, and volcanoes.
- Wakea, god of the earthly sky, sky father.
- Hoʻohōkūkalani, goddess of the stars and celestial sky, and daughter of Wakea and Papahānaumoku.
- Kū, god of war, politics, fishing, and farming. Full name Kūkāʻilimoku.
- Kanaloa, god of the ocean, seamanship, cephalopods, the underworld, and magic.
- Kāne, god of creation, associated with dawn, sun and the sky.
- Lono, god associated with fertility, agriculture, rainfall, music and peace.

=== Maori mythology ===
- Papa, or Papatūānuku, goddess of the earth
- Rūaumoko, in Māori mythology, god of earthquakes, volcanoes and seasons.

== Western Asian mythology ==
=== Levantine mythology ===
- Amurru, Amorite deity, occasionally called "lord of the steppe" or "lord of the mountain"

== See also ==
- Earth in culture
- Earth symbol
- Ekendriya
- Mother Earth
- Mother Nature
- List of fertility deities
