= Welaʻahilaninui =

Hawaiian progenitor god

- First man and forefather of Hawaiians
- Other names: Wela-Ahi-Lani-Nui
- Venerated in: Hawaiian religion
- Texts: Kumulipo
- Gender: Male
- Parents: Iwahinakiʻiakea (father); Lohanakiʻipapa (mother)
- Consort: Owe
- Offspring: Kahiko

In Hawaiian mythology, Welaʻahilaninui ("Welaʻahilani the Great") was a god or the first man, the forefather of Hawaiians. He is mentioned as an ancestor of Hawaiian chiefs in the ancient Hawaiian chant Kumulipo.

== Etymology ==
Welaʻahilaninui's name can also be spelled as Wela-Ahi-Lani-Nui. Wela means "heat" or "lust", whilst ahi means "fire". Lani is a word for sky. Nui means "the great".

An alternative (or secondary semantic layer) to "fire" is "one", or "first" as with kahi. This is possible through a phenomenon known in linguistics as t-glottalization or glottal replacement, which occurs when the letter "t" shifts to become the glottal stop, or ʻokina. This is a pattern frequently seen in many languages, such as the Cockney form of the English language While "kahi" does not have an onset "t", it should be recognized that "kahi" and, from the Samoan language, "tasi" share a common origin as both mean "one", or "first".

Thus Wela-Kahi-Lani-Nui may allude to "the great, original burning fire in the heavens".

== Family ==
Welaʻahilaninui's wife was called Owe. Their son was Kahiko, who fathered Wākea the Sky father.

Welaʻahilaninui's parents were Iwahinakiʻiakea (son of Hikiuanahina by Waluanahina) and his consort Lohanakiʻipapa (Umiwahinakiʻipapa), whose parents are not known.

== Mythology ==
There are many Hawaiian traditions of how people obtained fire. According to one, fire was obtained in the time of Welaʻahilaninui. This is related to his very name.

Abraham Fornander mentioned that Welaʻahilaninui and his wife were the first couple of humans. They were created by the great gods Lono, Kāne and Kū.
