= Culture of the Native Hawaiians =

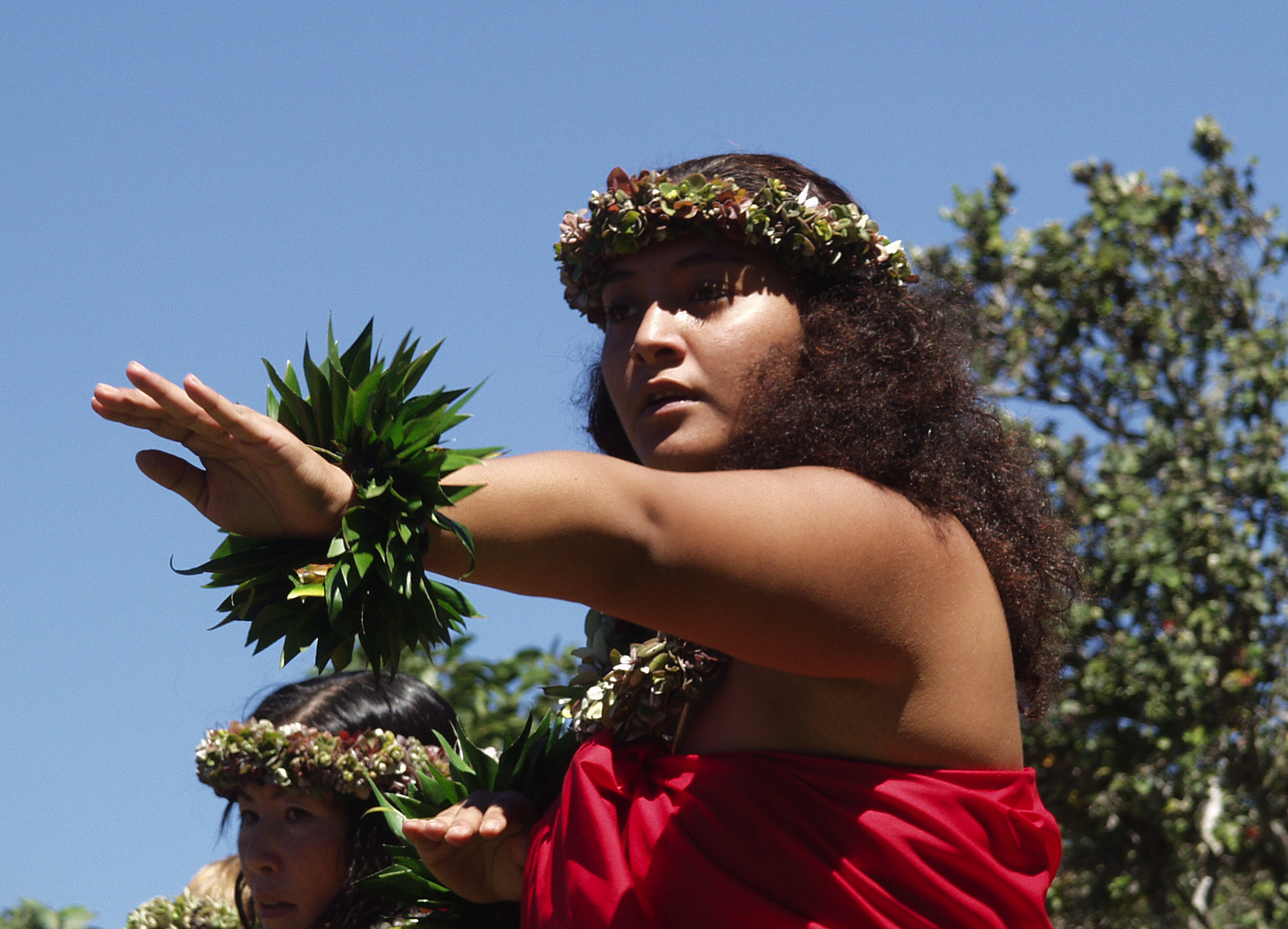
Hula kahiko performance in Hawaiʻi Volcanoes National Park

The culture of the Native Hawaiians encompasses the social behavior, institutions, and norms practiced by the original residents of the Hawaiian islands, including their knowledge, beliefs, arts, laws, customs, capabilities, and habits. Humans are estimated to have first inhabited the archipelago between 124 and 1120 AD when it was settled by Polynesians who voyaged to and settled there. Polynesia is made of multiple island groups which extend from Hawaii to New Zealand across the Pacific Ocean. These voyagers developed Hawaiian cuisine, Hawaiian art, and the Native Hawaiian religion.

== Hula ==
Hula is the dance form originating in Hawaii. It derives from other Polynesian dance form. It has two basic forms: Hula Kahiko and Hula Auana. Hula Kahiko was developed prior to contact with European cultures. Hula Auana reflects European/American influences and is performed with musical instruments (like guitars) that do not originate from the Hawaiian Islands.

The annual Merrie Monarch Festival celebrates Hula and gathers Hula Halau from across the world. It was created to honor King David Kalākaua, who was the last reigning king of Hawaii. He was known for restoring and elevating Hula in the Hawaiian Islands after the United States missionaries arrived. The halau compete and share their knowledge of Hawaiian culture. Winners are crowned in each category, including an individual female winner, Miss Aloha Hula.

Hula is more than a dance, but an art form that communicates the stories of Hawaiian politics, culture, and tradition. As hula is now practiced and recognized around the world, a very limited repertoire has been brought to mainstream culture. Much of the world views Hula as a fitness trend and cultural dance, but the genre has a much greater significance to the Hawaiian people, telling the stories of generations past.

== Voyaging ==
Polynesians traveled to Hawaii and throughout the Pacific region on voyaging canoes of their own design, navigating using only their senses, observing the skies, wind, water, and wildlife around them.

The outrigger canoe was a common means of traveling around and between the islands. Outrigger canoe paddling spread from Hawaii to become an international sport, educating people from all over the world about Hawaiian culture.

The Polynesian Voyaging Society works to preserve the skills of boat construction and navigation. They build replica canoes like traditional double-hulled canoes, sailing them across the world using Polynesian navigation methods. Their goal is to show the true strength of Polynesian voyagers, making it clear that the voyagers did not stumble upon their land by luck. The double hulled Hōkūleʻa canoe was built in the 1970s to reflect and preserve this knowledge and has since circumnavigated the earth, visiting communities and sharing knowledge since that time.

== Religion ==
The traditional Hawaiian religion is a polytheistic animistic religion. Its beliefs encompass the presence of spirits in objects such as the waves and the sky. The Hawaiian religion believes in four gods; Kāne, Kanaloa, Kū, and Lono. Kāne is the God of creation, Kanaloa is the God of the ocean, Ku is the God of war and male pursuits, and Lono is the God of peace, rain, and fertility. They also believe in forty male gods (ka hā), four hundred gods and goddesses (ke kanahā), the spirits (na ‘unihipili), and the guardians (na ‘aumākua). Notably, Pele is the goddess of volcanos and fire.

Hawaiian religion has birthed many central Hawaiian values, including respect for the 'aina (land), which stems from an emphasis on respect for Lono, the God of the land. Religion has also directed the response to volcanic eruptions and lava flows. When a volcano erupts, Hawaiians believe this is a sacred process of the Earth being reborn. This is a time to pray, sing, and give offerings to Pele, the goddess of the volcano.

The Hawaiian religion is protected under the American Indian Religious Freedom Act.

== Music ==
Mele are the Hawaiian poems and songs. Oli are chants. Mele and oli are important parts of Hawaiian rituals. Portuguese, Mexicans, and Spanish brought musical instruments such as the ukulele and the guitar that Hawaiians adopted. As Hawaiian music evolved, music using these instruments found worldwide popularity, beginning in the 1920s. Hawaiians invented the slack-key guitar and steel guitar, instruments that were soon distributed across the world.

== History ==
=== Western contact, colonization and immigration ===
First contact came in 1778 with an expedition led by James Cook, although possibly as early as 1542 with an expedition led by Ruy López de Villalobos. Christian missionaries arrived in the early 1800s, and began converting the Hawaiians to their faiths and influencing Hawaiian culture. In the 1830s, repeated interactions began between Hawaii and other cultures such as Mexican, Portuguese, and Spanish. Immediate changes could be noticed in Hawaiian culture and daily life.

Many of the missionaries developed negative opinions about Hawaiian culture. After the 1893 overthrow of the Hawaiian Kingdom there were many attempts to extinguish Hawaiian language and culture during the early 20th century. Hula, Hawaiian, paddling, and music were all frowned upon. Hawaiian children were sent to missionary schools where they were taught in English and barred from speaking Hawaiian. English also became the language of business and government, although immigrants from Japan, Portugal, the Philippines, and other places brought their languages with them.

In 1898 the United States enacted the Newlands Resolution, annexing the Hawaiian islands. In 1959, following a referendum in which over 93% of Hawaiian residents voted in favor of statehood, Hawaii became the 50th state. At its height the Hawaiian population an estimated 683,000 Native Hawaiians lived in the islands. By 1900 the native population had dropped below 100,000. The Native Hawaiian population was reduced to 20% of the total due to disease, inter-marriage and migration. The diseases spread from outside Hawaii such as smallpox, cholera, influenza, and gonorrhea. Unlike Europeans, Hawaiians had no history with these diseases and their immune systems were unprepared to fight them.

Overthrow and the influence of other cultures caused drastic changes in the Hawaiian lifestyle. The introduction of Christianity led to the overthrow of the kapu system of social stratification. Changes in traditional Hawaiian diet and introduction of foreign disease not only drastically reduced the Native Hawaiian population. Some forms of Hawaiian culture became much more modernized and Westernized as a result of this exchange. The rise of Hula Auana aptly marks the influence of Western instruments and styles on Hula as a whole.

== See also ==
- Hawaiian art
- Hawaiian language
- Lei – Flower garland popularized in the US via Hawaiian tourism
- Music of Hawaii
- Native Hawaiians
- First Hawaiian Renaissance
- Second Hawaiian Renaissance – Resurgence of distinct Hawaiian cultural identity
- Ray Jerome Baker (1880–1972), an American photographer noteworthy as a pioneering photographer, and in particular for his studies portraying the people of Hawaii
