= Kahōʻāliʻi =

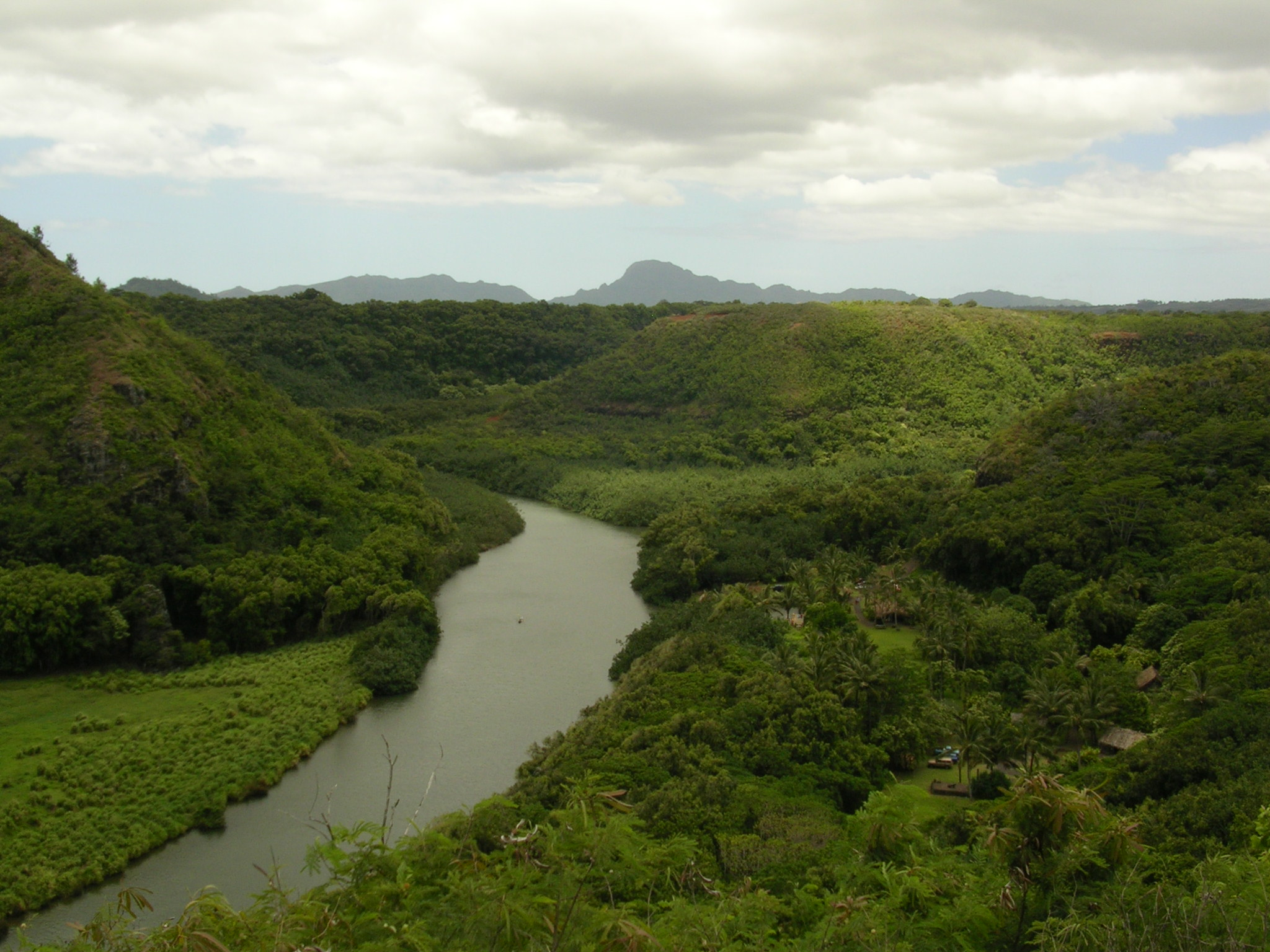
Wailua River, Kauaʻi

In the religion of Kauaʻi, Hawaii, Kahōʻāliʻi is a god sometimes associated with Lua-o-Milu. Kahōʻāliʻi also means King in Hawaiian.

== Ceremonies ==
On various ceremonial occasions, a dark man, naked, impersonated Kahōʻāliʻi. The man was marked with stripes or patches of white on the inner thighs. At the makahiki festival each winter, the eyeballs of a fish and that of a human victim were presented for him to swallow. When a heiau for human sacrifice was built, Kahōʻāliʻi was again impersonated by a naked man. When a heiau was being dedicated for the superincision of a young aliʻi, a night was set aside for Kahōʻāliʻi, during which anyone who left their house was killed. The kahuna who were looking for a victim to sacrifice were skilled at luring gullible persons out of their houses.

A walled heiau at Kawaipapa was dedicated to him. The heiau was 60 ft × 80 ft (18 m × 24 m) in size, and the walls were 5 ft (1.5 m) wide and about 4 ft (1.2 m) high. Two famous axes, Hau-mapu and ʻOlopū, were associated with Kahōʻāliʻi. The kahuna marked the ʻōhiʻa lehua to be used to build a heiau for human sacrifice by touching the tree with both these axes before it could be cut down.
