= Kahiko =

Hawaiian progenitor god

- Gender: Male
- Parents: Welaʻahilaninui (father); Owe or Lailai (mother)
- Consort: Kupulanakehao
- Offspring: Wākea

Kahiko-Lua-Mea (better known simply as Kahiko) is a god in Hawaiian mythology, who was once a chief on the Earth and lived in Olalowaia. He is mentioned in the chant Kumulipo and in the Chant of Kūaliʻi.

Kahiko is also mentioned in The Legend of Waia. The legend is that there was a head figure that had the ability to speak. He gave power to Kahiko because Waia locked to keep up with his responsibilities as a chief.

He was born c. 144 in the Ololo Genealogy.

== Etymology ==
Kahiko's name means "old" or "ancient".

== Family ==
Kahiko's parents are Welaʻahilaninui and his wife Owe. According to Abraham Fornander, Welaʻahilaninui was the first man. According to the ancient chant Kumulipo, Kahiko was a son of Chief Kealiʻiwahilani and his wife Lailai.

Kahiko married Kupulanakehao and had three sons:

- Wākea
- Lihau-ula
- Makuʻu

His granddaughter was Hoʻohokukalani.
