= Hawaiian ethnobiology =

Study of people's interaction with the environment of Hawaii

Hawaiian ethnobiology is the study of how people in Hawaii, particularly pertaining to those of pre-western contact, interacted with the plants around them. This includes to practices of agroforestry, horticulture, religious plants, medical plants, agriculture, and aquaculture.

== Conservation ==
Often in conservation, "Hawaiian ethnobiology" describes the state of ecology in the Hawaiian Islands prior to human contact. However, since "ethno" refers to people, "Hawaiian ethnobiology" is the study of how people, past and present, interact with the living world around them.

The concept of conservation was, like many things in pre-contact ancient Hawaii, decentralized. At the ahupuaʻa level, a konohiki managed the natural resource wealth. He would gather information on people's observations and make decisions as to what was kapu (strictly forbidden) during what times. Also, the concept of kuleana (responsibility) fueled conservation. Families were delegated a fishing area. It was their responsibility to not take more than they needed during fishing months, and to feed the fish kalo (Colocasia esculenta) and breadfruit (Artocarpus altilis) during a certain season. The same idea of not collecting more than what was needed, and tending to the care of "wild" harvested products extended up into the forest.

In modern times, this role is institutionalized within a central state government. This causes animosity between natural resource collectors (subsistence fisherman) and state legislature (local Department of Fish and Wildlife).

== Agroforestry ==
Managing the forest resources around you is agroforestry. This includes timber and non-timber forest crops. Hawaiian agroforestry practices

== Religious Plants ==
If a religious belief system influences a culture's practices in how the perceive and manage their environment, then that plant is part of a "sacred ecology". Hawaiian sacred plants include ʻawa (Piper methysticum), which was used both religiously as a sacrament, and by the common people as a relaxant/sedative. Other religious plants that have shaped ecology are Ki (Cordyline fruticosa) Kalo. Ki is a sterile plant, so the wide distribution of the plant across the main Hawaiian islands indicated human activity; if not directly planted, then through gravitational fragmentation.

Kalo was the staple starch crop of the Hawaiian diet. In Hawaiian genealogy, Haloa was the first born of Papa (Earth Mother) and Wakea (Sky Father). He was a still birth, so Papa went out and buried Haloa. Haloa then sprouted into the first kalo plant. Their second son they also named Haloa. He was charged with the kuleana to always care for his older brother. The historical Hawaiian people draw their direct lineage from Haloa, and did, and some still do, assume his responsibility to care for kalo. This responsibility, and need for food, drove the building of huge kalo growing complexes called loʻi.
