= Milu (mythology) =

Hawaiian god of the dead

- God of the dead; ruler of Lua-o-Milu
- Venerated in: Hawaiian religion
- Abode: Lua-o-Milu
- Enemy: Pele
- Gender: Male

Equivalents
- Greek: Hades

According to ancient Hawaiian myth, Milu is the god of the dead and ruler of Lua-o-Milu. He is now thought to share analogs with Hades.

Under his command, are a host of beings known as spirit catchers who would trap wandering ghosts and bring them to his afterlife domain. He fought alongside Ulupoka against Pele.

In one legend, a chief harrowed of the loss of his wife, has his prayers answered and receives guidance from a deity who shows him the way into Milu's kingdom. They journey far out and find a tree split in two. Next they slide down it into the Earth's lower regions. Here, the deity hid behind a rock and covered the chief with odd smelling oil then sent him out by himself. Once the chief found Milu's palace, he noticed a group of spirits who were so distracted in the game they were playing, he was able to join, and luckily, when they did realize he was near them, they mistook him for a stinking ghost. When the crowd was finished, they wanted to play another game, hence the chief proposed they should all pull their eyes out and paid his attention to those belonging to Milu. He later caught them in a coconut cup and blinded the god. Now he was able to escape to Wākea's heaven, where the Underworld's inhabitants could not set foot. Eventually a deal was made and Milu's eyes were returned, on the condition that the chief's wife's soul be brought back.
