= Kumulipo =

Hawaiian chant

- Translator: Liliʻuokalani
- Written: 18th century
- Language: Hawaiian
- Subject(s): Creation, genealogy
- Genre: Creation chant
- Publication date: 1889
- Published in English: 1897
- Lines: 2,102

In Hawaiian religion, the Kumulipo is the creation chant, first recorded in the 18th century. It also includes a genealogy of the members of Hawaiian royalty and was created in honor of Kalaninuiamamao and passed down orally to his daughter Alapaʻiwahine.

== Creation chant ==
In the Kumulipo the world was created over a cosmic night. This is not just one night, but many nights over time. The ancient Hawaiian kahuna and priests of the Hawaiian religion would recite the Kumulipo during the makahiki season, honoring the god Lono. In 1779, Captain James Cook arrived in Kealakekua Bay on the island of Hawaiʻi during the season and was greeted by the Hawaiians reciting the Kumulipo. Some stories say Cook was mistaken for Lono, because of the type of sails on his ship and his pale skin tone.

In 1889, King Kalākaua printed a sixty-page pamphlet of the Kumulipo. Attached to the pamphlet was a two-page paper on how the chant was originally composed and recited.

Years later Queen Liliʻuokalani described the chant as a prayer of the development of the universe and the ancestry of the Hawaiians. Liliʻuokalani translated the chant under house arrest in ʻIolani Palace. The translation was published in 1897, then republished by Pueo Press in 1978.

The Kumulipo is a total of 2,102 lines long, in honor of Kalaninuiamamao, who created peace for all when he was born. There was a lot of fighting between his ʻI and Keawe family, who were cousins, so his birth stopped the two from feuding. The Kumulipo is a cosmogonic genealogy, which means that it relates to the creation of the universe and the descent of humans and other entities. Out of the 2,102 lines, it has 16 wā, which means era or age. In each wā, something is born, whether it is a human, plant, or other creature.

== Divisions ==
The Kumulipo is divided into sixteen wā, sections. The first seven wā fall under the section of pō (darkness), the age of spirit. The Earth may or may not exist, but the events described do not take place in a physical universe. The words show the development of life as it goes through similar stages as a human child. All plants and animals of sea and land, earth and sky, male and female are created.

These are the first twelve lines of the Kumulipo, in Hawaiian, in Liliʻuokalani's English translation and in Bastian's German translation. Two other significant English translations, Rock's translation of Bastian and Beckwith's translation, appear in Beckwith's 1951 book The Kumulipo.

Hawaiian	English (Liliʻuokalani)	German (Bastian)
1. O ke au i kahuli wela ka honua 2. O ke au i kahuli lole ka lani 3. O ke au i kukaʻiaka ka la 4. E hoʻomalamalama i ka malama 5. O ke au o Makaliʻi ka po 6. O ka walewale hoʻokumu honua ia 7. O ke kumu o ka lipo, i lipo ai 8. O ke kumu o ka Pō, i po ai 9. O ka lipolipo, o ka lipolipo 10. O ka lipo o ka la, o ka lipo o ka po 11. Po wale ho--ʻi 12. Hānau ka pō (Note: Bastian's, Rock's and Beckwith's translations end on line 11, omitting "Hānau ka pō".)	1. At the time that turned the heat of the earth, 2. At the time when the heavens turned and changed, 3. At the time when the light of the sun was subdued 4. To cause light to break forth, 5. At the time of the night of Makaliʻi (winter); 6. Then began the slime which established the earth, 7. The source of deepest darkness, of the depth of darkness, 8. The source of Night, of the depth of night 9. Of the depth of darkness, 10. Of the darkness of the sun in the depth of night, 11. Night is come, 12. Born is Night	1. Hin dreht der Zeitumschwung zum Ausgebrannten der Welt, 2. Zurück der Zeitumschwung nach aufwärts wieder, 3. Noch sonnenlos die Zeit verhüllten Lichtes, 4. Und schwankend nur im matten Mondgeschimmer; 5. Aus Makaliʻi's nächt'gem Wolkenschleier; 6. Durchzittert schaftenhaft das Grundbild künft'ger Welt.; 7. Des Dunkels Beginn aus den Tiefen (Wurzeln) des Abgrunds, 8. Der Uranfang von Nacht in Nacht, 9. Von weitesten Fernen her, von weitesten Fernen, 10. Weit aus den Fernen der Sonne, weit aus den Fernen der Nacht, 11. Noch Nacht ringsumher.

The second section, containing the remaining nine wā, is ao and is signaled by the arrival of light and the gods, who watch over the changing of animals into the first humans. After that is the complex genealogy of Kalaninuiamamao that goes all the way to the late 18th century.

== Births in each wā ==
The births in each age include:

1. In the first wā, the sea urchins and limu (seaweed) were born. The limu was connected through its name to the land ferns. Some of these limu and fern pairs include: ʻEkaha and ʻEkahakaha, Limu ʻAʻalaʻula and ʻalaʻalawainui mint, Limu Manauea and Kalo Maunauea upland taro, Limu Kala and ʻakala berry. These plants were born to protect their sea cousins.
2. In the second wā, 73 types of fish. Some deep sea fish include Naiʻa (porpoise) and the Manō (shark). Also reef fish, including Moi and Weke. Certain plants that have similar names are related to these fish and are born as protectors of the fish.
3. In the third wā, 52 types of flying creatures, which include birds of the sea such as ʻIwa (frigate or man-of-war bird), the Lupe, and the Noio (Hawaiian noddy tern). These sea birds have land relatives, such as ʻIo (hawk), Nēnē (goose), and Pueo (owl). In this wā, insects were also born, such as Peʻelua (caterpillar) and the Pulelehua (butterfly).
4. In the fourth wā, the creepy and crawly creatures are born. These include Honu (sea turtle), Ula (lobster), Moʻo (lizards), and Pololia (jellyfish). Their cousins on land include Kuhonua (maile vine) and ʻOheʻohe bamboo.
5. In the fifth wā, Kalo (taro) is born. Kamapuaʻa (akua) is born.
6. In the sixth wā, Uku (flea) and the ʻIole (rat) are born.
7. In the seventh wā, ʻĪlio (dog) and the Peʻapeʻa (bat) are born.
8. In the eighth wā, the four divinities are born: Laʻilaʻi (female), Kiʻi (male), Kāne (god), Kanaloa (octopus), respectively.
9. In the ninth wā, Laʻilaʻi takes her eldest brother Kiʻi as a mate and the first humans are born from her brain.
10. In the tenth wā, Laʻilaʻi takes her next brother Kāne as a mate after losing interest in Kiʻi, she then had four of Kāne's children: Laʻiʻoloʻolo, Kamahaʻina (male), Kamamule (male), Kamakalua (female). Laʻilaʻi soon returned to Kiʻi and three children are born: Haʻi (female), Haliʻa (female), and Hākea (male). Having been born during their mothers being with two men they become "Poʻolua" and claim the lineage of both fathers.
11. The eleventh wā pays homage to the Moa.
12. The twelfth wā honors the lineage of Wākea, whose son Hāloa is the ancestor of all people.
13. The thirteenth wā honors the lineage of Hāloa's mother Papahānaumoku.
14. In the fourteenth wā, Liʻaikūhonua mates with Keakahulihonua, and have their child Laka.
15. The fifteenth wā refers to Haumeanuiʻāiwaiwa and her lineage; it also explains Māui's adventures and siblings.
16. The sixteenth wā recounts all of Māui's lineage for forty-four generations, all the way down to the Moʻi of Māui, Piʻilani.

In the 19th and early 20th centuries, anthropologists Adolf Bastian and Roland Burrage Dixon interpreted a recurring verse of the Kumulipo as describing the octopus as the sole survivor of a previous age of existence. (Note: "As type follows type, the accumulating slime of their decay raises the land above the waters, in which, as spectator of all, swims the octopus, the lone survivor from an earlier world." (Dixon, p. 15)) (Note: "In fünfter Stanze findet sich jene im höchsten Grade cuiriose Auffassung des Octopus, worauf bereits aufmerksam gemacht wurde, als in seiner zoologischen Stellung gleichsam die Reste eines vorweltlichen Typus anerkennend, und so wird auf den Gilbert-Inseln Aditi oder Tiki durch seine Schwester (als Octopus) in Aufrichtung des Himmels unterstützt, indem sie ihm mit ihren Tentakeln höher emporhebt. [...] Am Ende der zweiten Schöpfungsperiode scheinen die ersten Zeichen der Dämmerung heraufzuziehen, in der dritten wird unter dem Gewühl der hervordränofenden Reptilien und Meerungeheuer der bisher isolirte Tintenfisch im Gewuhl mit fortgerissen, in der vierten spielt ein undeutlich trüber Lichtsehimmer, unter welchem die Nutzpflanzen in Existenz treten, in der fünften, unter Abscheidung von Tag und Nacht, kommen (mit besonderem Pomp) die Schweine hervor, in der sechsten die Mäuse, und nach den Vorbereitungen in der siebenten tritt in der achten der Mensch auf und damit das Licht." (Bastian, pages 107–108)) In her 1951 translation of the Kumulipo, ethnographer Martha Warren Beckwith provided a different translation of the verse, although she does discuss the possibility that "octopus" is the correct translation and describes the god Kanaloa. (Note: Regarding the third verse: "I have arrived at no satisfactory translation. Bastian, who had only the manuscript before him, which reads He pou heʻe i ka wawa, refers the word heʻe to the octopus and soliloquizes: "During this period of creation of the lowest forms of animal life . . . the octopus is present as observer of the process described. . . "; but, since my purpose is to interpret Kalākaua's text, unless clearly bungled, I follow Hoʻolapa's doubtful rendering: "Darkness slips into light," [...] In the Kumulipo manuscript the first line of the refrain accompanying the births of the first four sections reads, not Ka po uheʻe i ka wawa with its suggestion of the "slipping away" (uheʻe) of night, but Ka pou heʻe i ka wawa, thus picturing the god in the form of an octopus (heʻe) supporting (pou) in darkness the first heaven and earth exactly as in the Tahitian chant." (Beckwith, pages 53, 169))

== Comparative literature ==
Comparisons may be made between marital partners (husband and wife often have synonymous names), between genealogical and flora-fauna names, and in other Polynesian genealogies. (Note: See Kumulipo spouse-names, terms for flora and fauna in the Kumulipo, and Maori and Rarotongan parallels with the Kumulipo.)

== Cultural impact ==
The supermassive black hole M87*, captured by the Event Horizon Telescope, was informally given the Hawaiian name "Pōwehi", a poetic description of generative darkness or the spirit world taken from the Kumulipo.

In 2009, the poet Jamaica Heolimeleikalani Osorio performed her poem, Kumulipo, at a poetry event at the White House.
