= Papahānaumoku =

Earth Mother of ancient Hawaiian religion

- Earth
- Gender: Female
- Consort: Wākea
- Offspring: Hoʻohōkūkalani

In the religion and mythology of the ancient Hawaiians, Papahānaumoku (pronounced [ˈpɐpəˈhaːnɐwˈmoku]) — often simply called Papa — is a goddess and the Earth Mother. She is mentioned in the chants as the consort of the sky god Wākea. Their daughter is beautiful goddess Hoʻohōkūkalani, the main character of one myth. Papa is still worshipped by some Hawaiians, especially by women, as a primordial force of creation who has the power to give life and to heal. The Northwestern Hawaiian Islands Marine National Monument was renamed in 2007 to the Papahānaumokuākea Marine National Monument, in honour of Papa.

== Mythology ==
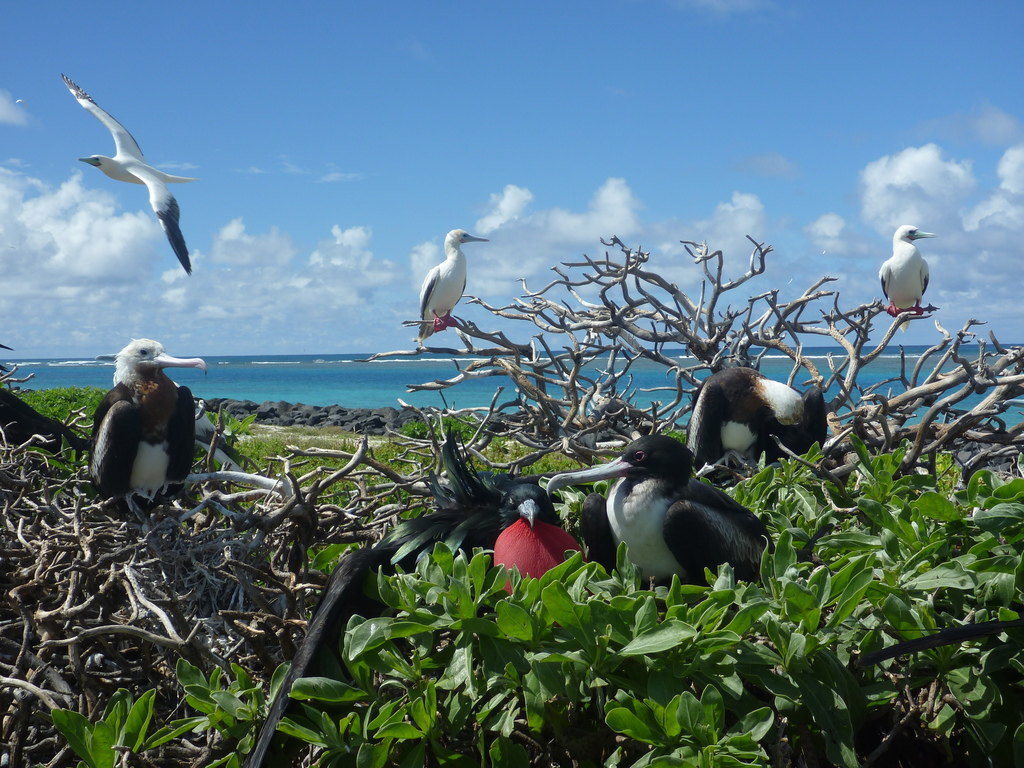
In the Hawaiian religion, Papahānaumoku is the mother of the islands and creator of life.

According to the ancient myths, Papa is the wife of Wākea, son of the god Kahiko. Wākea is the Father Sky in the Hawaiian religion and a personification of the male creative power. He and Papa are representations of the divine masculinity and femininity. Together, they created the Hawaiian Islands and became the ancestors of the Hawaiian chiefs and noblemen. The most important offspring of Papa are the islands called Hawaiʻi, Maui, Oʻahu and Kauaʻi. Chiefs claimed their descent from Papa and it was believed they were divine as well.

The most famous child of Wākea and Papa is called Hoʻohōkūkalani, and she became Wākea's lover, according to the famous myth. When Hoʻohōkūkalani gave birth to a stillborn baby, it was Papa who named the child Hāloa and buried him in the soft earth; from that place sprung the first taro. Hoʻohōkūkalani again mated with her father, and had a living child, who was also named Hāloa.

== Worship ==
A women's temple, called Hale o Papa, is the primary religious structure associated with the worship of this goddess. Hale o Papa are often built in connection with luakini, or "men's temples" (places of "official" ceremony, which are primarily dedicated to the gods Kū and Lono), although it is believed by many practitioners that they may also exist independently.

In the Aloha ʻĀina movement, Papa is often a central figure, as her spirit is that of the life-giving, loving, forgiving Earth who nurtures human life, and who is being abused by the misdeeds of mankind, especially in regard to the abuse of nature.

== See also ==
- Rangi and Papa
- Mother Nature
