= Hāloa =

Hawaiian mythological figure and creation chant

Haloa (Hawaiian: Hāloa) is a Hawaiian mythological figure who was born of Hawaiian gods, and is the ancestor of the Hawaiian people. The title of a well-known chant about him and the creation of the Hawaiian Islands is also "Haloa".

== Birth of the islands ==
Papahānaumoku, the mother of Earth, married Wākea, the father of Heaven, and gave birth to the islands of Hawaii, Maui and Kahoʻolawe. While she was away in her native land (Tahiti etc.), Wākea was united with other goddesses and had the islands of Molokai and Lanai with them.

Later, Papa returned to Hawaii and was united with another god, and gave birth to the island of Oahu. She then was united with Wākea again, and gave births to the islands of Kauai and Niihau in the far west, thus completing the creation of the Hawaiian Islands,

== Birth of Haloa ==
Papahānaumoku and Wakea had many children, including a daughter called Hoʻohōkūkalani. When she turned into a beautiful girl, Wakea was united with her, but their first baby, named Haloa, was still-born. As the baby was buried to the ground, there came out from the ground the taro, which became the important staple food of the Hawaiian people.

Their second baby, also called Haloa, grew to become a healthy child, and was the ancestor of the Hawaiian people.

== Haloa chant ==
The story of the creation of the Hawaiian Islands and the first Hawaiian was told orally from generation to generation for a long time. When the Hawaiian writing system was established in the 18th century, it was put into documents, especially the Kumulipo of the Hawaiian royalty's story of creation and genealogy. The Kumulipo was later opened for public and was translated into English.

HĀLOA
ʻO Wākea noho lā Papahānaumoku
Hānau o Hawaiʻi, he moku
Hānau o Maui, he moku
Hoi hou o Wā (Hui）kea noho lā Hoʻohōkūkalani
Hānau o Molokaʻi, he moku
Hānau o Lānaʻi ka ula, he moku ...

HALOA in English
Wākea was united with Papahānaumoku
Gave birth forth to Hawaiʻi
Gave birth to Maui
And was united with Hoʻohōkūkalani
Gave birth forth to Molokaʻi
Gave birth to Lānaʻi ...

This chant can be recited by one person, or by a group of people with its leader and the other people in responsive reading.

A similar chant is also available as "Mele a Pākui".

== See also ==
- Culture of Hawaii
- Hawaiian religion
- Polynesian Mythology
- Hawaiian ethnobiology
