= Kāne =

Highest Polynesian god of procreation, sky, and sun

- Creator god, associated with procreation
- Animals: Pigs
- Symbols: Coconuts; Awa
- Tree: Breadfruit; Wauke
- Associated deities: Kanaloa

Equivalents
- Tahiti and Society Islands mythology: Tāne

In Hawaiian mythology, Kāne is considered the highest of the three major Hawaiian deities, along with Kū and Lono. He represented the god of procreation and was worshipped as the ancestor of chiefs and commoners. Kāne is the creator and gives life associated with dawn, sun, and sky.

== Worship and symbols ==
No human sacrifice or laborious ritual was needed in the worship of Kāne. In the Kumuhonua legend, he created Earth, bestowed it with sea creatures, animals, plants, and created man and woman. Offerings for Kāne include fish, coconut, or taro. It was common for worshipers to have their front doors face east as a sign of worship, as well as to turn towards the sun during morning prayers to Kāne. He would be invoked during the building of canoes.

Pigs, coconuts, breadfruit, awa, and the wauke plant are all considered sacred to Kāne.

== Mythology ==
Kāne is credited with bringing edible plants to Hawaiʻi. It is said that he and Kanaloa first came from Kahiki and traveled through the islands of Hawaiʻi together. One account says that they lived in Waipio valley for a time with Maliu, Kaekae, and Ouli. There, they cultivated bananas and lived peacefully.

=== Creation story ===
The 1907 book Legends of Hawaii has the following account of creation involving Kāne. The author says that there are several versions of this story, probably due to waves of immigration from different areas of Polynesia at different times, but generally they agree on the major points. It says that in the beginning, there was nothing but Po; the endless black chaos. Then Kāne, sensing that he was separate from the Po, pulled himself free of Po by an act of sheer will. Sensing Kāne's presence, Lono and then Kū also pulled themselves free of Po. Then Kāne created the light to push back Po. Lono brought sound to the universe and Kū brought substance. Between them, they created all the lesser Gods. Then together, the three Gods created the Menehune, the lesser spirits to be their messengers and servants. After they created the world to be a footstool for the Gods. Finally, they gathered red clay from the four corners of the world, they mixed the clay with their spittle and molded it into the shape of a man. Then Kāne took a special magical white clay and formed it into a head. Then the three Gods breathed life into the statue and created the first man. The first man was created in the image of Kāne.

There is a parallel legend that says that Kāne alone breathed life into the man-statue. That version of the creation myth found in Sacred Texts credits Kāne alone with the creation of the heavens. It then goes on to explain man was made in the image of Kāne by the hands of Ku with Lono as an assistant. At the same time, Kanaloa tried to duplicate Kāne's feat, but his statue failed to come to life. So he challenged him, saying something to the effect, "that man will live only a certain span of time, then he will die. When he dies, I will claim him as my own." This seems to tie in with his position as ruler of the dead as an entity separate from Kāne. Some versions say that Kanaloa is the alter ego of Kāne, the dark half so to speak. Others say he is a lesser god who was created to be in charge of the dead. The author of this particular book says that in the oldest legends, prior to about 1100 A.D., there is no mention of Kanaloa. The author is of the opinion that Kanaloa is, therefore, an addition from some later wave of immigration to the islands. An alternative version has Kanaloa as god of the sea associated with squid or an octopus often seen in the same light as Christian devil and the counterpart of Kāne through the stories of strife.

There is another completely separate legend about the creation of man found in the Kumulipo. The first-born son of the Wākea the sky god and Hoʻohokukalani the keeper of stars is stillborn. When he is buried, the first Kalo plant springs from his navel. Named Hāloa or Long Breathe. The second-born son named after the first, is the first modern man. Hence the two sons are eternally connected. Man tends his brother the Kalo, and the Kalo feeds his brother the man. In that version, there is no mention of Kāne. Elsewhere in the Kumulipo, Kāne is born together with Kanaloa and the first man, Kiʻi.

Aloha, the traditional greeting, was originally spoken while touching foreheads and exchanging a breath of air. This is possibly a reflection of the legend, exchanging the breath of life, Håloa; originally given by the Gods.

== See also ==
- Tāne – the Māori god
- Kumulipo - Hawaiian creation chant
