= Ulupoka =

Polynesian god of evil

In Fijian and Polynesian mythology, Ulupoka is the god of evil and demons. According to legend, during a great battle between the gods, Ulupoka was beheaded by the other gods, but due to his divine nature, he did not die. The gods took Ulupoka's head and hid it, leaving his body behind. For centuries, his body has been wandering around, causing death, disease, mischief, and misfortune.

== Story ==
When Milu, the Polynesian god of the Underworld, encountered Ulupoka's body (the first time he had seen Ulupoka since he had been beheaded), he promised Ulupoka that he would help him reunite with his head if Milu would allow him to use Ulupoka's body to take control of the Hawaiian Islands in revenge against the goddess Pele, who had imprisoned him for centuries. Ulupoka accepted this offer and joined Milu's takeover of Hawaii, leading the forces of evil against the Hawaiian troops and people.

Weeks after Milu captured the Hawaiian Islands, he and his army, including Ulupoka, were heavily defeated by the military forces of the nations around the Pacific Ocean and Pele's army. As a result, Ulupoka became angry with Milu and left him, instead traveling all over the Pacific Islands in search of his head once again, making the islanders sick with his body.

Ulupoka fought the other gods several times, usually resulting in him being pushed back into the ocean or making everyone around him sick so he could escape. He hates humans, seeing them as weak and shallow beings who foolishly take pride in their heads, which are nothing more than symbols of their ignorance and emptiness.

Today, Ulupoka continues to search for his own head, spreading evil and disease wherever he goes in pursuit of it. He is against humans, their morality, and their love. He sees himself as a 'wounded god' who should not be underestimated. He is eager to spread any evil or use demons to attack others. Milu once again offers his help to Ulupoka, who, weary from searching for his head, accepts the offer again. This time, he plans to find his own head before he invades more 'stupid islands'.

It is said that Ulupoka's head still seeks his body today, biting the necks and heads of sleeping people, bringing sickness and death in its wake. His head is known to travel at the speed of hurricane winds across the Pacific region in search of his body.
