= Leina a Kaʻuhane =

Rock off Oahu in Hawaiian folklore

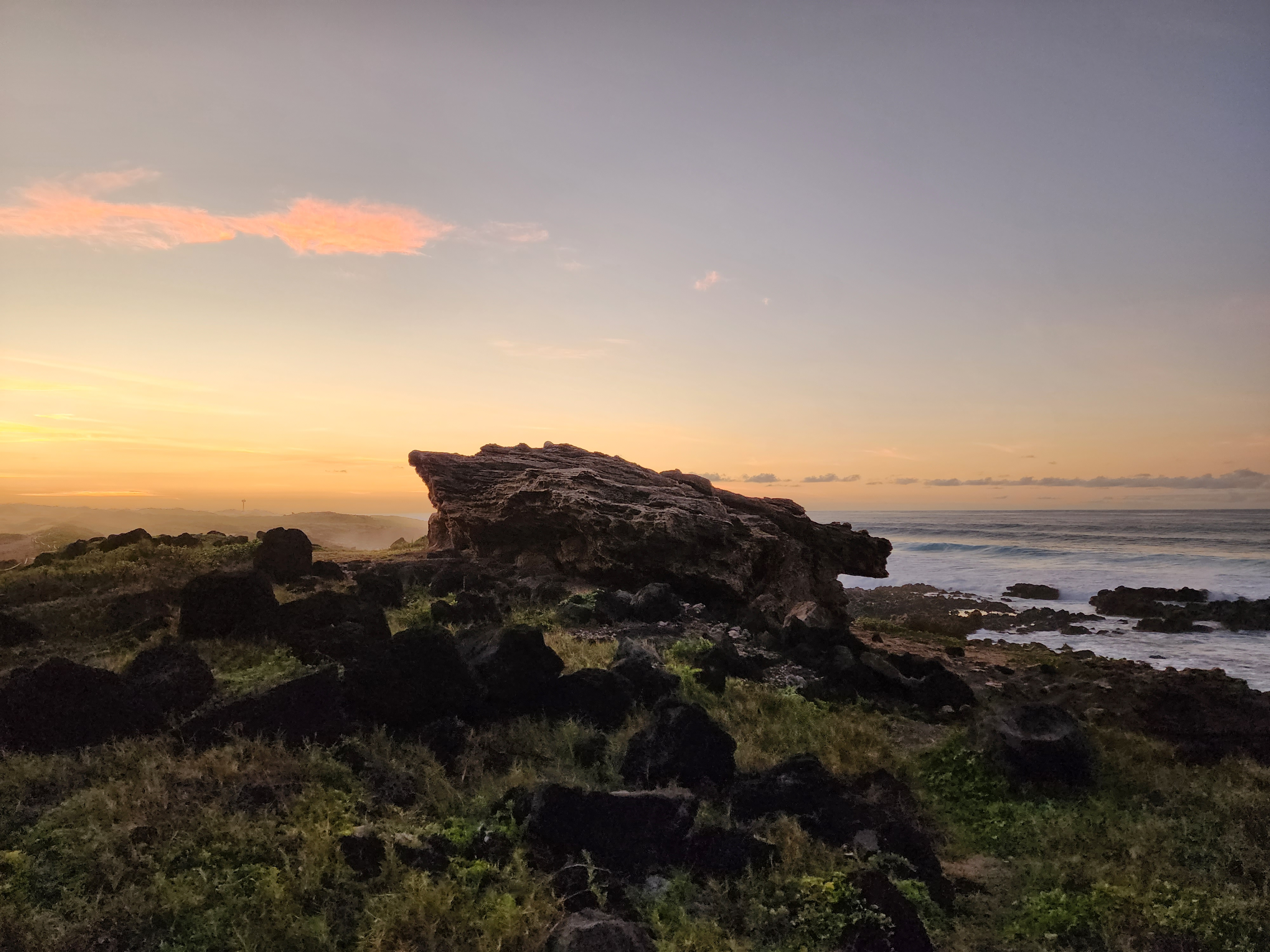
Leina a Kaʻuhane, the leaping place of souls

Leina a Kaʻuhane (also spelled Leina-a-ka-ʻuhane or Leina Kauhane; meaning "leaping place of souls") is a white rock located approximately 0.4 mi (0.64 km) offshore on the northwest area of the Hawaiian island Oahu. It is noted in Hawaiian folklore as the point where souls of the dead journey into the afterlife (Lua-o-Milu) and overlooks the ocean. The term Rienga (lit., "the leaping place") is used in New Zealand and is considered to parallel this concept. Suitably, within their belief system, the Marquesans applied it to the northernmost island of their region as well.
