= Ouli, Cameroon =

Coordinates: 5.2000°N 14.5500°E

Ouli
- Commune and town
- Interactive map of Ouli
- Country: Cameroon
- Time zone: UTC+1 (WAT)

Ouli is a town and commune in Cameroon.

== See also ==
- Communes of Cameroon
