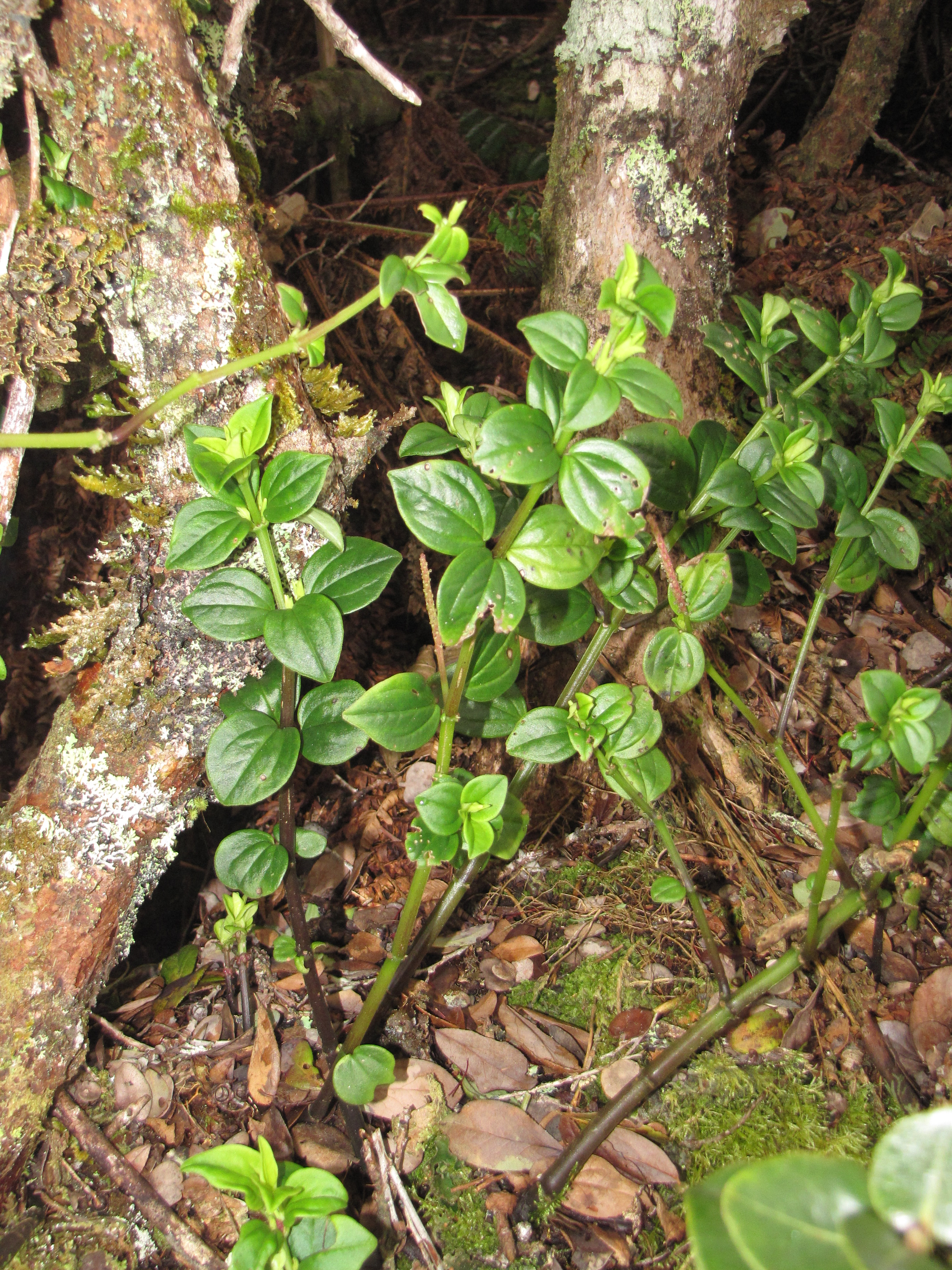

Scientific classification
- Kingdom: Plantae
- Clade: Tracheophytes
- Clade: Angiosperms
- Clade: Magnoliids
- Order: Piperales
- Family: Piperaceae
- Genus: Peperomia
- Species: P. cookiana

Binomial name
- Peperomia cookiana C.DC.

Synonyms
- List: Peperomia asperulata C.DC.; Peperomia flavinerva C.DC.; Peperomia helleri C.DC.; Peperomia hiloana C.DC.; Peperomia kamoloana C.DC.; Peperomia knudsenii C.DC.; Peperomia kohalana C.DC.; Peperomia minutilimba (Yunck.) H.St.John; Peperomia opacilimba C.DC.; Peperomia ovatilimba C.DC.; Peperomia pleistostachya Hillebr.; Peperomia pukooana C.DC.; Peperomia refractifolia H.Lév.

= Peperomia cookiana =

Species of plant

Peperomia cookiana, is a species of plant in the genus Peperomia. It is endemic to Hawaiian Islands.

== Accepted varieties ==
Apart from the basic Peperomia cookiana, four varieties are currently known:

- Peperomia cookiana var. flavinervia (C.DC.) Yunck.
- Peperomia cookiana var. minutilimba Yunck.
- Peperomia cookiana var. ovatilimba (C.DC.) Yunck.
- Peperomia cookiana var. pukooana (C.DC.) Yunck.
