= Lua-o-Milu =

Land of the dead in Hawaiian religion

In Hawaiian religion, Lua-o-Milu is the land of the dead, ruled by Milu. Entrance to Lua-o-Milu is from the top of a valley wall or sea cliff where the soul departs via a tree. It is reported that each Hawaiian island has at least one leaping place. According to natives of the land, the entrance located in Waipio Valley has since been covered in sand and is now hidden from the sight of upper areas. Another documented area where souls enter the next world is Leina Kauhane. The spirits of the dead can watch what the living do and turn them to stone by staring at them.

== See also ==
- Nightmarchers, Hawaiian spirits of warriors that instantly kill anyone who sees them, unless they are the warrior's descendants.
