= Hoʻohōkūkalani =

Hawaiian goddess

- Stars
- Gender: Female
- Parents: Papahānaumoku (mother); Wākea (father)
- Consort: Wākea
- Offspring: Hāloa

Hoʻohōkūkalani is a Hawaiian goddess, mentioned in the ancient chants. She is described as a beautiful woman, who became a consort to her own father. Her full name is given as Kahoʻohokuokalani-i-kau-i-kaheahea ("she who sets the stars in heaven and adorns the celestial regions").

== Mythology ==
According to the myth, Hoʻohōkūkalani is the daughter of the god Wākea (Sky Father) or the expanse of the heavens and his wife Papahānaumoku (Earth Mother), who are the deities of male and female creative energy. Wākea and Papahānaumoku (which means "to adorn the heavens with stars") created the Hawaiian islands, and then, Hoʻohōkūkalani was born.

When Hoʻohōkūkalani grew up, Wākea was enchanted by her beauty, and he had a sexual desire for her, although she was his child. However, he could not sleep with his daughter because he was afraid of Papahānaumoku. He then ordered his priest to take away Papahānaumoku.

When Papahānaumoku went away with the priest, Wākea and Hoʻohōkūkalani had sexual relations, and she bore a stillborn son, called Hāloa. The son was then buried facing the rising sun in the East. From this spot, taro sprung. The plant, which had heart-shaped leaves and was rather large, was named Hāloanakalaukapalili. This plant was very important for the diet of the Hawaiians. Later, Wākea and Hoʻohōkūkalani produced another, living child, also called Hāloa, who was the first of the Native Hawaiian people. This is where the saying "mamo na Hāloa," or descendant of Hāloa originate from. It is a popular belief throughout the Native Hawaiian people that through their relationship to Hāloa, they are related to the kalo (or taro) and are thus related to the rest of the world.
