= Kū =

Hawaiian god of war

- God of war, politics, farming and fishing
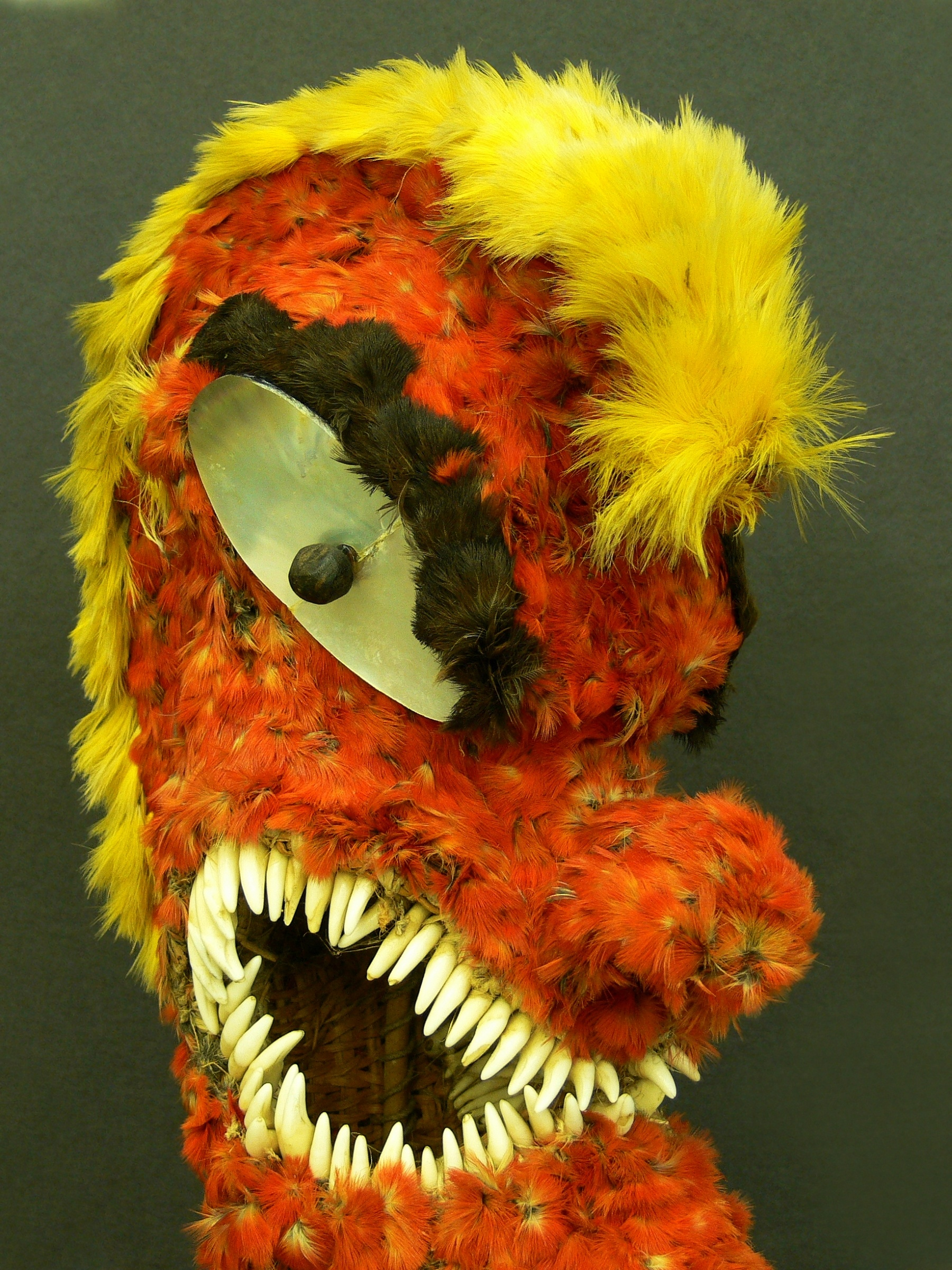
- Kūkaʻilimoku or simply Kū, feather sculpture of the Hawaiian war god from the 18th century

Genealogy
- Spouse: Hina

In Hawaiian religion, Kū is one of the four great gods. The other three are Kanaloa, Kāne, and Lono.

Some feathered god images (kiʻi) or akua hulu manu are considered to represent Kū. Kū is worshiped under many names, including Kūkāʻilimoku, the "Snatcher of Land". Rituals for Kūkaʻilimoku included human sacrifice, which was not part of the worship of other gods.

== Names of Kū ==
Owing to the multiplicity inherent in Hawaiian concepts of deity, Kū may be invoked under many names such as the following, which reference subordinate manifestations of the god.

=== Forest and rain ===
- Ku-moku-haliʻi (Ku spreading over the land)
- Ku-pulupulu (Ku of the undergrowth)
- Ku-olono-wao (Ku of the deep forest)
- Ku-holoholo-pali (Ku sliding down steps)
- Ku-pepeiao-loa/-poko (Big and small-eared Ku)
- Kupa-ai-keʻe (Adzing out the canoe)
- Ku-mauna (Ku of the mountain)
- Ku-ka-ohia-laka (Ku of the ohia-lehua tree)
- Ku-ka-ieie (Ku of the wild pandanus vine)

=== Husbandry and fishing ===
- Ku-ka-o-o (Ku of the digging stick)
- Ku-kuila (Ku of dry farming)
- Ku-keolowalu (Ku of wet farming)
- Ku-ula or Ku-ula-kai (Ku of the abundance of the sea)

=== War ===
- Ku-nui-akea (Ku the supreme one)
- Ku-kaʻili-moku (Ku snatcher of land)
- Ku-keoloewa (Ku the supporter)
- Ku-hoʻoneʻenuʻu (Ku pulling together the earth)

=== Sorcery ===
- Ku-waha-ilo (Ku of the maggot-dropping mouth)

== Religion ==
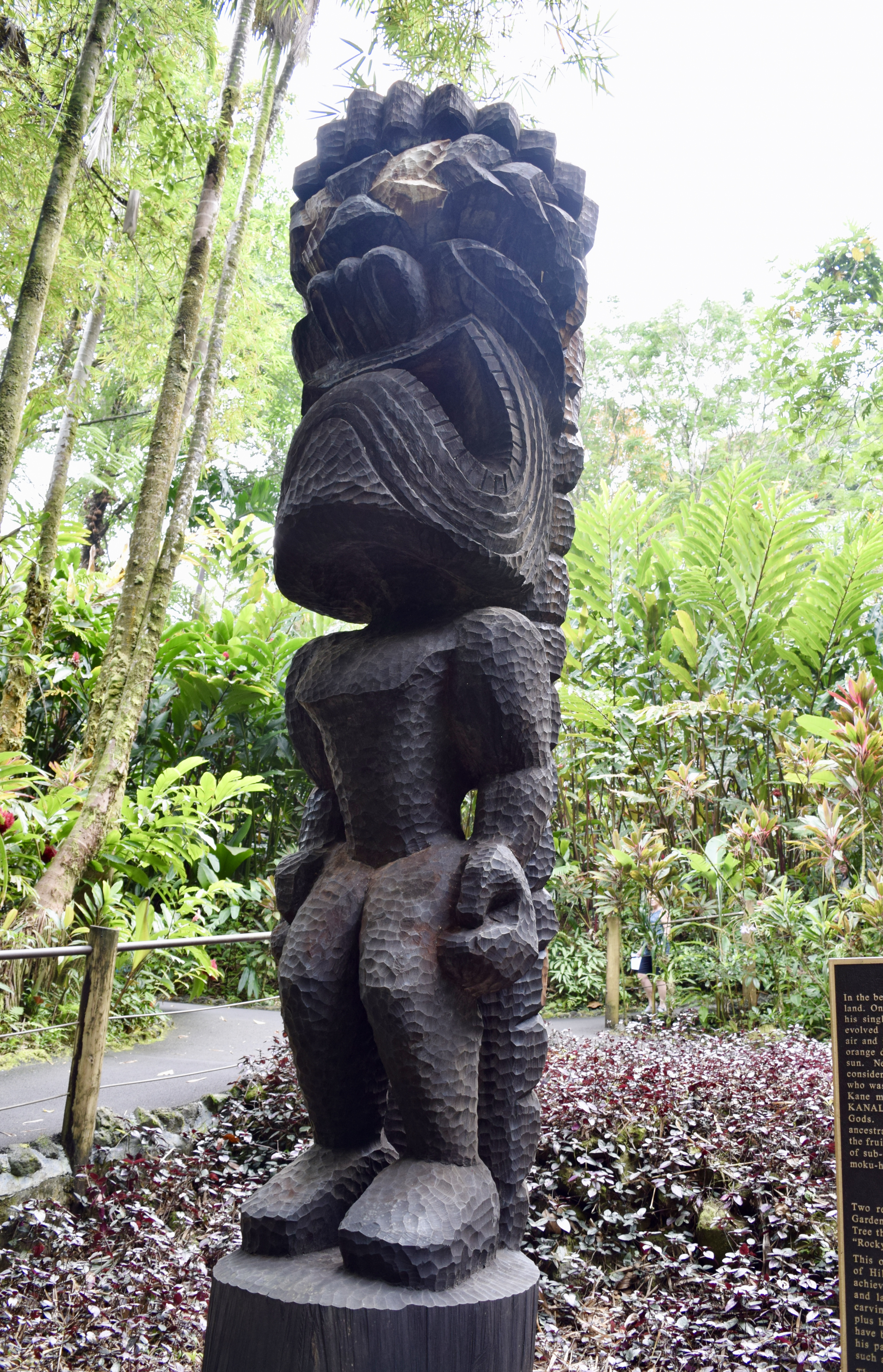
Kū sculpture, monkeypod wood, Hawaii Tropical Botanical Garden

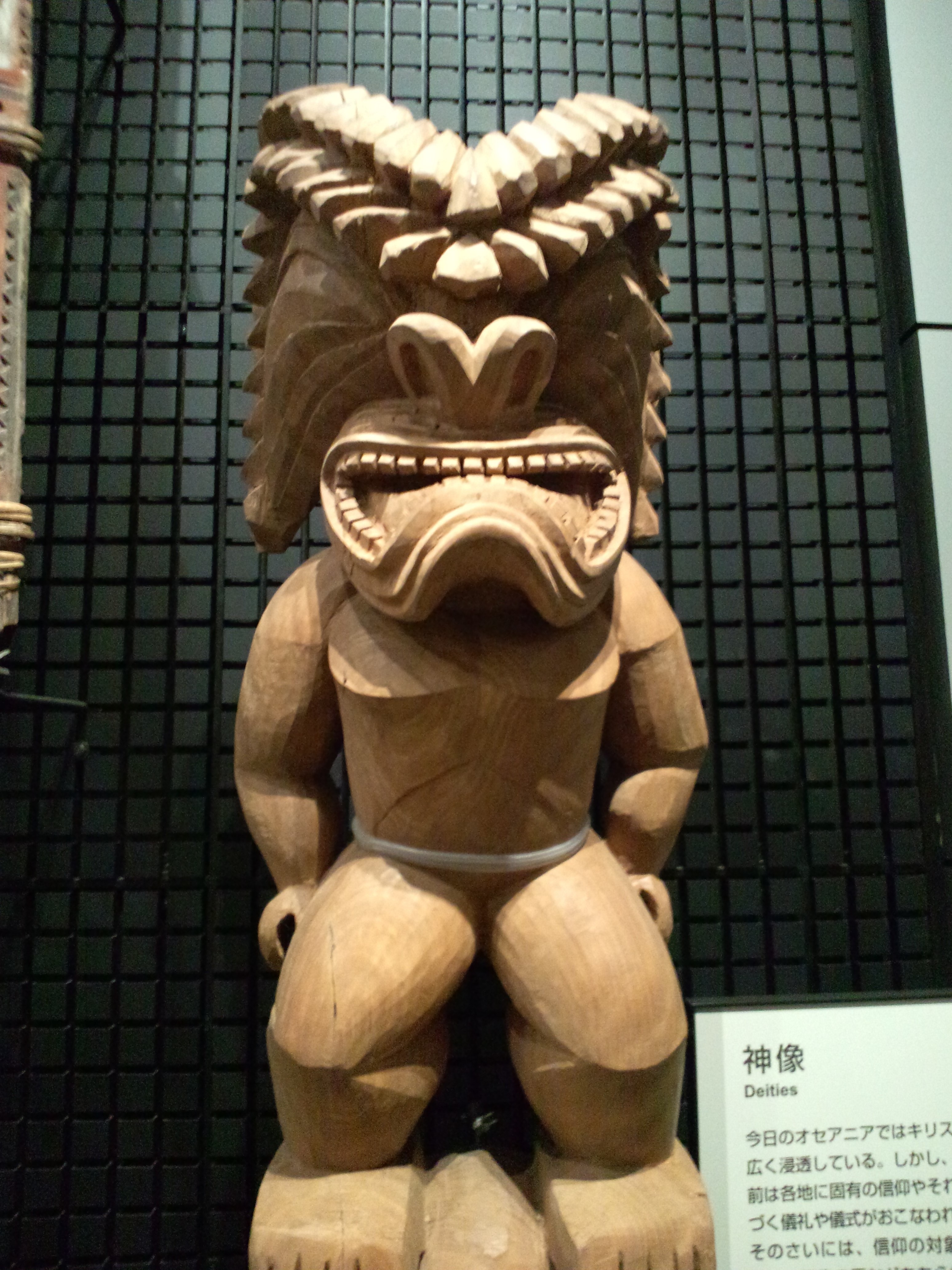
Sculpture of Kū, from the National Museum of Ethnology in Osaka

Also known as Akua, he was the god of war, politics, farming and fishing. As the husband of the goddess Hina, it has been supposedly suggested a form of complementary dualism exists, as the word kū in the Hawaiian language means "to stand" while one meaning of hina is "to fall". However, this assertion remains unsupported by evidence from other Polynesian languages which distinguish the original "ng" and "n". The Hina in New Zealand mythology, for example, is associated with the moon, rather than Hinga, "fallen down". Thus, the Hawaiian name "Hina" is likely more connected to the other Polynesian meanings of Hina, denoting a silvery-grey color like that of Mahina (i.e., the Moon in the Hawaiian language). As primordial gods who have existed for eternity, Kū, Kāne, and Lono caused light to shine in upon the world.

== Guardian statues of King Kamehameha I ==
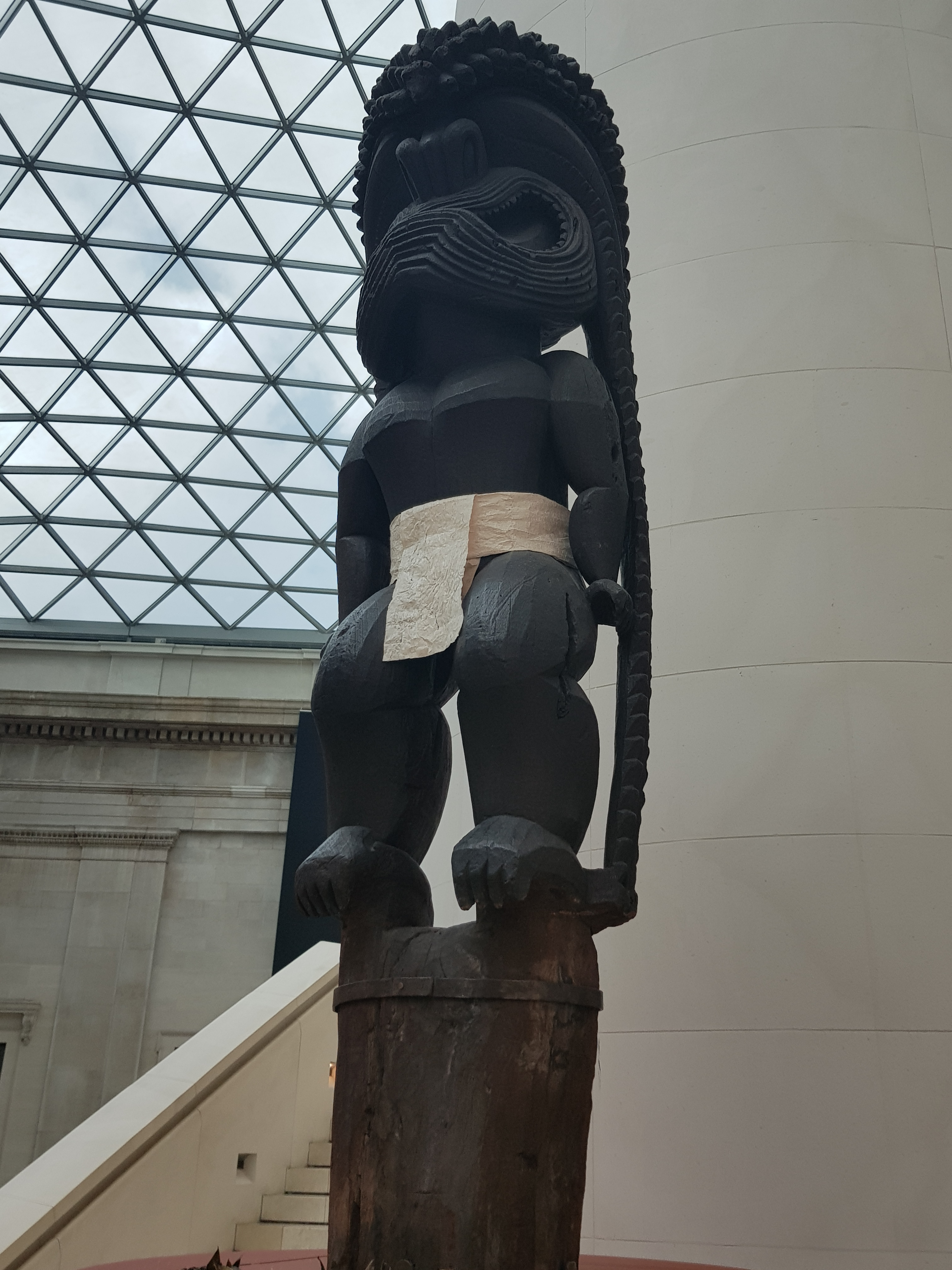
Kū guardian statue of King Kamehameha I on display at the British Museum

Kūkaʻilimoku was the guardian of Kamehameha I, who unified the Hawaiian archipelago under one ruler and established the Hawaiian kingdom. He had monuments erected to Kūkaʻilimoku at the Hōlualoa Bay royal complex as well as his residence at Kamakahonu, both in the district of Kona, Hawaiʻi. Three colossal statues of the god Kū were reunited for the first time in almost 200 years at the Bishop Museum in Honolulu in 2010. They were dedicated by Kamehameha I at one of his temples on the archipelago in the late eighteenth or early nineteenth centuries. These very rare statues (no others are known extant) were later acquired by the Bishop Museum, the Peabody Essex Museum in Salem, Massachusetts, and the British Museum in London. One feathered god image in the Bishop Museum is thought to be Kamehameha I's own image of his god. However it is still unclear whether all feathered god images represent Kū.

== Kinolau (body forms) ==
In the animal world Kū is believed to embody the forms of Manō (shark), Kanaka (man), ʻIo (Hawaiian hawk), Niuhi (man-eating shark), ʻĪlio (dog), Moa (chicken) is also for Kane, Iʻa ʻUla (certain red fish). In the plant world, he is believed to embody the forms of ʻIeʻIe (Freycinetia arborea) vine, ʻŌhiʻa Lehua (Metrosideros polymorpha) flower, ʻulu (breadfruit), niu (only the coconut tree trunk), and noni (Morinda citrifolia) fruit.

== See also ==
- Tūmatauenga, Māori war deity
- Kūaliʻi, 17th century warrior chief of Oʻahu
- Kailua-Kona, whose lighthouse was built on land known as Kūkaʻilimoku Point
