= Kanaloa =

Hawaiian god of ocean, healing, and long travels

- Underworld
- Symbol: squid or octopus
- Gender: male

In the traditions of ancient Hawaiʻi, Kanaloa is a god symbolized by the squid or by the octopus, and is typically associated with Kāne. It is also an alternative name for the island of Kahoʻolawe.

In legends and chants, Kāne and Kanaloa are portrayed as complementary powers. For example, whereas Kāne was called during the canoe building, Kanaloa was called while the canoe was being sailed. Likewise, Kāne governed the northern edge of the ecliptic while Kanaloa governed its southern edge. Kanaloa is "the subconscious to Kāne's conscious". Kanaloa is also traditionally depicted as an ocean god, hence his association with seamanship, or cephalopods. However, there are also interpretations that see Kanaloa as subordinate to Kāne. In the Kumulipo, Kanaloa is born alongside Kāne and the first man, Kiʻi.

Kanaloa is also considered to be the god of the Underworld and a teacher of magic. Legends state that he became the leader of the first group of spirits "spit out" by the gods. In time, he led them in a rebellion in which the spirits were defeated by the gods and, as punishment, were thrown in the Underworld. In traditional, pre-contact Hawaiʻi, it was Milu who was the god of the Underworld and death, not Kanaloa; the related Miru traditions of other Polynesian cultures support this.

The Eye of Kanaloa is an esoteric symbol associated with the god in New Age Huna teaching, consisting of a seven-pointed star surrounded by concentric circles that are regularly divided by eight lines radiating from the inner-most circle to the outer-most circle. Huna, as a New Age religion developed in the 20th century by a Caucasian-American founder, bears no relation to the Native Hawaiian Religion. Native Hawaiians reject "Huna" as a mishmash of Hawaiian elements with European religious metaphysical ideas.

== As a namesake ==
After Kanaloa, one prince was named — he was a son of the Chief Kanipahu and one of his consorts, either Hualani or Alaʻikauakoko.

== See also ==
- Tangaroa, the Māori god of the sea.
- Tagaloa Samoan mythology
- Tangaloa Tongan mythology
- Taʻaroa Tahitian mythology
- Te Wheke-a-Muturangi, a monstrous octopus in NZ Māori and French Polynesian lore.

== Sources ==
- Beckwith, Martha Warren (1982). Hawaiian Mythology. University of Hawaii Press. ISBN 978-0-8248-0514-2.
- P. Turner & C. R. Coulter, Dictionary of Ancient Deities (Oxford University Press: New York, 2001).
- Au, Jane (December 2018). He Hulikoʻa Kanaloa- Seeking the Depths of Kanaloa (Thesis). hdl:10125/62774.
