= Wākea =

Hawaiian sky god

- Sky father
- Gender: Male
- Parents: Kahiko (father); Kupulanakehao (mother)
- Consorts: Papahānaumoku; Hoʻohokukalani
- Offspring: Hoʻohokukalani

In the Hawaiian religion, Wākea, the Sky father, weds Papahānaumoku, the earth mother. The two are considered the parent couple of the ruling chiefs of Hawaii.

Wākea was the eldest son of Kahiko ("Ancient One"), who lived in Olalowaia. He is the ancestor of the aliʻi (nobility of Hawaii), the ruling class that make up the aristocracy known as the noho ali‘i o Hawai‘i (ruling chiefs of Hawai‘i). Wākea is the grandson of Welaahilaninui. The priests and common people come from his brothers, one of whom was called Makuʻu.

Wākea means expansive space, zenith, or heaven and Papa means foundation or surface; together, they create a symbol of land and sky or heaven and earth. Departed souls were believed to travel to the home of Wākea. If they proved themselves pure, they would remain in his realm's comfort, but if otherwise they were sent to Lua-o-Milu.

Wākea's first high priest was called Komoʻawa.

When Wākea was on Earth in ancient times, he was a High Chief.

== Consorts ==
In one legend, Wākea lives in Hihiku and marries Papahānaumoku, who is a princess of Olalo-i-mehani and a granddaughter of Princess Kaoupe-alii. The Hawaiian Islands were created by Wākea and Papahānaumoku. Their daughter was Hoʻohokukalani, who was a mother of Haloa by Wākea.

== Family ==
In the genealogies, Wākea and Papahānaumoku are 37th in the Kumuhonua genealogy, and 28th in the Kumuʻuli. Kumuhonua, the ancestor of the Kumuhonua genealogy, was believed to be the first man in one tradition.

Together, Papahānaumoku and Wākea created Hawaiʻi, Maui, Kauaʻi, and Ho’ohokukalani.

After Wākea committed incest with his daughter, Ho’ohokukalani, she gave birth to Haloa-naka-lau-kapalili, meaning trembling long stalk. It was a stillborn baby, which they later planted and became the first kalo or taro, a staple of the Hawaiian diet. After Haloa-naka, Ho’ohokukalani gave birth to another child named Haloa, meaning long stalk, and he became the first kanaka or Hawaiian person.

The relationship between Haloa-naka and Haloa describes the balance of relationships between the land and the people that live in it. Haloa-naka, as the elder sibling, is responsible for the well-being of their younger siblings, that of which being Haloa. As Kalo, Haloa-naka upholds this by providing sustainance for the people, while the people take care of their older sibling by ensuring the life of the Kalo. Likewise, it is also inappropriate to argue in front of Kalo at any time as well as it is not allowed to argue in front of your older siblings, nor elders. Wākea also had an affair with Goddesses Hina and Ka'ula while Papa was in Kahiki to create the islands of Molokaʻi and Lānaʻi. Papa later returned and was aware of Wākea's affair, so she gained revenge by sleeping with Lua to create the island of Oʻahu.

Later on, Wākea reunites with Papahānaumoku and they create Kauaʻi, Niʻihau, Lehua, and Kaʻula.

In one tradition, the first person on Earth was the woman Laʻilaʻi. She and her husband Kealiʻiwahilani are the parents of Kahiko, the father of Wākea. Wākea made the land and sea from the calabash or gourd (‘ipu) of Papahānaumoku. He threw it up high, and it became the heavens. He made the rain from its juice and from the seeds he made the sun, moon, and stars.

== Gender roles ==
Wanting to sleep with his daughter, Wākea made a bargain with his high priest, Komo’awa, to make Papahānaumoku go away for four nights. In her seclusion, it was kapu or restricted for her to eat certain foods; a tradition known as ʻaikapu, which was a sacred eating arrangement established by Wākea. The purpose of the ʻaikapu was to separate the women from the men. In traditional Hawaiian society, men were responsible for cooking.

Examples of some foods that Hawaiian women could not eat:

- Pigs
- Coconuts
- Bananas
- Red colored fish
- Certain seafood

== See also ==
- Atea, Marquesan god of light
- Vatea, a god from Mangaia in the Cook Islands
- Rangi and Papa, primordial parents in Māori tradition
- Prince Kalaninuiamamao and his daughter-granddaughter Alapaiwahine (case similar to Wākea and his daughter)
