= Lono =

Hawaiian god of fertility, agriculture, rainfall, music, and peace

- fertility, agriculture, rainfall, music and peace.
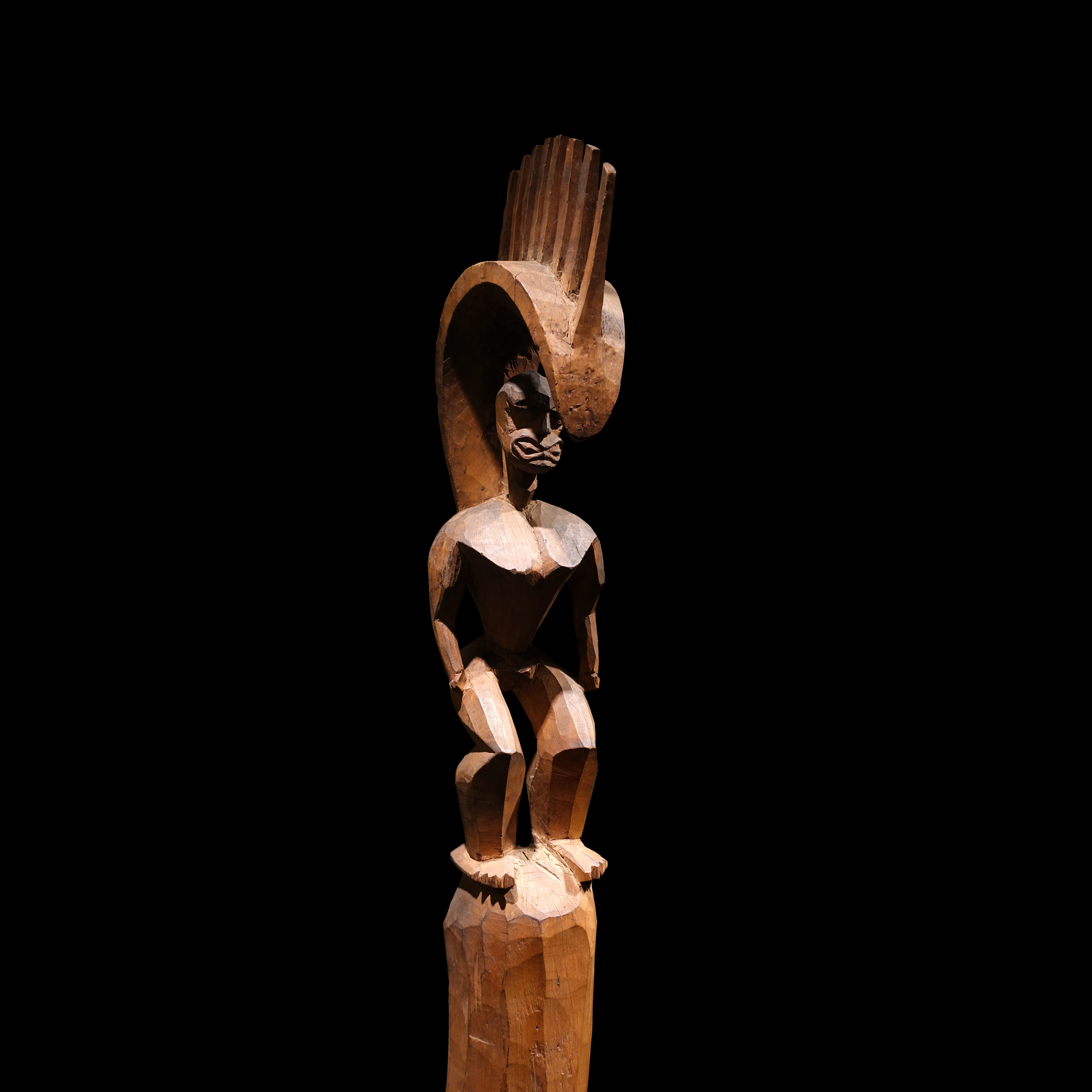
- Late 18th-century figure of Lono, on display at Musée du Quai Branly (Paris).
- Gender: male

Genealogy
- Born: near the graves of Keawe

In Hawaiian religion, the god Lono is associated with fertility, agriculture, rainfall, music and peace. In one of the many Hawaiian stories of Lono, he is a fertility and music god who descended to Earth on a rainbow to marry Laka. In agricultural and planting traditions, Lono was identified with rain and food plants. He was one of the four gods (with Kū, Kāne, and Kāne's twin brother Kanaloa) who existed before the world was created. Lono was also the god of peace. In his honor, the great annual festival of the Makahiki was held. During this period (from October through February), war and unnecessary work was kapu (taboo).

In Hawaiian weather terminology, the winter Kona storms that bring rain to leeward areas are associated with Lono. Lono brings on the rains and dispenses fertility, and as such was sometimes referred to as Lono-makua (Lono the Provider). Ceremonies went through a monthly and yearly cycle. For 8 months of the year, the luakini (temple) was dedicated to Ku-with strict kapus. Four periods (kapu pule) each month required strict ceremonies. Violators could have their property seized by priests or overlord chiefs, or be sentenced to death for serious breaches.

== Lono and Captain Cook ==
There is some debate to whether Native Hawaiians perceived Captain James Cook as Lono's incarnation, which may have later caused Cook's death (see Third voyage of James Cook). A Hawaiian god or "an ak[ua] is a being of nature, one of immense power, which may be an invisible spirit or a living person." It would not be abnormal for an akua to journey across an ocean, or physically appear, compared to the Abrahamic god.

In Martha Beckwith's telling Cook was perceived to be the god Lono. It was traditionally held that the god Lono had appeared as a human who then established games and the annual taxing. Before departing to "Kahiki", he promised to return "by sea on the canoes ʻAuwaʻalalua". An unidentified queen identified it as a "Spanish man of war", recalling the alleged arrival of a Spanish galleon. Mary Pukui interpreted this as "very large double canoe", from ʻAu[hau]-waʻa-l[o]a-lua. However, Pukui may have been referring to the Portuguese man o' war, which Hawaiians called ʻAuwaʻalalua.

Noenoe Silva offers the alternate perspective that Cook may not have been perceived as an akua. Instead "Cook may also just have been nicknamed Lono because his ship reminded Kanaka of the mo'olelo, and because 'Cook' was impossible to pronounce."

== Other Lonos (different cultures and beliefs) ==
Better known to the Hawaiian mythology is an earlier Lono-i-ka-makahiki from the ʻUmi line of ruling Hawaii Island aliʻi (i.e., chiefs, royalty). This Lono was born and raised near the graves of Keawe and his descendants, which were near the place of Captain Cook's monument. This Lono may have cultivated the arts of warfare and puns as well as riddle games and spear-dodging games for the Makahiki.

However, it is unlikely either late ruling chiefs on the ʻUmi line was the mythological Lono who departed to Kahiki. Both chiefs were born in Hawaii, and no legend tells of either of them sailing away with a promise to return. A more plausible candidate for the god Lono is the legendary Laʻa-mai-Kahiki (i.e., the "Sacred-one-from-Tahiti), who purportedly lived several centuries earlier.

Laʻa came as a younger member of the Moikeha family of North Tahiti, older members of whom had settled earlier in the Hawaiian archipelago. He brought with him a small hand-drum, and a flute for the hula. Upon his arrival, the locals heard his flute and the rhythm of the new drumbeat, believing it was the god Kupulupulu.

Kupulupulu was worshiped as god of the hula, who also took the form of the flowering lehua tree as well as the god of native fauna that sustained early Polynesian settlers. Especially on Oahu, this Laʻa-mai-kahiki took wives in various districts. Oahu Island was the stronghold of Lono's worship, where many families claimed descent from La'a. He seems to have sailed back to Tahiti at least once before his final departure. This traveler of a great Tahitian family, who appeared like a god, enriched the New Year festivals with games and drama, ultimately influencing the Hawaiians into believing he was a god.

== See also ==
- Domesticated plants and animals of Austronesia
- Kamapua'a
- Rongo, Māori god of cultivated plants
- Quetzalcoatl, whom the Aztecs supposedly identified with Hernán Cortés
