= List of Living Treasures of Hawaii =

The Living Treasures of Hawaiʻi program was created in 1976 by the Buddhist temple Honpa Hongwanji Mission of Hawaii to honor residents of Hawaii. It was inspired by the Living National Treasures of Japan award, and is awarded annually.

The criteria for selection are, "First, the designee must demonstrate continuous growth in his or her field; second, the potential Living Treasure must have made significant contributions toward a more humane and fraternal society (and this perhaps is the most important criteria); and finally, he or she must have shown an on-going striving for excellence and a high level of accomplishment." Honorees are nominated by members of the general public by August 1 of each year, and chosen by a committee designated by the temple.

These are the people who have been so honored.

== 1970s ==
=== 1976 ===
- Charles Kenn

=== 1977 ===
- Wright Elemakule Bowman Sr.
- Jean Charlot
- Johanna Drew Cluney
- Samuel Hoyt Elbert
- Kenneth Pike Emory
- Iolani Luahine
- Rosalie Lokalia Lovelle Montgomery
- Mary Kawena Pukui

=== 1978 ===
- Theodore Kelsey

=== 1979 ===
- Abraham Kahikina Akaka
- Emma DeFries
- John Dominis Holt IV
- Edward Leilani Kamae
- Edith Kekuhikuhi-i-pu'uone'ona'ali'i-o-kohala Kenao Kanaka'ole
- Clorinda Low Lucas
- Aldyth Vernon Morris
- Alice Kuʻuleialohapoʻinaʻole Kanakaoluna Nāmakelua
- Gabby Pahinui

== 1980s ==
=== 1980 ===
- Gabriel I
- Maxine Hong Kingston
- Donald Kilolani Mitchell
- Pilahi Paki
- Alfred Preis

=== 1981 ===
- Solomon Kekipi Bright Sr.
- Oswald Bushnell
- Leo Ohai
- Leon J. Edel
- William H. Meinecke
- Isamu Noguchi
- Juliet Rice Wichman

=== 1982 ===
- Juliette May Fraser
- Annie Lehua Asam Kanahele
- Richard Lyman Jr.
- Silver Kiniohi Piliwale
- James Ka'upena Wong Jr.

=== 1983 ===
- Homer Ahu'ula Hayes
- Rubellite Kawena Kinney Johnson
- Zaneta Ho'oululahui Cambra Richards
- Morrnah Nalamaku Simeona
- Emily Kau'i Zuttermeister

=== 1984 ===
- Satoru Abe
- Bumpei Akaji
- Irmgard Farden Aluli
- Francis Haar
- Herb Kawainui Kane
- Tadashi Sato
- Emma Kapi'olani Farden Sharpe

=== 1985 ===
- Gladys Kamakakuokalani Ainoa Brandt
- May A. Moir
- Sarah M. Wood Nalua'i
- Katashi Nose
- Soichi Sakamoto
- Allan Frederic Saunders

=== 1986 ===
- Claude F. DuTeil
- Edward L. Kealanahele
- Milton M. Howell
- Margaret Machado

=== 1987 ===
- Agnes C. Conrad
- Agnes Kalaniho'okaha Cope
- Edmund M. K. Enomoto
- Joe C. Harper
- Claude Horan
- David Kuraoka
- John Keolamaka'ainanakalahuiokalani Lake
- Kahauanu Lake
- Toshiko Takaezu

=== 1988 ===
- Kenneth F. Brown
- David Kauweloa Kaupu
- Murray Turnbull

=== 1989 ===
- Reiko Mochinaga Brandon
- Healani Onohiaulani Chilton Doane
- Ehan Numata
- Reuben Tam
- Betty Tseng Yu-Ho Ecke

== 1990s ==
=== 1990 ===
- Richard Kekuni Blaisdell
- Edmond Lee Browning
- Frances Patches McKinnon Damon Holt
- Kyo Kawabata

=== 1991 ===
- Daniel G. Chun
- Dwight Pauahi Kauahikaua
- Moses Kapalekilahao Keale Sr.
- Puanani Kanemura Van Dorpe

=== 1992 ===
- Helen Hoakalei Kamau'u
- David Nu'uhiwa Enoka Kaohelauli'i
- Marie Emilia Leilehua McDonald
- Harry Seisho Nakasone
- Matsuno Yasui

=== 1993 ===
- Elaine Arita
- Yoshiko Matsuda
- Stewart Valentine Medeiros Sr.
- Edith Hanae Tanaka
- Shige Yamada

=== 1994 ===
- Todd Toshiaki Akita
- Daniel J. Dever
- Yoshiaki Fujitani
- Roy T. Fukumura
- Deborah Kepola Kekalia
- Yukio Ozaki
- Marion Grace Saunders

=== 1995 ===
- Don Ho
- Sally Fletcher Murchison
- Leone Kamana Okamura

=== 1996 ===
- Wallace F. Froiseth
- Hiroki Morinoue
- Shinichi Suzuki

=== 1997 ===
- Robert Baker Aitken
- Henry A. Auwae
- Martha Kaumakaokalani Aoe Poepoe Hohu
- Ralph Chikato Honda
- Iwao Mizuta

=== 1998 ===
- Hubert Victor Everly
- George Sanford Kanahele
- Beatrice Kapua'okalani Hilmer Krauss
- Jerry Okimoto
- Vladimir Ossipoff
- Ruth Tabrah

=== 1999 ===
- Earl E. Bakken
- Samuel S.A. Cooke
- Shimeji Ryusaki Kanazawa
- Yutaka Kimura
- Abraham St. Chad Pi'ianai'a
- Adam A. "Bud" Smyser

== 2000s ==
=== 2000 ===
- Glenna Fusae Kimura Ewing
- James K. Fujikawa
- Ah Quon McElrath
- Rose Nakamura
- Charles Nainoa Thompson

=== 2001 ===
- Ronald E. Bright
- Sean Kekamakupa'a Lee Loy Browne
- Rocky Ka'iouliokahihikolo 'Ehu Jensen
- Bob Krauss
- Jesse "Takamiyama" Kuhaulua
- Clarence K.M. Lee

=== 2002 ===
- Alfred Bloom
- Takeshi Fujita
- Takashi Nonaka
- Lynne Yoshiko Nakasone
- Yoshihiko Sinoto
- Myron "Pinky" Thompson

=== 2003 ===
- Beatrice Freitas
- Mary Louise Kekuewa
- Albert H. Miyasato
- Margaret Y. Oda
- Ted T. Tsukiyama
- Masaru Yokouchi, "Pundy"

=== 2004 ===
- Rev. Mitsuo Aoki
- Genoa Keawe
- Pat Namaka Bacon
- Fujio Matsuda
- Edith Kawelohea McKinzie
- Tau Moe

=== 2005 ===
- Isabella Aiona Abbott
- Gabriel "Gabe" Baltazar Jr.
- Momi Cazimero
- Thomas Klobe
- Sione Tui'one Pulotu
- Benjamin B.C. Young

=== 2006 ===
- Richard K. Paglinawan
- James T. Kunichika
- Carol Kouchi Yotsuda
- Edward T. Ka'anana, "Uncle Eddie"
- Walter H. Keli'iokekai Paulo, "Uncle Walter"
- Terry Shintani

=== 2007 ===
- Malia Craver
- George Naʻope
- Terence Rogers
- Norman Sakata
- Barbara Barnard Smith
- Dorothy "Aunty Dottie" Thompson
- Wally Yonamine

=== 2008 ===
- Edwin Mahiai Beamer
- Charles P.K.M. Burrows
- Rev. Sam Cox
- Benjamin Kodama
- Elsie T. Tanaka

=== 2009 ===
- Amy Agbayani
- Puanani Sonoda Burgess
- Sister Joan Chatfield
- Bert N. Nishimura
- Nalani Olds

== 2010s ==
=== 2010 ===
- S. Stanley Okamoto
- Elizabeth Kawohiokalani Ellis Jenkins
- Paul Weissich
- Rev. Toshihide Numata
- Patti Lyons

=== 2011 ===
- Josephine Kaukali Fergerstrom
- Dr. Claire Ku’uleilani Hughes
- Masaru Oshiro
- Dr. Jack H. Scaff Jr.,
- Dr. Livingston M.F. Wong, MD, FACS

=== 2012 ===
- Barbara Kawakami
- Ben Finney
- Goro Arakawa
- Gordon Mark
- Lynette Paglinawan

=== 2013 ===
- Dennis Kauahi
- Nola A. Nahulu
- Michael Nakasone
- Oswald K. Stender
- Gary Washburn

=== 2014 ===
- Ida Keliʻiokalani Chun
- Samuel ʻOhukaniʻohiʻa Gon III
- Robert Mitsuru Hamada
- Arthur and Rene Kimura
- Chikai Yosemori

=== 2015 ===
- Haunani Apoliona
- Blossom Puanani Alama-Tom
- Laura Ruby
- Bernice Hirai
- Paulette Kahalepuna
- Barry Taniguchi

=== 2016 ===
- Paul Leland Breese
- Sooriya Kumar
- Puakea M. Nogelmeier
- Dennis Masaaki Ogawa
- Lillian Noda Yajima

=== 2017 ===
- Ryokan Ara
- Beatrice Kanahele Dawson
- Nobuko Kida
- Roy Sakuma
- George Yokoyama

=== 2018 ===
- Mitchell Eli
- Mary Jo Freshley
- Hailama Farden
- Gordon Umialiloalahanauokalakaua Kai
- Takejiro Higa

=== 2019 ===
- John M. Hara
- Earl Kawa'a
- Gertrude Yukie Tsutsumi
- James T. Yagi

== 2020s ==
=== 2020 ===
- Robert Cazimero
- Larry Kimura
- Carolee Nishi
- Sachie Saigusa

=== 2021 ===
Not awarded in 2021, during COVID-19 pandemic

=== 2022 ===
- Kenny Endo
- Patrick Kirch
- Kealiʻi Reichel

=== 2023 ===
- Fred Keakaokalani Cachola Jr.
- Frederick S. Nonaka
- Hiromi Nakai Peterson
- Peter T. Young

=== 2024 ===
- Davianna Pomaikai McGregor
- Douglas D.L. Chong
- Sarah Ilialoha Ayat Keahi
- Julian Keikilani Ako
- Ricardo D. Trimillos
