= Max Freedom Long =

American writer (1890–1971)

Max Freedom Long (October 26, 1890 – September 23, 1971) was an American novelist and New Age writer.

== Early life and career ==
Max Freedom Long was born on October 26, 1890, in Sterling, Colorado to Toby Albert Long and his wife Jessie Diffendaffer. At the time of the 1910 census he was working as a photographer in his hometown, and was living in his grandfather's household with his parents. He attended Los Angeles State Normal School from September 1914 to June 1916, and graduated with an Associate of Arts (two-year) degree in general education. After graduating, he worked briefly as an auto-mechanic in Los Angeles.

In 1917, Long moved to the island of Hawaii to teach in elementary schools around the big island. He moved to Honolulu in 1920 and lived there until 1932, while he worked in, and later owned, a photography store. In 1920, he married an English woman named Jane Jessie Rae, the proprietor of the Hotel Davenport in Honolulu. When he arrived in Hawaii, he claimed that some Native Hawaiians were practicing what he called magic.

In the mid-1930s, Long relocated to Orange County, California and began to focus on writing books inspired by his experiences in Hawaii. He married a second time while in California.

== Invention of Huna ==
Long decided to call his compilation of teachings Huna, because one meaning of the word is "hidden secret". He wrote that he derived it from the word kahuna, meaning "priests and master craftsmen who ranked near the top of the social scale". Long published a series of books on Huna starting in 1936, and founded an organization called the Huna Fellowship in 1945.

There are no accepted Hawaiian sources – Malo, Kamakau, 'I'i, or Kepelino – that refer to the word Huna as a tradition of esoteric learning.

Max Freedom Long wrote that he obtained many of his case studies and his ideas about what to look for in kahuna magic from the Director of the Bishop Museum in Honolulu, William Brigham. There is no credible evidence that the two men met. Even if they did, Brigham was not an expert on kahunas and did not document in his own writings any of the incidents Long ascribed to him, including walking on hot lava. In his letters and manuscripts, Brigham stated that Hawaiians were "an inferior race", and implied they were lazy. He referred to Queen Lili'uokalani as a "she devil", "squaw", and "nigger".

Native Hawaiian scholar Charles W. Kenn, a Living Treasure of Hawai'i recognized in the Hawaiian community as a kahuna and expert in Hawaiian history and traditions, was friendly with Max Freedom Long but said, "While this Huna study is an interesting study, … it is not, and never was Hawaiian."

== Later life ==
Max Freedom Long stopped issuing bulletins in late 1970 due to poor health. He died at his home in Vista, California on September 23, 1971, from a self-inflicted shotgun wound to his head. He had been suffering from a bone cancer for a few years at that time, and was in constant pain in his final months. He was a believer in voluntary euthanasia.

== Max Freedom Long Library and Museum ==
Prior to his death, Long's papers and library became part of the Max Freedom Long Library and Museum at the Huna Research Center at Fort Worth, Texas. It was established by a student named Dolly Ware, who inherited Long's library. After Dolly Ware's death in 2012, parts of the collection were sold to antiquarian book dealers. Other parts became the possession of E. Otha Wingo, who was a direct successor of Long's Huna tradition. Parts of the collection of the original Library and Museum have since been reconstituted at Valdosta State University's Archives and Special Collections as part of their New Age Movements, Occultism, and Spiritualism Research Library. The remaining pieces are being sought by the curator of the collection, Guy Frost of Valdosta State University's Odum Library.

== Works by Max Freedom Long ==
=== Huna related works ===
- Discovering the Ancient Magic, 1936
- The Secret Science Behind Miracles, 1948 (ISBN 0875160476)
- Huna Bulletins, 1948–1971
- Mana or Vital Force, 1949
- The Secret Behind Miracles, 1953 (ISBN 0875160468)
- Growing into Light, 1955 (ISBN 0875160433)
- Self-Suggestion and The New Huna Theory of Mesmerism and Hypnosis, 1958
- Psychometric Analysis, 1959
- Huna Code in Religions, 1965 (ISBN 0875164951)
- Short Talks on Huna, 1978 (ISBN 0910764026)
- Recovering the Ancient Magic, 1978 (ISBN 0910764018) (originally published in 1936)
- What Jesus Taught in Secret, 1983 (ISBN 0875165109)
- Tarot Card Symbology, 1983 (ISBN 0910764077)

=== Hawaiian Detective Komako novels ===
- Murder Between Dark and Dark, 1939
- The Lava Flow Murders, 1940
- Death Goes Native, 1941
