= Huna (New Age) =

New Age religious movement

Huna (Hawaiian for "secret") is a new religious movement by the New Age practitioner Max Freedom Long (1890–1971), founded in 1936, professing to be inspired from the spiritual practices of the ancient Hawaiian kahunas (priests), and includes his metaphysical principles. However, contemporary scholars consider the Huna as a blend of spiritual practices from various cultures, with roots in New Thought and Theosophy rather than in traditional Hawaiian beliefs.

Long claimed that he had rediscovered some ancient spiritual principle, not just about Hawaiian religion, but one that linked back to ancient Indian and Egyptian religions. Huna emphasizes practical living and harmony with three levels of consciousness or selves, a low, middle, and higher self, which were supposedly recognized by ancient kahunas.

Long had been interested in the spiritual secrets of Hawaiian religion, but he left Hawaii in 1931 without much success. In 1934, he felt a breakthrough, a revelation of secrets encoded in the Hawaiian language, and called the religious system he developed from this revelation Huna (the Hawaiian word for secret) and wrote his first book in 1936 to chronicle his beliefs.

In 1945, Long founded Huna Research, and in 1953, published The Secret Science at Work as a Huna textbook, and in 1965 The Huna Codes in Religions, examining parallels between his system and religions such as Hinduism, Buddhism and Christianity.

== History ==
Max Freedom Long went to Hawaii in 1917 to work as an elementary school teacher. He became interested in the religious beliefs and practices of the ancient kahunas and modern practitioners of traditional, indigenous Hawaiian religion, but none of the ceremonial people talked to him so he was unable to penetrate to the inner workings of this religion. In the Hawaiian language, the term kahuna is used for any expert. Kahuna include experts in diagnosing illness, herbal medicine, canoe building, temple building, wood carving, star-gazing, agriculture, and others.

Long left Hawaii in 1931, convinced that he would never learn these secrets. In 1934, he woke with a revelation that the secrets were encoded into the Hawaiian language itself. He called the religious system he developed from this revelation Huna (the Hawaiian word for secret) and wrote his first book in 1936 to chronicle his beliefs.

In 1945, Long founded Huna Research. In 1953, he published The Secret Science at Work as a Huna textbook, and in 1965 The Huna Codes in Religions, examining parallels between his invented system and religions such as Hinduism, Buddhism and Christianity.

== Principles and beliefs ==
=== Max Long ===
Long believed he had discovered an ancient truth, not just about Hawaiian spirituality but linking back to India and ancient Egypt. He believed Hawaiians were a lost tribe of Berbers, and wrote that spiritual adepts migrated to Hawai‘i from Egypt, passing on to the priests of India some of their basic beliefs. Long also linked Huna to Theosophy and New Thought movements of the time, writing that Christian Scientists understood positive thinking better than any group he knew, and encouraged his readers to subscribe to Unity Church’s magazine, Daily Word.

Huna emphasizes practical living and harmony with three levels of consciousness or selves, a low, middle, and higher self, which were supposedly recognized by ancient kahunas. Long called these selves the unihipili (subconscious, inner, emotional, intuitive), uhane (waking consciousness, rational) and aumakua (super-conscious, connection with the divine). These are not the Hawaiian meanings of these words, which are traditionally defined as "the spirit of a dead person", "spirit" or "dirge", and "family or personal gods" respectively. (Note: For full, unabbreviated definitions, please consult the cited dictionary references for each term.)

In addition, Long redefined the Hawaiian concept of mana, (privileged as a divine power in traditional Hawaiian belief), and presented it instead as a vitalizing life force, which can, with knowledge of the three selves, be used in a manner of "personal empowerment" to heal body and mind and achieve life goals.

=== Later teachers ===
Subsequent Huna teachers have placed the movement firmly in the New Age, with Serge King claiming that Huna came originally from aliens from the Pleiades who were remnants of the mythical advanced civilizations of Mu or Lemuria, and Pila Chiles associating the islands with the New Age versions/interpretations of chakras, vortexes and ley lines.

According to critics, Serge King misappropriated and attempted to redefine the names of three Hawaiian gods for his idea of "the three selves": "Ku," "Lono," and "Kane".

King listed seven principles of Huna, which are given in the table below. King also calls what he does "shamanism" and cites "West African shamanism" as an influence.

Seven principles of Huna
| Hawaiian | Traditional definition | King's definition |
|---|---|---|
| ʻIke | To see, know, perceive | "The world is what you think it is." |
| Kala | To free, loosen | "There are no limits." |
| Makia | Motto, purpose | "Energy flows where attention goes." |
| Manawa | Time, season, date | "Now is the moment of power." |
| Aloha | Love, compassion | "To love is to be happy with (someone or something)." |
| Mana | Supernatural power | "All power comes from within." |
| Pono | Goodness, morality | "Effectiveness is the measure of truth." |

== Reaction ==
Max Freedom Long wrote that he obtained many of his case studies and his ideas about what to look for in kahuna magic from the Director of the Bishop Museum in Honolulu, William Brigham. According to an article in the peer-reviewed Hawaiian Journal of History, there is no credible evidence that the two men met. Even if they did, Brigham was not an expert on kahunas and did not document in his own writings any of the incidents Long ascribed to him, including walking on hot lava. In his letters and manuscripts, Brigham stated that Hawaiians were "an inferior race," and implied they were lazy. He referred to Queen Liliʻuokalani as a "she devil," "squaw," and "nigger."

Native Hawaiian scholar Charles Kenn, recognized in the Hawaiian community as a kahuna and expert in Hawaiian history and traditions, was friendly with Max Freedom Long but said, "While this Huna study is an interesting study, … it is not, and never was Hawaiian."

Pali Jae Lee, a research librarian at the Bishop Museum, and author of the classic book, Tales From the Night Rainbow, conducted extensive research on Max Freedom Long and Huna. She concluded, based on her interviews with Hawaiian elders, "Huna is not Hawaiian." Lee cites Theodore Kelsey, a Living Treasure of Hawai'i renowned for his work as a Hawaiian translator who wrote a letter to Long in 1936 (now in the Hawai'i State Archives) criticizing his use of the terms "unihipili" and "aumakua."

Author Nancy Kahalewai, a teacher of lomilomi massage, wrote that "traditional lomilomi practitioners do not teach this philosophy. In fact, most insist that it is not from the native Hawaiian culture at all."

Wells College Professor Lisa Kahaleole Hall, Ph.D., a Native Hawaiian, wrote in a peer-reviewed journal published by the University of Hawai'i that Huna "bears absolutely no resemblance to any Hawaiian worldview or spiritual practice" and calls it part of the "New Age spiritual industry."

Mikael Rothstein, an associate professor of religious history at the University of Copenhagen in Denmark, is the author of several books on religious history and new religious movements. He wrote about Huna in a peer-reviewed anthology:

Rather than integrating Hawaiian religion, however, New Agers seem to carry out a radical reinterpretation of this tradition, or simply invent traditions that were never Hawaiian. ... New Age representations redefine Hawaiian concepts in order to align them to basic New Age trends.

== Organizations ==
Huna Research Inc was founded by Long in 1945. On his death in 1971, he was succeeded as its head by Dr. E Otha Wingo (in accordance with a request by Long), and moved its headquarters to Missouri, where Wingo was a professor. It has fellowships in Canada, Australia, England, Germany and Switzerland, in addition to the United States.

Huna International was formed as a religious order in 1973 by King. It has three branches: Aloha International, Voices of the Earth and Finding Each Other International.

== See also ==
- Declaration on the Rights of Indigenous Peoples
- Divine Science
- Ho'oponopono
- Marlo Morgan
- New religious movement
- Plastic shaman
- Religious Science
- Seicho-No-Ie

== Bibliography ==
- Chai, Makana Risser (2011). "Huna, Max Freedom Long, and the Idealization of William Brigham" (PDF). The Hawaiian Journal of History. 45. Archived from the original (PDF) on 2021-01-18.
- Long, Max Freedom (1948). The Secret Science Behind Miracles. Los Angeles: Kosmon Press. ISBN 978-0-87516-047-4. Republished as Long, M.F. (1954). The Secret Science Behind Miracles (5th ed.). DeVorss. ASIN B004L0HVQQ.
