= Beebe Freitas =

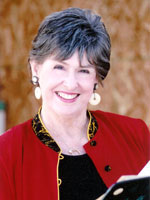

Background information
- Birth name: Beatrice Pauline Botty
- Born: August 28, 1938; Youngstown, Ohio, U.S.
- Died: February 17, 2018 (aged 79); Aina Haina, Oahu, Hawaii
- Occupation: Head of Music – Hawaii Opera Theatre
- Years active: 1954–2018
- Spouse(s): Lewis Pimentel Freitas (m. 1964–; divorce)

Beebe Freitas (née Beatrice Pauline Botty; August 28, 1938 – February 17, 2018) was an American pianist, organist, vocal coach and educator. She was the Head of Music for Hawaii Opera Theatre.

== Life ==
Beebe Freitas was born as Beatrice Pauline Botty in Youngstown, Ohio, to mother Pauline (née Esterhay) and father John Botty. Freitas's father was Pastor of the Hungarian United Presbyterian Church in Youngstown, was born in Hungary and was a naturalized citizen of the United States. Freitas's mother was Dean of Women and Head of the Sociology Department at Youngstown State University and an attorney. Beebe married Lewis Pimentel Freitas on November 30, 1964, and was the mother of Roslyn Kapuamakalaniepaheahe Freitas Catracchia and John Botty Freitas.

Freitas attended South High School in Youngstown and in 1954 was the recipient of a Ford Foundation Early Admissions Scholarship to Oberlin College, Oberlin, Ohio where she received a Bachelor of Arts degree in 1958, studying piano with Edward Mattos. She was awarded a Scholarship in Accompanying from Boston University where she received a Master of Music degree in 1959, studying piano with Alexander Borovsky and music history with Karl Geiringer. Continuing postgraduate education at Juilliard School of Music, New York City, from 1959 to 1962, she studied piano with Beveridge Webster and ensemble music with Louis Persinger, Isadore Cohen, Robert Mann, Luigi Silva and others.

Freitas and her husband moved to Honolulu in 1966 where she was the Head of Music for Hawaii Opera Theatre, organist for the First Presbyterian Church of Honolulu and the Punahou School Chapel Program, and coached privately.

She died at her home in Aina Haina, Hawaii on February 17, 2018.

== Career ==
=== Early years ===
Freitas made her professional debut performing with the Youngstown Symphony Orchestra during their 1955 – '56 season. While an Accompanying Scholarship Masters recipient at Boston University she served as a rehearsal pianist for Charles Munch, Music Director and Conductor of the Boston Symphony, during their 1958 – '59 season and, during the summer of 1959 performed as soloist with the Boston Pops Orchestra, Arthur Fiedler conducting. While at Juilliard she served as the Choral Rehearsal Pianist from 1959 to 1962 and participated in the Opening Performance of the Lincoln Center for the Performing Arts.

Over the next four years she went on to become the rehearsal pianist for the Collegiate Chorale and the Camerata Singers under the direction of Abraham Kaplan, and regularly served as rehearsal pianist for choral works being presented by the New York Philharmonic conducted by Leonard Bernstein, William Steinberg, Joseph Krips and Thomas Schippers. Freitas also was rehearsal accompanist for recordings under Robert Shaw.

=== Honolulu, Hawaii ===
After Freitas and husband Lewis moved to Honolulu, she taught privately and was the organist at Niu Valley's Kilohana Methodist Church under Helen Noh Lee. She joined the faculty of the University of Hawaiʻi at Mānoa Music Department in 1972 teaching piano, accompanying, working with choruses, and coaching opera and music theater workshops.

Freitas began working with Hawaii Opera Theatre (HOT) as rehearsal pianist in 1972 when Robert LaMarchina, then conductor of the Honolulu Symphony Orchestra (recently renamed Hawaii Symphony), initiated regular opera productions. She helped shepherd the transition of the company, as part of the Honolulu Symphony, to being a separate institution, serving at various times as rehearsal pianist, vocal coach, co-Choral Master with Nola Nahulu, Artistic Director, Associate Artistic Director and was Head of Music for the company.

Freitas has performed in recitals with David Shifrin, Tom Boyd, Leonard Rose, Sylvia McNair, Bernard Greenhouse, Yo-Yo Ma, Quinn Kelsey, Maya Hoover, Lawrence Paxton, Sasha Cooke, Leon Williams, Frederica von Stade and others. She was the keyboard specialist with the Honolulu Symphony for thirty years and has performed with many of the professional chamber music groups in the state, including the Galliard String Quartet and the Spring Wind Quintet. She has recorded Sea Dreams, for Lehua Records and keyboards for Rosemary Clooney's last two recordings: "The Last Concert" (2002) and "Best of the Concord Years" (2003). She has served on the boards of several music organizations in Honolulu, including Hawai'i Arts Alliance

== Awards and honors ==
Freitas has received numerous awards and honors, among which are the following:

- 'Oahu Choral Society – Dale R. Noble Award for outstanding contributions to choral music in Hawaii 2014
- Hawaii Arts Alliance – Alfred Preis Award 2005
- Honpa Hongwanji Mission of Hawaii, Living Treasures of Hawaii 2003
- National Society of Arts and Letters, Honolulu Chapter, Roselani Medallion Honoree 2002
- City and County of Honolulu Commission on Culture and the Arts Award
- YWCA of 'Oahu Leadership Honoree 1983

== See also ==
- Hawaii Arts Alliance – Alfred Preis Award
- Honpa Hongwanji Mission of Hawaii – Living Treasures of Hawaii
- YWCA Building (Honolulu, Hawaii)
