= Mitsuo =

- Gender: Male

Origin
- Origin: Japanese
- Meaning: Different meanings depending on the kanji used

Mitsuo (written: 光男, 光央, 光雄, 光夫, 満男, 満夫, 三男, 三雄, 美津雄, 己津央 or みつお in hiragana) is a masculine Japanese given name. Notable people with the name include:

- Mitsuo Aoki (1914–2010), American theologian
- Mitsuo Fuchida (淵田 美津雄; 1902–1976), Japanese naval aviator
- Mitsuo Fujikura, Japanese mixed martial artist
- Mitsuo Fukuda (福田 己津央; born 1960), Japanese anime director
- Mitsuo Harada (born 1964), Japanese golfer
- Mitsuo Hashimoto (director) (橋本 みつお), Japanese anime director
- Mitsuo Hashimoto (manga artist) (はしもと みつお; born 1955), Japanese manga artist
- Mitsuo Horigome (堀米 光男; born 1974), Japanese cross-country skier
- Mitsuo Horiuchi (堀内 光雄; born 1930), Japanese politician
- Mitsuo Ikeda (池田 三男; 1935–2002), Japanese sport wrestler
- Mitsuo Iso (磯 光雄; born 1966), Japanese animator and anime director
- Mitsuo Itoh (伊藤 光夫; born 1937), Japanese motorcycle racer
- Mitsuo Iwata (岩田 光央; born 1967), Japanese voice actor
- Mitsuo Kagawa (賀川 光夫; 1923–2001), Japanese archaeologist and academic
- Mitsuo Kamata (鎌田 光夫; born 1937), Japanese footballer and manager
- Mitsuo Kato (加藤 光雄; born 1953), Japanese footballer
- Mitsuo Matayoshi (又吉 光雄; born 1944), Japanese activist
- Mitsuo Mitani (三谷 光男; born 1959), Japanese politician
- Mitsuo Momota (百田 光雄; born 1948), Japanese professional wrestler
- Mitsuo Nakamura (中村 光夫; 1911–1988), pen-name of Koba Ichiro, Japanese writer
- Mitsuo Nakanishi (中西 光雄; born 1948), Japanese sprint canoeist
- Mitsuo Ogasawara (小笠原 満男; born 1979), Japanese footballer
- Mitsuo Sanami (佐波 光男; born 1937), Japanese sport shooter
- Mitsuo Senda (千田 光男; 1940–2023), Japanese voice actor
- Mitsuo Shindō (信藤 三雄; born 1948), Japanese art, film and music director
- Taketani Mitsuo (武谷 三男; 1911–2000), Japanese physicist
- Mitsuo Tatsukawa (達川 光男; born 1955), Japanese baseball player
- Mitsuo Terada (寺田 光男; born 1968), Tsunku (ja:つんく♂)'s real name, a prolific Japanese record producer, songwriter, and vocalist
- Mitsuo Tsukahara (塚原 光男; born 1947), Japanese artistic gymnast
- Mitsuo Watanabe (渡辺 三男; born 1953), Japanese footballer
- Mitsuo Yamada (山田 満夫; born 1994), Japanese footballer
- Mitsuo Yamane (山根 三雄; born 1924), Japanese sport shooter
- Mitsuo Yanagimachi (柳町 光男; born 1945), Japanese screenwriter and film director
- Mitsuo Yoshikawa (吉川 光夫; born 1988), Japanese baseball player
