= Sanami =

Sanami may refer to:

- Sanami Matoh, (born 1969), Japanese manga artist
- Mitsuo Sanami (born 1937), Japanese sport shooter

== See also ==
- Sanamid, alternative name of Sulfanilamide
- Sanamidol, alternative name of Omeprazole
