= Lili'uokalani Symphony =

Studio album by Lalo Schifrin
- Released: January 1, 1995
- Recorded: 1994
- Genre: 20th-century classical music
- Length: 57:07
- Labels: Urtext Digital Classics; NX.JBCC006
- Producers: Lalo Schifrin; Neil Hannahs, Executive producer

Lalo Schifrin chronology
Firebird: Jazz Meets the Symphony No. 3 (1995)	Lili'uokalani Symphony (1995)	Music from Mission: Impossible (1996)

The Lili'uokalani Symphony is Argentine-American composer Lalo Schifrin's first symphony. Commissioned by her family, it was dedicated to the memory of Queen Liliʻuokalanii, the last Queen of the Kingdom of Hawaii who was also an ecologist and composer who sacrificed her crown in order to save her people.

The symphony premiered in Hawaii by an ad hoc group of musicians from the Hawaii Symphony Orchestra named "The Lili'uokalani Symphony Orchestra" in 1993. The work was then recorded by the Wiener Symphoniker (Vienna Symphony Orchestra) with the Kamehameha Elementary School Children's Chorus and the Hawaii Youth Opera Chorus under the direction of the composer, assisted by choral conductors Nola Nahulu and Lynell Bright. The album was released on CD on the Urtext Digital Classics label on January 1, 1995 and is also available as a digital download.

== Track listing ==
Symphony #1 (Lili'uokalani) by Lalo Schifrin

1. First movement (17:21)
2. Second movement (13:35)
3. Third movement (7:45)
4. Fourth movement (18:26)

== Personnel ==
Source =

- Vienna Symphony Orchestra
- Hawaii Youth Opera Chorus
- Kamehameha Elementary School Children's Chorus
- Lalo Schifrin – Composer, conductor, producer, liner notes
- Nola Nahulu – Conductor, Hawaii Youth Opera Chorus
- Lynell Bright – Conductor, Kamehameha Elementary School Children's Chorus
- Neil Hannahs – Executive producer
- Jiri Pospichal, Gustav Soral & Don C. Tyler – Recording engineers
- John Richards – Mixing engineer
