= Annie Kanahele =

American teacher, writer, and Hawaiiana expert

- Born: c. 1896; Keauhou, Republic of Hawaii
- Died: August 12, 1989 (aged 92–93)
- Occupations: Teacher, writer, Hawaiiana expert
- Spouse: Francis H. Kanahele

Annie L. A. Kanahele (1896/97–1989) was an American teacher, writer, and Hawaiiana expert. She worked in Hawaii's public school system for 42 years as a teacher and principal, translated papers from Hawaiian to English for Bishop Museum, and was made a Living Treasure of Hawai'i by the Honpa Hongwanji Mission of Hawaii.

== Life ==
Kanahele was born in Keauhou, Hawaii. She worked as a teacher and principal in Hawaii public schools for 42 years. She was married to Francis H. Kanahele, a civil engineer.

Kanahele and Flora Kaai Hayes volunteered together beginning around 1963 as translators for Bishop Museum, where they translated government papers and letters between aliʻi from Hawaiian to English. Hayes read the papers aloud in Hawaiian, and Kanahele wrote them down in English.

Kanahele was a Christian, and was involved in Kaumakapili Church for 65 years. She served as president of the United Church of Christ's Women's Board of Missions of the Pacific in 1971, and was the first Hawaiian to do so. She published an autobiography titled Annie: Life of a Hawaiian in 1976, and the proceeds went to Kaumakapili and Mokuaikaua churches. Around 1979, she was involved in an effort to reprint the Bible in Hawaiian, and argued that diacritics should not be added to the reprint because the original translation was an example of the Hawaiian language as it was written at the time of translation.

She died on August 12, 1989, in her home; she was 92 years old.

== Awards ==
Kanahele was made Hawaii's Mother of the Year and National Merit Mother by the American Mothers' Association in 1971, received the David Malo Award in 1981, and was named a Living Treasure of Hawaii by the Honpa Hongwanji Mission of Hawaii in 1982.
