= Agnes Conrad =

Agnes Conrad may refer to:

- Agnes C. Conrad, American archivist and historian
- Agnes Conrad (politician), German politician
