= Liliʻuokalani (disambiguation) =

Liliʻuokalani (1838–1917), was the only queen-regnant and the last sovereign of the Kingdom of Hawai'i.

(Queen) Liliuokalani, Lili'uokalani, Liliʻuokalani, may also refer to:

== Queen Liliuokalani ==
- Queen Liliuokalani Freeway, O'ahu, Hawaii, USA; Interstate H-1
- N73711 (named: Queen Liliuokalani), a Boeing 737 airliner that suffered a catastrophic decompression and loss of ceiling during flight on 28 April 1988, while operating as Aloha Airlines Flight 243

== Liliuokalani ==
- Liliʻuokalani Park and Gardens, Hilo, Big Island, Hawaii, USA; a park and Japanese garden
- Liliʻuokalani Botanical Garden, Honolulu, Oahu, Hawaii, USA
- Liliuokalani Protestant Church, Haleiwa, Oahu, Hawaii, USA
- Lili'uokalani Symphony, a symphony, a 1995 musical composition, also released as an album, by Lalo Schifrin

== See also ==
- Liliʻuokalani Trust
- Lydia Liliʻuokalani Kawānanakoa (1905–1969), a member of the House of Kawānanakoa
