= Yukio Ozaki (artist) =

Japanese-born American ceramicist (born 1948)

- 尾崎 幸雄
- Born: 1948 (age 76–77); Tokyo, Japan
- Education: Gakushuin University, University of Hawaiʻi at Mānoa (MFA)
- Employer: Chaminade University of Honolulu
- Awards: Living Treasures of Hawai'i (1994)

Yukio Ozaki (Japanese: 尾崎 幸雄, lit. 'Ozaki Yukio'; born 1948) is a Japanese-born American ceramicist, wood sculptor, and teacher. He taught at Chaminade University of Honolulu for many years. Ozaki has created many commissioned works for the Hawaiʻi State Foundation on Culture and the Arts. He was named one of the Living Treasures of Hawai'i in 1994 by the Honpa Hongwanji Mission of Hawaii; and was named a Carnegie Foundation as "Professor of the Year" in 1998.

Yukio Ozaki was born in 1948, in Tokyo. He received a degree from Gakushuin University in Tokyo; and a MFA degree in 1977 from the University of Hawaiʻi at Mānoa.
