= Puakea Nogelmeier =

American composer of Hawaiian music and chant

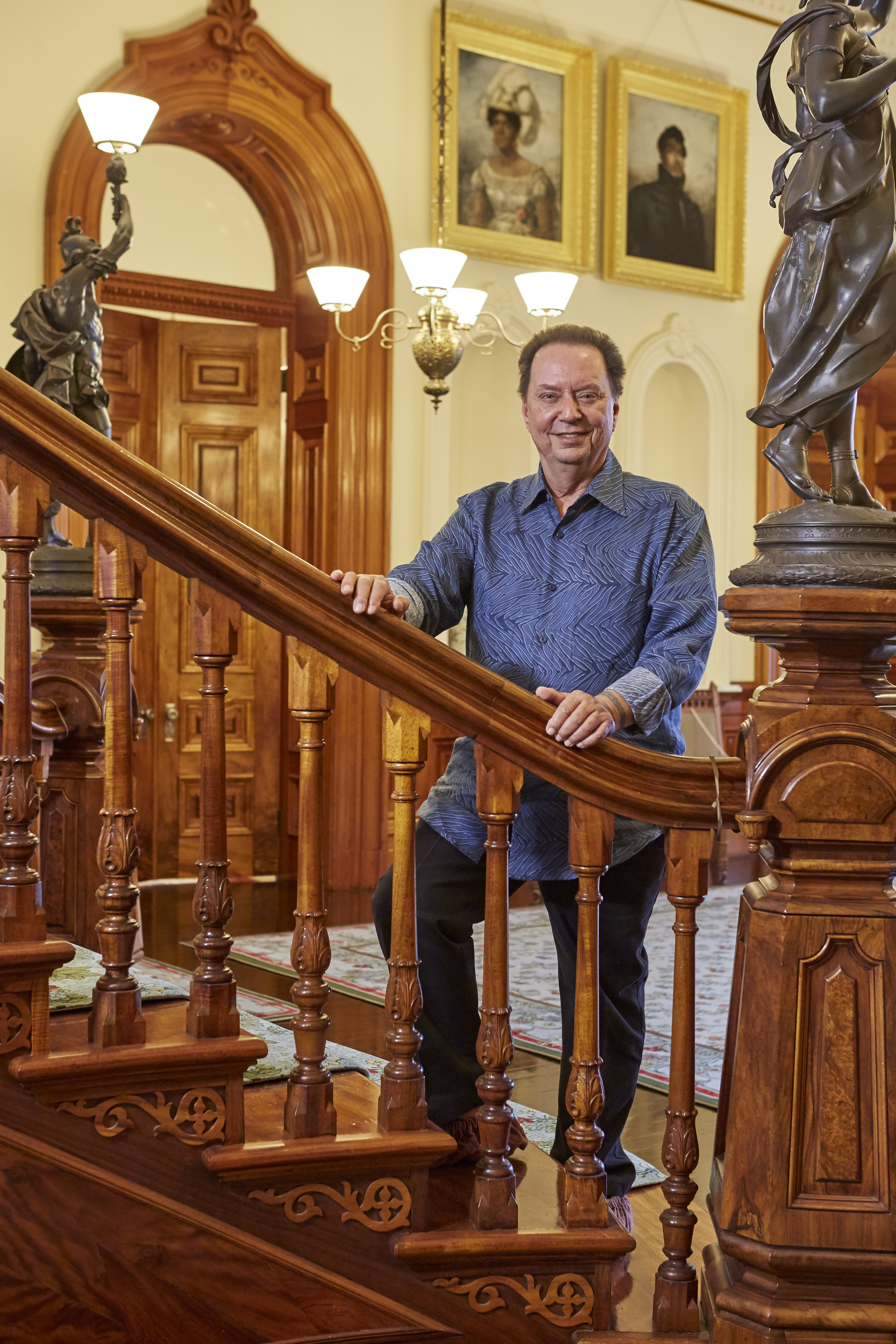
- Nogelmeier at ʻIolani Palace, 2018
- Born: Marvin Nogelmeier c. 1953 (age 72–73); San Francisco, California
- Occupations: Professor, Linguist, Composer, Kumu Hula
- Awards: Hawaiian Music Hall of Fame, Nā Hōkū Hanohano Award

Academic background
- Education: Anthropology (PhD), Pacific Island Studies (MA), Hawaiian Language and Anthropology (BA)
- Alma mater: University of Hawaiʻi
- Thesis: Mai Pa'a I Ka Leo: Historical voice in Hawaiian primary materials, looking forward and listening back (2003)

Academic work
- Discipline: Hawaiian Language
- Institutions: University of Hawaiʻi
- Notable works: The Epic Tale of Hiʻiakaikapoliopele

Puakea Nogelmeier (born 1953) is a kumu hula, linguist, scholar, researcher, writer and American composer of Hawaiian music and chant who is Professor Emeritus of Hawaiian Language at the University of Hawaiʻi at Mānoa and Executive Director of Awaiaulu. Nogelmeier was Professor at the Kawaihuelani Center for Hawaiian Language at the University of Hawaiʻi at Mānoa. His translation of The Epic Tale of Hiʻiakaikapoliopele won the 2008 Samuel M. Kamakau Award for books of the year.

Nogelmeier was born Marvin Nogelmeier. He was given the Hawaiian name, Puakea, by kumu hula Maʻiki Aiu Lake. "Puakea" translates to "fair child." Nogelmeier was trained in hula by Mililani Allen, learned Hawaiian chant from Edith Kanakaʻole and Edith Kawelohea McKinzie. He learned much of the Hawaiian language and culture from Theodore Kelsey, Sarah Nākoa, and Kamuela Kumukahi.

In 1999, Honolulu's public bus transportation service, TheBus, hired Nogelmeier to rerecord the voice announcements featured on the bus. Nearly 6,000 individual phrases and place names were recorded for the program. In the process, Nogelmeier researched each Hawaiian place name to ensure the most accurate pronunciation. The recordings have helped to standardize how people pronounce these names.

== Life ==
In 1984, Nogelmeier began teaching Hawaiian language at the University of Hawaiʻi at Mānoa. He retired in 2018 after teaching for 35 years.

Nogelmeier is openly gay.

== Academic achievements, awards, and honors ==
- Samuel M. Kamakau Award - Book of the Year (2008)
- Hawaiian Music Hall of Fame (2014)

=== Nā Hōkū Hanohano Awards ===
Over the years, Nogelmeier has been nominated for more than two dozen Nā Hōkū Hanohano Awards for a number of categories. He was awarded the Lifetime Achievement Award in 2021 at the 43rd Nā Hōkū Hanohano Awards.

Year	Album/Artist	Category	Result	Ref
2020	Ka Lei Moana (Kūpaoa)	Liner Notes	Won	
2020	Ka Lei Moana (Kūpaoa)	Song of the Year	Nominated	
2017	Hoʻokele (Kūpaoa)	Liner Notes	Nominated	
2017	Hoʻokele (Kūpaoa)	Haku Mele	Nominated	
2014	Bumbye (Kūpaoa)	Haku Mele	Won	
2011	English Rose (Kūpaoa)	Liner Notes	Won	
2009	Kamalei: Collection Two (Kealiʻi Reichel)	Liner Notes	Won	
2007	Maluhia (Kealiʻi Reichel)	Liner Notes	Won	
2004	Keʻalaokamaile (Kealiʻi Reichel)	Song of the Year	Won	
2004	Keʻalaokamaile (Kealiʻi Reichel)	Liner Notes	Won	
2000	Melelana (Kealiʻi Reichel)	Liner Notes	Won	

== Selected compositions ==
Hawaiian

- Ka Hula Papa Holoi (Performed by Nāpua Greig)
- Ka Nohona Pili Kai (Co-written and Performed by Kealiʻi Reichel)
- Lei Haliʻa (Performed by Kealiʻi Reichel)
- Nematoda (Performed by Kealiʻi Reichel)
- Toad Song (Performed by Kealiʻi Reichel)
- Pili O Ke Ao (Performed by Kūpaoa)

Hawaiian-English

- Bumbye (Performed by Kūpaoa)

== Selected bibliography ==
Language and translations

- The Epic Tale of Hiʻiakaikapoliopele
- I Ulu I Ke Kumu : The Hawai'inuiākea Monograph
- Ke Kumu Aupuni : The Foundation of Hawaiian Nationhood – compilation of articles by Samuel Kamakau in newspaper Ka Nupepa Kuokoa from October 1866 to February 1868

Hawaiian Culture

- Ke Aupuni Mōʻī Edited by Puakea Nogelmeier
- Keaomelemele; "He Moʻolelo Kaʻao No Keaomelemele"
