= Emma DeFries =

American Hawaiian mystic, musician, activist (1925–1980)

- Born: Emma Rosalind Hoopii Kanoa DeFries; December 8, 1925; Honolulu, Territory of Hawaii (now Hawaii, United States)
- Died: December 8, 1980 (aged 55); Kaʻaʻawa, Hawaii, U.S.
- Burial place: Valley of the Temples Memorial Park
- Occupations: Mystic, musician, cultural educator, activist

Emma Rosalind Hoopii Kanoa DeFries (December 8, 1925 – December 8, 1980) was an American and Hawaiian mystic, musician, cultural educator, and activist.

== Life and career ==
Emma Rosalind Hoopii Kanoa DeFries was born on December 8, 1925, in Honolulu, Territory of Hawaii (now Hawaii, United States). Her parents were Rebecca Kaleokoi Kua and John Alexander Liholiho De Fries Sr., she was of Native Hawaiian ancestry. Her paternal grandmother was Emma Alexandria Kilioulani Kanoa De Fries (1855–1923), and her great grandfather was Hawaiian religious leader Hewahewa.

DeFries was a practitioner of Hoʻomana Hawai'i (Hawaiian religion). She was the spiritual leader of the late-1970s operation Protect Kahoʻolawe ʻOhana (PKO), an activist campaign against the United States bombing and military exercises in Hawaii.

DeFries was named as one of the Living Treasures of Hawaii in 1979 by the Buddhist temple Honpa Hongwanji Mission of Hawaii.
