= Terry Shintani =

American physician, nutritionist and author

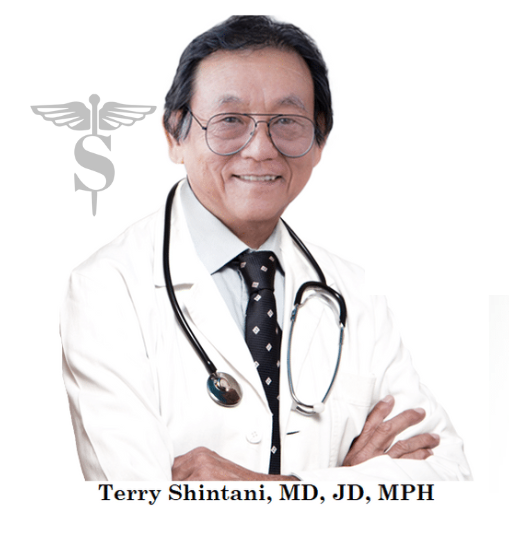
- Born: 1951 (age 74–75); Hawaii
- Occupation: Physician

Terry Shintani (born 1951) is an American physician, nutritionist and author from Hawaii who advocates for whole food plant-based nutrition. Shintani is best known for his books, which include, Eat More, Weigh Less Diet (1993), The Hawaii Diet (2000), The Good Carbohydrate Revolution (2003) and The Peace Diet (2014). He promotes a high-carbohydrate vegan diet influenced by the cuisine of Hawaii.

In 2006, he became one of the Living Treasures of Hawaii, for his contributions to the community.

== Career ==
In 1997, he attempted to improve the health of the citizens of the State of Hawaii by involving Hawaii's governor Ben Cayetano, his cabinet members and a number of prominent community members in promoting his diet to the general public. His book The Hawaii Diet (2000) is based on this work. In 2000, he created Zippy's "Shintani Cuisine" Program which has served over 900,000 low-fat, no-cholesterol meals to members of the public, and of which all royalties are used to promote health in Hawaii. Shintani was influenced by the macrobiotic diet. His The Good Carbohydrate Revolution (2003) has been described as a high-carbohydrate low-fat fad diet.

In 2006, for his lifelong service to the Hawaii community, he was formally designated a Living Treasure of Hawaii. In 2006, the Honolulu Advertiser described Dr. Shintani's work as an important part of the island's 150-year history.

As of 2015, he is president and founding president of the Hawaii Health Foundation, and is the co-founder of the clinic of the Department of Complementary and Integrative Medicine, of which he holds the position of Professor and Associate Chair, at the University of Hawaii School of Medicine. He also holds the following positions; CEO of the International Holistic Therapy Association, Prior of the Priory of Hawaii of the Knights of the Orthodox Order of St. John Russian Grand Priory, Chair of the Advisory Board of the Gandhi International Institute of Peace, President of the Board of the Hawaii Center for Attitudinal Healing, member of the Council of Elders of Native Hawaiian Healers, and is a member of the Advisory Board of the American College of Lifestyle Medicine.

== Honors ==
- "Living Treasure of Hawaii," 2006. He was formally designated a "Living Treasure of Hawaii" for his many contributions to the community in various areas including the fields of medicine, law, traditional healing arts, and cultural preservation.
- "Distinguished Alumnus Award," 1999. Awarded by the University of Hawai‘i Alumni Association.
