= Puanani Van Dorpe =

Hawaiian kapa maker

- Born: 1933; Honolulu
- Died: October 21, 2014; Kailua-Kona
- Occupation: Textile artist

Greta Mae "Puanani" Kanemura Van Dorpe (née Greta Mae Kanemura; 1933–2014) was an American artist and master of kapa, the traditional Hawaiian art of making cloth from bark fibers. Van Dorpe spent more than forty years researching the forgotten craft of making kapa, investigating the tools and materials used by ancient Hawaiians and experimenting to replicate the cloth. She has been credited as one of the women responsible for reviving the art of kapa in the 1970s.

== Early life ==
Greta Mae Kanemura was born in Honolulu, Hawaii, in 1933. Her ethnic background was one-eighth native Hawaiian.

As a young adult, Van Dorpe worked as a hula dancer in Waikiki. In the early 1970s, her husband Robert was recruited to work at a cultural center in Fiji. Van Dorpe played golf every day while her husband worked on the center and was the first Hawaiian to play in the Fiji Open. She and her daughter Kapuailohia were invited to visit the Fijian island Vatulele; Van Dorpe was transfixed by the sight of the women of the island creating masi cloth using traditional methods, infusing their work with a deep sense of spirituality. After her ten days on Vatulele, she came away with an intense desire to learn more.

== Artwork and scholarship ==
After relocating from Fiji back to Hawaii, Van Dorpe dedicated herself to learning more about the creation of kapa. She offered to inventory the Bishop Museum's collection of Hawaiian bark cloth made before contact with Western explorers. Although there were many complimentary references to kapa in written documentation from outsiders to the culture, they were of little practical use. She found there were no clear recipes or instructions, so she collaborated with native Hawaiian speakers and scholars to examine legends and chants that had survived colonization for clues to how kapa had been made.

Van Dorpe struggled to find wauke (paper mulberry), the plants from which most kapa was traditionally made. She used cuttings from a patch of wauke she recovered from a cliffside in the ʻĪao Valley to create a four-and-a-half-acre wauke orchard. Van Dorpe worked with botanists and gardeners to source taro mud, ʻukiʻuki (Dianella sandwicensis), ʻākala (Rubus hawaiensis), and other plants and materials used to dye kapa. She used the fruit of the hala (Pandanus tectorius) as a dye brush. She worked with a forensic scientist to analyze materials used to dye cloth as well as to fix dye into cloth. Van Dorpe also worked with LeVan Sequiera, a Maui woodworker and canoe builder, to research and craft hōhoa, the wooden beaters used for softening and spreading the fiber of the bark. She experimented with tools and techniques, softening wauke in seawater and scraping, pounding, and bleaching to refine the cloth. Van Dorpe worked up to ten hours a day kneeling beside a stone anvil beating the fermented pulp into a seamless felt. To ensure the knowledge was preserved, she kept meticulous records.

In the late 1980s, construction of an oceanside resort in Honokahua resulted in the excavation of more than 900 ancestral native Hawaiian burials. After protests, the bodies were reinterred, with Van Dorpe leading fourteen women for four months to make over 1,000 pieces of kapa to wrap each set of bones for a respectful reburial. She was also responsible for making kapa for the reinterment of one of the relics of Father Damien in Molokaʻi.

She had a solo exhibit in 1999 at the East-West Center Gallery of the University of Hawaiʻi at Mānoa which was dedicated to demonstrating the methods Van Dorpe recovered for making kapa. Her work is exhibited at the King Kamehameha Golf Course Clubhouse in Waikapu, where eleven panels of kapa honor historic Maui chiefs. Van Dorpe's artwork "Kihei Kapa," created in 2000 to honor the ancient Hawaiian god of agriculture Lono, is located within the Kamakakūokalani Center for Hawaiian Studies at the University of Hawaiʻi at Mānoa.

Van Dorpe lectured at Harvard University and within the Kamehameha Schools system. Her daughter, Kapuailohia Van Dorpe, apprenticed with her mother and continues her work in kapa making.

== Death and legacy ==
Van Dorpe died in 2014 in Kailua-Kona. Remembrances credited her with reviving kapa in Hawaii in the 1970s, inspiring generations of new kapa makers.

In 1991, she was named one of the Living Treasures of Hawaii by the Honpa Hongwanji Mission of Hawaii, recognizing her efforts in preserving Hawaii's cultural and artistic heritage.

A larger than life-size statue located within the Hilton Hawaiian Village hotel was created in 2006 featuring Van Dorpe as the centerpiece. The sculpture depicts Van Dorpe making kapa, being watched over by the patron goddesses of kapa makers, Lauhuki and La'ahana.

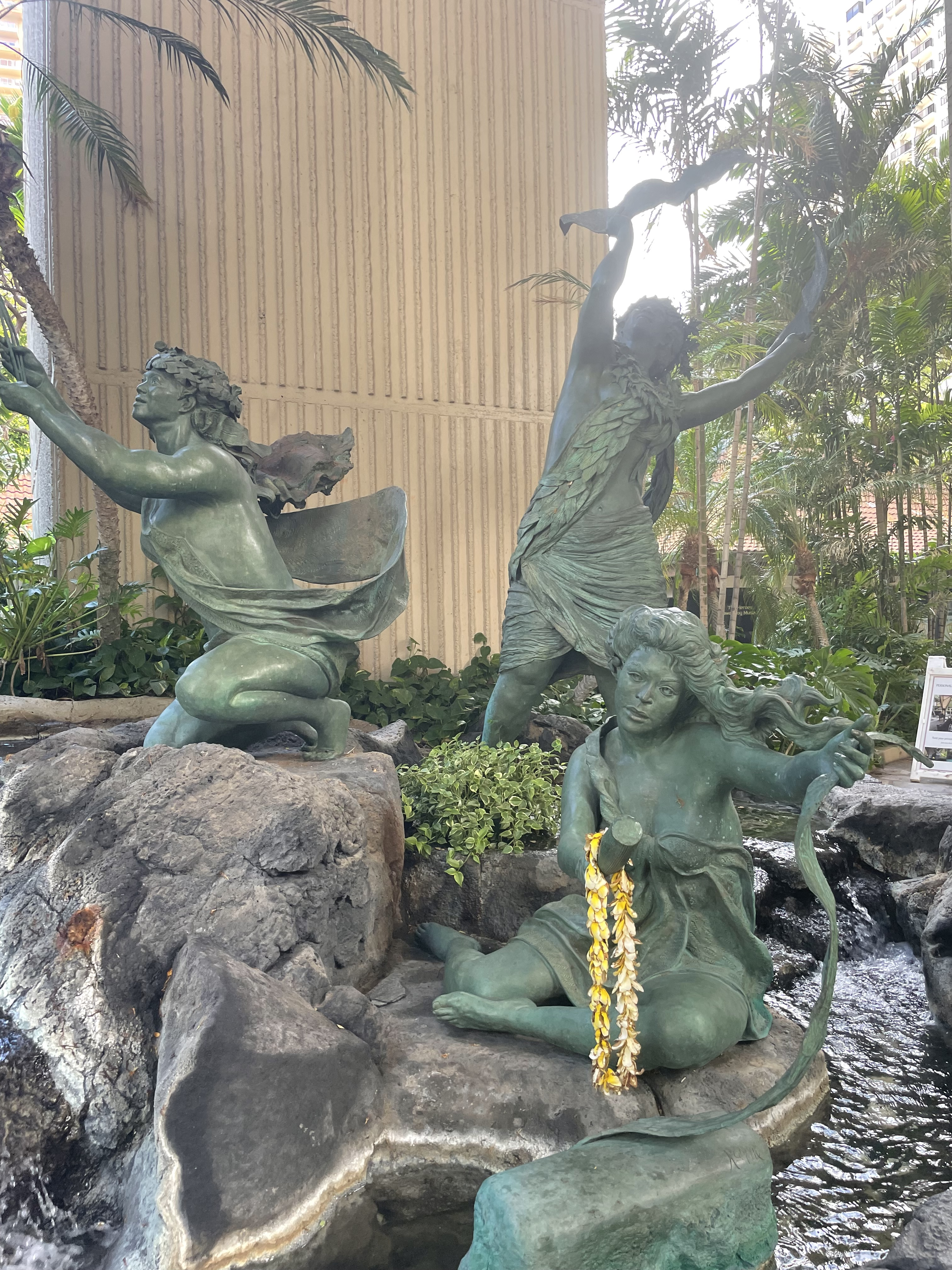
"The Tapa Makers" sculpture by KaMille, located in the Hilton Hawaiian Village in Honolulu. Van Dorpe is the seated figure on the right.
