= David Kanuha =

David Kanuha ʻAinoa
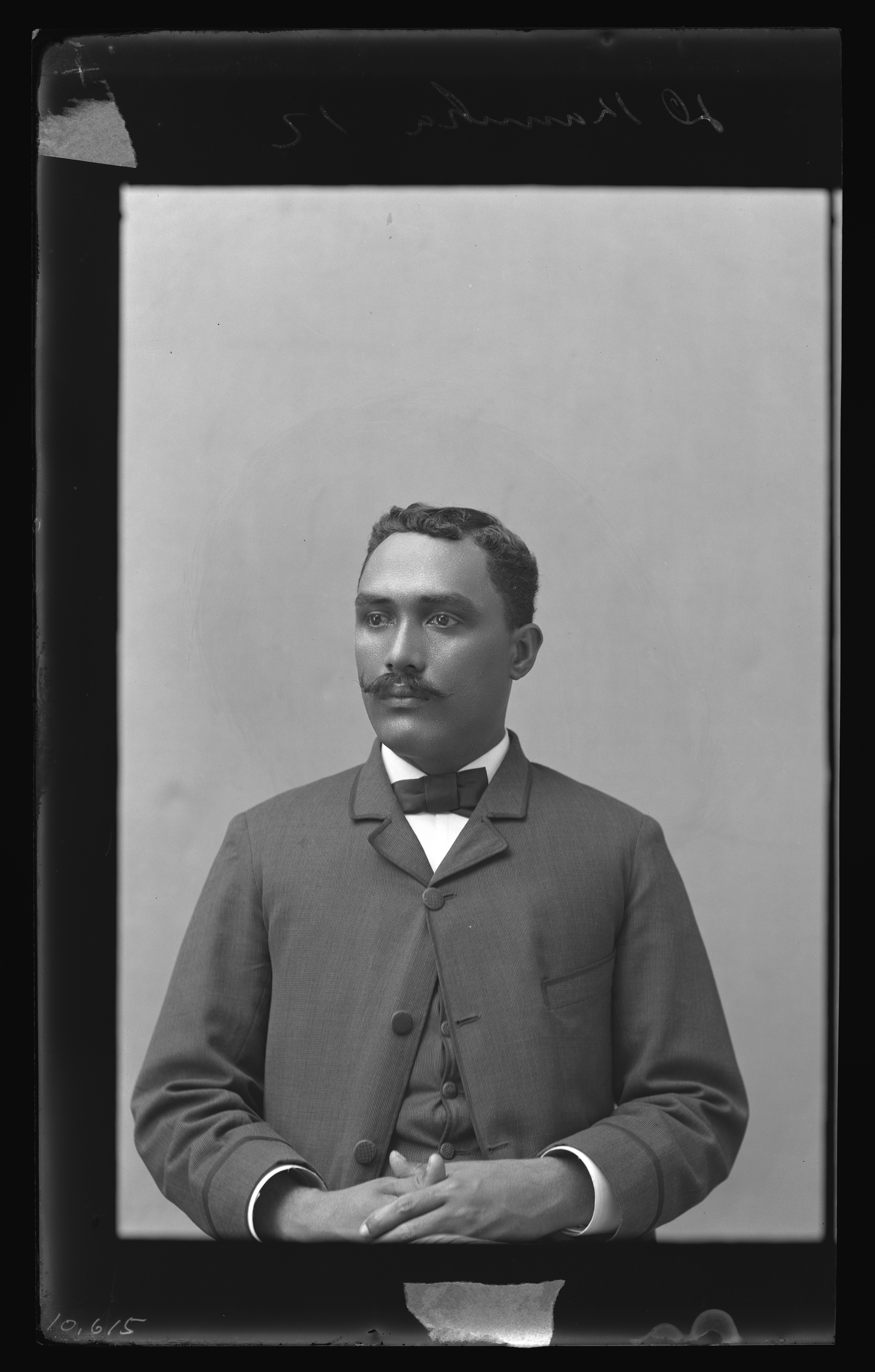

Personal details
- Born: July 4, 1861 Lahaina, Kingdom of Hawaii
- Died: November 12, 1938 (aged 77) Honolulu, Territory of Hawaii

David Kanuha, also known as David Kanuha Ainoa (July 4, 1861 - November 12, 1938) was the first Native Hawaiian teacher at Kamehameha Schools in Kalihi, Honolulu, Hawaii starting on January 27, 1893, only days after the overthrow of the Kingdom of Hawaii. He taught tailoring at school and was one of the only school staff to participate in the 1895 Wilcox rebellion in resisting the Republican forces after the kingdom's overthrow. Arrested and convicted of treason for his beliefs, Kanuha was elected to the new territorial legislature.

He was married to Esther Staine. The couple had two children, a daughter named Gladys Kamakakuokalani Brandt and a son named David K. Ainoa. An infant son named Alfred Staine Kanuha died in 1899.
