= Hawaii Youth Opera Chorus =

The Hawaiʻi Youth Opera Chorus (HYOC) is Hawaiʻi's premier children's choir. It is currently under the direction of Nola A. Nāhulu as well as several assistant directors, accompanists, and various other instructors. It is currently housed at the University of Hawaiʻi (Mānoa) music department, although previously it was housed at Kawaiahaʻo Church, located in Downtown Honolulu on the Hawaiian Island of Oʻahu.

In addition to performances with the opera, HYOC has developed its own diverse repertoire which ranges from classical, spiritual, secular, and Hawaiian music. HYOC has also branched out to include other endeavours, such as hula and piano classes. It has also recently introduced a special rehearsal for the male voices of the organization, in an attempt to draw more interest towards boys.

== History ==
Originally the Honolulu Children's Opera Chorus (HCOC), HYOC was founded in 1961 to provide children for the Hawaiʻi Opera Theatre (HOT)'s production of Giacomo Puccini's La Bohème. So many children appeared for the audition that it was soon realised that Hawaiʻi was in great need of a children's chorus. Since then, HYOC has grown tremendously. It now contains singers from Kindergarten to 12th grade in eight ensembles. To this day, HYOC shares a strong connection with HOT, and the operas that require children use singers from HYOC. The 2006 season operas Il Trittico (Suor Angelica) and Tosca featured children from HYOC's Cantilena and Scelto ensembles. Past productions include 2005's Turandot, 2003's La Bohème, 2002's Carmen, and 2001's Pagliacci/Cavalleria Rusticana.

HYOC started out as a single ensemble, but as its attendance grew it continued to add additional choirs. Cantilena, for example, was created when the Coro ensemble became too large. Gioventù Musicale was created when the age range of the organisation expanded to include youth rather than just children.

As HYOC has grown, it has attracted more and more singers from all over Oʻahu. It has members from most of Hawaiʻi's public and private schools as well as homeschooled members.

== Performances ==
In addition to the operas, HYOC performs at a variety of venues either alone or with other groups. On 22 November 2006, together with the Honolulu Symphony and the Symphony Chorus, HYOC presented John Rutter's Mass of the Children, featuring HYOC as the prominent children's chorus.

HYOC also hosts several music festivals. Most notably, HYOC holds the annual Pacific Rim Children's Chorus Festival in July, bringing singers from all over the United States and elsewhere to Hawaii to study choral music of the Pacific Rim with clinician Henry Leck.

== Ensembles ==
HYOC has eight separate choirs, or ensembles. The attendance of each ensemble is primarily based on age of the student, although there is some overlap based on each student's achievement and length of time in the organization. All but one have Italian names; Nā Leo Kūhoʻokahi is the only ensemble with a Hawaiian name.
