= Emma Farden Sharpe =

Hawaiian hula teacher and musician

- Born: September 16, 1904; Pu‘ukōli‘i, Lahaina
- Died: 1991
- Family: Irmgard Farden Aluli

Emma Kapiʻolani Farden Sharpe (1904 – 1991) was a Hawaiian hula performer and kumu hula (hula teacher). Sharpe was a musician who released several singles with her sisters as well as leading her own musical troupe; she was also a composer and a producer of professional Hawaiian shows. In 1984 she was recognized as part of the Living Treasures of Hawaiʻi program.

== Early life and family ==
Emma Kapiʻolani Farden was born in Pu‘ukōli‘i, Lahaina on September 16, 1904. She was part of a large family with 13 children born to mother Annie Kahalepouli Bastel Shaw Farden, of Hawaiian-Hungarian heritage, and Charles Kekua Farden, of Hawaiian-French German heritage. The family's ancestral home was named Puamana and was located on Lahaina's Front Street. Each of the family members were musicians, with Emma and her younger sister Irmgard Farden Aluli the most well known. Growing up, the children sang harmony as they worked in nearby sugarcane fields.

Sharpe was a schoolteacher at King Kamehameha III Elementary School for forty years, beginning in 1923. She had three children with her husband, David Taylor Sharpe.

== Music and dance ==
Five members of the family released singles under the name The Farden Sisters: Emma, Irmgard, Edna, Maude, and Diane. The Farden family as a whole won the Hawaiʻi Aloha Award from the Hawaiian Music Foundation in 1977.

Sharpe's best known work, Lahaina's Fabulous Emma Sharpe, was published in 1960. The album featured members of her troupe, including her daughter Kaloulukea Imamura. In the 1960s and the 1970s, Sharpe performed every Sunday evening in the Discovery Room at the Maui Surf Hotel (later the Sheraton-Maui). The dancers of Sharpe's Puamana troupe, named for the Farden family house, danced there and at other hotels nightly through the 1980s.

She composed songs such as "Hula O Pakipika" and "Nani ʻUlupalakua." Sharpe also established the Hawaiian Cultural Festival (Na Mele O Maui).

Sharpe learned traditional hula from several teachers. At age fifteen she began studying with Kauhai Likua, a dancer for the royal court of King Kamehameha IV. She would pass Likua's style, flowery and gracefully, on to her students. Sharpe would later study hula with Joseph Ilalaʻole and scholar Mary Kawena Pukui. Sharpe taught hula to anyone who wanted to learn, instructing thousands of visitors to Hawaii as well as kumu hula such as Nina Maxwell and Kathy Holoʻaumoku Ralar.

== Death and legacy ==
Sharpe was recognized by the Honpa Hongwanji Mission of Hawaii as part of the Living Treasures of Hawaiʻi program in 1984. She died in 1991. The Maui News described her as "the leader of Maui's cultural scene for more than half the century."

She started a hula festival as part of the Na Mele O Maui; it phased out in the 1990s but was restarted in 2014 with a new name honoring Sharpe. The annual Emma Farden Sharpe Hula Festival is an invitational event in Maui featuring performances, cultural workshops, historical exhibits, and artisan crafts.
