= Momi Cazimero =

American graphic designer (born 1933)

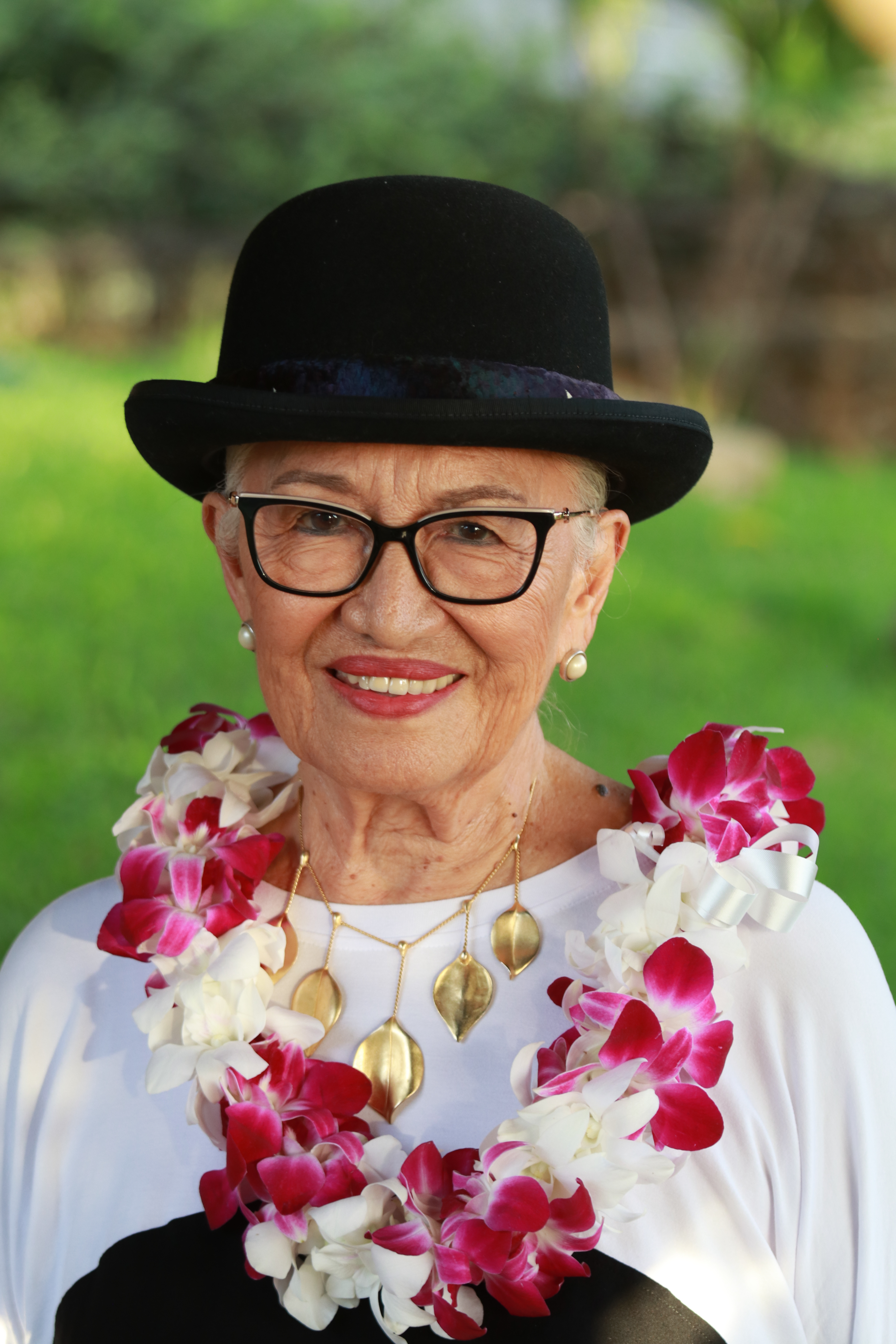
- Born: Momi Waihe'e; 1933
- Education: University of Hawaiʻi at Mānoa
- Occupation: Graphic designer
- Awards: Pacific Business News Gladys Kamakakuokalani Ainoa Brandt Kupuna Award

Momi Cazimero (née Momi Waihe'e) is an American graphic designer and firm owner, who established the first woman-owned graphic design firm in Hawaii.

== Early life ==
Cazimero is of Hawaiian, Okinawan, and English descent. She spent her early years with her grandparents John and Annie Waihe'e in Pepe'ekeo on the island of Hawai'i. When Cazimero was 8 years old, her grandfather died, and she was sent to live with her parents in Hilo, Hawaii.

Cazimero suffered both physical and verbal abuse in her new home, causing her to flee at the age of 11. By age 12, she attended Kamehameha School in Honolulu on a work scholarship, and was inspired by her aunt and school teacher named Esther McClellan. She lived in the dorms during the school year, and with her aunt over the summer, avoiding visiting home due to the abuse she received.

== Career ==
Cazimero attended college at the University of Hawaiʻi at Mānoa, her primary focus being on teaching after she graduated. However, after meeting Professor Kenneth Kingery, she realized she wanted to go into graphic design instead of becoming a teacher and opted to instead earn a Bachelor of Fine Arts in advertising design. Her primary intent in her work was described as being focused on "elevating the images and icons of Hawaii and Hawaiians".

In 1972, Cazimero established the first female-owned graphic design firm in Hawaii, known as Graphic House. By 1989, her business had expanded to five different locations. There has been a wide range of clients for Graphic House, with academies and museums among them.

Led by Jane Okamoto Komeiji, and in collaboration with Tom Klobe, Cazimero helped create the 1995 exhibit "Okage Sama De: I am what I am because of you" at the Japanese Cultural Center of Hawai’i.

Cazimero has served on many different boards, commissions, and organizations, among them the State Judicial Selection Commission (as vice chair), the Bishop Museum Council (as president), and the Small Business Advisory Council (as chair). Additionally, she has served as vice chair on the University of Hawai'i Board of Regents.

In 2001, Cazimero, David J. De la Torre, Manulani Aluli Meyer, and the Honolulu Academy of Arts co-authored the book "Nā maka hou = New visions : contemporary native Hawaiian art."

On March 25, 2004, she was awarded the Pacific Business News Gladys Kamakakuokalani Ainoa Brandt Kupuna Award. She also served on the Hawai'i State Foundation on Culture and the Arts' 2004-2005 Legislative Committee and Hawai'i State Art Museum Committee.

Cazimero was the designer for David W Eyre's 2007 book Clare : the Honolulu years.

From October 25 to December 11, 2009, Cazimero's work was featured in an art exhibition at the University of Hawai‘i at Mānoa that highlighted alumni artists.

Momi Cazimero is the 2021 Aloha Festival’s Emeritus Board Member.

== Personal life ==
Cazimero took her last name "Cazimero" during her first marriage. Her current husband is Lester Nakasone. She has four children.

== Community service ==
- Hale Kipa Campaign Committee, Vice Chair
- American Judicature Society, Board of Directors
- State Foundation on Culture and the Arts Commissioner
- Queen's Health System, Trustee, 1989-2004
  - Queen's Medical Center, Trustee
  - Moloka'i General Hospital, Chair
  - Queen Emma Foundation, Trustee
- Hawai'i State Judiciary, Judicial Selection Commission, 1983-1989
- Aloha Festivals, Directors Emeritus
- Hawaii's Friends of Morocco
- University of Hawai'i, Association of Emeritus Regents

== Awards ==
- Gladys Kamakakuokalani 'Ainoa Brandt Kupuna Award, Pacific Business News, Honolulu (2004)
- University of Hawai'i at Mānoa Distinguished Alumni Award, University of Hawai'i, Honolulu.
