= Blossom Puanani Alama-Tom =

Hawaiian hulu teacher (b. 1930)

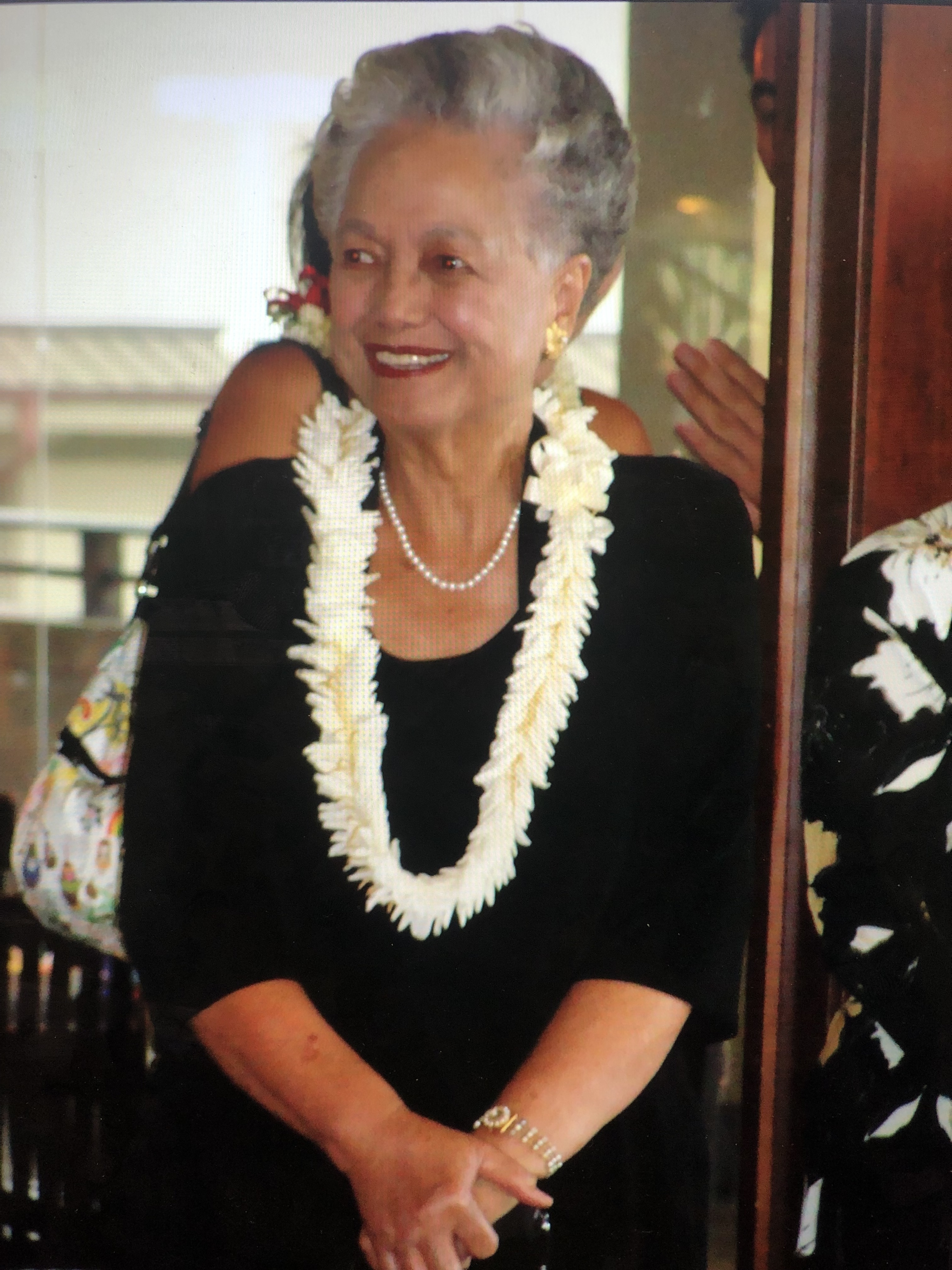
Blossom Puanani Alama-Tom

Blossom Puanani Alama-Tom (born July 31, 1930) is a Living Treasure of Hawaiʻi and the last surviving judge of the first Merrie Monarch Festival. Alama-Tom is also an entertainer, a kumu hula, a hula judge, and a musician. Since 1940, Alama-Tom has performed at the City and County of Honolulu Department of Parks and Recreation’s Nā Hula Festival.Her daughter Puanani Jung has created her own halau in Southern California.

== Early life ==
Alama-Tom was born and raised on the island of Oʻahu. She was raised by her mother, Agnus K. Wright and her father, Joseph K. Alama on Liliha Street. Alama-Tom is the youngest of 4 siblings. Her sister, Leilani Alama, was also interested in hula and would go on to become a known kumu hula in her own right.

Alama-Tom is an alumnus of President William McKinley High School. This was the extent of her formal Western education. Alama-Tom always knew that she would become a kumu hula and decided not to attend college.

== Career ==
Alama-Tom began teaching at an early age and by the age of 15 she was instructing vocalists such as Bill Aliʻiloa Lincoln and Genoa Keawe. In 1954 she opened her own studio, Alama Hula Studio, where she still currently teaches. Three years later, in 1957, Alama-Tom was featured on the cover of Honolulu Magazine, then called Paradise of the Pacific. This was not her first time being featured on a magazine cover, as a photograph of her was also on the April 1948 issue of Holiday magazine. She was also featured on the 1950s compilation album Lovely Hula Hands.

Alama-Tom was asked to perform as one of the judges for the first Merrie Monarch Hula Festival in 1963 and is one of the last surviving judges.
