= Francis Haar =

Hungarian photographer (1908-1997)

Haar, Francis
- Born: July 19, 1908; Csernátfalu, Austria-Hungary
- Died: December 22, 1997 (aged 89); Honolulu, Hawaii, United States
- Education: Moholy-Nagy University of Art and Design; Budapest
- Known for: Being a socio-photographer
- Spouse(s): Irene, Pápa. Married in 1934

Francis Haar born as Haár Ferenc (July 19, 1908 – December 22, 1997) was a Hungarian socio-photographer. He studied interior architecture at Hungarian Royal National School of Arts and Crafts between 1924 and 1927. His master was Gyula Kaesz.

== Life and career ==
He started working as an interior architect and poster designer in 1928, and taught himself photography. In 1930 he became acquainted with Munka-kör (Work Circle) led by socialist avant-garde poet and visual artist Lajos Kassák, who just returned from Vienna. Kassák pointed out that photography is more than painting and can access such a part of reality that cannot be accessed by painters. Kassák's motto was photography is the real child of our age, not the painting. That was a lifelong inspiration to Francis. He became an active and leading member of the Munka Kör, his partners in socio-photography were among others Sándor Gönci, Árpád Szélpál and Lajos Lengyel, who later became renowned graphic artist and book designer. The first socio photo exhibition ever in Hungary was held in 1932, which brought the first success to Francis. His first photo studio was opened in Budapest in 1934.

Some of his photos were exhibited at the Paris Exposition Internationale des Arts et Techniques dans la Vie Moderne in 1937, so Francis Haar decided to move to Paris where he established himself as a portrait photographer.

However, in 1939 he was invited by Hiroshi Kawazoe to Japan and the International Cultural Society of Japan (Kokusai Bunka Shinkokai) officially arranged his trip. With help of Japanese friends he opened and operated his photo studio in Tokyo between 1940 and 42. The Haar family was evacuated to Karuizawa in 1943 and they spent 3 years there. He became the photographer of Yank, the Army Weekly magazine of the U.S. occupation forces in Japan, and subsequently filmmaker with U.S. Public Health and Welfare Section (1946–48). Again his Tokyo photo studio was opened in 1946 and was in active business until 1956. His wife Irene opened the famous restaurant Irene's Hungaria in Ginza, downtown Tokyo, which was frequented by celebrities, intellectuals, army men and sportspeople from all over the world besides the Japanese.

Accepting a challenge he moved and worked as a photographer for the Container Corporation of America, Chicago from 1956 until 1959. He returned to Tokyo and operated his photo studio again for a year. 1960 brought a great decision and the Haars moved to Hawai'i and Francis started his photo studio there. He taught photography at the University of Hawai'i between 1964 and 1974. He became the production photographer for the Kennedy Theater, the University of Hawai'i Drama Department.

Francis Haar died at the age of 89 in Honolulu.

== Awards ==
- 1933, 1935 First Prize, National Photo Contest, Budapest
- 1959 First Prize, Metropolitan Improvement Photo Contest, Chicago
- Golden Eagle Award for Pineapple Country Hawai'i, C.I.N.E., Washington D.C.
- Photographic Award, Educational Perspectives Magazine, University of Hawai'i
- Gift Print Award, Arts Council of Hawai'i
- Living Treasure of Hawai'i, Honpa Hongwanji and the Hawai'i State Legislature
- Lifetime Achievement Award, Hungarian Photographic Society

== Books ==
- Way to Orient Arts Publishing Company, Tokyo, 1940
- Hungarian Picture Book Benrido Publishing Company, Kyoto, 1941
- Around Mount Fuji Benrido Publishing Company, Kyoto, 1942
- The Best of Old Japan Charles Tuttle Company, Tokyo, 1951
- Japanese Theatre in Highlights Charles Tuttle Company, Tokyo, 1951
- Mermaids of Japan Kanabeshobo Company, Tokyo, 1954
- Geisha of Pontocho by P.D. Perkins. Photographs by Francis Haar. Tokyo News Service, 1954
- The World of Dew : aspects of living Japan by D.J. Enright. Photographs by Francis Haar. Secker & Warburg, 1955
- Tokyo You Should See Charles Tuttle Company, Tokyo, 1960
- Foto Haár Ferenc Corvina Publishing Company, Budapest, 1969
- Legends of Hawai'i Victoria Publishers, Honolulu, 1972
- Artists of Hawai'i Vol. 1 University of Hawai'i Press, Honolulu, 1974
- Artists of Hawai'i Vol. 2 University of Hawai'i Press, Honolulu, 1977
- Iolani Luahine Topgallant Publishing, Honolulu, 1985, ISBN 978-0-914916-69-7
- A Zen Life: D. T. Suzuki Remembered (edited by Masao Abe) Paperback, Weatherhill, 1986, ISBN 978-0-8348-0213-1
- Francis Haar: A Lifetime of Images (edited by Tom Haar) Hardback, University of Hawaii Press, 2001, ISBN 9780824824495
- Haár Ferenc Magyarországi Képei: út a Munka-Körtől a Zen-Buddhizmusig (co-authors: Magdolna Kolta and Ferenc Király), Magyar Fotográfiai Múzeum, Kecskemét, 2004 ISBN 978-963-8383-43-3

== Exhibitions ==
- 1940, 1941 • Shirokiya Department Store Gallery, Tokyo
- 1949 • American Cultural Center, Tokyo
- 1952 • Haar Photo Studio, Kamakura, Japan
- 1957 • Chicago Public Library
- 1958 • University of Chicago
- 1962 • Honolulu Public Library
- 1963 • Art Department University of Hawai'i
- 1968 • Unitarian Church Gallery, Honolulu
- 1969 • Graphic Gallery, Honolulu Academy of Arts
- 1972 • Helikon Galéria, Budapest
- 1972 • Princess Kaiulani Hotel, Honolulu
- 1973 • American Savings and Loan Art Gallery, Honolulu
- 1975 • Kennedy Theatre, University of Hawai'i
- 1983 • Focus Gallery, Honolulu Academy of Arts
- 1989 • Fotóművészeti Galéria, Budapest
- 1990 • Graphics Gallery, Honolulu Academy of Arts
- 1991 • Budapest Galéria, Budapest
- 1991 • Gallery Saka, Tokyo
- 2003 • Retrospective – Hungarian Museum of Photography, Kecskemét
- 2004 • Photos of Francis Haar, 1930–1980, Kassák Museum, Budapest
- 2009 • Haár Ferenc & Mineko Orisaku Photo Exhibition, Tokyu Department Store (courtesy of Embassy of the Republic of Hungary in Japan)
- 2019 • "Francis Haar: Disappearing Honolulu". John Young Museum of Art, the University of Hawai‘i at Mānoa

== Documentary films ==
- 1948 • Hamajo Fishing Village, Palmer Pictures
- 1950 • Picturesque Japan, Japan Travel Bureau
- 1951 • Students Today – Japan's Tomorrow , Australian Mission, Tokyo
- 1953 • Arts of Japan, U.S. Information Agency, Tokyo
- 1954 • Awakening, Sophia University, Tokyo
- 1955 • Japanese Calligraphy, Belgian Education Ministry
- 1959 • Ukiyoe – Prints of Japan, Art Institute of Chicago
- 1959 • Juvenile Delinquency in Chicago, Chicago Public Television
- 1961 • Hula Ho'olaulea – Traditional Dances of Hawai'i, Honolulu Academy of Arts
- 1962 • Pineapple Country Hawai'i, Pineapple Growers Association, Honolulu
- 1963 • The Other Language, AID Far East Training Center, Hawai'i
- 1964 • Tenno – Symbol and Myth, Asuka Production with Fuji Television Company, Tokyo
- 1966 • Hawaii's Asian Heritage, Island Films Production, Honolulu
- 1968 • Aala – Life and Death of a Community, B.B.H. Productions, Honolulu
- 1976 • Artists of Hawai'i, Bicentennial Commission and Hawai'i State Foundation on Culture and the Arts, Honolulu

== Works in public collections ==
- Victoria and Albert Museum, London
- Museum of Modern Art, New York
- Hawai'i State Foundation on Culture and the Arts
- Mayor's Office of Culture and the Arts, Honolulu
- The Contemporary Museum, Honolulu
- Hungarian Museum of Photography, Kecskemét
