= King Kamehameha Golf Course Clubhouse =

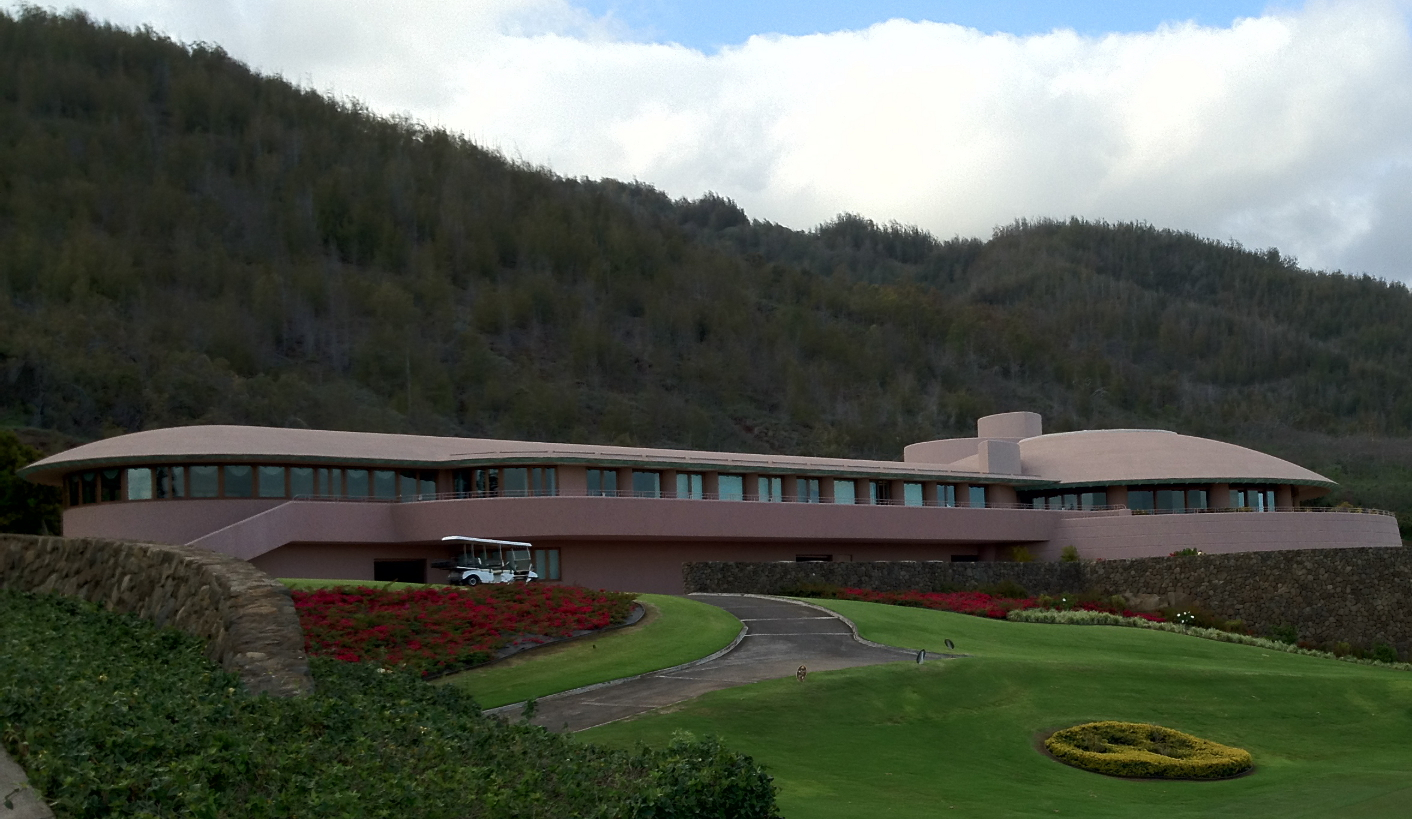
- View of the clubhouse from the south
- Interactive map of the King Kamehameha Golf Course Clubhouse area

General information
- Type: House
- Location: Waikapu, Maui, Hawaii
- Coordinates: 20.840664°N 156.518762°W
- Construction started: 1991?
- Completed: May 1993
- Cost: $25-35 million (1993 completion) $40 million (2004 overhaul)
- Governing body: MMK Maui LP

Technical details
- Floor area: 74,778 sq ft (6,947.1 m^{2})

Design and construction
- Architects: John Rattenbury; Adapted by Taliesin Architects from an original design by Frank Lloyd Wright

The King Kamehameha Golf Course Clubhouse, formerly known as the Waikapu Valley Country Club, is a building in Waikapu, Maui, Hawaii. The structure is based on an unbuilt house for playwright Arthur Miller (1957) originally conceived by American architect Frank Lloyd Wright. Wright designed the house for Arthur Miller's wife, Marilyn Monroe, but Miller and Monroe divorced soon after and the project was abandoned. The Arthur Miller house design was a modification of two previous unbuilt projects—the Raúl Baillères house (1952) and before it, the Robert F. Windfohr house (1949), also known as the "Crownfield" house.

Wright's work remained in the Taliesin archives for more than two decades until 1988 when Pundy Yokouchi and Howard Hamamoto visited Taliesin Architects in Scottsdale, Arizona, and expressed interest in building a Frank Lloyd Wright-designed golf clubhouse. Architect John Rattenbury combined all three unfinished Wright designs, enlarged them to meet the spatial requirements of a commercial clubhouse, and designed it to fit into the natural landscape of Waikapu's hilly terrain. Construction of the clubhouse was completed in 1993.

Located at an elevation of 750 feet in the foothills of the West Maui Mountains, the clubhouse looks out across the sugarcane-filled valley of Central Maui's isthmus towards the Upcountry slopes of the Haleakalā volcano in the east, with panoramic coastal views of Ma'alaea Bay in the south and Ho‘okipa Bay in the north.

== History ==
In February 1949, Robert F. Windfohr and his wife Anne Valliant Burnett Tandy asked architect Frank Lloyd Wright to design a luxury home for them on the prairie of Fort Worth, Texas. Calling it "Crownfield", Wright designed it in a short period of time, and the Windfohr's discussed modifications, but the project never went anywhere.The Crownfield design was altered in 1952 for Mexican government official Raúl Baillères who planned to build the home in Acapulco, Mexico. Nothing came of the project. Then, in 1957, Marilyn Monroe contacted Wright about building a home for her and her husband Arthur Miller in Roxbury, Connecticut. Wright expanded the original plans for Crownfield, complete with movie theater, pool, and nursery for the children Miller and Monroe planned to have. But the marriage did not last and Wright died shortly after, leaving the unfinished plans archived at Taliesin West.

In 1984, businessman Sandy Sims first contacted the Frank Lloyd Wright Foundation in Scottsdale, Arizona, and proposed a Golf course development and subdivision using unbuilt designs from Wright's archives to construct Wright-designed residences on the course. Developers Pundy Yokouchi and Howard Hamamoto contacted Taliesin Architects and requested an original Frank Lloyd Wright design for a golf clubhouse in Waikapu, Maui, Hawaii. Architect John Rattenbury combined all three designs to produce a new structure that fit into the Waikapu landscape. Due to a period of drought on Maui, the second stage of the project involving a subdivision composed of 30 Wright-designed homes was put on hold and was never built. Lead developer Takeshi Sekiguchi and builder Hawaiian Dredging Construction Company constructed the clubhouse from concrete and steel, completing the project in 1993.

The clubhouse was originally owned by the Waikapu Valley Country Club, and later, the Grand Waikapu Golf Resort and Spa which changed ownership and closed in 1999. During this time, the clubhouse remained open and was used for special events. In 2004, Makoto Kaneko purchased the business for $12.5 million and invested $40 million in restoring the property. It re-opened in 2006 as the King Kamehameha Golf Course Clubhouse.

== Features ==
The building is split into three levels with two-thirds of the structure underground, with a total area of 74,778 square feet. Copper fascia surrounds the domed roofs of the building which fits into the landscape of the West Maui Mountains behind it and the golf course bunkers in front.

The upper level has an area of 20,421 square feet. It includes the lobby, pro shop, meeting rooms, dining room, and kitchen. There are three banquet meeting rooms. The dining room features a 100-foot dome roof with a central 25 foot skylight. At 3,800 sq. feet, the pro shop is the largest in the state of Hawaii. The mid level of the building has an area of 26,741 square feet. The lower level has an area of 27,616 square feet and contains locker rooms for men and women, Japanese baths, golf cart parking and maintenance facilities.

The main stairwell sits beneath a stained glass sky panel based on Wright's original butterfly art glass design over the entrance of the Dana–Thomas House in Springfield, Illinois.

Endemic nene (Branta sandvicensis) geese live on the grounds. Native plants in the area include ʻilima (Sida fallax) and 'akia (Wikstroemia foetida). Common tropical trees and plants on the grounds include plumeria, hibiscus, Cook pine (Araucaria columnaris), monkeypod (Albizia saman), and Bougainvillea.

== Art collection ==
The clubhouse contains an extensive collection of artwork honoring the culture of Hawaii, including a painting by Herb Kawainui Kāne, featherwork by Jo-Anne Kahanamoku-Sterling, kapa by Puanani Van Dorpe, bronze sculptures by Dale Zarella, and a portrait by Tonia Marks Baney.

== Popular culture ==
The golf course served the location as the Finish Line for the 14th season of the 2009 American reality television program The Amazing Race.

== See also ==
- List of Frank Lloyd Wright works by location
- List of Frank Lloyd Wright works
