= Hawaiiana =

History and culture of Hawaiʻi

Hawaiiana is a broad term referring to the history, culture, language, arts, traditions, artifacts, and material culture associated with Hawaiʻi and the Native Hawaiian people. The term is commonly used in museums, archives, libraries, academia, and collecting communities to describe cultural and historical works related to the Hawaiian Islands.

Hawaiiana may include both traditional Native Hawaiian cultural expressions and later historical materials connected to the Hawaiian Kingdom, the Territory of Hawaiʻi, and modern Hawaiʻi.

The term encompasses a wide range of subjects, including Hawaiian mythology, hula, mele (songs and chants), surfing, canoe voyaging, royal memorabilia, Hawaiian-language newspapers, lei-making, kapa cloth, traditional navigation, music, and visual arts. Collections of Hawaiiana often preserve documents and artifacts connected to the aliʻi (Hawaiian nobility), the Hawaiian monarchy, and everyday life in Hawaiʻi across different historical periods.

Although the exact origin of the word is debated, “Hawaiiana” became widely used during the twentieth century, particularly in cultural preservation, tourism, and collecting circles. The word parallels terms such as “Americana,” referring to objects and traditions associated with American culture. Scholars have noted that Hawaiiana can refer both to authentic Native Hawaiian cultural traditions and to commercialized or romanticized representations of Hawaiʻi created during the tourism boom of the twentieth century.

Major institutions preserving Hawaiiana include the Bernice Pauahi Bishop Museum, the Hawaiian Historical Society, and the University of Hawaiʻi libraries. These collections contain manuscripts, photographs, newspapers, maps, oral histories, royal artifacts, and ethnographic materials documenting Hawaiian history and culture.

== Examples of Hawaiiana ==
Items and traditions commonly classified as Hawaiiana include:

Hula and traditional chant (mele)

Hawaiian-language literature and newspapers

Hawaiian mythology and folklore

Surfing history and artifacts

Lei-making traditions

Kapa (bark cloth)

Feather cloaks and royal regalia

Slack-key guitar and Hawaiian music

Vintage aloha shirts and tourism posters

Canoe voyaging and navigation traditions

Historical photographs and postcards of Hawaiʻi

Materials relating to the Hawaiian Kingdom and Hawaiian royalty

== Hawaiiana and Native Hawaiian culture ==
Some scholars distinguish between “Hawaiiana” and Native Hawaiian culture itself. In this usage, Native Hawaiian culture refers specifically to the living traditions and practices of the Indigenous Hawaiian people, while Hawaiiana may also include outsider depictions, commercial products, tourism imagery, and collectible memorabilia associated with Hawaiʻi.

The growth of tourism in the early and mid-twentieth century helped popularize Hawaiiana internationally through hotels, films, postcards, music recordings, tiki culture, and mass-produced souvenirs. At the same time, Native Hawaiian cultural practitioners and historians have worked to preserve and revitalize traditional Hawaiian language, hula, navigation, and arts.

== In popular culture ==
Hawaiiana has had a significant influence on popular culture both within Hawaiʻi and internationally, particularly through tourism, music, film, fashion, and themed entertainment. During the twentieth century, images associated with Hawaiʻi such as palm trees, hula dancers, tiki imagery, surf culture, and aloha shirts became widely recognized cultural symbols in the United States and abroad.

The expansion of tourism in Hawaiʻi after World War II contributed heavily to the commercialization of Hawaiiana. Hotels, airlines, restaurants, and souvenir industries promoted stylized depictions of Hawaiian culture to visitors, helping popularize Hawaiian music, tiki bars, luaus, and tropical-themed décor throughout the continental United States.

Hawaiiana has also appeared extensively in film and television. Hollywood productions such as Blue Hawaii (1961), starring Elvis Presley, helped popularize romanticized depictions of Hawaiʻi and Hawaiian music among mainland American audiences. Animated and family-oriented works such as Lilo & Stitch introduced aspects of Hawaiian language, music, and local culture to international audiences.

In music, the popularity of the steel guitar and Hawaiian-influenced music styles in the early twentieth century helped shape genres including country and easy listening music. Hawaiian musicians such as Don Ho and Israel Kamakawiwoʻole became internationally recognized figures associated with Hawaiiana and Hawaiian music traditions.

Surf culture, often associated with Hawaiiana, became globally influential during the twentieth century through Hawaiian surfers, competitions, photography, and media representations of Waikīkī and the North Shore of Oʻahu. The imagery and aesthetics of Hawaiiana continue to influence fashion, interior design, advertising, and themed entertainment worldwide.

== See also ==
- Americana
- Tiki culture
