= Gladys Kamakakuokalani Brandt =

Native Hawaiian educator and indigenous rights activist

Gladys Kamakakūokalani ʻAinoa Brandt
- Born: August 20, 1906; Honolulu, Territory of Hawaii
- Died: January 15, 2003 (aged 96); Honolulu, Territory of Hawaii

Gladys Kamakakūokalani ʻAinoa Brandt (August 20, 1906 – January 15, 2003) was an American Hawaiian educator and civic leader in Hawaii. She served as a principal at Kamehameha Schools and helped found the University of Hawaii's Hawaiian Studies Center, leading to a revival of interest in native Hawaiian culture. Later, she led protests against the trustees of Kamehameha Schools for financial mismanagement, leading to their replacement.

== Biography ==
=== Early life ===
Gladys Kamakakūokalani ʻAinoa Brandt was born in Honolulu on August 20, 1906. Her father, David Kanuha, was involved in the 1895 Wilcox rebellion, a Hawaiian counter-revolutionary movement of royalist Robert William Wilcox, by royalists who opposed the overthrow of the Hawaiian Kingdom and working to restore the monarchy of Liliʻuokalani. Arrested and convicted of treason for his beliefs, Kanuha was elected to the new territorial legislature. She attended the funeral of the last reigning monarch of the Kingdom of Hawaii, Queen Liliʻuokalani's in 1917, one of many events marking the social changes to Hawaiian culture.

She denied her culture as a child, ignored her language, and rubbed her skin with lemon juice to try to whiten it. However, she took self-determined leaps towards embracing her Hawaiian roots in the 1960s and 1970s, and fought to rebuild them.

For a time as a young child, she attended Kamehameha School for Girls and was raised by its first principal, Ida May Pope.

When Brandt was 16, her father changed the family name to ʻAinoa (her mother was Esther Aionoa), meaning "to eat in freedom" in the Hawaiian language. It was a reference to the ʻAi Noa period of freedom after a king of ancient Hawaii had died, and the particular one in 1819 which marked the major changes to the Hawaiian social system.

=== Career in education ===
Brandt graduated from President William McKinley High School in 1925. She received a teaching certificate from the University of Hawaii (then called Hawaii Normal School), and married Isaac Brandt in 1927. She first taught in public schools on the island of Maui, and then Kauaʻi. In 1943, she received a bachelor's degree in education from the University of Hawaii. She then became Hawaii's first woman public school principal. She was the first woman to be named superintendent of schools, in 1962 on Kauaʻi island.

She then moved on to become the principal of the Kamehameha School for Girls in 1963. Although the institute was created distinctly for Hawaiians, Gladys was its first Native Hawaiian principal. She was promoted to director of the high school division in 1969, serving until 1971. When she invited Hawaiian culture expert Nona Beamer to teach, Beamer insisted that traditional standing hula, which had been banned as being "indecent" for girls, would be required.

=== Later years ===
Although officially retired in 1971, after 44 years of being an educator, Brandt served on various boards and officers of civic organizations. In 1983, Governor of Hawaii George Ariyoshi appointed her to the Board of Regents of the University of Hawaii. She served until 1986, and was chair for four years. She lobbied the legislature to fund the UH Center for Hawaiian Studies, which offers both an undergraduate and master's degree (starting in 2005). It was named after her Hawaiian name Kamakakūokalani in 2002.

In 1985, Brandt was named a Living Treasure of Hawaii, by the Honpa Hongwanji Mission of Hawaii.

In 1997, Brandt co-authored two essays known as "Broken Trust", which criticized Kamehameha Schools, the largest private landowner in Hawaii, resulting in their reorganization. In 1998, Governor Ben Cayetano appointed her a trustee of the Office of Hawaiian Affairs.

=== Legacy ===
Brandt died on January 15, 2003, in Honolulu. Cayetano said "I never met anyone who was so widely respected across all ethnicities." Senator Daniel Akaka praised Brandt for championing education as most important to the future of the Native Hawaiian people, instead of anger or fear.
