= Agnes C. Conrad =

American archivist

- Born: Agnes Catherine Conrad; September 7, 1917; California
- Died: January 10, 2011 (aged 93); Honolulu, Hawaii, United States
- Education: Holy Names College (BA), University of California, Los Angeles
- Occupations: American historian, archivist of Hawaiian history, editor
- Known for: State Archivist of Hawaii

Agnes Catherine Conrad (September 7, 1917 – January 10, 2011) was an American archivist and historian who was an expert in Hawaiian history.

== Early life ==
Conrad was raised on Santa Catalina Island, one of the Channel Islands off the coast of California. Conrad graduated from Holy Names College (later Holy Names University) in Oakland, California and University of California, Los Angeles Library School in 1940.

== Career ==
Conrad served as a librarian at the United States Army Air Force base in Victorville, California during World War II. Followed by then working as the librarian at the University of California, Los Angeles from 1945 to 1950.

She moved to Hawaii in 1950 and was a librarian at the University of Hawaiʻi. Appointed the Territorial Archivist in 1955 and served as the State Archivist from 1959 to 1982, Conrad founded the archives profession in Hawaii including promoting and facilitating the construction of the Hawaii State Archives. She was involved in the Judicial History Center, founding member of the Hawaii Museums Association, Friends of ʻIolani Palace, contributing significantly to its restoration, Hawaiian Historical Society, serving as president from 1967 to 1969, Society of American Archivists, where she was a Fellow in 1964, Hawaii Library Association, where she served as president starting in 1962, and the Association of Hawaii Archivists. She also was the associate editor of the Hawaiian Journal of History in 1969.

== Awards ==
Conrad was awarded the Living Treasure of Hawai'i award by the Honpa Hongwanji Mission of Hawaii in 1987. In 2009, she was given the Governor's Award for Distinguished Achievement in Arts and Humanities by Hawaiian Governor Linda Lingle. The Association of Hawaii Archivists established the Agnes C. Conrad Award in 2005 to recognize giants in the archives field in Hawaii.

== Later life ==
She died on January 10, 2011, in Honolulu, Hawaii.

== Published works ==
- "Sources for Family History in Hawaii" in the Mormon Pacific Historical Society
- "The Archives of Hawaii" in The Journal of Pacific History
- The Folding Cliffs: A Narrative of 19th-Century Hawaii by W. S. Merwin, fact edited by Agnes C. Conrad
- Don Francisco de Paula Marin: The Letters and Journal of Francisco de Paula Marin by Ross H. Gast and edited by Agnes C. Conrad
- Hawaiian Registered Vessels in the Hawaiian Journal of History
- THE WRITTEN RECORD OF HAWAI'I'S WOMEN: An Annotated Guide to Sources of Information in Hawai'i compiled by Chieko Tachihata and Agnes Conrad
