= Edith Kawelohea McKinzie =

American genealogist and hula expert (1925–2014)

- Born: Edith Kawelohea Kapule; October 22, 1925; Honolulu, Territory of Hawaiʻi, U.S.
- Died: October 21, 2014 (aged 88)
- Education: BA, MA, PD, University of Hawaiʻi
- Occupations: Genealogist; educator; author; hula and chant expert
- Notable work: Hawaiian Genealogies
- Spouse: Clayton McKinzie (m. 1946)
- Children: 1
- Awards: Living Treasure of Hawaii (2004)

Edith Kawelohea Kapule McKinzie (October 22, 1925 – October 21, 2014) was an American genealogist, educator, author, and expert in hula and chant. A Kanaka Maoli, or Native Hawaiian, Edith published two books on Hawaiian genealogy, was director of the Hawaiian Language Newspaper Indexing Project, and taught traditional hula and chant across the United States. In 2004, she was named a Living Treasure of Hawaii for her contributions to Hawaiian culture and heritage.

== Early life ==
Edith Kawelohea Kapule was born on October 22, 1925, in Honolulu, Hawaii. She was the eldest of three siblings, with a sister named Alexandra and a brother named Harry Jr. Their father, Harry Kawelo Kapule, was a Hawaiian from Holualoa, and their mother, Caroline "Carrie" Costa, was a Portuguese woman living in Pauoa.

Kapule graduated from McKinley High School (Honolulu) and went on to study at the University of Hawaiʻi, earning an undergraduate degree in Hawaiian Studies, a master's degree in education, Curriculum and Instruction, and a Professional Diploma (P.D.) in Secondary Education.

In 1946, she married Clayton McKinzie of St. Louis, Missouri. They had one daughter named Joleen Hokuloa McKinzie and raised four stepchildren from Clayton's earlier life.

== Academic career ==
McKinzie was the first professor of Hawaiian Studies at the Honolulu Community College, holding the position from 1978 to 1997. Later, she lectured at the University of Hawaii's College of Continuing Education, teaching local genealogy and mele hula, and she also taught chanting for the State Council on Hawaiian Heritage.

She was known for her extensive work on Hawaiian genealogy, publishing two volumes of Hawaiian Genealogies. McKinzie also researched the genealogy of the chiefs of Kahoolawe for the Kahoolawe Island Reserve Commission.

McKinzie served as chairwoman for the University of Hawaii's Committee for the Preservation and Study of Hawaiian Language, Art and Culture.

Working with the Bishop Museum, McKinzie established the Hawaiian Language Newspaper Indexing and Cataloguing Project from 1992 to 2005, organizing a team of scholars to index and catalogue articles, notices, and advertisements from early 19th- and 20th-century Hawaiian-language newspapers. Members of the project included Kimo Keaulana, William Kalikolehua Pānui, Makalapua Alencastre, Noelani Arista, and Keawe Lopes. McKinzie served as director of the project.

== HulaMak ==
McKinzie first began learning about traditional Hawaiian hula, music, and language at home with her family and was encouraged by her aunt Mary Kapule, who had formerly danced for famed Kumu Hula Anton Ka`ö`ö. At the age of 12, McKinzie began her formal hula and chant training with Joseph `Īlālāʻole.

As an adult, McKinzie taught hula across Hawaii, the U.S. mainland, Guam, Midway Island, and Alaska. After she opened a dance school at Guam, McKinzie was invited by dancers Ted Shawn and La Meri to teach Hawaiian dance at Jacob's Pillow in Lee, Massachusetts. She also became a frequent judge in hula competitions. In 2012, McKinzie attended the annual Malia Craver Hula Kahiko Competition as a presenter, awarding the Edith Kawelohea McKinzie Overall Trophy to Kamehameha High School.

== Honours and societies ==
McKinzie joined the Ahahui Ka’ahumanu society in 1949. She was also a member of the Order of the Eastern Star, and received the title Worthy Matron in 1965.

Over the years, McKinzie was recognized for her cultural work with the Pulama Award from the Kalihi-Palama Culture and Arts Society, the Order of Distinction from the State Council on Hawaiian Heritage and the Ke Kukui Malamalama from the Office of Hawaiian Affairs. She received the Ambassador of Hawaii Award from Hawaiian Governor John Waihe’e, and the David Malo award from the Rotary Club of West Oahu.

In 2004, McKinzie was named a Living Treasure of Hawaii by the Honpa Hongwanji Mission of Hawaii for her efforts in fostering traditional Hawaiian culture.

== Death ==
On October 21, 2014, McKinzie died just a few hours before her 89th birthday. She was interred in the Valley of the Temples Memorial Park. Abigail K. Kawananakoa, a member of Hawaii's royal family and a longtime friend of McKinzie, released a statement: "Edith McKinzie guided me into the world of genealogy and opened the door to the true history of the Hawaiian people. My profound aloha to you Aunty Edith."
