= Hawaii Opera Theatre =

Non-profit organisation

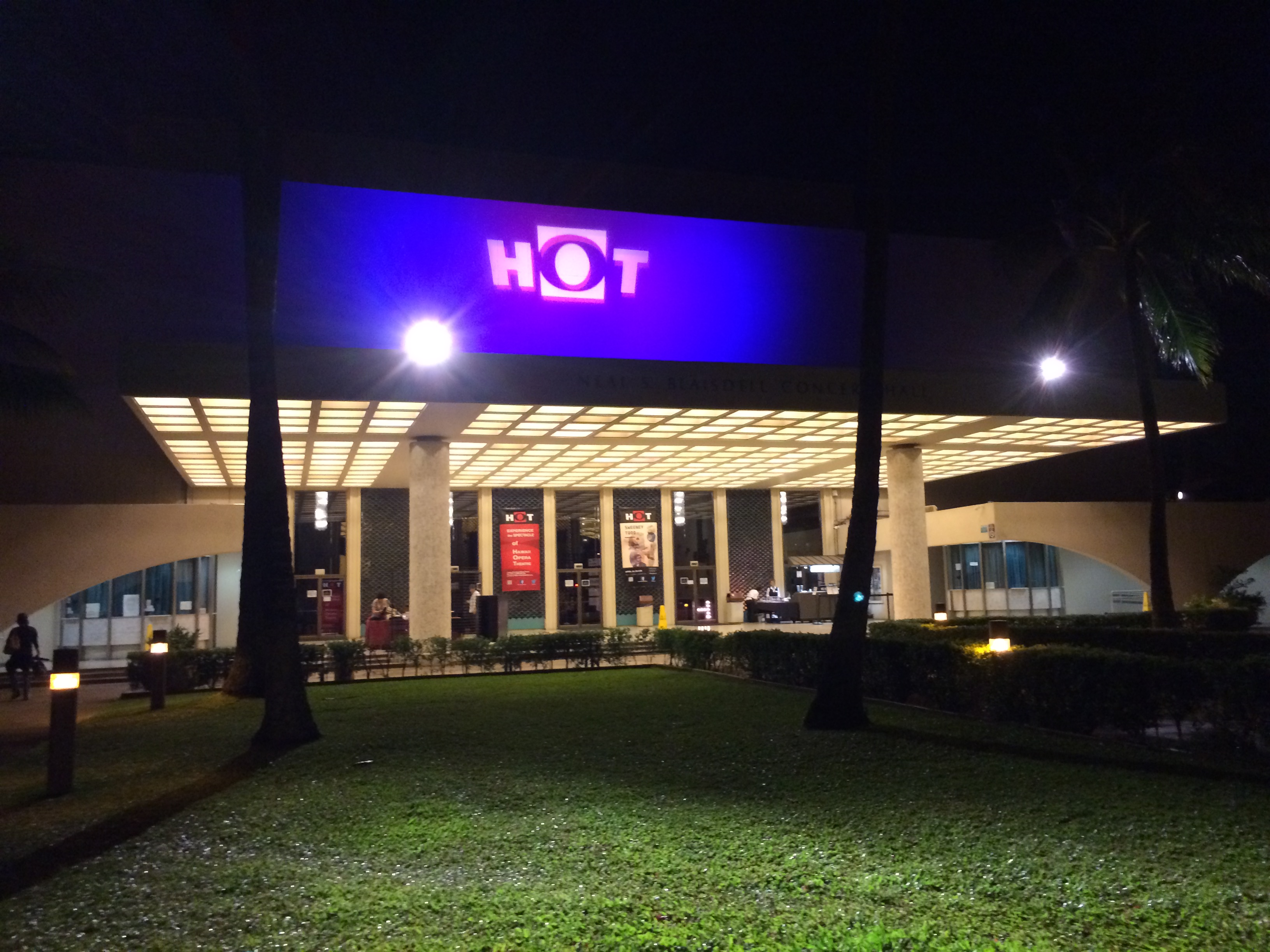
Hawaii Opera Theatre at the Neal S. Blaisdell Center, Honolulu, Hawaii.

The Hawaii Opera Theatre (HOT) is the islands' only major opera company established in 1960. The company performs three or more operas in a season. Opera seasons start in October and end in the early summer of the following year. It performs mostly in the Blaisdell Concert Hall, Honolulu.

HOT performs most of its mainstage productions at the Blaisdell Concert Hall and has also staged works at the historic Hawaii Theatre, warehouses, the Chinatown Artist Lofts, and other funky venues. Since 2004 HOT has added a summer production of a comic opera by Gilbert and Sullivan or a musical, and in 2016 will stage a concert production of Verdi's Rigoletto starring Hawaii's own baritone, Quinn Kelsey. Kelsey began his career as a chorus member in HOT's acclaimed volunteer chorus, and has gone on to shine on stages across the world.

== History ==
The first opera ever presented by the organization was Puccini's Madama Butterfly, which was performed in McKinley High School auditorium in Honolulu in 1961. For the next two decades the company was part of the Honolulu Symphony. In 1980 it became an independent tax-exempt corporation. The first independent season was in 1981 and consisted of three productions: La Bohème, Lucia di Lammermoor, and Carmen. Supertitles were introduced in 1987 and 1989 was the first year in which all available seats were sold before opening night. By 1993 HOT membership had exceeded 2,000 individuals. The company is currently led by Interim General Director Andrew Morgan.

The year 2002 saw HOT's "Bad Girl Season" with productions of La traviata, Salome, and Carmen. Sets and costumes for Salome were designed by artist Thomas Woodruff. The 2007 production of Madama Butterfly, a co-production with Opera Omaha, featured set and costume designs by the visual artist Jun Kaneko.

The Summer Season was launched in 2004 with Gilbert and Sullivan's The Mikado, followed by The Pirates of Penzance (2005), The King and I with Richard Chamberlain (2006), South Pacific (2007), and A Little Night Music (2008). The summer production for 2009 was cancelled for budgetary reasons. Charity Navigator has awarded the company its top "4-star" rating for responsible fiscal management since 2007.

In 2014, HOT staged a modern production of Gilbert and Sullivan's The Mikado in Honolulu and on Maui. Akina led his artistic team in creating a presentation that included anime, harajuku girls, and yakuza-inspired characters.

In 2015, HOT launched its Opera in a Warehouse initiative. A part of its #ImHOT campaign to take opera into the community and develop a new generation of opera goers, the company staged Jonathan Dove's chamber opera, Siren Song, a story of a young sailor involved in a catfish scandal. The company took over an empty warehouse in the arts district of Kaka'ako and turned it into a production venue. Siren Song, directed by Akina, received rave reviews and combined a modern, relevant story with the designs by video designer Adam Turner dancing on the white warehouse walls to create a once-in-a-lifetime experience.

In 2016, HOT added two special one-night only concerts to its calendar including Rigoletto in Concert starring Hawaii's Quinn Kelsey and the Hawaii debut of the internationally acclaimed trio Sol3 Mio. A family of classically trained singers from New Zealand, Sol3 Mio presents a blend of opera and pop that have thrilled audiences around the world.

In 2022, HOT presented "Re-Emerging: HOT Live in Concert" as its first fully live mainstage production of the season after the COVID-19 pandemic had started.

In 2024, HOT staged a production of Puccini's "La bohème" featuring an all-Asian cast. Due to renovations being done in the Blaisdell Concert Hall, it was performed at the Waikiki Shell as an outdoor semi-staged production.

HOT's 2025–26 season features the world premiere of "Kamalehua: The Sheltering Tree" notably the first opera to be written and performed primarily in ʻŌlelo Hawaiʻi telling the true story of Timoteo Kamalehua Haʻalilio, a 19th-century Hawaiian diplomat and national hero whose courageous mission helped secure international recognition of Hawaiʻi's sovereignty. This opera features music composed by Herb Mahelona with words by playwright Victoria Nālani Kneubuhl under the direction of Patrick Makuakāne.

== Educational programs ==
A classroom-based education program was begun in 1981 and was expanded to more elementary and high school grade levels in 1984. A program called "Opera Highlights" became part of the curriculum of the University of Hawaii's College of Continuing Education in 1983. HOT now has several educational programs, most notably its "Opera For Everyone" (OFE) program. OFE allows students to participate in all aspects of an opera production from technical crew to performing to simply watching an opera. The final dress rehearsal is opened up to students for a reduced price, usually on a Wednesday night. Other aspects of the show are assisted by OFE participants who can help in such aspects as set building, costuming and makeup, or performance. This is a rare opportunity offered to students who may pursue careers in opera in the future, and is one of the programs that makes HOT unique.

HOT's Education Team serves over 25,000 keiki and adult learners each year through its innovative programming. The OFE program stages over 75 performances at schools on multiple islands throughout the State of Hawaii.

== See also ==
- Beebe Freitas – Former Head of Music
