= Quinn Kelsey =

American baritone (born 1978)

Quinn Kamakanalani Kelsey (born 7 March 1978) is a Hawaiian baritone, who is particularly noted for his performances in operas by Verdi. He has been featured in leading roles by the Metropolitan Opera in New York City, as well as other major opera companies in America and Europe.

== Early life and training ==
Kelsey was born in Honolulu, Hawaii, and began performing opera in 1991 as a chorus member of the Hawaii Opera Theatre. He received his bachelor's degree in music with a major in vocal performance from the University of Hawaii at Manoa under John W. Mount. He has studied in the following programs: Chautauqua Institute with Marlena Malas, San Francisco's Merola Opera Program under Sherry Greenwald and Mark Morash, and three years at Chicago's Lyric Opera Center for American Artists (now known as the Ryan Opera Center), during which he sang Wagner in Gounod's Faust and Yamadori and the Registrar in Puccini's Madama Butterfly. He was also on the roster of the Marilyn Horne Foundation for two years, won a scholarship from the Solti Foundation of Chicago in 2003, was a finalist of the Plácido Domingo Operalia Competition in 2004, and represented the United States in the BBC Cardiff Singer of the World Competition in 2005.

== Operatic career ==
Kelsey made his debut at the Metropolitan Opera in New York City as Schaunard in Puccini's La bohème on 29 March 2008. Other roles at the Met have included Monterone in Verdi's Rigoletto (role debut on 13 January 2011), Marcello in Puccini's La bohème (23 September 2014), Germont in Verdi's La traviata (11 December 2014), Peter in Humperdinck's Hänsel und Gretel (18 December 2017), the Count di Luna in Verdi's Il trovatore (23 January 2018), Enrico in Donizetti's Lucia di Lammermoor (25 April 2018), and Amonasro in Verdi's Aida (26 September 2018).

He sang Zurga in Bizet's The Pearl Fishers at the London Coliseum with the English National Opera beginning on 1 June 2010, his first appearance with the company. His debut at the Royal Opera House was in 2016, as Germont in La traviata, and he also performed there the Count di Luna in Il trovatore.

He debuted with the Santa Fe Opera on 4 August 2015 in the title role of Verdi's Rigoletto, his singing described by Zachary Woolfe of The New York Times as "glamorous and persuasive, his roomy voice smoky, with bronzed tenorial resonances as its rises."

He has also appeared with the Canadian Opera Company, Zürich Opera, Hawaii Opera Theater, Norwegian National Opera, Semperoper Dresden, Rome Opera, Deutsche Oper Berlin, Frankfurt Opera, the Bregenz Festival and the Edinburgh Festival, and his roles have included the Forester in Janáček's The Cunning Little Vixen, Athanaël in Massenet's Thaïs, and Sancho Panza in Massenet's Don Quichotte.

He sang the title role in Verdi's Rigoletto at the Opéra Bastille in a production by the Opéra National de Paris on 2 May 2016, a performance in which he is said to have "electrified the capacity audience". This production is available as a video. He also sang the role at the San Francisco Opera and the Chicago Lyric Opera in 2017.

Kelsey sang the role of Germont in La traviata at the Metropolitan Opera on 4 December 2018, a new production and the first appearance of Yannick Nézet-Séguin as the Met's new music director. Violetta was sung by Diana Damrau, and Alfredo, by Juan Diego Flórez. F. Paul Driscoll, in his review of the performance in Opera News, wrote: "All of the leading roles were sung with distinction, but Quinn Kelsey's splendid Giorgio Germont was the most satisfactory of the three principal performances. Kelsey's hefty, mahogany-colored baritone is ideal for Germont's music, and his shrewd, dignified command of the drama made his Act II meeting with Violetta eminently affecting..." The fourth performance with this cast (15 December) was simulcast as part of the Metropolitan Opera Live in HD series.

He made his role debut as Scarpia in Puccini's Tosca on 5 May 2021 (during the COVID-19 pandemic) in a "heavily deconstructed concert performance" with Opera Philadelphia at the Mann Center for the Performing Arts, an amphitheatre in Philadelphia's Fairmount Park. Ana María Martínez sang Tosca, and Brian Jagde, Cavaradossi. Opera magazine declared that Kelsey "nearly stole the show with his oaken timbre, incisive phrasing and seductively evil approach." His stage debut in the role followed soon thereafter (23 July) with the Cincinnati Opera at the outdoor venue of Summit Park (built on the site of the former Blue Ash Airport). Martínez was again Tosca, while Russell Thomas sang Cavaradossi. Opera commented that "Kelsey brought to Scarpia a nuanced evil, with his stated preference for 'violent conquests' over romantic encounters rendered even more chilling by his oily charm."

In August 2021 he performed the role of Tonio in Lyric Opera's online video of Ruggero Leoncavallo's Pagliacci. The cast included Russell Thomas as Canio, Ailyn Pérez as Nedda, and Lucas Meachem as Silvio. Enrique Mazzola conducted.

Kelsey sang the title role of Rigoletto for the first time at the Metropolitan Opera on 31 December 2021, in a new production by Bartlett Sher with sets by Michael Yeargan and costumes by Catherine Zuber. The cast included Rosa Feola as Gilda and Piotr Beczała as the Duke, and the performance was conducted by Daniele Rustioni. Anthony Tommasini, music critic of The New York Times, wrote: "The baritone Quinn Kelsey, a Met stalwart for over a decade, had a breakthrough as the jester Rigoletto, part of the retinue of the lecherous Duke of Mantua. With his brawny, penetrating voice and imposing presence, Kelsey has always been an arresting artist. But this role shows off his full vocal and dramatic depth." F. Paul Driscoll of Opera News reported: "Center stage was the prodigious Quinn Kelsey, in his first local performance as Rigoletto, a role he has previously sung with ten major companies in the U.S. and Europe. Kelsey was superlative, fully realizing Rigoletto's sharp wit, titanic anger and paternal tenderness—and singing with the handsome, burnished tone, incisive prosody and charismatic presence worthy of a true Verdian. The opening-night audience cheered him to the echo, and deservedly so." The performance of 29 January 2022, with the same cast and conductor, was simulcast as part of the Metropolitan Opera Live in HD series.

Kelsey made his debut in the title role of Verdi's Macbeth on 28 April 2023, with the Canadian Opera Company in Toronto in a production by David McVicar conducted by Speranza Scappucci. Joseph So of Opera magazine wrote: "The COC hit the jackpot with Quinn Kelsey in the title role. His Macbeth on opening night was sensational, delighting the audience with his huge, warm Verdi baritone and searing dramatic power...".

After having appeared in the supporting role of Paolo in Verdi's Simon Boccanegra in Chicago and Rome in 2012, Kelsey gave his first performance of the title role on 22 September 2023 with Opera Philadelphia in a production by Laurence Dale conducted by Corrado Rovaris. Alex Baker of Washington Classical Review wrote: "The special quality that Quinn Kelsey brings to Verdi's signature baritone roles needs little introduction at this point. He was in complete command of the stage here, fully inhabiting Boccanegra's many facets, from loving father to voluble autocrat to rueful old man." Cameron Kelsall, writing for the online music magazine Bachtrack, also praised Kelsey's singing and interpretation of the role:

For his first outing in the title role, Quinn Kelsey continues to burnish his bona fides as the premier Verdi baritone of his generation. Although he never struggled with vocal projection, he favored lyricism throughout, shading his melting legato singing with suggestions of age and indecision rather than barking lines to convey Boccanegra's mounting psychological distress. His final utterances sounded appropriately haunted, although his robust tonal beauty remained. With the assistance of Fernand Ruiz's costumes, he demonstrated his character's evolution from simple corsair to grand ruler, and throughout the opera's later acts, he reminded the audience that Boccanegra is still a fundamentally good man at his core.

Kelsey made his role debut as Renato in Verdi's Un ballo in maschera on 20 October 2023 at the Metropolitan Opera. Charles Castronovo sang Ricardo and Angela Meade, Amelia. The conductor was Carlo Rizzi. Zachary Woolfe of The New York Times reported: "One singer required no warming up: the baritone Quinn Kelsey, who seems ever more a pillar of the Met, particularly in Verdi. ... His and Meade's back-to-back arias in the third act — her plea "Morrò, ma prima in grazia" into his wounded "Eri tu" — were together the musical highlight on Friday."

He performed Scarpia in Puccini's Tosca at the Metropolitan Opera for the first time on 12 November 2024. The cast included Lise Davidsen in the title role and Freddie De Tommaso as Cavaradossi. Yannick Nézet-Séguin conducted. The fourth and final performance of the season with this cast (on 23 November) was presented as part of the Metropolitan Opera Live in HD series. Jim Pritchard, reviewing the HD performance for the website Seen and Heard International, wrote: "I have seen and heard many wonderful Scarpias but how many have so clearly lived the part as Quinn Kelsey did or sang it with an oleaginous charm so chilling in its masking of wicked evil. Rarely has Scarpia’s lascivious sexual advances to Tosca appeared so real and it was a magnificent Met role debut, something Quinn said he had been waiting for since 1997 when singing in the chorus of a Tosca in Hawaii." On the other hand, George Loomis of Opera writes: "I'm afraid I can't share the enthusiasm others have for Quinn Kelsey. The problems begin with the voice itself, which sounds unattractively woolly and lacking in focus. He sings intelligently, but his gruff timbre limits his expressive range. As Scarpia, he was a nasty adversary of Tosca, to be sure, but his portrayal lacked an aristocratic dimension, which is part of Scarpia’s persona, however despicable."

In May 2026, he portrayed Haʻalilio in the world premiere of the Hawaiian language opera Kamalehua: The Sheltering Tree (based on said figure's service under Kamehameha III) at the Hawaii Opera Theatre in Neal S. Blaisdell Concert Hall. He also co-produced this performance, with Patrick Makuakāne as director and choreographer.

== Personal life ==
Kelsey met his former wife, soprano Marjorie Owens, originally from Chesapeake, Virginia, when both were resident at the Ryan Opera Center in Chicago. Kelsey and Owens occasionally sang together on tour, performing Il trovatore in Dresden and giving duo recitals, for instance, in Honolulu (25 January 2015); in Santa Fe (2 August 2015), where Kelsey was performing in Rigoletto; and in New York City (10 December 2017) at the Morgan Library's Gilder Lehrman Hall. Chicago remains as Kelsey's main home base. He became engaged to Canadian mezzo-soprano Deanna Pauletto in 2018 and they welcomed their daughter Leonora Kelsey to the world in 2023.

Quinn enjoys cigars and has been featured in Cigar Aficionado magazine.

== Awards ==
In 2015, Kelsey was the recipient of the Met's Beverly Sills Artist Award and in 2022, one of the 17th annual Opera News Awards (along with Denyce Graves and Elsa van den Heever), awarded by Opera News magazine.

== Videos ==
Videos of complete operas have been made in which he performs the following roles:

- Schaunard in Puccini's La bohème (5 April 2008), Met Opera on Demand
- Gamekeeper in Janáček's The Cunning Little Vixen (8 November 2009), Florence May Festival, Arthaus Musik
- Rigoletto in Verdi's Rigoletto (2016), Paris Opera Play; (29 January 2022), Met Opera on Demand
- Amonasro in Verdi's Aida (6 October 2018 and 25 January 2025), Met Opera on Demand; (2022) Semperoper, Dresden
- Germont in Verdi's La traviata (15 December 2018), Met Opera on Demand
- Tonio in Leoncavallo's Pagliacci (August 2021), Lyric Opera of Chicago
- Filippo Visconti in Bellini's Beatrice di Tenda (2024), Paris Opera Play
- Scarpia in Puccini's Tosca (23 November 2024), Met Opera on Demand
