= Irmgard Farden Aluli =

Hawaiian songwriter and performer (1911–2001)

"Auntie" Irmgard Keali'iwahinealohanohokahaopuamana Farden Aluli (October 7, 1911 – October 4, 2001) was a Hawaiian composer who wrote over 200 songs. In Hawaii, she was considered a haku mele, or maker of songs. Aluli is considered the most prolific woman composer of Hawaii since Queen Lili'uokalani. She is the fourth person to be honored twice for a Lifetime Achievement Award by the Hawai'i Academy of Recording Arts (HARA). She has also been inducted into the Hawaiian Music Hall of Fame.

== Biography ==
Aluli was born in Pu‘unoa, Lahaina, on the island of Maui, in the then territory of Hawai‘i, on October 7, 1911. She was born into the large Farden family of Lahaina; one of Hawaiʻi’s foremost musical families. Aluli was one of 13 children (Margaret, Annie, Carl, Bernard, Emma, Maude, Aurora, Diana, Irmgard, Rudolph, Lurina, Edna & Llewellyn "Buddy"). Her parents were Annie Kahalepouli (Bastel Shaw) Farden and Charles (née Karl) Kekua Farden. Aluli was of Hawaiian, French-German and Hungarian ancestry.

Aluli first started performing publicly with the Annie Kerr Trio in 1925. She had an alto voice and could play piano, ‘ukulele, bass and guitar. Aluli wrote her first song in 1935, called "Three Lovely White Blossoms;" followed shortly by "Peke Nui" AKA "Down on Maunakea Street."

In 1937, she had her first hit, "Puamana," which was a song she wrote about her childhood home in Lahaina. "Puamana" has become a standard for hula dancers and Hawaiian musicians.

In the 1960s, she started a group called Puamana. The group started out as a trio (Irmgard, her sister Diana and close friend and Annie Kerr alum, Thelma Anahū). In 1976, Irmgard amended the group to include her daughters Neaulani Aluli Spaulding and Mihana Aluli Souza. After Neaulani's death Aluli added her niece, Luanna Farden McKenney, and her daughter Aima McManus, to the group. A short film was created by Les Blank, Meleanna Meyer and Chris Simon about Puamana in 1991. The film features the group and also includes interviews with Aluli.

Aluli performed publicly often until she hurt her hand in 1998. In 1998, she was honored with an induction into the Hawaiian Music Hall of Fame. She continued to play ʻukulele and made "occasional appearances until a few weeks before her death." Aluli died on October 4, 2001, in Honolulu.

In 2015, Puamana, which has continued under the leadership of her daughters and granddaughter earned a Lifetime Achievement Award from HARA.
