= Mitsuo Aoki =

American theologian (1914–2010)

- Born: December 4, 1914; Hawi, Hawaii
- Died: August 19, 2010 (aged 95); Honolulu, Hawaii
- Occupation: Theologian

Mitsuo Aoki (December 4, 1914 – August 19, 2010), nicknamed Mits, was an American theologian. He was born on a sugar-cane plantation near Hawi on the Island of Hawaii, and lived there until graduating high school. He then relocated to Honolulu for University training, and converted to Christianity from Buddhism. He studied at the Chicago Theological Seminary and the Union Theological Seminary. At the beginning of World War II, Aoki was living in the mainland US, and was subsequently escorted by FBI agents to Hawaii, rather than placed into Japanese American internment camps as were mainland persons of Japanese Ancestry.

Aoki founded the Department of Religion at the University of Hawaiʻi at Mānoa campus, and regularly taught courses such as Religions of Mankind, Death and Dying and The Meaning of Existence for forty years thereafter.He frequently recounted an out of body experience he'd had following an automobile accident in 1957 as a driving force in his life. In 1968 he met and soon married Margaret Evelyn Reeves Wagner, a divorcee who recently relocated to Hawaii from California. He had three children by his first wife, and his second wife (Lynne Aoki) had 5 children by her first husband. They had no children together.

In his later years, Aoki often gave seminars on death and dying, relaying his many experiences in counseling families of those losing a loved one, whom he considered his teachers. He is acknowledged as a world leader on the subject of death and dying.

In 2004 Aoki was named as a Living Treasures of Hawai'i.

Aoki died on August 19, 2010.

Among those crediting him with their success is the 2011-2015 Governor of Hawaii, Neil Abercrombie, who in his election victory speech of November 3, 2010 made specific mention of Aoki's positive influence on his life's work, thanking him for his service to Hawaii and stating inter alia: "He blessed us with his presence."

The Mits Aoki Legacy Foundation was established by former students of his, and have published his works for public access. Much of his work is also accessible at the Manoa Library where they are also housed. Much of the work are videos of him while serving as a 'guru' for the Young Presidents' Organization for many years, wherein he was given the nickname of "cosmic dancer".
