= Mitsuo Sanami =

Japanese sport shooter

Personal information
- Born: 7 March 1937 (age 89)

Sport
- Sport: Sports shooting

Mitsuo Sanami (佐波 光男, Sanami Mitsuo; born 7 March 1937) is a Japanese sport shooter who competed in the 1964 Summer Olympics.
