= Charles W. Kenn =

Hawaiian cultural historian (1907–1988)

- Born: January 2, 1907; Honolulu
- Died: June 10, 1988 (aged 81); Kāneʻohe

Charles William Kenn (January 2, 1907 – June 10, 1988) was a Hawaiian historian and cultural expert. Kenn was one of the last living practitioners of lua, a Hawaiian martial art, before he shared what he knew with a select group of students to continue the sacred tradition. In his scholarly writings, he resisted cultural assimilation of Hawaiians into American culture and defended the cultural practices of Native Hawaiians.

== Early life, education, and career ==
Charles William Kenn was born in Honolulu on January 2, 1907. Kenn was descended from a line of kāhuna. His ethnic background was Hawaiian, Japanese, and German. Kenn graduated from President William McKinley High School, Hawaii's first public high school. He went on to complete graduate and postgraduate work at the University of Hawaiʻi.

Kenn held a number of jobs, including work early in his adult life as a teacher at Central Union Church in Honolulu and on the Big Island. He served as the Director of Hawaiian Activities for the Honolulu Recreation Commission. He also worked as the cultural specialist for Waimea Falls Park for many years.

== Scholarship ==
In his writings, Kenn argued passionately for defiance against the Americanization of the Hawaiian people. He shared his skepticism of the benevolence of American education and critiqued assimilationist policies that demonstrated contempt for Hawaiian cultural practices. In a 1936 article, he wrote:

The white fathers from the land of the free decided my people should go to school. Hadn't they always been to school? Were not the great out of doors their books, wherein they learned the things they needed to know the most? Superimposition and education were brought about without regard for the elements in my peoples' culture that were worth saving. I am still a Hawaiian and I am proud of it. I am no different from you.

Kenn recorded Hawaiian chants from elders, preserving information about the Hawaiian language and cultural traditions. Many of his recordings became part of the collections of the Bishop Museum. In 1935 Kenn staged an exhibition of hula and traditional sports at the University of Hawaiʻi at Mānoa; the film from this event became part of the Bishop Museum's 1984 film Ka Po'e Hula Hawai'i Kahiko, The Hula People of Old Hawai'i.

He wrote about the pronunciation of the word "Hawaii" in 1944, consulting with Polynesian and linguistic experts as well as relying on his own recordings of elder Hawaiians speaking and chanting, determining that "Haw-vah-eʻe" was historically accurate. In 1949 he wrote a short book titled Fire-walking from the inside : a report on four fire-walking performances in Honolulu, and a critical study of them from the point of view of the initiate fire-walker instead of that of the onlooker, discussing the prayers and rituals involved in firewalking.

== Knowledge and teaching of lua ==
By the 1970s, Kenn was one of the last living masters of lua, a sacred martial art practiced by skilled warriors. As a young man, he had learned lua from several teachers, including two who had trained at a royal lua school established by King Kalakaua. He had also studied with sensei Seishiro Okazaki.

When he was approached by men who wanted to learn the ancient tradition, Kenn initially refused, but eventually agreed to teach a core group of students. After four years of training he graduated a group of five ‘olohe (masters), who have continued teaching select students. Kenn's efforts led to the establishment of two lua pa (schools) in Hawaii: Pa Ku‘i-a-Lua and Ku‘i-a-Holo.

== Death and legacy ==
Kenn died at his home in Kaneohe on June 10, 1988.

In 1976 Kenn was the first honoree in the Living Treasures of Hawaii program of the Buddhist Honpa Hongwanji Mission of Hawaii. A concert was held in 1984 honoring the recipients of the Na Makua Mahalo Ia Award, recognizing their contributions to the Hawaiian Renaissance of the 1970s. "Uncle Charles" was one of the kūpuna (elders) celebrated for his work as a historian, ethnologist, lecturer, translator, social worker, and poet. The 1984 Ka Makahiki a Paani, an event dedicated to traditional Hawaiian sports and games, was dedicated to Kenn in recognition of his efforts in preserving and reviving those sports and games as well as the Makahiki celebration.

In 2006, four of Kenn's students published Lua: Art of the Hawaiian Warrior, describing the history and philosophy of lua, while continuing to keep the sacred aspects of the artform hidden.
