= Nola Nahulu =

Nola A. Nahulu
- Born: November 3, 1954 (age 71); Makaha, Oʻahu, Hawaii, U.S.
- Occupations: Choral conductor, educator
- Employer(s): University of Hawaiʻi at Mānoa; Hawaiʻi Youth Opera Chorus
- Known for: Artistic Director of HYOC; promoting Hawaiian choral music

Nola Ann Nāhulu (born November 3, 1954) is an American choral conductor. She is the artistic director of the Hawaii Youth Opera Chorus (HYOC), as well as the Kawaiahaʻo Church Choir, Kawaiolaonāpukanileo, an a cappella Hawaiian choral ensemble, and others. She is also a teacher and lecturer at University of Hawaiʻi at Mānoa. Additionally, she runs Bette Muʻumuʻu, a dress manufacturer in Hawaiʻi. Nāhulu is a graduate of Kamehameha Schools.

== Career ==
Nāhulu studied at Whitman College and the University of Hawaii at Manoa, receiving a master's degree in music education. She has served as the executive director for HYOC since 1986. With HYOC, Nahulu has directed many festivals in Hawaiʻi, such as the Na Leo Pili Mai Choral Festival and E Mele Kākou Children's Choral Festival. She also participates in the annual Pacific Rim Children's Chorus Festival every summer, and assists with the Hawaiian pieces, considered a staple of the festival.
