= List of people from Honolulu =

This is a list of notable past and present residents of the U.S. city of Honolulu, Hawaii, and its surrounding metropolitan area.

== Arts ==
- Satoru Abe (1926–2025), sculptor and painter
- Bernice Akamine (1949–2024), Native Hawaiian traditional artist, glass artist, visual artist, and Hawaiian rights activist
- Marguerite Blasingame (1906–1947), sculptor and painter; born in Honolulu
- Jean Charlot (1898–1979), French-American painter, muralist, and illustrator
- Isami Doi (1903–1965), printmaker and painter; lived in Honolulu in the 1920s and 1930s
- Johanna Drew Cluney (1895–1978), Hawaiian feather lei maker, featherworker, collector, conservator
- Mary Louise Kekuewa (1926–2008), Hawaiian feather lei maker, featherworker
- Arman Manookian (1904–1931), Ottoman Empire-born Armenian and American painter
- Coyote Park (born 1999), Spanish-born American photographer raised in Honolulu, known for their queer and trans portrait photography
- Shirley Russell (1886–1985), painter, known for paintings of Hawaii and flowers
- Tadashi Sato (1923–2005), painter, known for Aquarius, a 36-foot circular mosaic on the floor of the atrium of the Hawaii State Capitol
- Madge Tennent (1889–1972), British-American painter considered the most important contributor to 20th-century Hawaiian art
- Dallas Nagata White (born 1987), landscape photographer known for "lava kiss"
- Jeff Widener (born 1956), photojournalist
- John Chin Young (1909–1997), painter known for his Zen-like depictions of horses

== Athletics ==
- Robyn Ah Mow-Santos, Olympic silver medalist volleyball player and coach
- Dennis Alexio, kickboxer
- David Amerson, football player, North Carolina State and Washington Redskins cornerback
- Francys Arsentiev, first U.S. woman to reach the summit of Mount Everest without the aid of bottled oxygen
- David Aupiu, football player
- Dino Babers, head football coach for the Syracuse Orange
- Noahkai Banks, soccer player
- Tim Bartro, indoor/outdoor soccer player
- Heather Bown, Olympic silver medalist volleyball player
- Alexander Cartwright, "father of baseball"
- Byron Chamberlain, NFL player
- Bryan Clay, 2008 Olympic gold medalist for the decathlon
- Jeff Cobb, Olympian and ROH wrestler
- Buster Crabbe, 1932 Olympic gold medalist and actor (Tarzan, Flash Gordon, and Buck Rogers)
- Ron Darling, MLB pitcher, broadcaster
- Kaʻimi Fairbairn, American football player
- Sid Fernandez, MLB pitcher
- Chris Fuamatu-Maʻafala, NFL player
- Kurt Gouveia, NFL player
- Max Holloway, former UFC Featherweight Champion
- Charlie Hough, MLB pitcher
- Mike Huff, MLB pitcher
- Nia Jax, WWE wrestler
- Duke Kahanamoku, Olympic gold medalist, surfer, actor
- Olin Kreutz, NFL player
- Ashley Lelie, NFL player
- Karl Lorch, NFL player
- Mike Lum, MLB player
- Salvador "Dado" Marino (1915–1989), flyweight boxer who became World flyweight champion in 1950
- Marcus Mariota, NFL player
- Carissa Moore, professional surfer
- Leon Morimoto, soccer player who represented the Guam national team
- Ken Niumatalolo, football coach
- Kenso Nushida (1899–1983), baseball player
- Ed Parker, martial artist, author
- B.J. Penn, UFC lightweight and welterweight champion
- Dominic Raiola, NFL player
- Nick Rolovich, college football coach
- Kyla Ross, Olympic gold medalist gymnast and member of the Fierce Five
- Lenn Sakata, MLB player
- Teee Sanders, Olympic bronze medalist volleyball player
- Dave Shoji, since 2013, all-time winningest NCAA Division I head volleyball coach
- John Simerson, football player
- Andi Sullivan, soccer player for the United States
- Thomas Tamas, sport shooter
- Manti Teʻo, football player for Notre Dame and San Diego Chargers
- Tua Tagovailoa, NFL player, Miami Dolphins
- Shane Victorino, MLB World Series champion (2008 Philadelphia Phillies, 2013 Boston Red Sox)
- Michelle Wie, professional golfer
- Milt Wilcox, MLB pitcher
- Jerome Williams, MLB pitcher
- Kim Willoughby, Olympic silver medalist volleyball player
- Bobby Wood, MLS soccer player

== Business ==
- Thomas O. Bales Jr., medical technology and aerospace inventor and entrepreneur
- Charles Reed Bishop, businessman, philanthropist, founder of the Bishop Museum
- James Dole, developer of the pineapple industry in Hawaii, namesake of the Dole Food Company
- Maria J. Forbes, manager, Lunalilo Home
- Genshiro Kawamoto, billionaire real estate investor
- Stanley Kennedy Sr. founder of Hawaiian Airlines
- Darren Kimura, businessman, founder of Sopogy
- Pierre Omidyar, eBay creator and founder
- William S. Patout, III, sugar grower from Iberia Parish, Louisiana; lived in Honolulu 1959–1960

== Literature ==
- Joseph Campbell, writer, lecturer
- Charles Lindbergh, author
- Jack London, author, journalist, and social activist
- Jack Lord, actor
- Lois Lowry, author
- Herman Melville, author
- James A. Michener, Pulitzer Prize-winning novelist
- Janet Mock, author and MSNBC talk show host
- Tom Selleck, actor
- Robert Louis Stevenson, novelist, poet, essayist and travel writer
- Hunter S. Thompson, journalist and author
- Mark Twain, author
- Kirby Wright, poet and writer
- Norman Wong, writer

== Entertainers, actors, models ==
- Keiko Agena, actress
- Judi Andersen, Miss Hawaii USA 1978, Miss USA 1978
- Kermet Apio, comedian
- Jacob Batalon, actor
- Darin Brooks, actor
- Angelique Cabral, actress
- Sarah Wayne Callies, actress
- Tia Carrere, singer, actress
- Kam Fong Chun, actor, Hawaii Five-O
- Mark Dacascos, actor, martial artist
- Denise Dowse, actress and director, Beverly Hills, 90210
- Maile Flanagan, actress, comedian
- David Gallaher, graphic novelist and comic book author
- Nick Gomez, actor
- Lauren Graham, actress and producer, Gilmore Girls
- Erin Gray, actress, Silver Spoons
- John Halliday, actor
- Ann Harada, actress
- Kelly Hu, actress, Miss Hawaii Teen USA 1985, Miss Teen USA 1985
- Carrie Ann Inaba, television judge, Dancing with the Stars
- Dwayne Johnson, actor, wrestler, alumnus of President William McKinley High School
- Keahu Kahuanui, actor, plays Danny Mahealani in series Teen Wolf on MTV
- Nicole Kidman, Academy Award-winning actress
- Daniel Dae Kim, actor
- Randall Duk Kim, actor, Kung Fu Panda
- Clyde Kusatsu, actor
- Brook Lee, Miss Hawaii USA 1997, Miss USA 1997, Miss Universe 1997
- Titus Makin Jr., actor, singer, dancer
- Markiplier, real name Mark Fischbach, YouTuber
- Bruno Mars, actor, singer-songwriter
- Lori Matsukawa, television news anchor
- Julie McCullough, comedian
- Al Michaels, television sportscaster
- Jason Momoa, actor, director, model
- Jack Mower, actor
- Tahj Mowry, actor
- Jim Nabors, actor, singer, The Andy Griffith Show, Gomer Pyle, U.S.M.C.
- Timothy Olyphant, actor, Deadwood, Justified
- Maggi Parker, actress, Hawaii Five-O
- Janel Parrish, actress, model, plays Mona in Pretty Little Liars
- Katija Pevec, actress
- Kelly Preston, actress, model
- Maggie Q, actress, model, Nikita
- Tanoai Reed, stuntman, actor
- Anthony Ruivivar, actor
- Hironobu Sakaguchi, video game director, writer and producer
- Amanda Schull, actress
- James Shigeta, actor
- Shannyn Sossamon, actress
- Karen Steele, actress
- Don Stroud, actor
- Mageina Tovah, actress
- Macel Wilson, Miss Hawaii USA 1962, Miss USA 1962
- Tanya Wilson, Miss Hawaii USA 1972, Miss USA 1972
- Taylor Wily, actor, Hawaii Five-O
- Keone Young, voice and actor

== Music ==
- Anjani, singer-songwriter and pianist
- Chris Barron, lead singer of Spin Doctors
- Yvonne Elliman, popular singer
- Don Ho, popular singer
- HueningKai, Korean-American singer in boy band TXT
- Melody, singer
- Jack Johnson, musician
- Israel Kamakawiwoʻole, Hawaiian musician
- Titus Makin Jr., actor, singer, dancer
- Bruno Mars, actor and singer-songwriter
- Glenn Medeiros, singer-songwriter
- James Mercer, frontman of rock band The Shins
- Bette Midler, singer and actress
- Kid Ory, jazz musician and bandleader
- Michael Paulo, saxophonist
- Nicole Scherzinger, singer, dancer, model
- Jake Shimabukuro, ukulele virtuoso
- Hana Shimozumi, light opera singer
- Shing02, rapper
- Mike Starr (1966–2011), musician, best known as the bassist for Alice in Chains 1987–1993; born in Honolulu
- Megan Skiendiel, singer of the girl band Katseye
- Donald Sur, composer and musicologist

== Politics ==
- Neil Abercrombie, governor of Hawaii, 2010–2014
- Daniel Akaka, U.S. senator, first Native Hawaiian senator in the United States
- George Ariyoshi, 3rd governor of Hawaii, the first Asian American governor in the United States
- John A. Burns, 2nd governor of Hawaii
- Ben Cayetano, governor of Hawaii 1994–2002
- Nora Stewart Coleman, former First Lady of American Samoa
- Sanford B. Dole, lawyer, jurist, president of the Republic of Hawaii, and 1st territorial governor of Hawaii
- Tammy Duckworth, United States senator from Illinois and former U.S. congresswoman representing the 8th Congressional district in Illinois
- Hiram Fong, United States senator, namesake of the Senator Fong's Plantation & Gardens in Kaneohe
- Mazie Hirono, U.S. senator from Hawai'i
- Daniel Inouye, Medal of Honor recipient, U.S. senator, president pro tempore
- Princess Kaʻiulani, crown princess, heir to the throne of the Kingdom of Hawaiʻi
- King Kalakaua, last reigning king of the Kingdom of Hawaiʻi
- Queen Liliuokalani, last reigning queen of the Hawaiian Islands
- Oren E. Long, former territorial governor of Hawai'i, one of Hawai'i's first US senators
- King Lunalilo, king of the Kingdom of Hawaii
- Bongbong Marcos, 17th president of the Philippines
- Ferdinand Marcos, 10th president of the Philippines
- Imee Marcos, senator of the Philippines
- Patsy Mink, former U.S. congresswoman who co-authored the Title IX Amendment of the Higher Education Act, first Japanese-American woman licensed to practice law in Hawaii
- Barack Obama, 44th president of the United States
- Sarah Palin, politician, 2008 Republican vice-presidential candidate
- Syngman Rhee, 1st president of South Korea
- Brian Schatz, U.S. senator from Hawai'i
- Mark Takai, former U.S. representative
- Lorrin A. Thurston, lawyer, politician in Honolulu early 1900s
- Sun Yat-sen, "father of the nation" of the Republic of China, and the "forerunner of democratic revolution" in the People's Republic of China

== Missionaries ==
- Angeles Mangaser Avecilla (1902–1975), Filipino social worker, missionary, and educator in the Territory of Hawaii
- Abigail Willis Tenney Smith, missionary; teacher; president of the Woman's Board of Missions for the Pacific Islands

== Miscellaneous ==
- Dorothea Bennett (1929–1990), geneticist
- Bernice Pauahi Bishop, Hawaiian princess, philanthropist, aliʻi, and Kamehameha descendant
- Elizabeth Carter Bogardus (1895–1928), socialite, community leader, and the founder of the Junior League of Honolulu
- Redmond Burke, heart surgeon
- Mary Catton, social worker
- Louise Olga Gaylord Dillingham (1885–1964), socialite, civic leader
- Doris Duke, heiress, socialite, horticulturalist, art collector, and philanthropist
- Ann Dunham, mother of Barack Obama
- Amelia Earhart, aviation pioneer and author
- Charles Irving Elliott, aviation pioneer
- Mary Jane Kekulani Fayerweather (1842–1930), high chiefess, teacher, music composer, and dairy farmer
- Katrina Forest, microbiologist and structural biology pioneer
- Willowdean Chatterson Handy, anthropologist of Hawaiian studies, writer
- Willi Hennig, biologist
- Marcus "Dyrus" Hill, League of Legends professional player
- Stella Maude Jones, archivist, historian, and librarian
- George E. Martin, US Army major general, lived in Honolulu during retirement
- Megan McClung, first female United States Marine Corps officer killed in combat during the Iraq War
- Elizabeth Peet McIntosh, OSS agent in WWII
- May A. Moir (1907–2001), floral designer, writer, gardener
- William Whitmore Goodale Moir (1896–1985), botanist and agricultural technologist
- Harry T.L. Pang, posthumous Purple Heart recipient killed during the surprise attack on Pearl Harbor while serving with the Honolulu Fire Department
- James Mahmud Rice, sociologist
- David Schutter, attorney and activist
- Winfield W. Scott Jr., United States Army lieutenant general
- Charles L. Veach, astronaut
- Ehren Watada, United States Army lieutenant who refused to deploy to Iraq
- Danny Yamashiro, clergyman, researcher, and religious broadcaster
- Dora Chung Zane, social worker
