= Mary Paul Janchill =

Social services practitioner

Sister Mary Paul Janchill (1920–2009) "wrote one of the three seminal articles introducing general systems theory to social work practitioners in the late 1960s."

Janchill joined Sisters of the Good Shepherd in 1945. In 1953, she graduated from St. John's University (New York City) followed by a Master of Social Work from Catholic University of America in 1955 and a doctorate from the Columbia University School of Social Work in 1968.

With Sister Mary Geraldine Tobia, she founded the Center for Family Life in Sunset Park, Brooklyn. The agency was the cover story in Time on December 30, 1985.

Ronald Reagan presented her with the White House Award. Janchill was inducted into the Columbia University School of Social Work Hall of Fame.
