= Kamaka =

Kamaka may refer to:

- Kamaka (island), a small island in French Polynesia
- Kamaka Ukulele
- Kamakã people, an Indigenous people in Brazil and subgroup of the Pataxó-hã-hã-hãe
- Kamakã language, an extinct language of Brazil
- Kamakã languages, a small family of extinct Macro-Jê languages of Bahía near Brazil's Atlantic coast
- Kamaka, a former gold town and railway station in New Zealand

== People ==
- Kai Kamaka III, American mixed martial artist
- Kamakaimoku, Hawaiian chiefess in early 18th century
- Kamaka Hepa, American college basketball player
- Kamaka Kūkona, American musician
- Kamaka Stillman, Hawaiian noble
- McRonald Kamaka, also known as "King Kamaka", a professional wrestler with the ring name "Tor Kamata"
