= Sister Mary Geraldine Tobia =

Sister Mary Geraldine Tobia (died April 25, 2000 Manhattan) was a social worker who served as co-director of the Center for Family Life in Sunset Park, Brooklyn. She lived at the center. When she was 59, Tobia died of cancer at Mount Sinai Hospital (Manhattan).

== Biography ==
She was born and raised in Newark, New Jersey. Her undergraduate degree was from Fordham University in 1967 and she earned two master's degrees from Columbia. The first was in 1976 from Teachers College, Columbia University and in 1995 from Columbia University School of Social Work.

== Career ==
Tobia founded the Center for Family Life in 1978 with Sister Mary Paul Janchill. The agency was the cover story in Time (magazine) on December 30, 1985.

== Honors and awards ==
In 1978, she received the Ecumenical woman of the Year award from the Brooklyn Division of the Council of Churches of the City of New York.

Tobia was inducted into the Columbia University School of Social Work Hall of Fame.
