= Clorinda Low Lucas =

Hawaiian social worker (1895–1986)

- Born: Elizabeth Jessemine Kauikeolani Low; August 9, 1895; Honolulu, Republic of Hawaii (now United States)
- Died: February 24, 1986 (aged 90); Niu Valley, Honolulu, O'ahu, Hawaii, United States
- Burial place: Kawaiahaʻo Church
- Other name: Elizabeth Low Lucas
- Education: Smith College (BA), New York School of Social Work (MA)
- Occupation: Social worker
- Known for: Pioneering social work in Hawaii
- Spouse: Charles "Charlie" Williams Lucas (married 1924–1965; his death)
- Children: 1
- Relatives: Sanford B. Dole (hānai grandfather), Myron "Pinky" Thompson (son in-law), Nainoa Thompson (grandson)

Clorinda Low Lucas (née Elizabeth Jessemine Kauikeolani Low; August 9, 1895 – February 24, 1986) was an American Native Hawaiian social worker. She was one of the earliest trained social workers in Hawaii, and served in social work leadership positions on the islands, including as the chief of the social work division of the social security department at the department of social welfare, and as the director of the "School of Social Work Service" for the department of public instruction for the State of Hawaii.

== Early life, education, and family ==
Elizabeth Jessemine Kauikeolani Low was born on August 9, 1895, in Honolulu, Republic of Hawaii, she was partially Native Hawaiian. Her parents were Elizabeth "Lizzie" Pu‘uki (née Napoli, later changed to Napoleon) and Ebenezer "Rawhide Ben" Kahekawaipunaokauaamaluih Parker Low. Her father Ebenezer was a cowboy, and politician; and he was a direct descendant of the John Palmer Parker family, and of King Kamehameha I. Her mother Lizzie was of mixed racial heritage and was a hānai (informally adopted) child to judge Sanford B. Dole and his wife. Elizabeth Low was nicknamed "Clorinda" when she was a child. Lucas was raised during a time period when being Native Hawaiian was regarded by the Christian missionaries as "pagan", and with her mother being raised as a haole; Lucas was never taught the Hawaiian language in childhood. She appeared to have internal conflict on her cultural identity. Lucas attended the Punahou School from 1901 to 1913, and graduated.

Lucas received a BA degree in English 1917, from Smith College in Northampton, Massachusetts; followed by a MA degree in 1937 from the New York School of Social Work (now Columbia University School of Social Work) in New York City.

She and Charles "Charlie" Williams Lucas, a Niu Valley dairy rancher, were married on July 19, 1924. Together they had one daughter Laura Kalaukapu Low Lucas, who married noted social worker Myron "Pinky" Thompson in 1949.

== Career ==
While in high school, Lucas volunteered with the organization Hui Pauahi, and she spent time with underserved youth in the then-impoverished Kakaʻako neighborhood of O'ahu.

In 1919, Lucas moved to New York City and worked at the Young Women’s Christian Association (now YWCA US), where she helped foreign-born women for one year. She moved back to Hawaii in 1920 for marriage, and to work at the private Hawaiian Humane Society, which at the time helped abused and neglected animals and children. From this work experience at the Humane Society, she felt that another public agency could better serve the children, because the private agency Humane Society was overburdened by the number child abuse cases, and cases of children born out of wedlock. She remained at the Human Society until 1935. During the Great Depression there was a movement to focus more on child welfare services. In 1935, the Child Welfare League of America recommended that the Hawaiian Humane Society transfer its child welfare cases to the Children’s Service Association, which was newly established and funded by the United Way; and Lucas resigned her position the same year.

Her mentor Margaret Mary Louise Catton suggested she return to school for social work. During her masters degree education it was still the Great Depression and the United States started many new social welfare programs, include the founding of the Social Security Administration. Lucas was the first Hawaiian woman to receive a professional training in social work, when she graduated from her master's degree in 1937. She joined the Hawaii Territorial Department of Public Welfare the same year as graduating, serving as the city and county director of public welfare for Honolulu County.

During 1939, the economy in Hawaii took a downturn with the two leading industries of the time, the sugar and pineapple production, which employed more than 40% of the workforce on plantations on the islands, and they had declined in business. This caused escalating inflation and, food insecurity in Hawaii. By 1940, the United States Armed Forces brought their personnel to O'ahu in response to World War II, which further increased the demand for housing and food supplies on the islands. After seeing the increase in child neglect and poverty intensifying during this time, Lucas became more interested in social reform and organization as a way to further help her social work. In 1940, Lucas became “chief of the social work division of the social security department” in the Department of Public Welfare, succeeding Johnny Wilson, who did not have a formal education in social work.

The newly formed Hawaii division of pupil guidance, had selected Lucas in 1943 to lead the department, and to launch the first school social work program in Hawaii. One criticism was Lucas had been her deemphasis the importance of Hawaiian culture as part of her advocacy for island children, because of her own upbringing she had celebrated Americanization of the island. She retired in July 1960.

In 1979, Low was named one of the Living Treasures of Hawaii by the Honpa Hongwanji Mission of Hawaii.

== Death and legacy ==
Lucas died at the age of 90 in her home Niu Valley neighborhood of Honolulu, on February 24, 1986. Her papers are held at the Hawaii State Archives.
