= Ethel James Williams =

American civil servant

Ethel James Williams was a leader in the Washington, DC social services and government for more than fifty years. Williams was research director of the city council and executive director of the D.C. Commission for Women.

== Biography ==
A Philadelphia native, Williams graduated from Temple University and the Columbia University School of Social Work (class of 1949). In 2001, ahe was inducted into their Hall of Fame. She moved to Washington, DC in 1950 and served as executive director of the Southeast Neighborhood House for nine years. In the 1960s, she became assistant director of the D.C. Commissioners' Council on Human Relations and associate professor at the Howard University School of Social Work.

Williams became the research director of the Washington DC City Council in 1968.

She was also the first executive director of the National Association of Commissions for Women (NACW) and inducted into their National Women's Hall of Fame.

Williams died on April 21, 2003, in Wheaton, Maryland.
