= Melissa Begg =

American population health statistician and academic administrator

Melissa D. Begg is the dean of the Columbia School of Social Work, in Columbia University, and a professor of social work and of biostatistics at Columbia. Her research expertise concerns the biostatistics of population health, including the use of correlated data from family studies.

== Education and career ==
Begg is originally from Queens, New York. She majored in mathematics at Fairfield University, and has a Ph.D. in biostatistics from the Harvard T.H. Chan School of Public Health, completed in 1989.

She has worked as a faculty member at Columbia University since 1989, for many years as part of the Columbia University Mailman School of Public Health. From 2006 to 2018, she co-directed Columbia's Irving Institute for Clinical and Translational Research. She became Vice Provost for Academic Programs in 2014, and dean of the Columbia School of Social Work in 2019.

== Recognition ==
Begg was elected as a Fellow of the American Statistical Association in 2012. Also in 2012, she became the inaugural recipient of the Lagakos Distinguished Alumni Award of the Harvard School of Public Health’s Department of Biostatistics.

She was the 2013 recipient of the Association of Schools and Programs of Public Health / Pfizer Award for Teaching Excellence.
