= Nainoa Thompson =

American Native Hawaiian navigator (b. 1953)

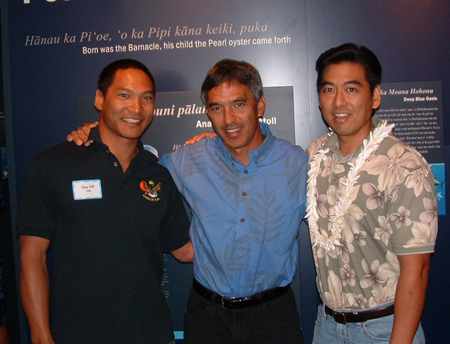
- Nainoa Thompson (center) with actor Jason Scott Lee (left) and artist Layne Luna (right). Photo taken in 2003 at Hilo, Hawaiʻi.
- Born: Charles Nainoa Thompson; March 11, 1953 (age 73); Honolulu, Hawaii, United States
- Education: University of Hawaiʻi (BA)
- Occupation: Ship navigator in the Polynesian traditions
- Spouse: Kathy Muneno
- Children: 2
- Father: Myron "Pinky" Thompson
- Relatives: Clorinda Low Lucas (maternal grandmother)

Charles Nainoa Thompson (born March 11, 1953) is an American navigator and the president of the Polynesian Voyaging Society. He is the first native Hawaiian to practice traditional Polynesian navigational methods since the 14th century, having crewed two double-hulled canoes (the Hōkūleʻa and the Hawaiʻiloa) across the Polynesian islands without the aid of Western instruments.

== Early life and career ==
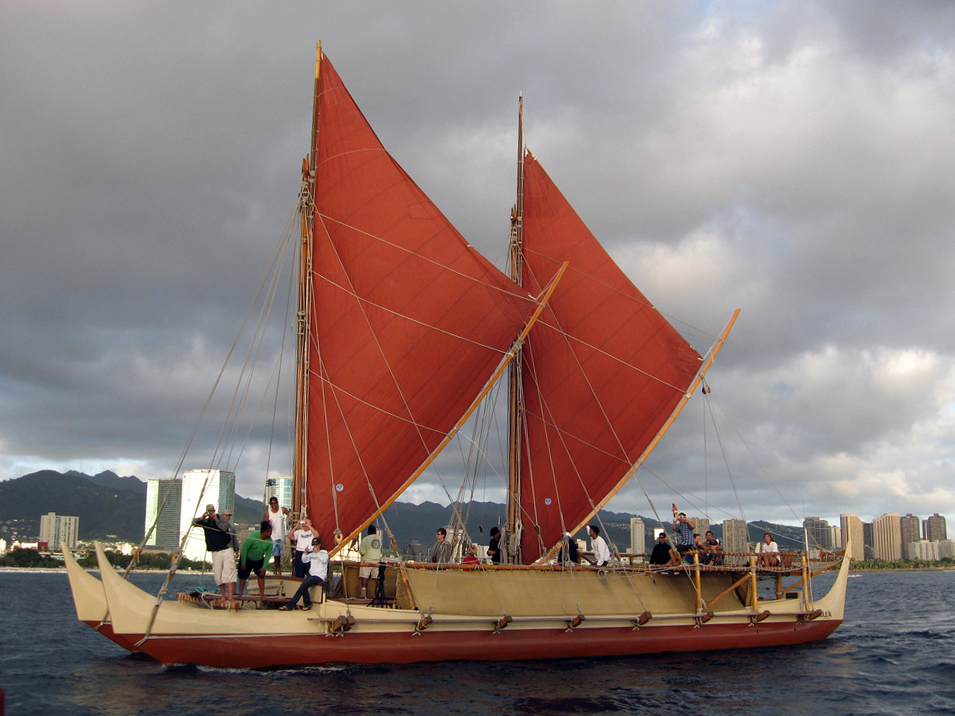
Hōkūleʻa sailing off Honolulu, 2009

Charles Nainoa Thompson was born on March 11, 1953, in Honolulu, Hawaii. His mother was Laura Kalaukapu Low Lucas (daughter of Clorinda Low Lucas), and his father was Myron "Pinky" Thompson. Thompson is a direct descendant of Alexander Adams and James Harbottle, foreign advisors of the Kingdom of Hawai'i, rancher John Palmer Parker, and King Kamehameha I; his Hawaiian lineage was also be further traced back to voyagers from Mataiea in the southern coast of Tahiti. He graduated from Punahou School in 1972.

Thompson earned a BA degree in ocean science in 1986 from the University of Hawaiʻi. Thompson was trained by master navigator Mau Piailug from the island of Satawal and Bishop Museum Planetarium lecturer Will Kyselka.

His first solo voyage was from Hawaiʻi to Tahiti in 1980. Since then, Thompson has been the lead navigator on the subsequent voyages of Hōkūleʻa, including the Voyage of Rediscovery from 1985 to 1987.

On March 18, 2007, Thompson and four other Native Hawaiian navigators were inducted into Pwo as master navigators. The ceremony was conducted by Piailug on Satawal.

In June 2014 he was made a commander of the Order of Tahiti Nui for his work with the Polynesian Voyaging Society. Between 2014 and 2017 as part of the Mālama Honua Worldwide Voyage, Thompson sailed the Hōkūleʻa and the Hawaiʻiloa to thirteen UNESCO World Heritage marine sites to showcase and teach traditional navigational practices

Thompson serves as the chair of the Board of Trustees for Kamehameha Schools (a post that his father Myron "Pinky" Thompson also held), and a member of the Board of Regents for the University of Hawaiʻi.

== Family and personal life ==
Thompson is married to KHON-TV2 television anchor Kathy Muneno. They are the parents of twins.

The success of the Hōkūleʻa's leg trip from Rarotonga landing at Waitangi on 5 December 1985 has earned him honorary membership with other crew of the canoe among the Te Tai Tokerau Māori as part of a sixth iwi named the Ngāti Ruawāhia (lit. "Tribe of the Arcturus") inducted by James Hēnare.
