= Johanna Drew Cluney =

American Hawaiian featherworker (1895–1978)

- Born: Johanna Keaioana Drew; October 6, 1895; Honolulu, O'ahu, Republic of Hawaii (now Hawaii, United States)
- Died: February 19, 1978 (aged 82); Honolulu, O'ahu, Hawaii, United States
- Burial place: Nuuanu Memorial Park, Honolulu, O'ahu, Hawaii, United States
- Other names: Johanna Drew–Cluney, Johanna Keaioana Drew Cluney
- Occupation(s): Cultural artisan, conservator, collector
- Known for: Lei hulu (feather lei), haku hulu (featherwork)
- Spouse: William Allen Cluney (m. 1914–1931; divorce)
- Children: 5
- Relatives: Kamaka Oukamakaokawaukeoiopiopio Stillman (maternal grandmother)
- Awards: Living Treasures of Hawaii (1977)

Johanna Keaioana Drew Cluney (née Johanna Keaioana Drew; 1895–1978) was an American Hawaiian featherwork artist, conservator, and collector of featherwork.

== Early life and family ==
Johanna Keaioana Drew was born on October 6, 1895, in Honolulu, Republic of Hawaii (now Hawaii, United States). Her parents were Keaupuiohiwa Katherine (née Stillman), and Levi J. Drew. Cluney's maternal grandfather was Henry Martyn Stillman (1822–1891), a banker from Boston who had married into the Hawaiian nobility, through his marriage to Kamaka Oukamakaokawaukeoiopiopio Stillman.

In 1914, she married William Allen Cluney (1889–1941). They had five children together, and divorced in 1931.

== Career ==
Cluney was technically a member of Hawaiian nobility through her ancestry, but Hawaiian politics were changing at the time of her birth, and with those changes, there was a loss of social power within her family. As a result she struggled financially in her early life, and became interested in the traditional Hawaiian featherwork as a spiritual source.

Her collection began when someone was throwing out a peacock feather lei, and she asked if she could keep it. Cluney started making feather lei in 1935. She learned how to make the feather leis from an older Hawaiian woman, and early on she would collect feathers at the butchers and learned to dye them. Cluney would stitch the feathers in place, and it would often take thousands of stitches. For many years she worked at the Bishop Museum, helping with the conservation of the Hawaiian Royal featherwork.

In 1966, Cluney was awarded the Hawaiiana Award by the Honolulu Chapter of the National Society of Arts and Letters, for her work in making feather leis. In 1977, she was awarded the Living Treasures of Hawaii award. She was a member of the Daughters of Hawaii, and was active in their events. A film was made in her honor, Hawaiian Featherwork With Johanna Drew Cluney (1970).

She died at the age of 82 on February 19, 1978, at Queen's Hospital in Honolulu; and was buried at Nuuanu Memorial Park. She left a collection from 1930 to 1978 to the Kamehameha Schools of handicrafts made in feathers, shells, seeds, lauhala, and manufactured hats, called the Johanna Drew Cluney Collection.

== See also ==
- Mary Louise Kekuewa
