= Myron "Pinky" Thompson =

American Hawaiian social worker, cultural leader (1924–2001)

- Born: Myron Bennett Thompson; February 29, 1924; Honolulu, Territory of Hawaii (now United States)
- Died: December 25, 2001 (aged 77); Honolulu, O’ahu, Hawaii, United States
- Other name: Pinky Thompson
- Occupations: Social worker, community leader, cultural leader
- Known for: Board of Trustees of Bishop Estate (now known as Kamehameha Schools)
- Spouse: Laura Kalaukapu Low Lucas (marriage 1949–)
- Children: 3, including Nainoa Thompson
- Relatives: Clorinda Low Lucas (mother in-law)

Myron Bennett "Pinky" Thompson (February 29, 1924 – December 25, 2001) was an American Hawaiian social worker, community leader and cultural leader among the Native Hawaiians. He is best known for his work as a member of the Board of Trustees of Bishop Estate (now known as Kamehameha Schools).

== Early life, family, and education ==
Myron Bennett "Pinky" Thompson was born on February 29, 1924, in Honolulu, Territory of Hawaii. Thompson graduated from Punahou School in 1943 and received a bachelor's degree in sociology from Colby College in 1950, and a master's degree in social work from the University of Hawaiʻi at Mānoa in 1952.

He married Laura Kalaukapu Low Lucas on February 21, 1949 in Augusta, Maine, she was the daughter of pioneering Hawaiian social worker Clorinda Low Lucas. Thompson is the father of master wayfinder Nainoa Thompson, who made several trans-Polynesian voyages as the navigator of the canoes Hokulea and Hawaiiloa. The younger Thompson leads the Polynesian Voyaging Society and sits on the Board of Trustees of Kamehameha Schools.

== Career ==
His community leadership posts include:

- Executive director of the Queen Liliʻuokalani Children's Center (1962–1967)
- State administrator under Gov. John A. Burns (1967–1970)
- Executive director of the Hawaiʻi State Department of Social Services & Housing (1970–1974)
- Trustee of Bishop Estate (1974–1994). In this capacity he developed early childhood programs, the cancellation of which in the late 1990s led to a controversy that sparked major changes in the trust.
- Co-founder of Alu Like and Papa Ola Lokahi, the Native Hawaiian health care system
- President of the Polynesian Voyaging Society (1979–2001)

He died after a battle with cancer on December 25, 2001, at Queen's Medical Center.
