= Hawaiian Humane Society =

Non-profit organisation in Hawaii, US

Coordinates: 21.290576°N 157.8180425°W

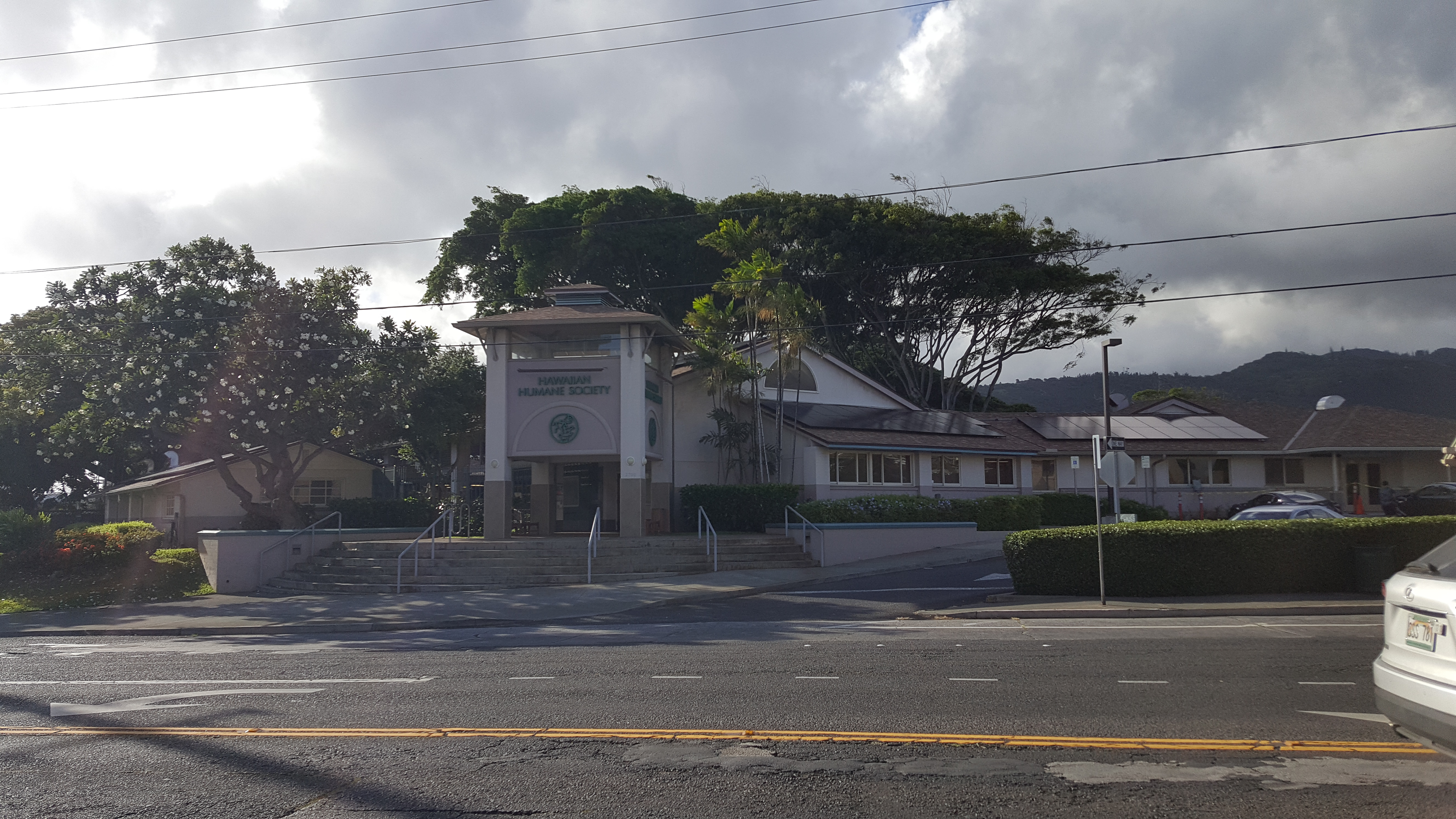
- Formation: 1883; 142 years ago
- Type: Nonprofit
- Purpose: Animal welfare
- Headquarters: Mōʻiliʻili, Honolulu, O'ahu, Hawaii, United States
- Leader: Anna Neubauer
- Website: www.hawaiianhumane.org

The Hawaiian Humane Society is a private nonprofit organization and open admission animal shelter in the Mōʻiliʻili neighborhood of Honolulu, Hawaii, U.S.. Its founding mission was to help animals, as well as at-risk children and unwed mothers; but in 1935 they changed their focused to work with only animals.

It has a staff of eighty five people who care for healthy animals and treat sick animals, investigate complaints, teach classes, and adopt out cats and dogs. They also have a large group volunteers.

== History ==
In 1883, three hundred and fifty concerned citizens organized the Hawaiian Humane Society, a local non-profit, with its first office on the Iolani Palace grounds in a cottage donated by King Kalākaua. Helen Wilder, daughter of American shipping magnate Samuel Gardner Wilder, was given the authority to enforce animal cruelty laws in 1897. At that time, she was the first female police officer of the Hawaiian Police Force and perhaps the world. She and her friends raised funds to hire Chang Apana to investigate animal crimes as their first humane investigator.

When the Hawaiian Humane Society was first established, it also served to protect unwed mothers, the mentally ill, and adopted out children. Clorinda Low Lucas worked in her early social work career from 1920 to 1935 at the Hawaiian Humane Society. In 1935 during the Great Depression, the Humane Society abdicated these child protection functions to public government agencies, such as the newly formed Child Protective Services.

In 1942, the organization moved to a building in Mōʻiliʻili. The facility expanded in 2016.

== Programs ==
The Hawaiian Humane Society's programs and services focus on strengthening the human-animal bond: rescuing the abused, engaging volunteers, fighting for better laws and caring for more than 20,000 animals a year. They are an open-admission shelter with over 30 programs and services that focus on unwanted prevention, spay and neutering, pet ID and responsible pet acquisition.
