= Kenso Nushida =

- Pitcher
- Born: November 28, 1899; Honolulu, Hawaii
- Died: May 1983 (aged 83–84)
- Batted: Unknown Threw: Right

Kenso Nushida (28 November 1899 – May 1983) was a baseball player born in Hawaii, the first Japanese American to play professional baseball in the United States. While "Hawaiians" had played in the Pacific Coast League for years, when Kenso Nushida debuted with the Sacramento Senators in 1932 he became the first person to play in that league while being identified as an Asian.

Nushida moved to California while a young man. He pitched in 11 games and created a stir in California's rich Asian baseball community. Towards the end of the season the Oakland Oaks signed Chinese-American pitcher Lee Gum Hong to face Nushida. There were claims that the Nushida-Lee matchup was designed to play off the intense feelings created by the Japanese invasion of China in the same year. Neither pitcher played in organized baseball after that year.
