= Mary Louise Kekuewa =

American Hawaiian featherworker (1926–2008)

- Born: Mary Louise Kaleonahenahe Wentworth Peck; February 5, 1926; Puʻunene, Maui, Hawaii, United States
- Died: July 18, 2008 (aged 82); Honolulu, O'ahu, Hawai'i, United States
- Other names: Aunty Mary Lou
- Occupation(s): Cultural artisan, teacher
- Known for: Lei hulu (feather lei), haku hulu (featherwork)
- Spouse: Paul Kalakoho Kekuewa (m. 1944–1994; his death)
- Children: 3
- Awards: Living Treasures of Hawaii (2003)

Mary Louise Kaleonahenahe Wentworth Peck Kekuewa (February 5, 1926 – July 18, 2008) was an American Hawaiian master of the ancient art of lei hulu (or feather lei) making and teacher. She is considered the "matriarch of the feather arts" according to the Honolulu Star-Advertiser. Kekuewa often worked in making feather leis alongside her daughter Paulette Kahalepuna (1945–2014); they co-authored a instructional book in 1976, and co-founded a school in Honolulu together in 1991. Kekuewa was nicknamed Aunty Mary Lou.

== Early life and family ==
Mary Louise Kaleonahenahe Wentworth Peck was born February 5, 1926, in Puʻunene, Maui. Her parents were Katherine Mailelani (née Rose), and Nohea Oramel Arnold Peck Sr.; her father was a civil engineer in the United States Army. During World War II, the family moved to San Francisco, California, where her father was stationed at the Presidio. After the war, her father moved to Japan alone, and was stationed there many years.

She and Paul Kalakoho Kekuewa married in 1944 in San Francisco, and together they had two daughters and one son.

== Career ==
In 1955, Kekuewa ran for Aloha Week Queen, and lost. After she started helping with the costumes for Aloha Week Queen, and learned featherworking from studying under Leilani O. Fernandez. Kekuewa started teaching feather lei making in the 1950s at the Bishop Museum in Honolulu. In 1975, Kekuewa was finally named the Aloha Week Queen. She was featured teaching feather lei making in 1976 on the PBS television series Pau Hana Years, with host Bob Barker.

Working alongside her daughter Paulette Kahalepuna (1945–2014) and Milly Singleary, they wrote and published the book, Feather Lei As An Art (1976). Their book was revised in 1990, with Karen A. Edlefsen. In 1991, Na Lima Mili Hulu Noeau (English: Skilled hands touch the feathers), a lei feather-making school and supply store in Honolulu was co-founded with her daughter Paulette Kahalepuna.

Many of their family has gotten involved with feather lei making, including Kekuewa's granddaughter Mele Kahalepuna (now Mele Kahalepuna Chun), and great granddaughter Taryn Wong. A generation of Hawaiian featherworkers have been influenced by her teachings, including Pattie H. Miyashiro, and Beverly Gwaltney.

In 2003, she award the title of Living Treasures of Hawaii.

Kekuewa died at the age of 82 on July 18, 2008, in Honolulu.

== Publications ==
- Kekuawa, Mary Louise; Kahalepuna, Paulette Nohealani; Singleary, Milly (1976). Feather Lei As An Art (1 ed.). Honolulu, Hawaii: Na Lima Mili Hulu No'eau.
- Kekuawa, Mary Louise; Kahalepuna, Paulette Nohealani; Edlefsen, Karen A. (1990). Feather Lei As An Art (revised ed.). Honolulu, Hawaii: Na Lima Mili Hulu No'eau.

== See also ==
- Johanna Drew Cluney
