= Dallas Nagata White =

- Born: January 15, 1987 (age 39); United States
- Occupation: Photographer

Dallas Nagata White is an American photographer from Honolulu, Hawaii. She is well known for her entry into the National Geographic Traveler contest in 2012 known as the "Lava kiss". White was also on popular photography website Nature TTL's 2014 list of top 10 landscape photographers to follow.

== WhiteTwedding2010 ==
White met her husband at a 2009 "Tweetup" for a local beer review podcast. Because of the involvement of Twitter in their meeting, White and her husband, Ed White, held a Tweetup during their wedding and invited Twitter followers to attend in person. The wedding happened during her husband's leave from a military deployment to Afghanistan.

== Lava kiss ==
The lava kiss photo was taken on the Kalapana, Hawaii. White and her husband were taking photos of the lava flow and decided to take photos of themselves. After focusing the camera and setting up exposure and aperture, White posed with her husband in front of a speedlite. White's only adjustments to the photo were for color contrast and sharpening. The photo was submitted to National Geographic's 2012 traveler photo contest where it received widespread media attention. The photo earned her a spot on the short list of favorites by The Atlantic and made Digital Journal's top-15 photos of 2012 list. Gizmodo described it as the "hottest kiss ever". The lava kiss was used as the featured photograph for an article covering the National Geographic Traveler contest in the October 2012 issue of Digital SLR Photography magazine.
