= Lei (garland) =

Flower garland popularized in the US via Hawaiian tourism

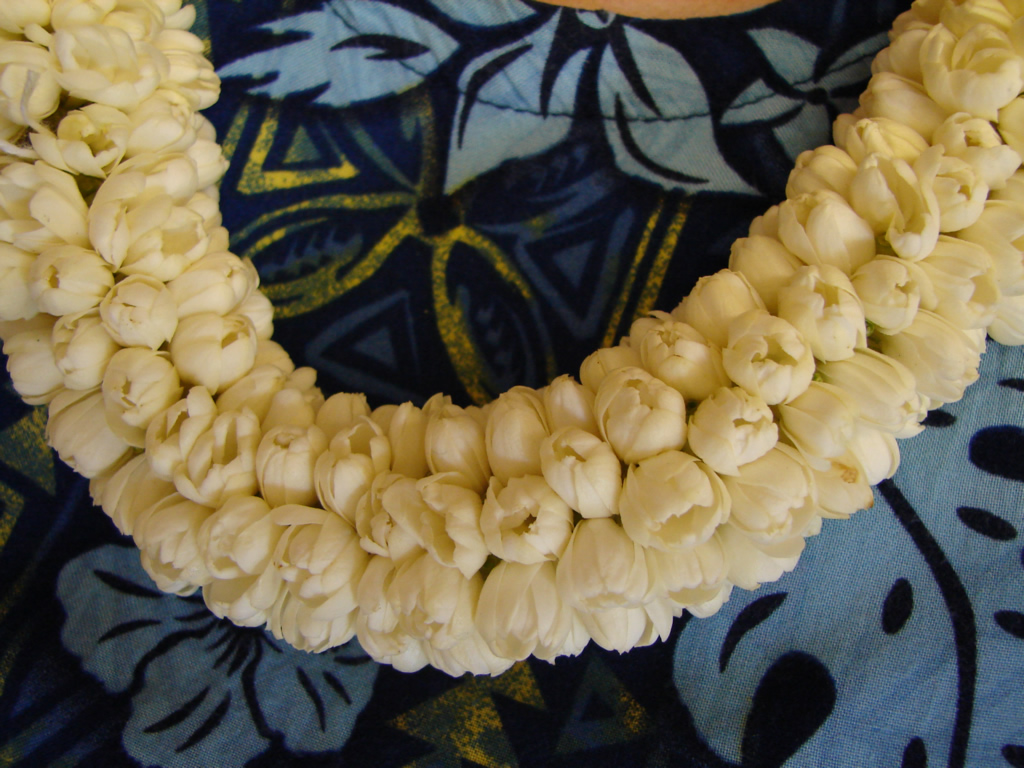
A fragrant lei of fresh pikake (Arabian jasmine)

A lei (/ˈleɪ/) is a garland or wreath, typically consisting of fresh natural foliage, common in Polynesia and the Philippines. More loosely defined, a lei is any series of objects strung together with the intent to be worn. Lei of various styles are given as gifts to honour people throughout the Pacific, being presented, for example, to visiting dignitaries, graduates, or to loved ones who are departing.

Lei gained popularity in the United States due to the common practice of presenting one to arriving or leaving tourists in Hawaii. Sampaguita leis are also used in the Philippines for religious reasons, typically worn to their Anito or religious statues.

== Symbolism ==
A lei can be given to someone for a variety of reasons. Most commonly, these reasons include peace, love, honor, or friendship. Common events during which leis may be distributed include graduations, weddings, and school dances. Often the composition of a lei determines its significance. A lei made using a hala fruit, for instance, is said to be connected to love, desire, transition, and change.

== Materials ==
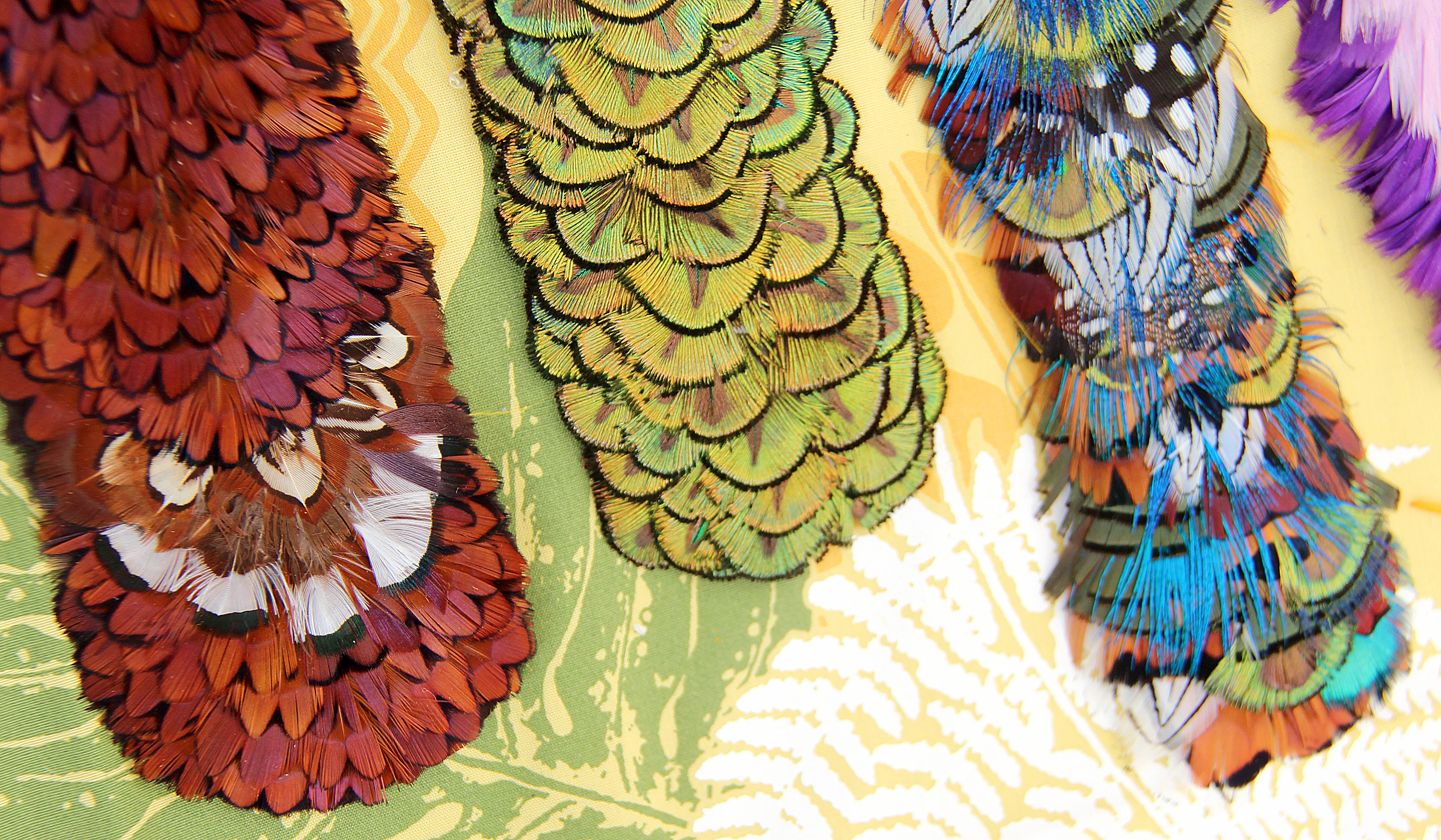
A Lei hulu, made from feathers

A lei may be composed of a pattern or series of just about anything, but most commonly consists of fresh natural foliage such as flowers, leaves, vines, fern fronds, and seeds. The most commonly used flowers are those of plumerias, tuberose, carnations, orchids, tiares, and pikake, though maile leaves, ferns, and tī leaves are extremely popular as well as traditional among hula dancers. Other types of lei may include sea or land shells, fish teeth, bones, feathers, plastic flowers, fabric, paper (including origami and monetary bills), candy, or anything that can be strung together in a series or pattern and worn as a wreath or a necklace. The Hawaiian island of Niʻihau is famous for its lei made of tiny gem-like shells (pūpū).

== Crafting ==
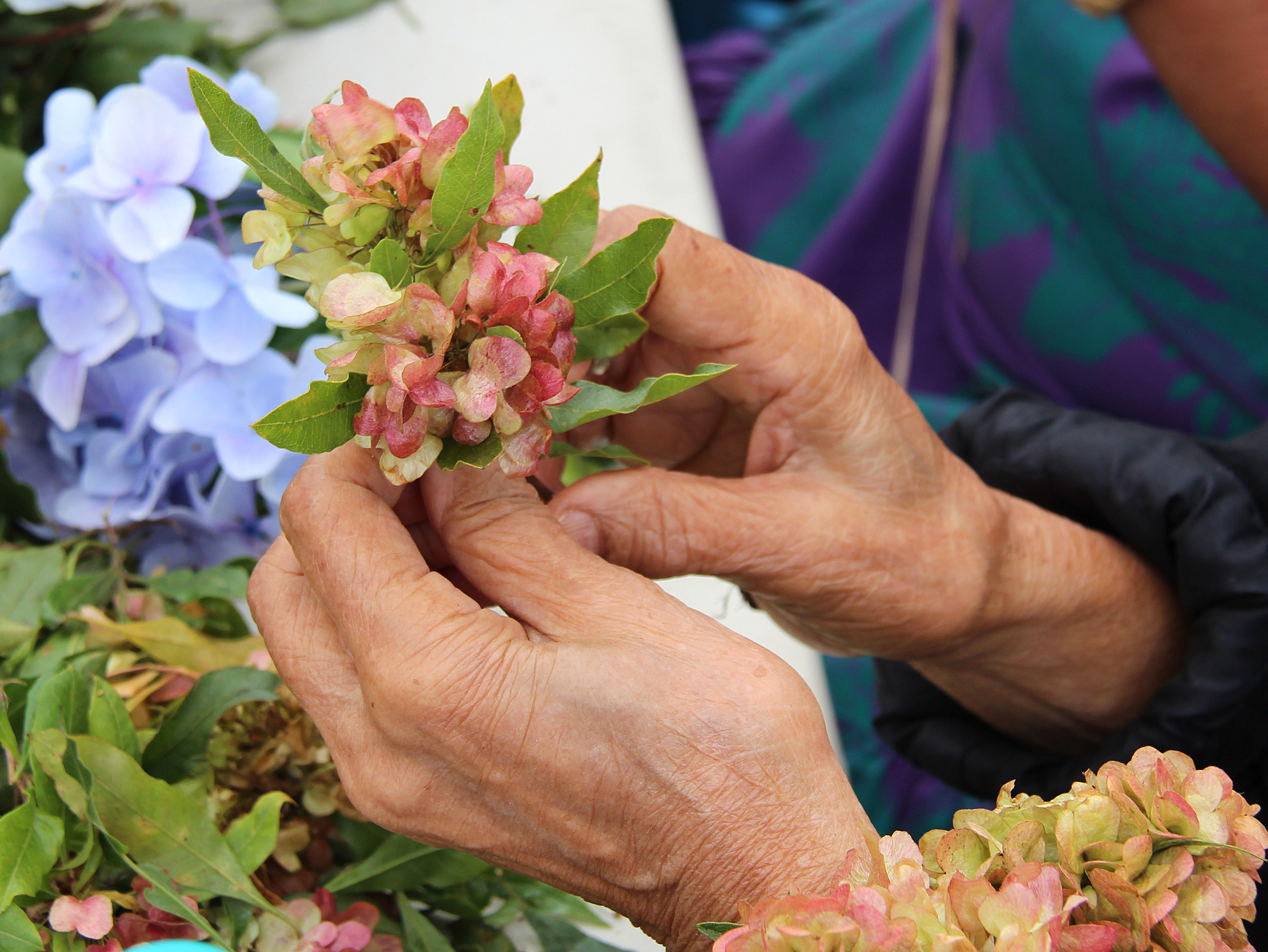
The Wili method of making leis

The eight most common methods of making lei are:

Haku: three-ply braid incorporating additional materials. A method of making a lei by using a base material, such as softened tree bark or long leaves, and braiding it while adding the decorative plant material into each wrap of the braid. Normally used for flowers and foliage with long pliable petioles or stems.

Hili: braid or plait with only one kind of material. Most commonly made from three or more strands of supple vine or fern braided together.

Hilo: twist, double helix, intertwine. A method of making a lei by twisting two strands together to form a "rope". The popular and simple lei lāʻī (tī leaf lei) is made using this method.

Hipuʻu / nipuʻu: a method of making a lei by knotting the stems of the decorative plant material and stringing the next stem through the knot. It requires a very long stem on the decorative material. Similar to a daisy chain.

Humu / humuhumu: sew to a backing, usually using a basting stitch. A method of making a lei by sewing the decorative material to a backing such as hala, laʻi, paper, or felt. Each successive row of lei material is overlapped on the previous to create a scale-like effect. Bougainvillea lei and feather hat lei often are made with this method.

Kui: pierce, piercing stitch. A method of making a lei by sewing or piercing the decorative material with a needle and stringing it onto a thread. This is probably the style with which most Westerners are familiar. This method is commonly used to string flowers such as plumeria, rose, carnation, etc.

Wili: wind, twist, crank, coil. A corkscrew-type twist, as found in a pig's tail and the seed pod of the wiliwili tree. A method of making a lei by winding fiber around successive short lengths of the decorative material. Sometimes base materials such as hala, laʻi, strands of raffia, or even strips of paper are used to make wrapping easier.

Haku mele: to braid a song. A song composed out of affection for an individual is considered a lei.

Lei may be open or closed, depending on circumstance.

These leis are traditionally constructed using natural foliage.

== Historical context ==
Leis were originally worn by ancient Polynesians and some Asian people. They were often used by Native Hawaiians to signify their ranks and royalty. They are also worn as a form of honor to each other and their gods. The religion of the Native Hawaiians as well as the hula custom is tied to leis.

Native Hawaiians, who are Polynesian, brought the tradition of lei making and wearing with them to the Hawaiian islands when they arrived. On the first of every May, an event called Lei Day is celebrated to honor the act of lei making and the custom surrounding it.

== Customs ==
There are many customs and protocols associated with the giving, receiving, wearing, storing, and disposing of lei. A story that originated during World War II tells of a hula dancer who dared to give a lei to a US soldier along with a kiss, leading it to become a tradition of lei distribution in modern times. To this day, leis remain a notable aspect of Hawaiian culture. Traditionalists give a lei by bowing slightly and raising it above the heart to allow the recipient to take it, as raising the hands above another's head, or touching the face or head, is considered disrespectful.

By tradition, only open lei are given to a pregnant or nursing woman. If due to allergies or other reasons a person cannot wear a lei which has just been given (for instance a musician who would tangle the lei in their guitar strap), the lei is displayed in a place of honor, such as the musician's music stand or microphone stand. Lei should never be thrown away casually, or tossed into the trash.

Traditionally they should be returned to the place they were gathered, or if that is not possible, they should be returned to the earth by hanging in a tree, burying, or burning. A lei represents love, and to throw one away represents throwing away the love of the giver. Many types of lei can be left in a window to dry, allowing the natural fragrance to fill the room. This technique is often used in cars as well.

=== Polynesia ===
In Polynesian cultures, a lei is something that is created by someone and given to another with the intent to decorate that person for an emotional reason—usually as a sign of affection. Common reasons include greeting, farewell, affection or love, friendship, appreciation, congratulation, recognition, or to otherwise draw attention to the recipient. In Samoa, similar garlands fashioned of entire flowers, buds, seeds, nuts, plant fibers, leaves, ferns, seashells, or flower petals are called "asoa" or "ula", while single flowers or clusters worn in the hair or on the ear are called sei. In Tahiti such garlands are referred to as "hei" and in the Cook Islands they are called an "ei".

Tongans are known for creating unique "kahoa" leis made of chains of flat, crescent or triangular arrangements made of flower petals and leaves sewn onto a leaf or cloth backing. In Niue the iconic lei is the kahoa hihi which made from strings of tiny, distinctively yellow snail (hihi) shells. Many modern Polynesian celebrations include the giving and receiving of leis in various forms, including recent adaptations of the flower/plant lei in which candy, folded currency bills, rolls of coinage, and even spam musubi are tied into garlands. "Non-traditional" materials such as cloth ribbon, sequins, cellophane wrap, curling ribbon, and yarn are often used to fashion leis in various forms today.

==== Hawaiʻi ====
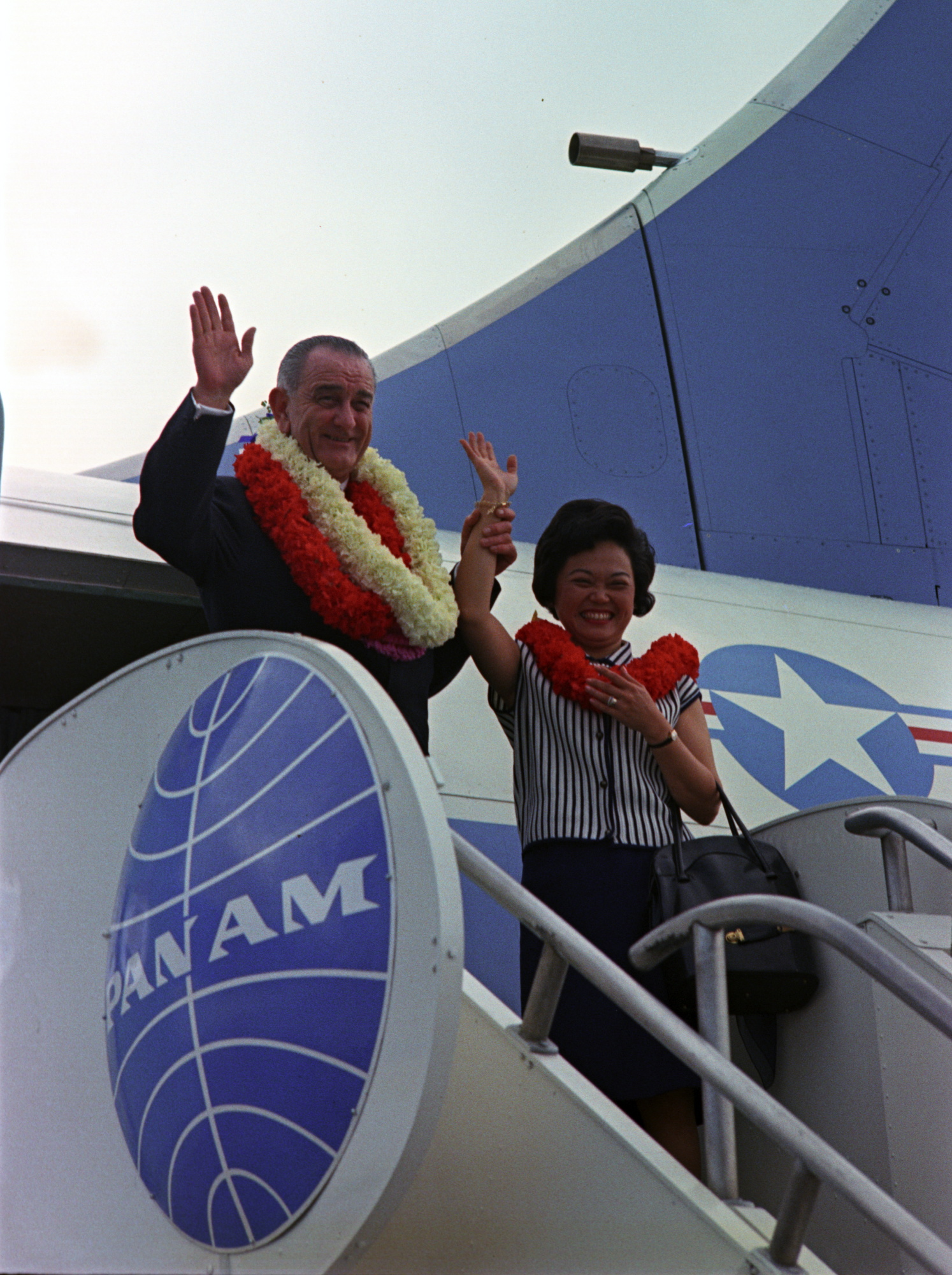
U.S. President Lyndon Johnson wears a lei while visiting Hawaii

Among residents of Hawaiʻi, the most popular occasions at which nā lei can be found are birthdays, graduations, weddings, funerals, retirement parties, and bridal showers. It is not uncommon for a high school or college graduate to be seen wearing so many nā lei that they reach their ears or higher.

On May 1 each year, Hawaiians celebrate "Lei Day", first conceived in 1927 by poet Don Blanding. At the time, Blanding was employed by the Honolulu Star Bulletin, and he shared his idea with columnist Grace Tower Warren, who came up with the phrase "May Day is Lei Day". The Hawaiian song "May Day is Lei Day in Hawaii" was composed in 1927 by Ruth and Leonard "Red" Hawk.

At the 81st Annual Mayor's Lei Day Celebration at Kapiʻolani Park in 2008, Honolulu set the record for the World's Longest Lei. Unofficially, the lei measured 5,336 feet (1,626 m) in length, more than a mile.

Notable Hawaiian artisans of feather lei (lei hulu) making include Mary Louise Kekuewa and Johanna Drew Cluney.

All of the major islands celebrate Lei Day, and each island is symbolized in pageantry by a specific type of lei and a color.

- Hawaiʻi: red, ʻōhiʻa lehua (Metrosideros polymorpha)
- Maui: pink, lokelani (Rosa damascena)
- Kahoʻolawe: gray or silver, hinahina (Heliotropium anomalum var. argentum)
- Lānaʻi: orange, kaunaʻoa (Cuscuta sandwichiana)
- Oʻahu: yellow or gold, ʻilima (Sida fallax)
- Molokaʻi: green, kukui (Aleurites moluccanus)
- Kauaʻi: purple, mokihana (Melicope anisata)
- Niʻihau: white, pūpū o Niʻihau (Niʻihau shells)

=== Philippines ===
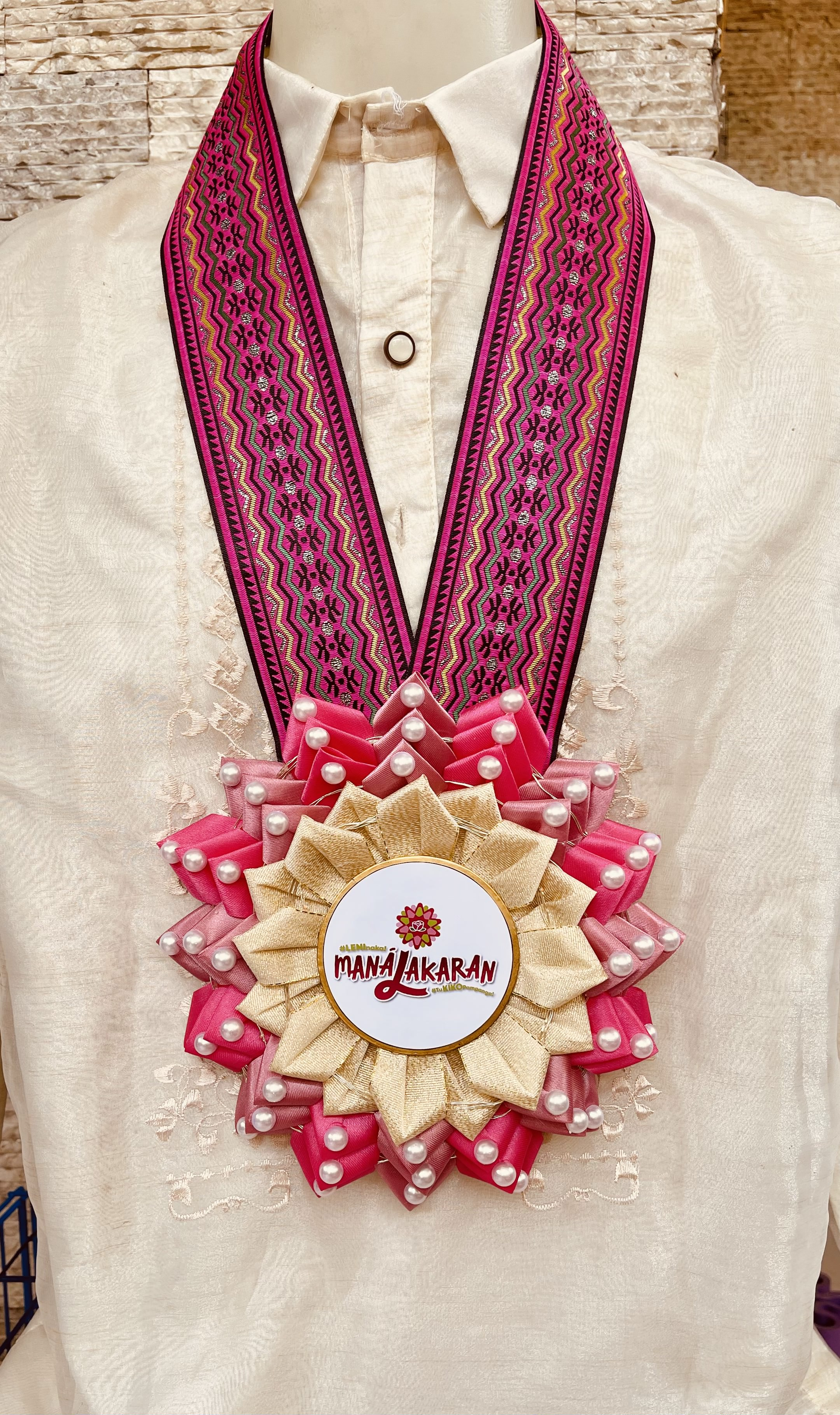
Pink rosette lei worn by Vice President Leni Robredo during a campaign rally in Pampanga, Philippines

Traditionally, guests in the Philippines are welcomed by being given a flower necklace made of sampaguita, the country's national flower. However, in recent years, more affordable options have emerged. One popular modern option is a rosette lei, made of brocade and satin ribbon for the rosette. This became popular over time as fresh flowers are hard to maintain, especially during long events.

== Gallery ==
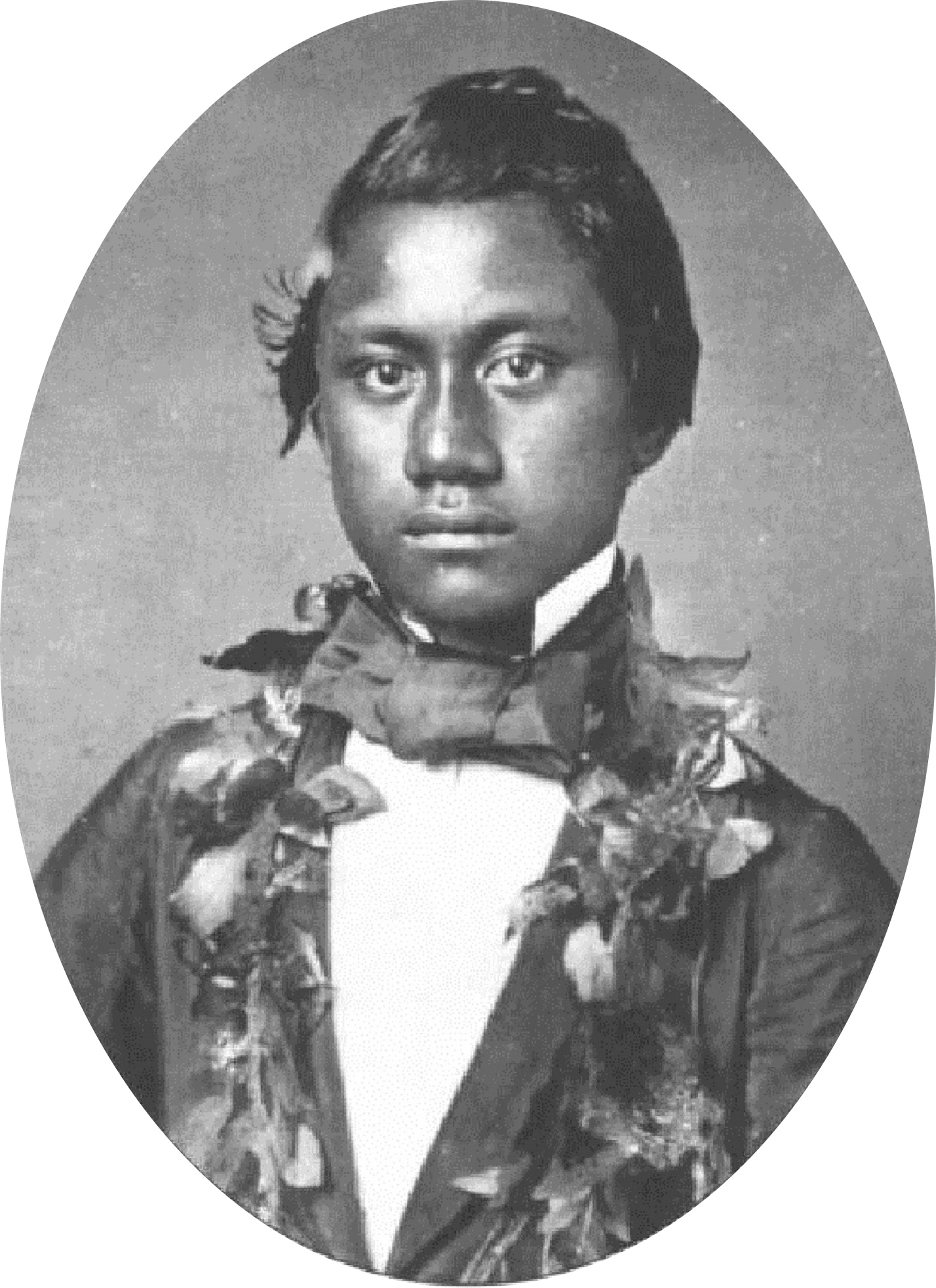
Prince Alexander Liholiho wearing a lei garland

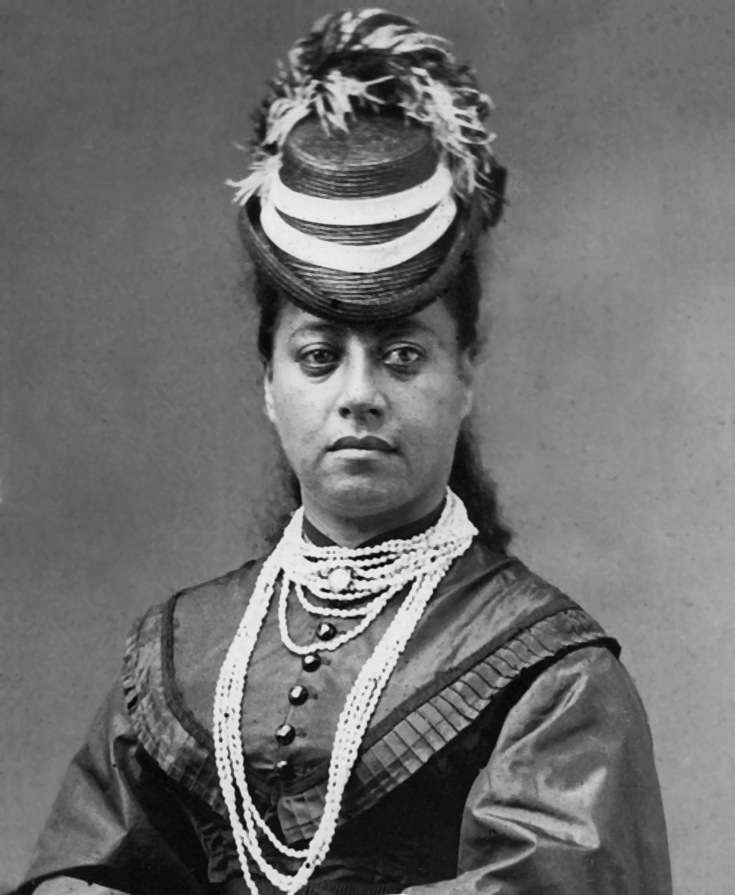
Queen Emma wearing multiple strands of lei pūpū o Niʻihau

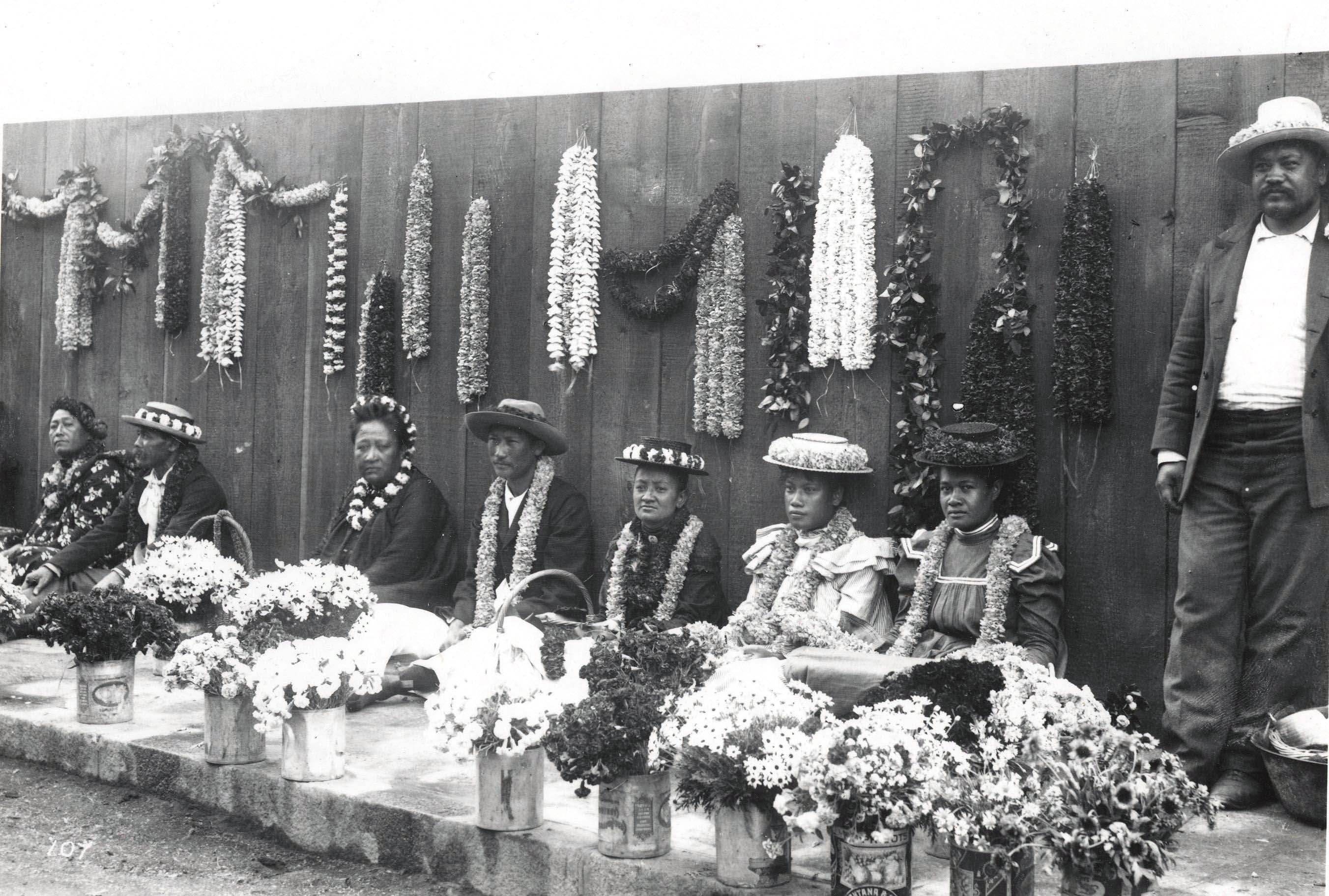
Hawaiian lei vendors, c. 1901.

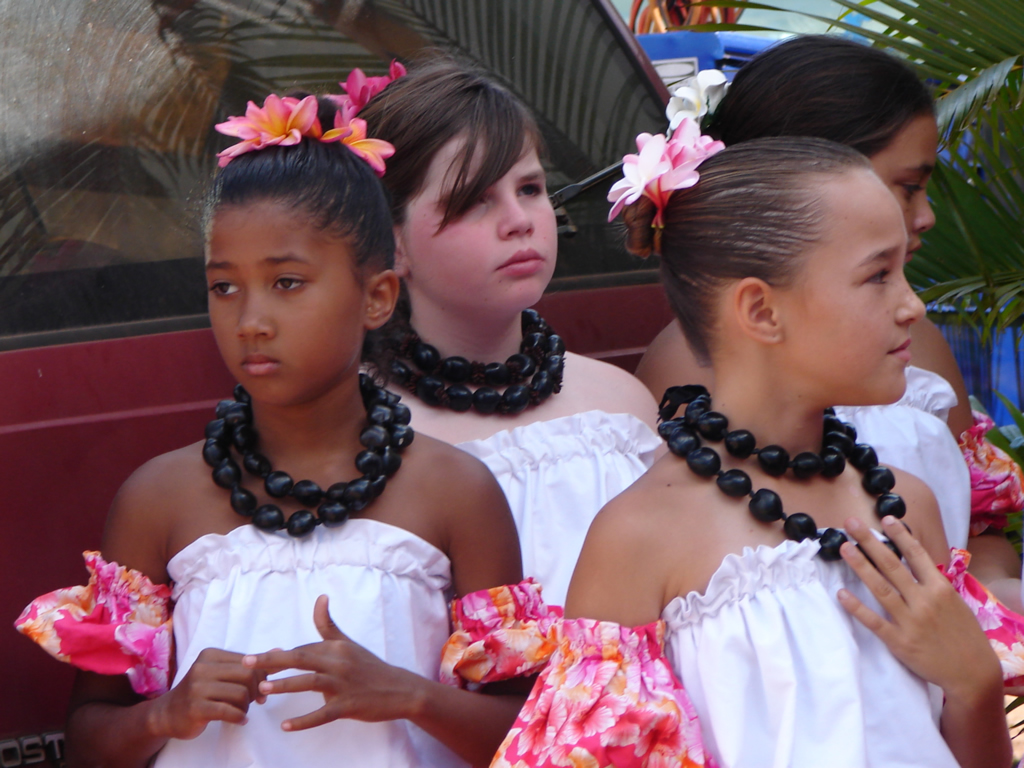
Young hula dancers wearing kukui nut lei in preparation for a performance on Molokai.

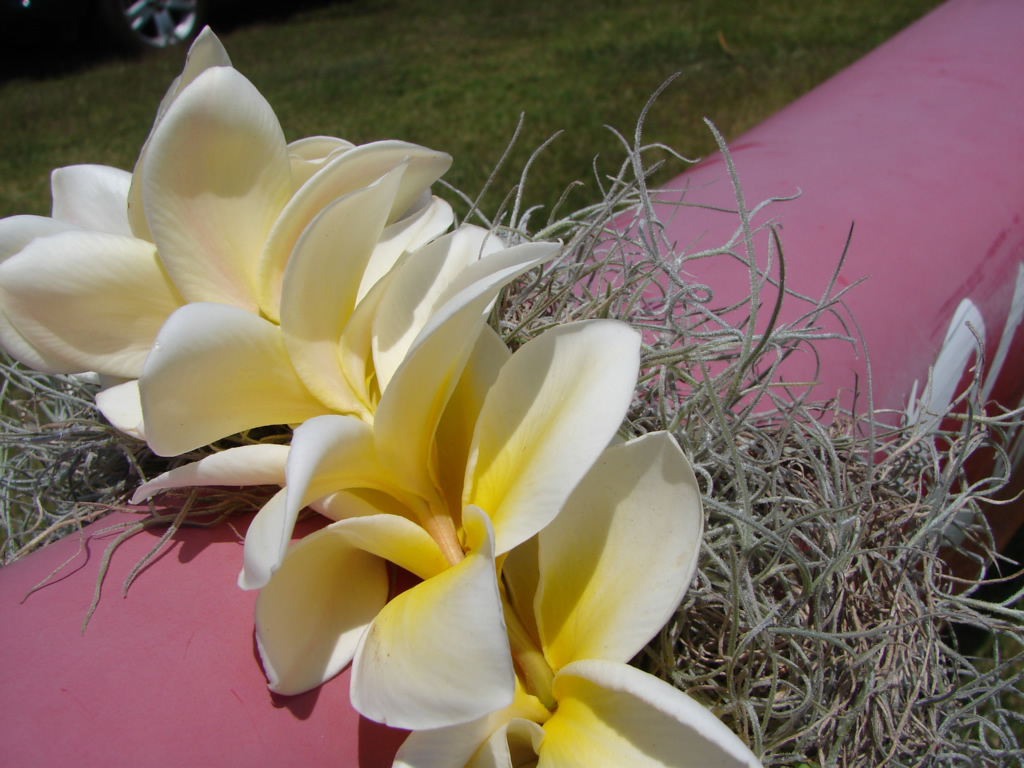
Lei of plumeria flowers and 'umi'umi-o-dole (Spanish moss) on an outrigger canoe at a blessing.

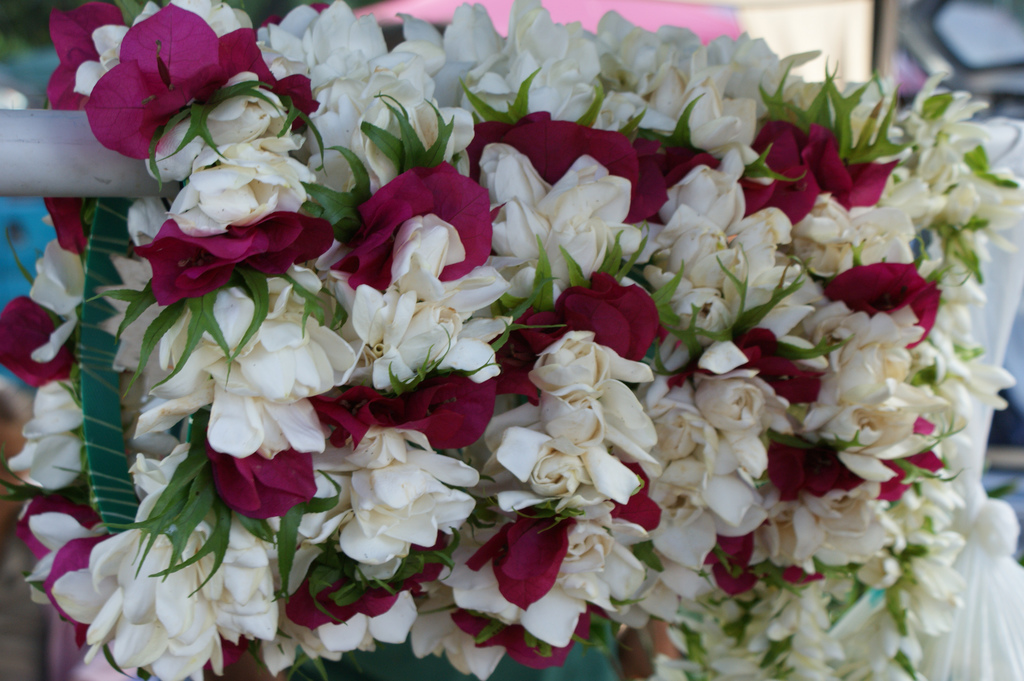
Lei for sale in the Cook Islands

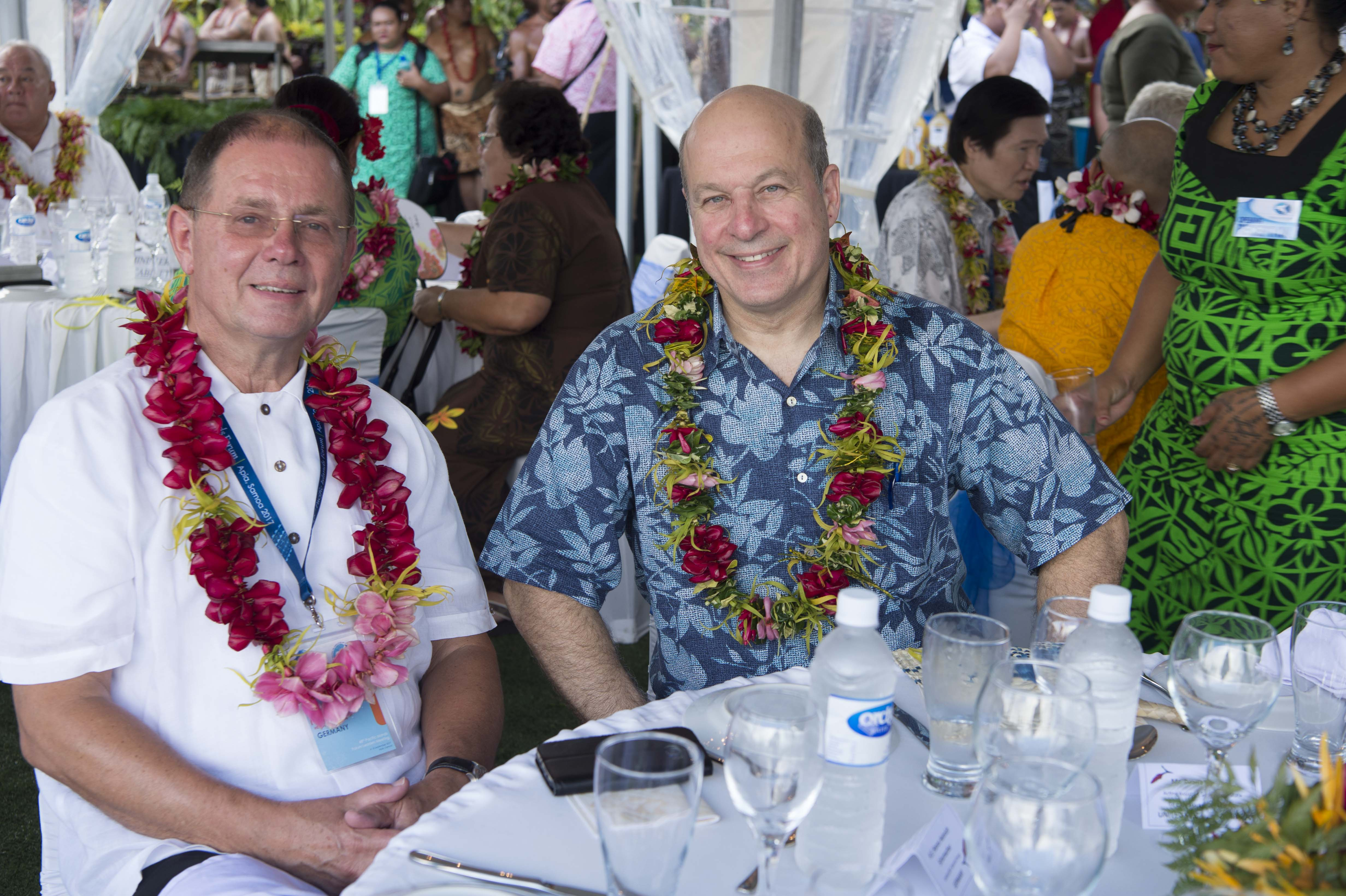
Delegates at the 2017 Pacific Islands Forum

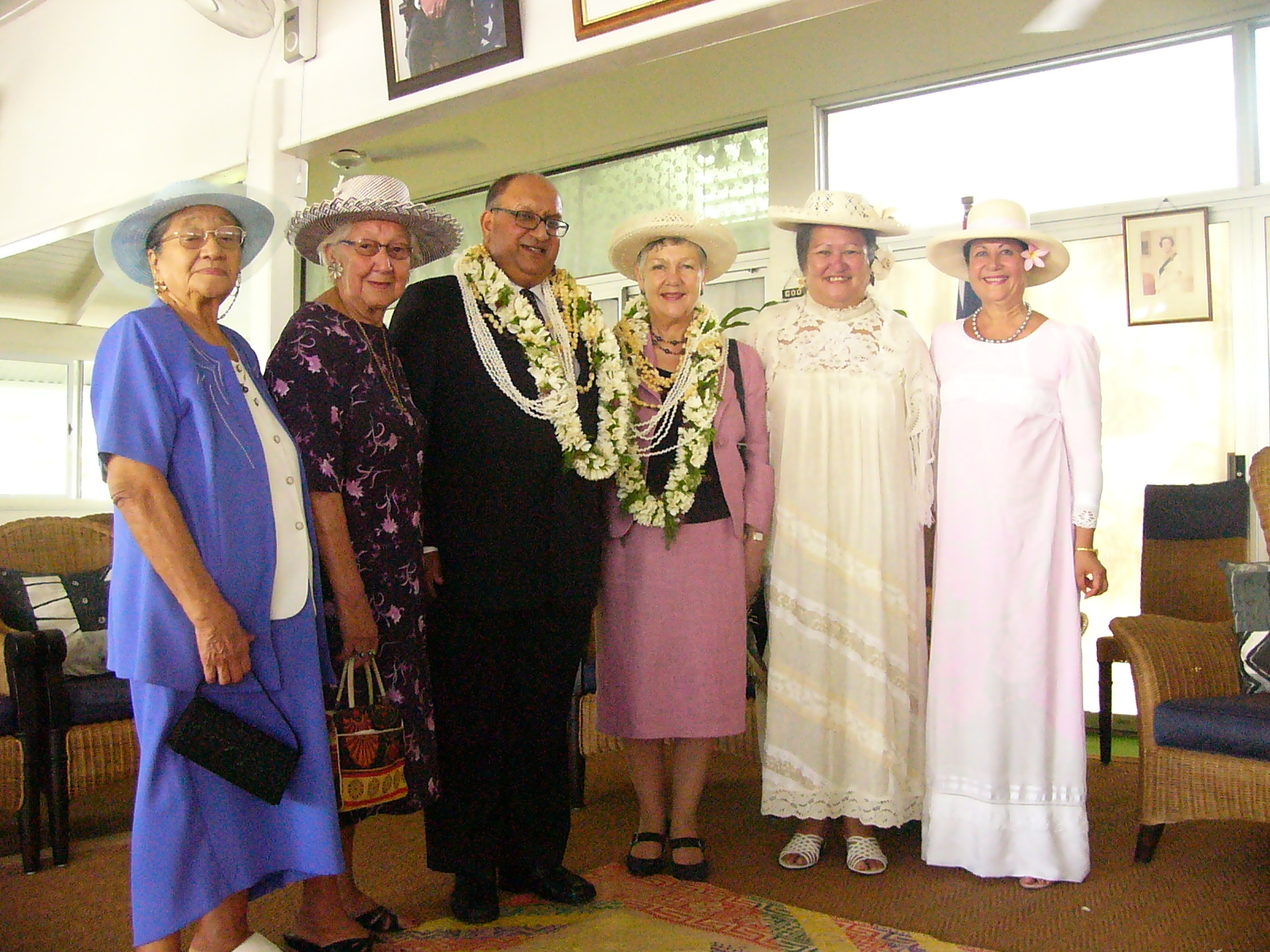
Anand Satyanand and Lady Satyanand wear lei while visiting the Cook Islands

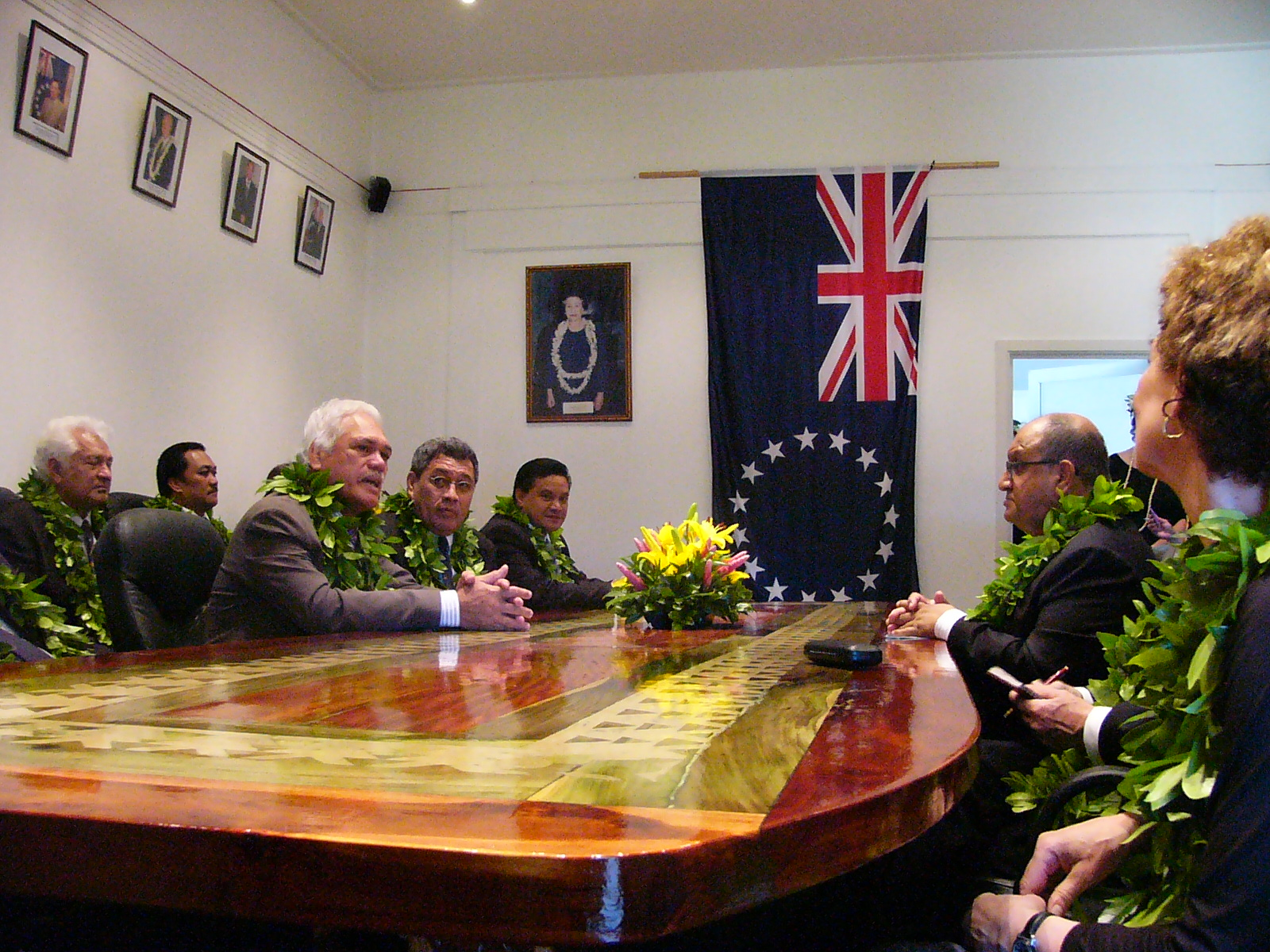
New Zealand Governor General and members of the Cook Islands cabinet wear lei at a meeting.

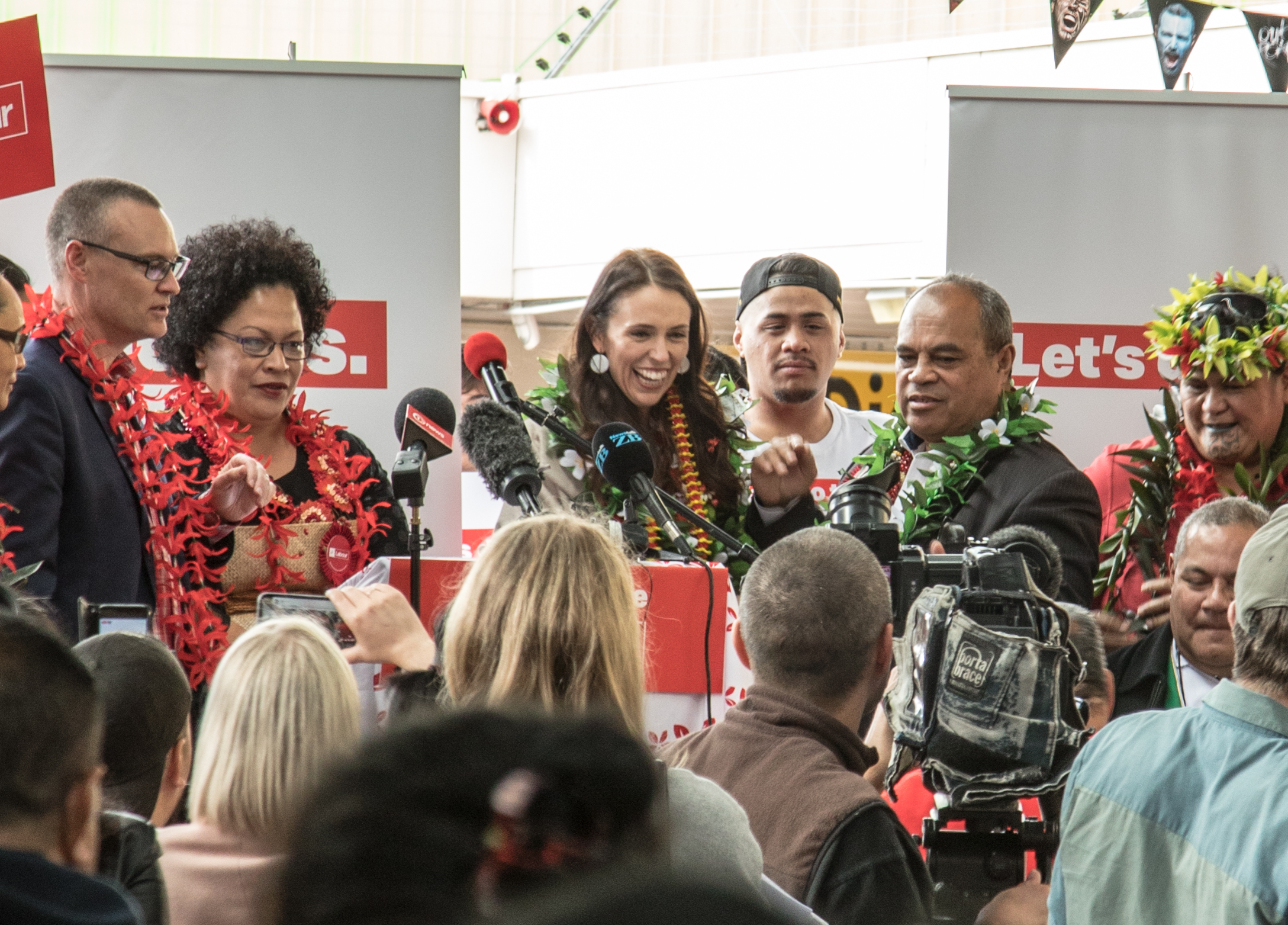
Prime Minister of New Zealand Jacinda Ardern and Pasifika Members of Parliament wear lei at an event.

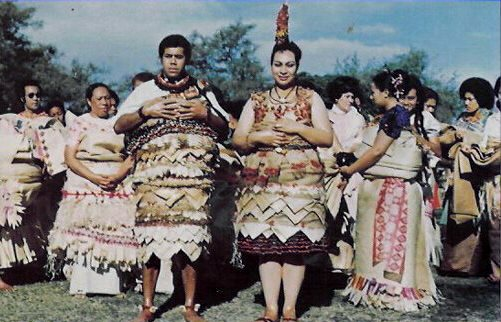
Royal Tongan Wedding of 1976

== See also ==
- Garland – Decorative wreath or cord, used at festive occasions
- Japamala – Indian prayer bead string
- Namaste – Customary Hindu greeting
- Phuang malai – Thai floral garland
