= Mary Catton =

American Hawaiian social worker (1882–1971)

- Born: Margaret Mary Louise Catton; February 9, 1882; Huelo, Maui, Kingdom of Hawaii (now United States)
- Died: May 9, 1971 (aged 89); Kaneohe, Hawaii, United States
- Burial place: O'ahu Cemetery, Honolulu, Hawaii, United States
- Education: New York School of Social Work
- Occupations: Social worker, author

Mary Catton (née Margaret Mary Louise Catton; February 9, 1882 – May 9, 1971) was an American Hawaiian early social worker in Honolulu. She was the first woman from Hawaii to graduate from a social work degree program in 1919, and the first person to organize social services in hospitals in Hawaii in 1923.

== Early life and education ==
Margaret Mary Louise Catton was born on February 9, 1882, in Huelo, Maui, to parents Brereton Lewis (née Streat) from the British West Indies, and Scottish-born Robert Catton. Her parents arrived in Hawaii in 1878, her mother worked in an iron foundry; and her father was a businessperson who had invented and manufactured machinery for sugar plantations on the islands.

She attended the Punahou School in Honolulu, and various other private schools in Hawaii and Scotland. Catton graduated in 1919 in hospital social service from New York School of Social Work (now Columbia University School of Social Work) in New York City.

== Career ==
After graduation from college, Catton returned to Hawaii and worked as a probation officer for girls. She also had a great interest in expanding the Hospital Flower Society which had inspired her to study social work, it was a historic charitable program to bring flowers to people that needed them in hospitals.

Catton became the director of the Medical Social Service Association of Hawaii in 1923, a new program she helped found at Queen's Hospital (now The Queen's Medical Center). The program assisted physicians in treatment, by bringing attention personal and environmental issues that could impact treatment. She retired in 1948 as director of the Medical Social Service Association of Hawaii at Queen's Hospital.

She started many other programs and organizations in Hawaii, including the Hawaii Medical Service Association in 1935, which was founded as the first voluntary prepaid plan for medical care in the United States; the Bureau of Mental Hygiene at Queen's Hospital; and a nursing home at Maunalani Heights.

In 1959, Catton authored and published the book Social Service in Hawaii. Catton served as mentor for Hawaiian social worker Clorinda Low Lucas.

She died on May 9, 1971, in Kahanaola Convalescent Hospital in Kaneohe.

== Publications ==
- Catton, Margaret M. L.; Zane, Dora (February 1935). "Service for the Blind in Hawaii". Journal of Visual Impairment & Blindness. 29 (1): 15–20. doi:10.1177/0145482X3502900 (inactive July 13, 2025).
- Catton, Margaret Mary Louise (1959). Social Service in Hawaii. Palo Alto, CA: Pacific Book Publishers. pp. 99–101, 102–103, 289. OCLC 1970774.
