= Dora Chung Zane =

American social worker (1904–1991)

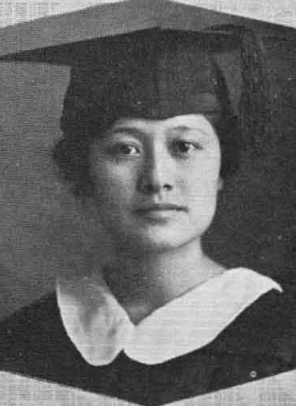
- Dora Chung Zane, from the 1927 yearbook of the University of Hawai'i
- Born: Dora Chung; July 6, 1904; Honolulu, Kingdom of Hawaii (now United States)
- Died: June 2, 1991 (aged 86); Maunawili, Hawaii, United States
- Occupation: medical social worker
- Known for: services for blind people in Hawaii

Dora Chung Zane (July 6, 1904 – June 2, 1991) was an American Hawaiian medical social worker and clubwoman in Hawaii, specializing in services for blind people and children with disabilities.

== Early life and education ==
Dora Chung was born in Honolulu, one of the eight children of Chung Kun Ai. Her father, who was born in Guangdong Province in South China, was a classmate of Sun Yat-sen, and became a wealthy businessman and philanthropist in Hawaii.

Dora Chung trained as a teacher at the Hawaii Territorial Normal School, graduating in 1924. She earned a bachelor's degree from the University of Hawaiʻi in 1927, and earned a social work degree at Simmons College in Boston. In 1933 she received a scholarship from the National Society for the Prevention of Blindness, to study at the Massachusetts Eye and Ear Infirmary, and at the New York State Commission for the Blind.

== Career ==
Zane taught at the Ananhola School on Kauai as a young woman. She was a medical social worker at Kauikeolani Children's Hospital and St. Francis Hospital, and one of the founding members of the Hawaii chapter of the American Association of Hospital Social Workers. She organized public education programs on eye health. She was assistant to Grace Crosby Hamman in establishing and running the Bureau for Sight Conservation and Blind Services in the Territory of Hawaii. She was elected treasurer of the Oahu Association for the Adult Blind in 1937. In the 1950s she served on the Territorial Commission on Children and Youth.

Zane was also an active clubwoman. She was a member of the Associated Chinese University Women, and represented Hawaii at the Pan-Pacific Women's Conference in Vancouver in 1937. She was a leader in the YWCA in Honolulu. She and her husband were active in the Hawaii Kennel Club., and in 1962 she won an award from the Dog Writers' Association of America for her newspaper story, "Tippy Has Two to Go On", about a dog with two legs.

== Personal life ==
Dora Chung married Arthur K. Y. Zane, a dog expert. She died in 1991, aged 86, in Maunawili. An orchid hybrid, Dendrobium Dora Zane, was named in her memory.

== Publications ==
- Catton, Margaret M. L.; Zane, Dora (February 1935). "Service for the Blind in Hawaii". Journal of Visual Impairment & Blindness. 29 (1): 15–20. doi:10.1177/0145482X3502900 (inactive 13 August 2025).
