= Kamaka Stillman =

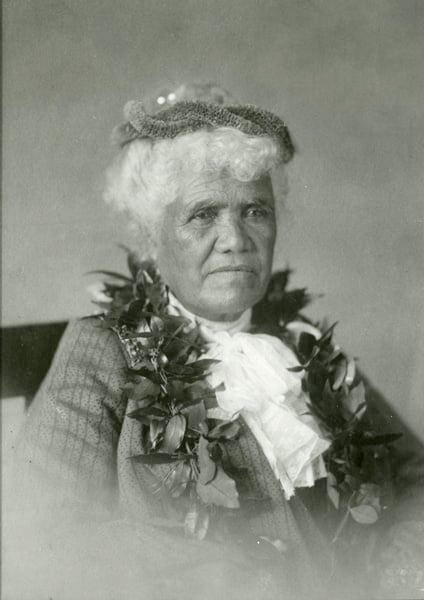
- Born: January 1, 1823; Hawaii (island)
- Died: July 25, 1924 (aged 101); Honolulu, Oahu
- Burial: Oahu Cemetery
- Spouse: Henry Martyn Stillman
- Issue: Rose Kapuakomela McInerny; Oliver Kawailahaole Stillman; Charles Keonaona Stillman; Jennie Kapahukalaunu Smythe; Helen Anianiku Cushingham
- Father: Kekahili
- Mother: Kapiimoku

Ke Aliʻi Kamaka Oukamakaokawaukeoiopiopio Stillman (1823–1924) was an aliʻi (hereditary noble) of the Kingdom of Hawaii as well a prominent figure after its overthrow through equestrianism as a Paʻu rider in the Kamehameha Day celebrations as well as an acknowledged authority on Hawaiian genealogy and oral chants. She is descended from Kahaopuolani, the aliʻi wahine (noble mother) who had hidden Kamehameha I as a baby and raised him for years in Kohala, Hawaiʻi along with his brother and her own children. Stillman published a response to a 1911, Hawaiian Newspaper account of the birth of Kamehameha the Great, correcting information from the oral traditions handed down within the Kahala family.

== Family ==
Kamaka is a great granddaughter of Kaukane (w) who was the daughter of Ke Aliʻi Kahaopuolani, the caretaker of the infant Kamehameha I. She was the mother of Jane "Jennie" Smythe who served as a lady-in-waiting for Queen Emma. She was a part of every royal funeral cortege since she was a very young girl. The Stillman family, a wealthy banking family from New York lived in a large house on School Street, facing Stillman Lane. Henry Stillman was the son of Levi Stillman and his second wife Magaret Chapin. Kamaka married Stillman in 1860.

Henry and Kamaka had five children, Rose Kapuakomela, Oliver Kawailahaole Stillman born February 8, 1861, Helen Anianku Stillman born September 3, 1862, Charles Keonaona Stillman born June 1864 and Jane Kapakukalauna Stillman born January 19, 1869.
