= Columbia University School of Social Work =

Graduate school

Coordinates: 40°48′37″N 73°57′30″W

- Former names: Summer School of Philanthropic Work; New York School of Philanthropy
- Type: Private
- Established: 1898; 128 years ago
- Dean: Melissa D. Begg
- Postgraduates: 1,093
- Location: New York City, New York, United States
- Website: socialwork.columbia.edu

The Columbia University School of Social Work (also referred to as the Columbia School of Social Work) is the graduate school of social work of Columbia University in New York City. It is one of the oldest social work programs in the US, with roots extending back to 1898. It began awarding a Master of Science degree in 1940. As of 2018, it was one of the largest social work schools in the United States, with an enrollment of over 1,000 students.

== History ==
=== 1898–1999 ===
In 1898, the New York Charity Organization Society established the first Summer School in Philanthropic Work, a six-week program, at 105 East 22nd Street in New York City. Twenty-five men and women attended the first classes. It is one of the oldest social work programs in the US. In 1904, it was expanded into the first full-time full-year course of graduate study in social work, and later a two-year course, at the newly renamed New York School of Philanthropy.

In 1915, Winona Cargile Alexander became the first African-American woman to graduate from the Columbia School of Social Work.

The name of the School was changed in 1919 to the New York School of Social Work. In 1931, the School moved to 122 East 22nd Street. In 1940, the School was affiliated with Columbia University as one of its graduate schools, and began awarding a Master of Science degree. In 1949, the School moved to the Andrew Carnegie Mansion at 2 East 91st Street, and later to 622 West 113th Street. The first doctoral degree was awarded in 1952.

In 1961, the School formed a coalition in support of President John F. Kennedy establishing the Peace Corps. In 1963 the name of the school was changed to Columbia University School of Social Work. In 1966, the School began a longitudinal study of foster children and their families. The first fully endowed professorship was set up in 1991, followed by the full endowment of the Kenworthy Chair and nine additional endowed professorships. In 1997, an agreement was concluded with the UN Economic and Social Council to provide new program support and a fellowship. In that year, the school's endowment surpassed $40 million.

In 1992, students of the school organized protests and teach-ins as part of a nationwide effort to protest welfare cuts. The organizers of the school's events called the welfare cuts an example of the demonization of people on welfare.

=== 2000–present ===
In 2002, construction of the current School of Social Work building began on Amsterdam Avenue and West 121st Street, north of Columbia's campus. The building was completed in 2004 and first used by students and faculty during the 2004–05 academic year. In 2007, the School founded the Global Health Research Center of Central Asia to develop and advance evidence-based, sustainable solutions to emerging public health and social issues in the region, receiving funding from the National Institutes of Health.

In 2012, the School established the Fisher Cummings Washington Fellows Program with a major gift. The program funds select students for a semester-long internship in Washington, D.C., with an emphasis on working to promote social justice and the well-being of women, children, and families at the federal level. In 2014, the School opened its Online Campus for earning a Master's of Science in Social Work (MSSW) from various major cities across the United States.

In 2014, the "Beyond The Bars" conference was hosted by Columbia Center for Justice. This conference is hosted by students, faculty, and community leaders who have been impacted by incarceration.

== Student body and faculty ==
As of 2023, the School had 1,093 students. It had 36 full-time faculty, and 233 part-time faculty. The School received $15 million of externally sponsored research expenditures in 2022. During their MSW, students have the choice between four different pathways: Advanced Clinical Practice (ACP), Integrated Practice and Programming (IPP), Policy Practice (PP), and Leadership Management and Entrepreneurship (LME).

== Achievements, mission, and journal ==
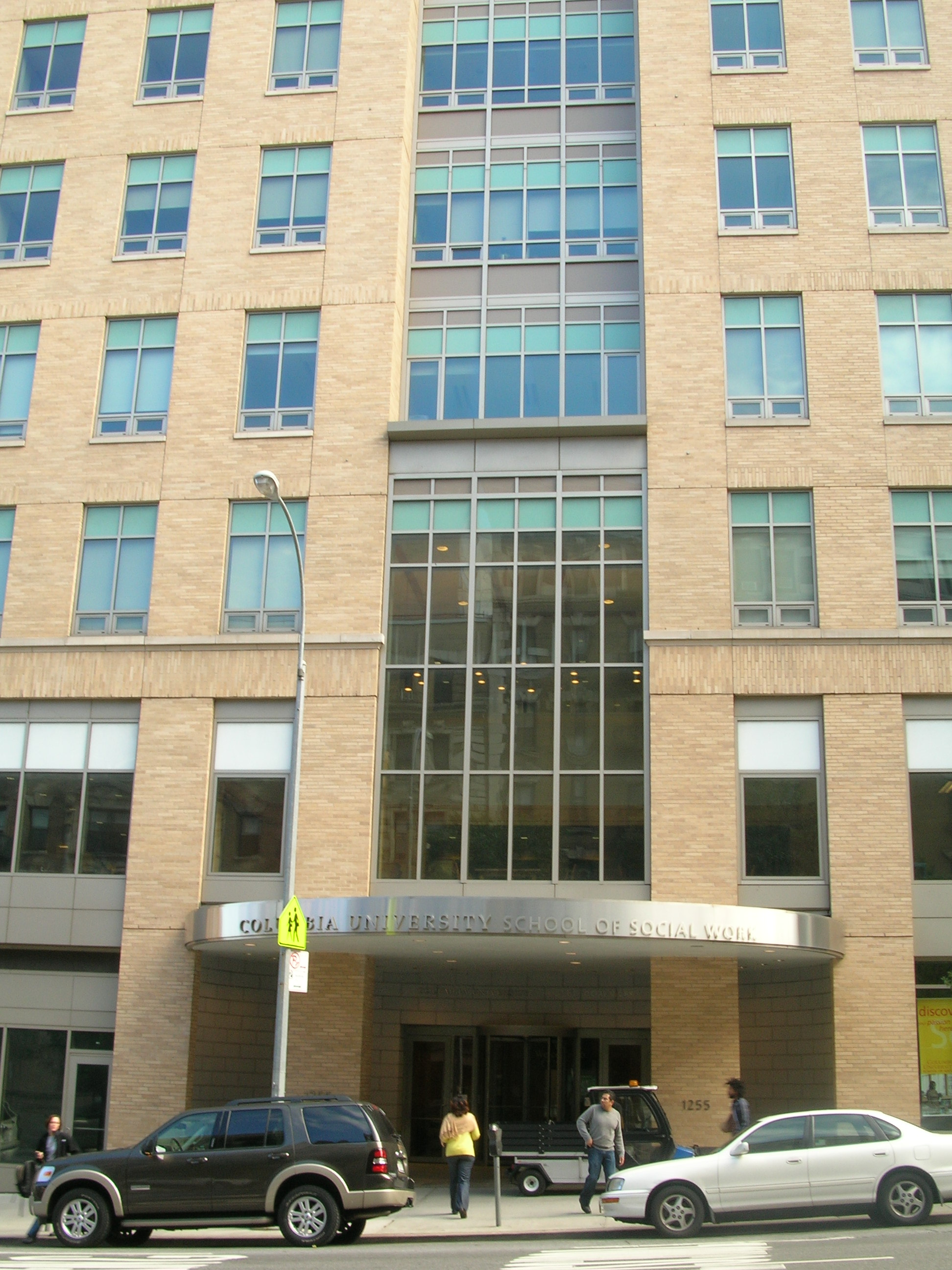
Entrance to the Columbia University School of Social Work

The School has helped form the Urban League and the White House Conferences on Children and Youth. The School was one of the first to develop an ecological approach to social work. Members of the School faculty assisted Franklin Delano Roosevelt's Secretary of Labor Frances Perkins in writing and implementing the Social Security Act of 1935. During and after World War II, the School staff helped to extend the social work role into the military. The School's 1966 study on foster children and their parents has also had an impact on national policy.

In 2008, the School was ranked fourth in U.S. News & World Report rankings of "America's Best Graduate Best Social Work Programs." Between 1990 and 2004, the School ranked 19th out of 61 social work doctoral programs in admissions selectivity.

The School's mission focuses on the development of leaders in social work practice and research, the advancement of the social work profession, professional values, knowledge, and skills, and the enhancement of well-being and the promotion of human rights and social justice at the local, national, and global level through the creation of responsive social programs and policies.

In 2003, the School began publishing the Journal of Student Social Work The Journal is a scholarly publication featuring articles related to all aspects of the social work profession, including clinical practice, public policy, and administration. In 2010 The Journal was renamed the Columbia Social Work Review.

== Notable alumni and faculty ==
- Mary Catton (1882–1971), graduated in 1919. founder of Medical Social Service Association of Hawaii in 1923.
- Antonia Pantoja (1922–2002), received her MSW from the school in 1954. She was regarded by many in the Puerto Rican Latino community as one of the most important civil rights leaders in the United States. She founded ASPIRA and received the Presidential Medal of Freedom from President Clinton in 1997.
- Ann Klein (1923–1986), politician who served in the New Jersey General Assembly and was the first woman to run for Governor of New Jersey.
- Ada Deer (1935–2023), Native American advocate and scholar, received her MSW from the school in 1961. She became the first woman to be appointed Assistant Secretary of Indian Affairs, US Department of the Interior, the first Native American woman to run for Congress in Wisconsin, the first native American to lobby Congress successfully to restore tribal rights, and the first Chairwoman of her Menominee tribe.
- Josefa Jara Martinez (1894–1987), founder of the first school of social work in the Philippines, affiliated with the Philippine Women's University, and director of the non-governmental agency, the Philippine Rural Reconstruction Movement (PRRM).
- Sheila Oliver (1952–2023), New Jersey state legislator, 169th Speaker of the New Jersey General Assembly, and 2nd Lieutenant Governor of New Jersey.
- Jared Bernstein (born 1955), received his Ph.D. in Social Welfare from the school. He is a Senior Fellow at the Center on Budget and Policy Priorities and former Chief Economist and Economic Adviser to then-Vice President Joseph Biden in the Obama Administration. His federal appointment represented a progressive perspective and provided a strong advocate for workers.

== Rankings and reputation ==
As of 2024, it is ranked tied for 4th out of 319 schools for social work in the United States by U.S. News & World Report.

== See also ==
List of social work schools
