= Lāʻau lapaʻau =

Traditional Native Hawaiian medicine

Lāʻau lapaʻau is a traditional medical practice of Native Hawaiians. The Hawaiian words lāʻau and lapaʻau mean plants or vegetation and treat, heal, or cure respectively in 'Olelo Hawaiʻi. Lā'au lapa'au follows a belief system that physical illness is a result of a loss of mana (energy) or pono (righteousness) within oneself. This practice involves using native plants, herbs and spirituality to treat ailments and injuries. Lāʻau lapaʻau is practiced by Native Hawaiian healers known as kahuna lāʻau lapaʻau who are trained in understanding the proper use of each lā'au.

== History ==
The history of lā'au lapa'au has been shared by generations for over a thousand years. Traditional Native Hawaiian medicinal practices are based on holistic healing in which the mind, body and spirit are intertwined. This practice was deeply embedded in pre-colonial Native Hawaiian society, but was later affected by colonial influences.

=== Kahuna in ancient native Hawaiian society ===
Prior to Western contact, Ancient Hawaiian society relied heavily on the kahuna class, those who were experts of a particular skills such as lā'au lapa'au. They were selected to undergo training at a young age. Kahuna were heavily revered and integral in other societal systems such as the kapu system which outlined what activities and behaviors were considered off limits. According to ancient iterations of lā'au lapa'au, those who violated kapu would have illness befall on them and fraudulent kahuna could face a death penalty. During this era, prior to 1778, Native Hawaiians experienced a limited range of diseases, solely trauma and degenerative associated, due to geographical isolation.

=== Post-western contact ===
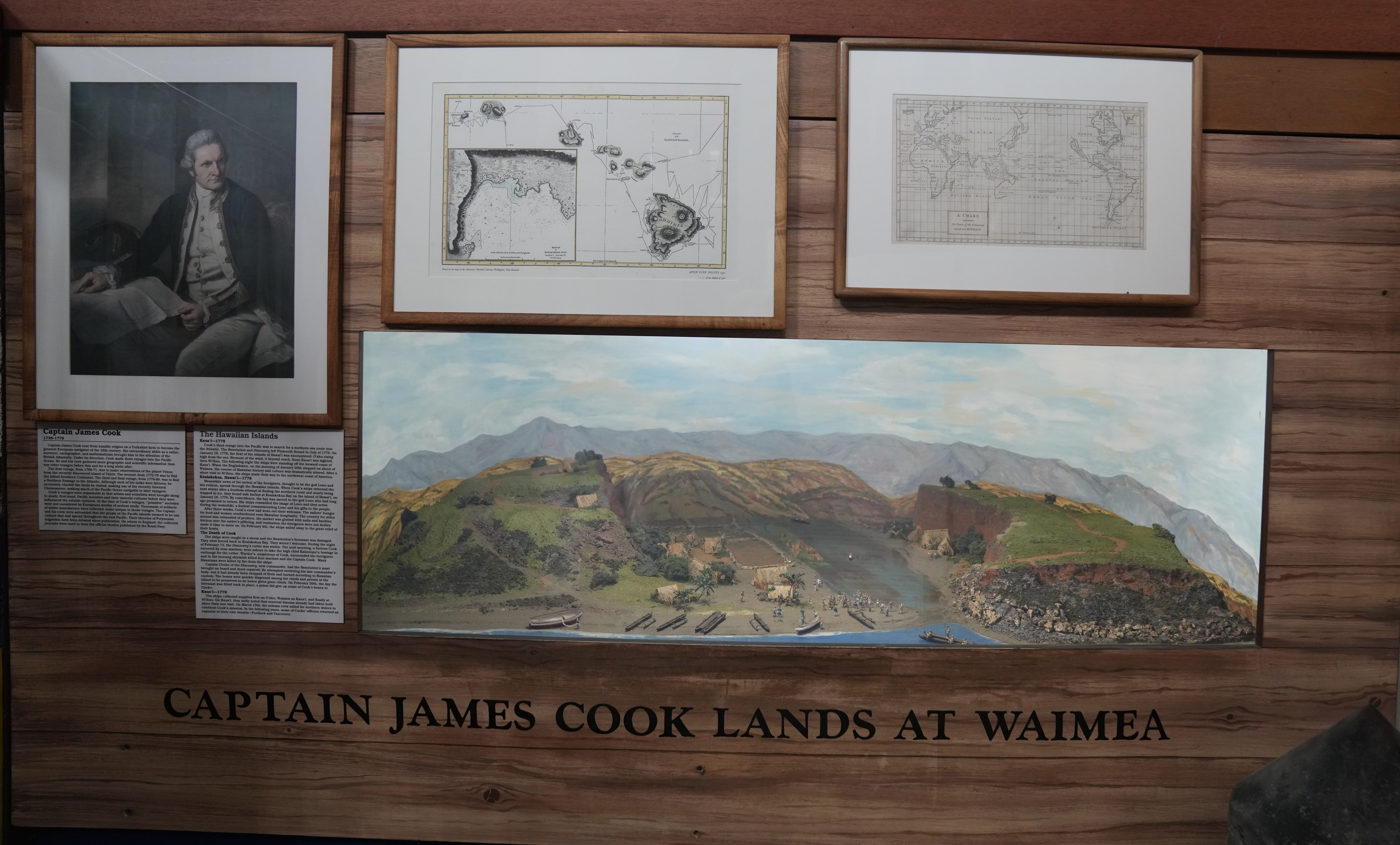
Captain James Cook's arrival to Hawaii in 1778 and the beginning of Western influence in the Hawaiian islands.

With the introduction of Europeans in Hawaii in 1778, the influence of Christianity changed the ancient ways of living. When missionaries arrived in Hawaiʻi in 1820, they believed that lā'au lapa'au was black magic. Confusing kahuna lā'au lapa'au for kahuna ana'ana, experts of "sorcery", they abolished traditional Hawaiian medical practices altogether. Shortly after the death of King Kamehameha I in 1819, the abolishment of the Kapu System also threatened the social infrastructure that supported lā'au lapa'au. Lomilomi (massage) was the only healing art legal to practice in 1819. Though the practice was banned, kahuna continued to practice in secret. However, beyond political turmoil, the integrity of the kahuna lā'au lapa'au was also threatened by the introduction of disease. The introduction of new diseases in the 1880s such as tuberculosis, Hansen's disease, measles, influenza, cholera, gastroenteritis, mumps, scarlet fever, and more, left kahuna ill-equipped with resources and knowledge to treat new diseases that the Native Hawaiian community had no immunity to. The Revised Laws of Hawaii, Chapter 89, Section 1077 decreed that kahunas would face fines or imprisonment for practicing healing arts.

=== Licensing and certification ===
In 1919, the Territorial Legislature created a Hawaiʻi Medicine Board that was responsible for licensing lāʻau lapaʻau practitioners. The board was composed primarily of White members who had little knowledge regarding Native Hawaiian healing. The board developed licensing protocol that required practitioners to use the Western names for plants. Many renowned kahuna were unable to obtain a license to practice due to language barriers since they were trained in 'Ōlelo Hawaiʻi, not Latin. The Board was abolished in 1959. Lā'au lapa'au was recognized as a traditional medicine in the Native Hawaiian Health Care Act passed by the United States Congress in 1988.

== Practice ==
Kahuna lāʻau lapaʻau are known as the experts in lāʻau lapaʻau. In order to become a kahuna lāʻau lapaʻau, one had to study for many decades and practice understanding the different healing properties of the laʻau. Kahuna are trained in complementary skills such as plant selection based on criteria such as taste, smell, color, appearance, and environment. Kahuna follow a general guideline that "the one that upholds themselves is a strong la'au". As a sacred art, kahuna lāʻau lapaʻau seek to ensure that the 'ike or knowledge is properly used for just purposes. The kahuna lāʻau lapaʻau is responsible for gathering, preparing and administering herbs based on the needs of the patient and the healing properties of the herbs / lāʻau. La'au is commonly administered as a poultice, salve, tea, topically, or through direct ingestion.

Spirituality is deeply intertwined with the practice of lāʻau lapaʻau. Pule (prayer) and oli (chant) accompany rituals of gathering and administering la'au. Kahuna lāʻau lapaʻau believe that giving thanks and stating the intention of the plant to heal is essential to the efficacy of the treatment.

Lāʻau lapaʻau is frequently accompanied by other traditional healing methods. These include lomilomi (massage), haha (diagnosis through feel), and ho'oponopono (family counseling). Many practitioners of traditional Hawaiian medicine today employ a combination of healing techniques to holistically treat their patients.

Examples of the most common lāʻau used for healing include:

Known Healing Lāʻau
| Hawaiian Name | Scientific name | Healing Purpose | Image |
|---|---|---|---|
| 'Awa (Kava) | Piper methysticum | Used to treat tiredness, chills, latent childhood disease, kidney disorders, headaches, anxiety, and insomnia. | 'Awa |
| 'Awapuhi Kuahiwi | Zingiber zerumbet | Used to treat toothache, sprains, stomachache, achy joints, ringworm, and other skin diseases. | 'Awapuhi |
| Hala | Pandanus tectorius | Different parts of the plant can be used to treat different disorders such as thrush, skin disorders, and constipation. | Hala |
| Kukui | Aleurites molucana | Used to treat constipation, upper respiratory tract infections, sores and external ulcers. | Kukui |
| Māmaki | Pipturus albidus | Thrush, high blood pressure, laxative, and antiviral. | Māmaki |
| Naupaka | Scaevola taccada | Sunburn and pain relief. | Naupaka |
| Noni | Morinda citrifolia | Used to treat kidney stones, high blood pressure, skin infections, diabetes, and bowel problems. | Noni fruit |
| 'Ōlena (turmeric) | Curcuma longa | Anti-inflammatory, ear infections, and high blood pressure. | 'Õlena |
| Pōpolo | Solanum sandwicense | Used to treat respiratory tract disorders, skin disorders, and healing agent for cuts and wounds. | Põpolo |
| 'Uhaloa | Waltheria indica | Upper respiratory infections and asthma. | 'Uhaloa |

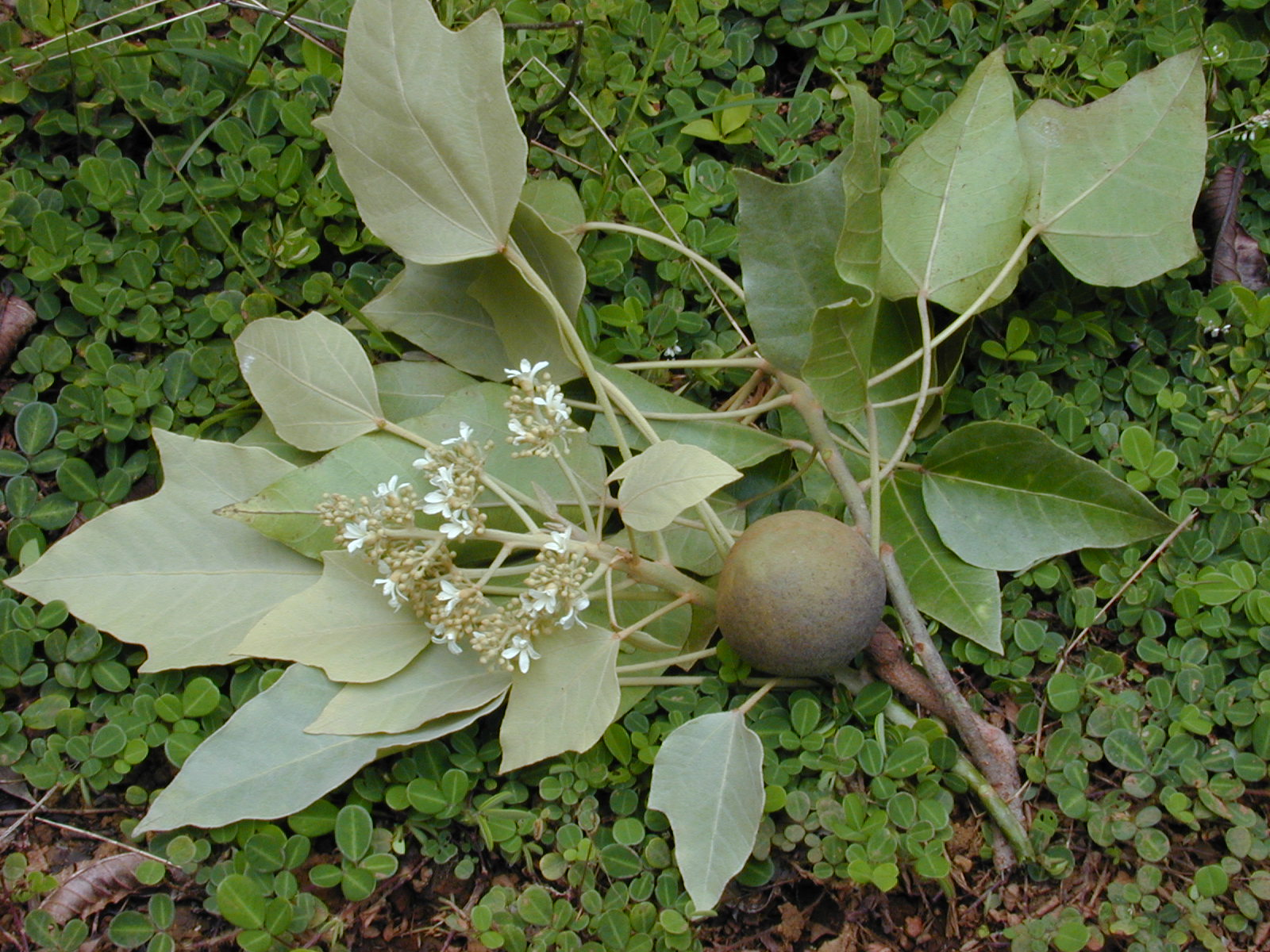
Kukui (Aleurites molucana)

Research exploring the biological parallels between commonly used lā'au and Western prescriptions is growing to legitimize and foster connections between the two medicinal methodologies. For example, the kukui has exhibited anti-bacterial properties for S. aureus and is used to treat associated disease such as pneumonia. There are also many parallels to lā'au lapa'au in other Polynesian cultures.

== Modern practices of lā'au lapa'au ==
Following the Hawaiian Cultural Renaissance of the 1970s, Native Hawaiians were impassioned to reclaim their identity and revitalize traditional arts. Accompanying an increase in the usage of 'Olelo Hawaiʻi (Native Hawaiian) was an increase in visibility for Native Hawaiian healers practicing lā'au lapa'au. Contemporary revitalization efforts have worked to bridge gaps in healthcare accessibility for the Native Hawaiian population that continues to face higher rates of mortality, cardiovascular disease, diabetes, and other diseases comparative to the national average.

=== Integrative care in healthcare systems ===
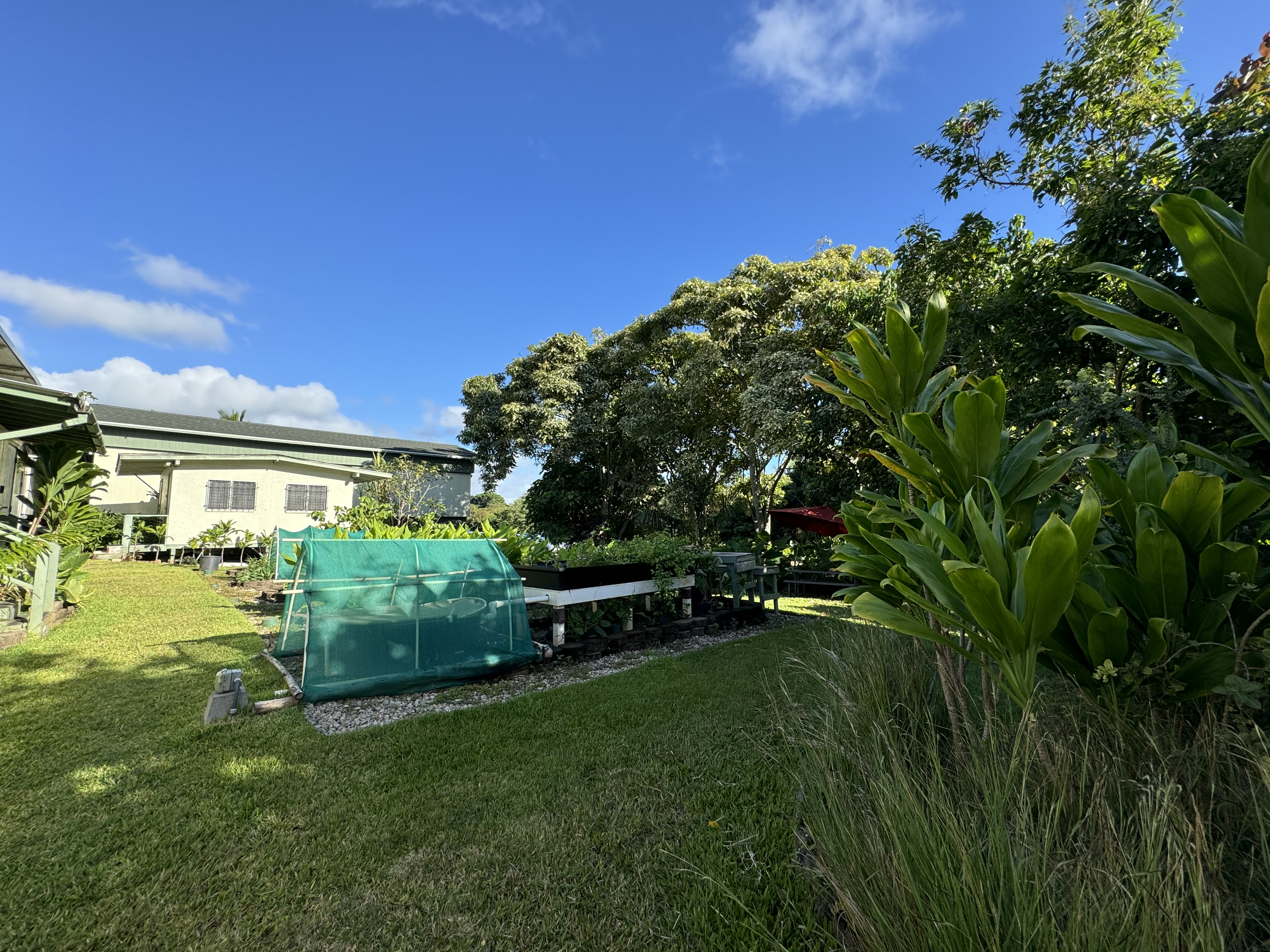
The māla (garden) at the Waimānalo Health Center where la'au is gathered for use at the Cultural Health Department for contemporary practitioners.

While Western medicine remains more mainstream and accessible to Native Hawaiians in modern Hawaiʻi, health clinics and organizations have begun to employ an integrative approach that combines lā'au lapa'au with Western Primary Care. This system relies on collaboration between a physician and traditional healer to cultivate trust and culturally-competent care. For example, Waimānalo Health Center, a clinic that serves primarily Native Hawaiian patients, utilizes the integrative care approach in its health services. Ma'iola Services is a cultural health program established by Waimānalo Health Center that combines traditional healing such as lā'au lapa'au, lomilomi, and ho'oponopono with standard primary care. As of 2023, Lomilomi massage is now covered by AlohaCare Insurance. Studies regarding this program have found a correlation between offering integrated services and heightened patient satisfaction, sense of belonging, as well as decreased levels of chronic illness. Other related studies have found that patients receiving care in the integrative care model reported positive views towards their kahuna lā'au lapa'au as well as greater comfortability in the non-invasive, long-term approaches of lā'au lapa'au administration. Scholars also suggest that lā'au lapa'au shows promising potential in physical therapy services as it follows similar values of preventative care aimed to promote long-term health.

=== Education ===
In the wake of the Native Hawaiian Healthcare Act of 1988, traditional epistemologies such as lā'au lapa'au began to emerge in higher education spaces. In 1990, the John A. Burns School of Medicine began to offer courses in Native Hawaiian cultural competence in medicine and officially founded their Department of Native Hawaiian Health in 2003. Today, students can learn about lā'au lapa'au at the University of Hawaiʻi Community College System and the University of French Polynesia. Students engaging in this coursework can go on to earn certificate credentials of varying levels.

=== Community approaches ===
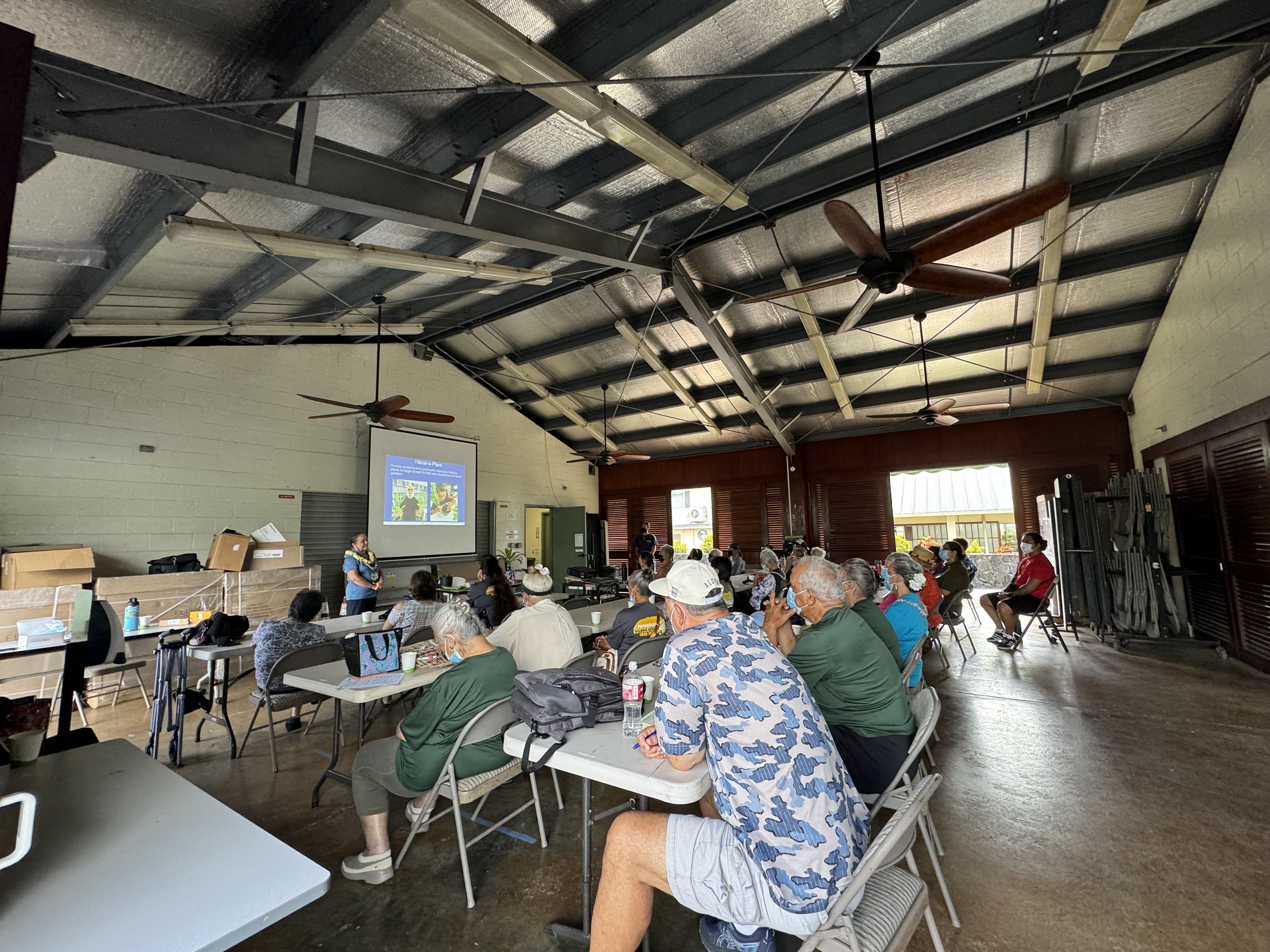
A community course for kūpuna (elderly) taught by a kumu lā'au lapa'au. (2024)

The lā'au or herbs used in practice have evolved over the years as kahuna have had to adapt to a changing environmental landscape. Many commonly used la'au are not endemic to the Hawaiian islands and originate as canoe plants. The privatization of property alongside urban infrastructure have limited resources of la'au that can be gathered for healing purposes. However, engaging the Native Hawaiian community through workshops and education helps to ensure the future of the healing art of lā'au lap'au. Patients who learn to utilize lā'au lap'au long-term have shown to grow and harvest lā'au of their own, cultivating resources available for generations to come.
