= Bernice Akamine =

American artist and Hawaiian rights activist

- Born: December 1, 1949; Honolulu
- Died: June 14, 2024
- Education: University of Hawaiʻi at Mānoa, Central Washington University
- Occupation: Visual artist

Bernice Ann Keolamauloaonalani Akamine (née Bernice Ann Keolamauloaonalani Miyamoto; born December 1, 1949 – June 14, 2024) was an American Native Hawaiian traditional artist and Hawaiian rights activist. Her visual art has taken multiple forms, including glass and featherwork, and she taught traditional Hawaiian art techniques such as the creation of kapa cloth and natural dyeing using Hawaiian plants. Akamine was an advocate for Indigenous land rights, using her artwork to bring attention to the colonial invasion of Hawaiʻi and its continued effects on the native Hawaiian population.

== Early life and education ==
Bernice Ann Keolamauloaonalani (Miyamoto) Akamine was born in Honolulu, Hawaiʻi, on December 1, 1949. Her heritage is kānaka maoli (Native Hawaiian) and Japanese American. Akamine's grandmother was a kahuna lāʻau lapaʻau, a traditional Hawaiian healer, and her mother, Audrey Elliott, was a lauhala weaver.

Akamine earned two degrees from the University of Hawaiʻi at Mānoa: a Bachelor of Fine Arts degree in glass in 1994 and a Master of Fine Arts degree in sculpture and glass in 1999. She studied multiple traditional Hawaiian art forms at the university, such as lei hulu (feather lei) and lauhala weaving. She also completed graduate work at Central Washington University in natural resource management.

Bernice died on June 14, 2024 in Kailua, Hawaiʻi at the age of 74.

== Artwork ==
Akamine's artwork focused on environmental and cultural issues, especially the 1893 overthrow of the Hawaiian Kingdom and the ongoing Hawaiian sovereignty movement. She was a kumu (expert teacher) of the methods of creating and using waiho‘olu‘u (natural plant dyes). During a 2005 internship at the Amy B. H. Greenwell Ethnobotanical Garden, she documented the colors created with these dyes, pairing 20 samples of dye with plant photos.

Akamine created kapa, cloth created by beating bark. She was featured in a 2015 documentary, Ka Hana Kapa, along with other kapa makers and has served as a consultant to the Smithsonian Institution, helping them identify the plants that made the kapa colors on items in their collections. She has also created contemporary baskets inspired by traditional symbols of Hawaiian nobility, using the feathers of small birds. Akamine said her art "is meant to make a statement and preserve cultural knowledge."

=== Selected projects ===
- Kalo (2015): large-scale traveling installation featuring 87 individual kalo plants made from pōhaku (stone) and newsprint
- Hinalua’iko’a (2017): suspended and freestanding beaded sculptures inspired by traditional Hawaiian fish traps, oceanic forms, and Kumulipo, the Hawaiian creation chant
- Papahanaumoku (2018): mixed media pieces of glass and used bullet casing created in response to the 2018 Hawaii false missile alert
- Ku‘u One Hānau (2019): five tents made with the Hawaiian flag drawing attention to homelessness within the kānaka maoli (Native Hawaiian) population

== Awards and fellowships ==
- Pilchuck Partners Scholarship to Pilchuck Glass School, 1995
- Native Arts Research Fellowship, Smithsonian National Museum of the American Indian, 1999
- Community Scholar Award, Smithsonian National Museum of Natural History, 2012
- Native Hawaiian Artist Fellowship, Native Arts and Cultures Foundation, 2015
