= Makana Risser Chai =

R. Makana Risser Chai (born Rita M. Risser) is a speaker, researcher and author of books and articles on stress management, employment law, and Hawaiian traditions including massage or lomilomi.

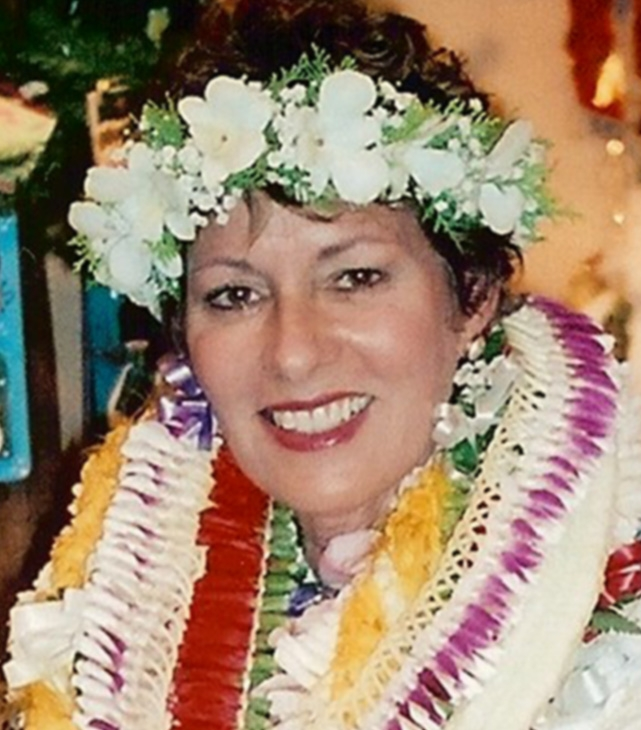
Makana Risser Chai

Na Mo'olelo Lomilomi: Traditions of Hawaiian Massage and Healing (Bishop Museum Press, 2005) is the first book on lomilomi to be published by a major publisher. It is a documentary history compiling published accounts of lomilomi since 1779, and unpublished oral histories from native healers collected from 1867 to the 1930s.

Hawaiian Massage Lomilomi: Sacred Touch of Aloha (Hawaiian Insights, 2007) received a 2008 Keep It Hawai'i award from the Hawai'i Tourism Authority for its authentic portrayal of Hawaiian cultural traditions. It is a photographic book with more than 100 pictures of historic and contemporary practitioners, coupled with inspirational quotes about the elements of lomilomi including love of the land, prayer, breath, forgiveness (ho'oponopono), and loving touch. The photographer is Emmy Award-winner John C. Kalani Zak.

Chai is the co-author, with kumu or teacher Dane Kaohelani Silva, of the chapter on lomilomi from the Mosby book, Massage Modalities (Elsevier Press, 2008).

She authored "Huna, Max Freedom Long and the Idealization of William Brigham" for the peer-reviewed Hawaiian Journal of History, detailing the evidence that Long did not meet Brigham, who he cited as his primary resource for his Huna books, and that even if they did meet, Brigham was not a reliable source on Hawaiian religion or spiritual traditions.

Prentice Hall published Chai's book, Stay Out of Court! The Manager's Guide to Preventing Employee Lawsuits. A certified stress and wellness consultant with the Canadian Institute of Stress, she also authored. Mindful Multitasking: Timeless Techniques for a Vibrant Mind, Strong Body, Happy Heart, and Light Spirit (2018)

She graduated from the University of California Berkeley, AB with honors, 1975, and Juris Doctor, 1978. From 1980 to 1990 she was the sole proprietor of Employment Rights Attorneys in San Jose, California, and from 1990 to 2006 the CEO of the Silicon Valley training company, Fair Measures.
