= Morrnah Simeona =

American healer (1913–1992)

Morrnah Nalamaku Simeona (May 19, 1913 – February 11, 1992) was recognized as a kahuna lapaʻau (healer) in Hawaiʻi and taught her updated version of hoʻoponopono throughout the United States, Asia, and Europe.

== Kahuna lapaʻau ==
Morrnah was born May 19, 1913, in Honolulu, Hawaii, to Kimokeo and Lilia Simeona, both native Hawaiians. Her mother, Lilia, was one of the last recognized kahuna laʻau kahea or priest who heals with words. Morrnah was a practitioner of lomilomi massage and for 10 years owned and operated health spas at the Kahala Hilton and Royal Hawaiian hotels. Among her massage clients at the Hilton spa were Lyndon B. Johnson, Jackie Kennedy, and Arnold Palmer. In 1983, she was recognized as a kahuna lapaʻau (healer) and honored as a "Living Treasure of Hawai'i" by the Honpa Hongwanji Mission of Hawai'i.

== Hoʻoponopono ==
In 1976 she began to modify the traditional Hawaiian forgiveness and reconciliation process of hoʻoponopono to the realities of the modern day. Her version of hoʻoponopono was influenced by her Christian (Protestant and Catholic) education and her philosophical studies about India, China, and Edgar Cayce. The combination of Hawaiian traditions, praying to the Divine Creator, and connecting problems with Reincarnation and Karma resulted in a unique new problem solving process, that was self-help rather than the traditional Hawaiian group process. She had no qualms about adapting traditional concepts to contemporary applications, though she was criticized by some Hawaiian purists. "Her system uses hoʻoponopono techniques to create a working partnership among the three parts of the mind or self, which she calls by Hawaiian names, as well as by the terms subconscious, conscious, and superconscious."

She presented trainings and lectures on hoʻoponopono to the United Nations, in nearly a dozen states in the U.S., and in more than 14 countries, among them Germany, the Netherlands, Switzerland, France, Russia, and Japan. She presented to schools of higher learning, such as the University of Hawaiʻi and Johns Hopkins University, to medical facilities, religious institutions and business organizations. In 1982 she organized the First World Symposium of Identity of Man. A reporter noted: "There was something very calming and soothing about Simeona's presence and her voice, a sense of serenity about her, as she talks about teaching people how to relieve stress and attain peace of mind."

To spread her hoʻoponopono process, she founded Pacifica Seminars in the 1970s and in 1980 The Foundation of ‘I’, Inc. (Freedom of the Cosmos). In 1990, she started Pacifica Seminars in Germany. Simeona wrote three textbooks Self-Identity through Hoʻoponopono, Basic 1 (128 pg), Basic 2 (to use after two years of practicing) and Basic 3 (to use after five years). The recommended waiting times for Basic 2 and 3 was for developing deep respect for the "Divine presence." In 1990, the English original of Basic 1, 8th edition, was officially translated and printed in German and French.

In late fall 1990, her last journey for lectures and seminars took her through Europe to Jerusalem. On January 16, 1991, she came back to Germany, where she lived quietly at a friend's house in Kirchheim, near Munich, until her death on February 11, 1992.

== Statue of Freedom ==
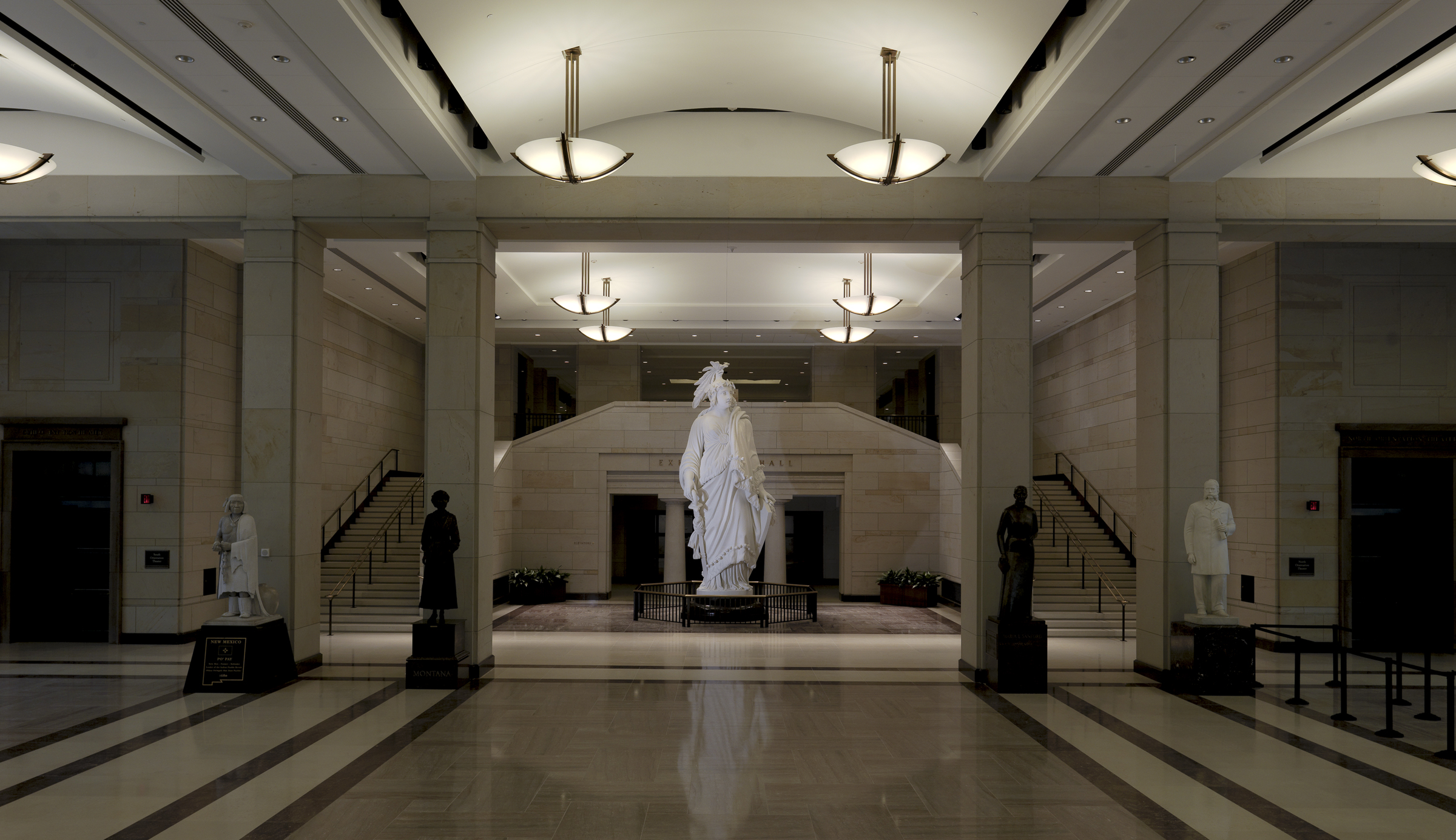
Statue of Freedom's plaster model cast now resides in the Capitol Visitor Center

On March 25, 1992, U. S. Senator Daniel Akaka (D - Hawaii), eulogized Simeona in the Congressional Record. He noted she had learned that the original plaster cast of the cast-iron Statue of Freedom, which stands on the top of the dome of the United States Capitol, was being kept in storage. She raised $25,000 to refurbish and restore it, and as a result it was moved and placed on display in the Russell Senate Office Building (now in the Capitol Visitor Center) where, Akaka said, it would serve as a remembrance of Simeona.
