= Pono (word) =

Hawaiian word commonly rendered as "righteousness"

Pono (pronounced [ˈpono]) is a Hawaiian word commonly rendered as "righteousness". For instance, the Hawaii state motto: Ua Mau ke Ea o ka ʻĀina i ka Pono or "The sovereignty of the land is perpetuated in righteousness".

Pono is a notably polysemous term. Mary Kawena Pukui's and Samuel Hoyt Elbert's Hawaiian dictionary gives six meanings and 83 English translation equivalents.

1. nvs. Goodness, uprightness, morality, moral qualities, correct or proper procedure, excellence, well-being, prosperity, welfare, benefit, behalf, equity, sake, true condition or nature, duty; moral, fitting, proper, righteous, right, upright, just, virtuous, fair, beneficial, successful, in perfect order, accurate, correct, eased, relieved; should, ought, must, necessary.
2. vs. Completely, properly, rightly, well, exactly, carefully, satisfactorily, much (an intensifier).
3. n. Property, resources, assets, fortune, belongings, equipment, household goods, furniture, gear of any kind, possessions, accessories, necessities.
4. n. Use, purpose, plan.
5. n. Hope.
6. vs. Careless, informal, improper, any kind of (preceding a stem).

Here are some examples of how pono can be used in different contexts:

- Mai pono hana ʻoe, akā e hana pono – Don’t work carelessly; instead, work carefully and correctly.
- Ponoʻai – To eat in any way or anything available; taking potluck.
- Ponohana – To work in any manner that suits oneself.
- Pononō i ka noho – Living in an unstructured or careless way; shiftless.
- Pono lole – Any kind of clothing, without specific selection.

The word has strong cultural and spiritual connotations of "a state of harmony or balance", and is the aim of the Hoʻoponopono practice. Pono is often used as in affirmative prayers, especially within Kanaka Maoli healing arts and the Hawaiian Sovereignty Movement.
