= Georgian folk medicine =

Georgian folk medicine (or Georgian traditional medicine) originated at the crossroads of the East and West and therefore integrates the principles of both medical traditions. On a scale between tribal level folk medicine and highly institutionalized Ayurveda, Chinese and Unani traditional medicines, Georgian traditional medicine ranks closer to the better institutionalized and formalized end of the scale. Some ancient Georgian folk remedies made it to the modern formulations and are commercially distributed in the form of modern drugs, mostly petrolatum-based ointments.

== Background ==
Anthropological data suggest that Paleolithic Cro-Magnon people that dwelt on the territory of modern western Georgia may have known of some sort of primitive ointment made from animal brains mixed with fat. Classical Greek mythology suggests that ancient Kolkhs (Colchis people) had practiced somewhat highly developed medicine that must have impressed the Mycenaean Greek (Minyan) travelers at the time. Some historians of medicine suggest that the modern medical scientific principle "Contraria contrariis curantur" (opposite cures the opposite) dates back to ancient Kolkhs and their healer and sorceress princess Medea, acquiring its final form in the classical Greek and eventually in the modern medicine. Georgian popular tradition even attributes the origins of the term Medicine solely to Medea's name. In fact, the term likely stems from the Indo-European root MA and MAD, “and its more familiar hypothetical form MED, meaning to think or to reflect, to give a consideration or care to”. Still, a possible relation between the name of Medea and the term Medicine cannot be decisively denied.

== History ==
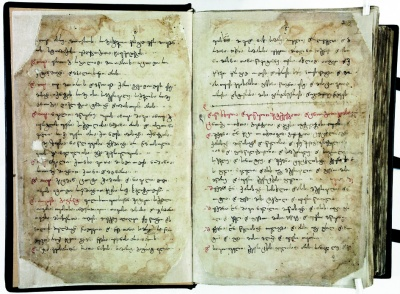
"Karabadini" - the 15th-century Georgian medical Almanac by Zaza Panaskerteli-Tsitsishvili

Beginning of the recorded history of Georgian traditional medicine should be related to the first almanac of medical remedies and medical knowledge written in the 11th century, known as “Ustsoro Karabadini” (Georgian: უსწორო კარაბადინი). After that, different compilations thereof, as well as original fundamental works, all mostly under similar titles (with the exception of the influential 16th-century medical encyclopedia titled "Iadigar Daudi" - Georgian: იადიგარ დაუდი, and a few more), were published once or twice every 100 years until the end of the 19th century. These works, along with the unique local remedies, also include knowledge influenced by the ancient Greek, Byzantine, and Central Asian and Middle East medical traditions.

The highly developed feudal social structure of Medieval Georgia led to the emergence of traditional Georgian medical families (not too unlike the better known Irish medical families), one of which, the Turmanidze family (Georgian: თურმანიძეები) is first mentioned in historical documents somewhere on the turn of the 10th and 11th centuries. So great was the clout of the bearers of Turmanidze family traditions even in the twentieth century that some representatives of the family who lacked any formal education were nevertheless granted medical licenses by the Soviet officials, who were generally very adamant about disallowing traditional medicine methods in the official Soviet medicine.

== See also ==
- Traditional medicine
- Alternative medicine
- Folk medicine
- Georgian people
