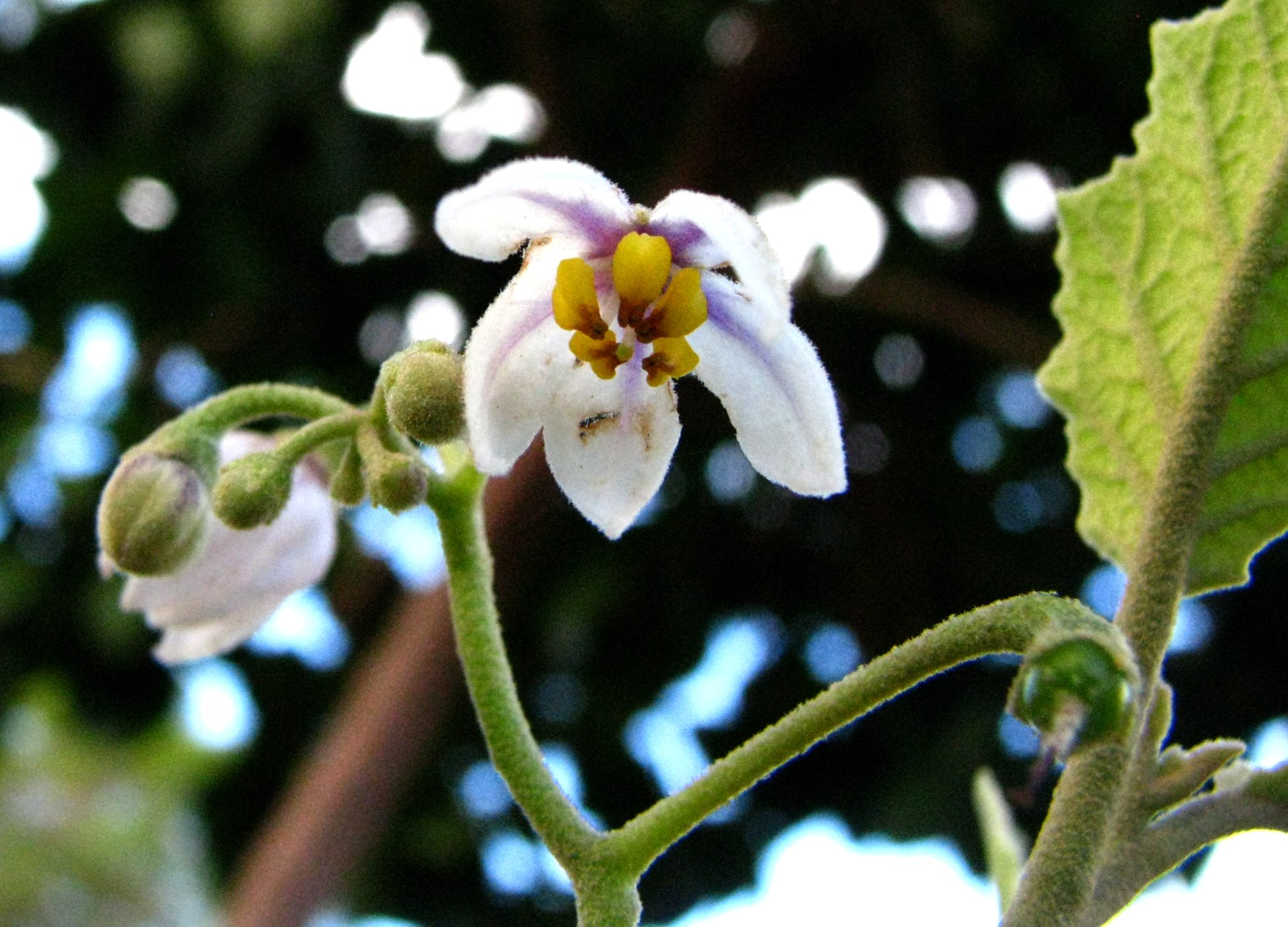

Conservation status
- Critically Imperiled (NatureServe)

Scientific classification
- Kingdom: Plantae
- Clade: Tracheophytes
- Clade: Angiosperms
- Clade: Eudicots
- Clade: Asterids
- Order: Solanales
- Family: Solanaceae
- Genus: Solanum
- Species: S. sandwicense

Binomial name
- Solanum sandwicense Hook. & Arn.

= Solanum sandwicense =

Species of flowering plant

Solanum sandwicense is a rare species of flowering plant in the nightshade family known by the common names Hawai'i horsenettle and popolo 'aiakeakua. It is endemic to Hawaii, where it occurs today on the islands of Kauai and Oahu. It is threatened by the destruction and degradation of its habitat. It is a federally listed endangered species of the United States.

This plant is a shrub growing up to 5 meters tall with a stem up to 15 centimeters in diameter. It is coated in yellow-brown hairs. The leaves are oval, sometimes lobed, and measure up to 15 centimeters long by 14 wide. The inflorescence is an array of flowers each 2 to 2.5 centimeters in diameter. They are purple-tinged white in color and have yellow anthers. The fruit is a juicy black spherical berry just over a centimeter wide.

The species is extirpated from Hawaii. The last wild individual on Oahu died in the 1990s. Its seeds have been used to propagate more plants which were then outplanted in appropriate habitat. There are no more than 20 individuals remaining on Kauai.

The plant is threatened by feral pigs, feral goats, and mule deer. It is eaten by rats and slugs. The invasion of introduced species of plants such as Kalanchoe pinnata (air plant) and Passiflora tarminiana (banana poka) degrades the habitat.
