= Hoʻoponopono =

Traditional Hawaiian practice of reconciliation and forgiveness

Hoʻoponopono (Hawaiian pronunciation: [ho.ʔo.po.no.po.no]) is a traditional Hawaiian practice of reconciliation and forgiveness. The Hawaiian word translates into English simply as correction, with the synonyms manage or supervise. Similar forgiveness practices are performed on islands throughout the South Pacific, including Hawaii, Samoa, Tahiti and New Zealand. Traditional hoʻoponopono is practiced by Indigenous Hawaiian healers, often within the extended family by a family member.

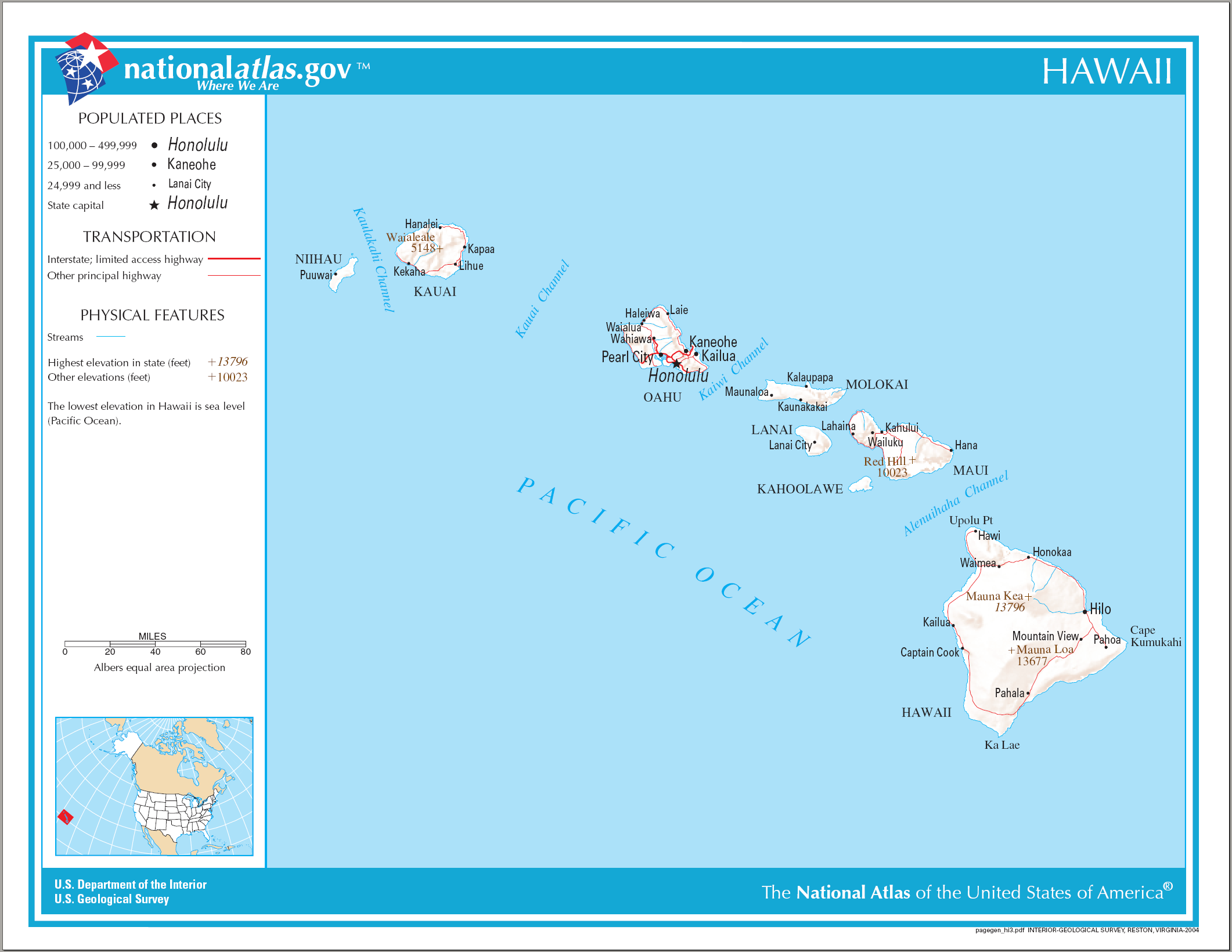
Map of Hawaii

== Polynesian antecedents ==
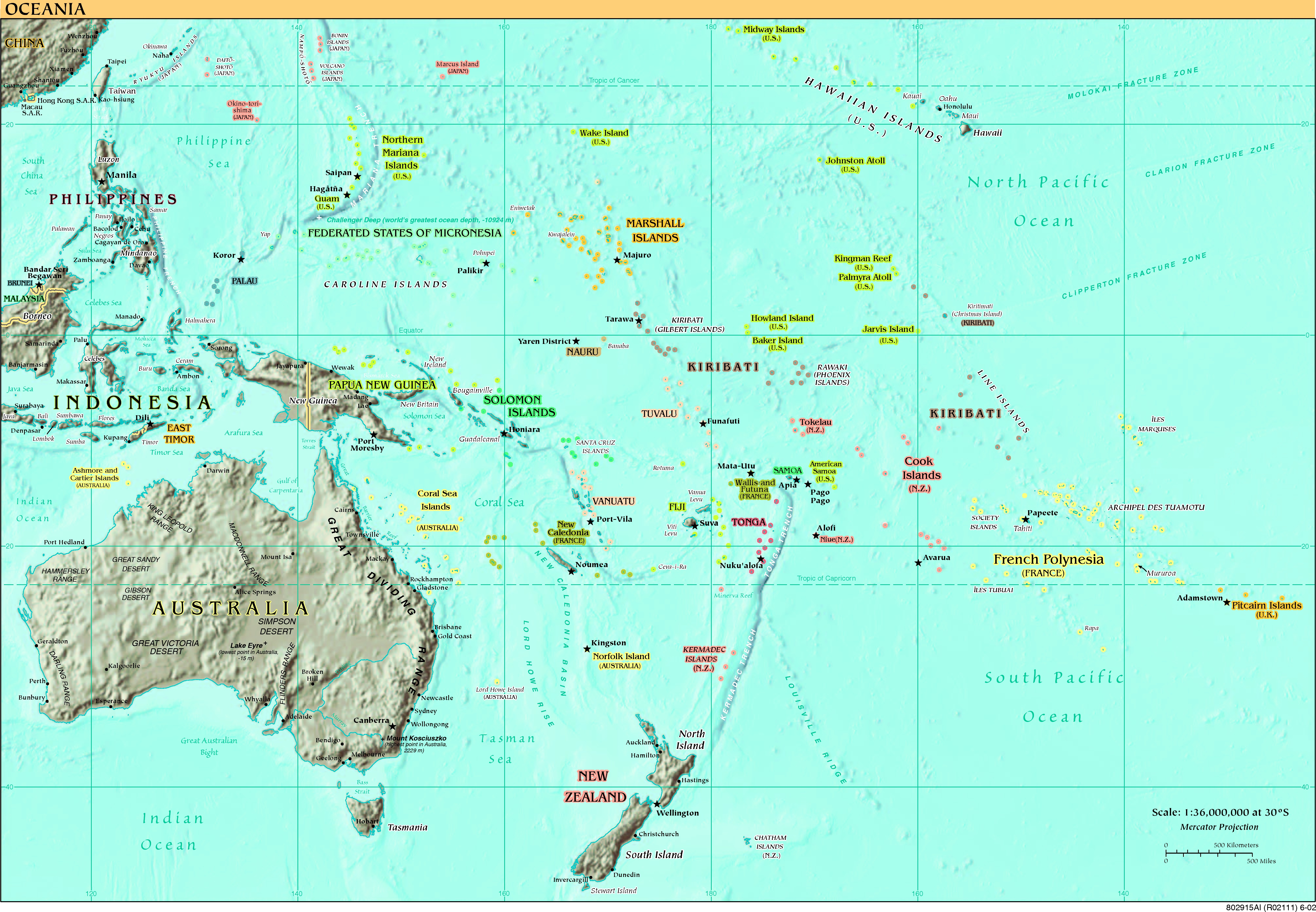
Map of Oceania

In many Polynesian cultures, it is believed that a person's errors (called hara or hala) caused illness. Some believe error angers the gods, others that it attracts malevolent gods, and still others believe the guilt caused by error makes one sick. "In most cases, however, specific 'untie-error' rites could be performed to atone for such errors and thereby diminish one's accumulation of them."

Among the islands of Vanuatu in the South Pacific, people believe that illness usually is caused by sexual misconduct or anger. "If you are angry for two or three days, sickness will come," said one local man. The therapy that counters this sickness is confession. The patient, or a family member, may confess. If no one confesses an error, the patient may die. The Vanuatu people believe that secrecy is what gives power to the illness. When the error is confessed, it no longer has power over the person.

Like many other islanders, including Hawaiians, people of Tikopia in the Solomon Islands, and on Rarotonga in the Cook Islands, believe that the sins of the father will fall upon the children. If a child is sick, the parents are suspected of quarreling or misconduct. In addition to sickness, social disorder could cause sterility of land or other disasters. Harmony could be restored only by confession and apology.

In Pukapuka, it was customary to hold sort of a confessional over patients to determine an appropriate course of action in order to heal them.

Similar traditions are found in Samoa, Tahiti, and among the Maori of New Zealand.

== Etymology ==
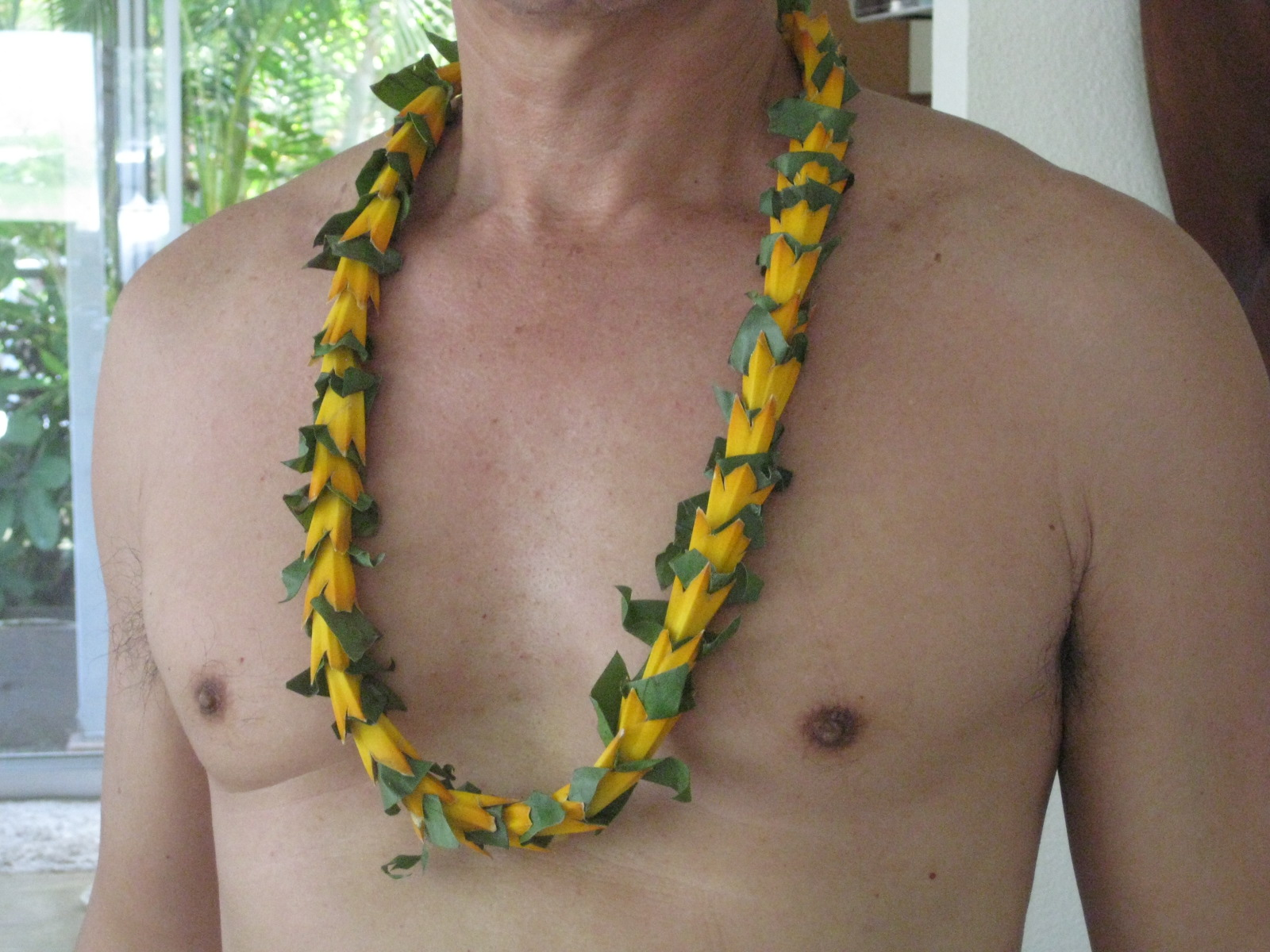
A lei made from the fruit of the hala or pandanus tree. A hala lei was given at the completion of hoʻoponopono in the tradition of kahuna Makaweliweli of Molokai.

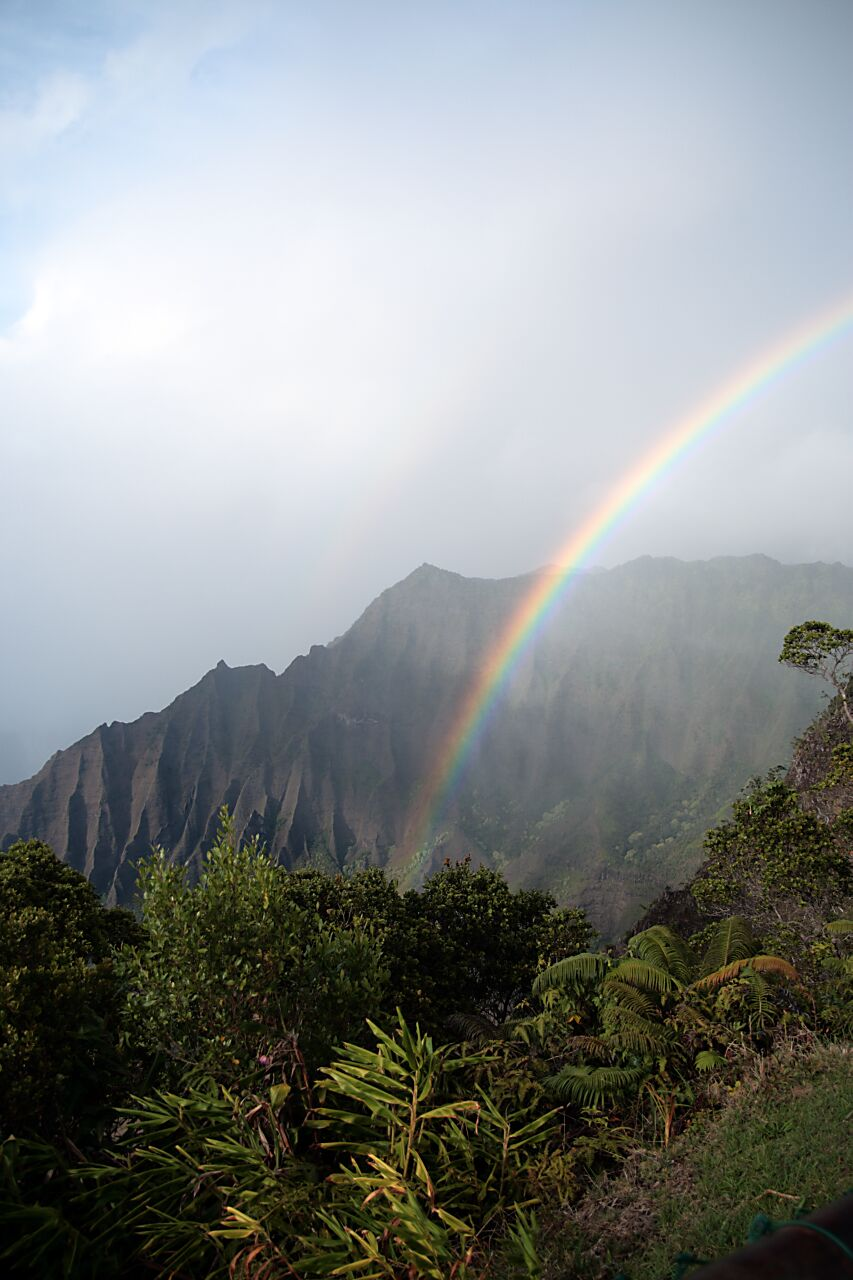
Overlooking Kalalau Valley from Koke'e State Park, where Nana Veary held retreats to teach hoʻoponopono

Hoʻoponopono is defined in the Hawaiian Dictionary as:

(a) "To put to rights; to put in order or shape, correct, revise, adjust, amend, regulate, arrange, rectify, tidy up make orderly or neat, administer, superintend, supervise, manage, edit, work carefully or neatly; to make ready, as canoemen preparing to catch a wave."

(b) "Mental cleansing: family conferences in which relationships were set right (hoʻoponopono) through prayer, discussion, confession, repentance, and mutual restitution and forgiveness."

Literally, hoʻo is a particle used to make an actualizing verb from the following noun. Here, it creates a verb from the noun pono, which is defined as: "...goodness, uprightness, morality, moral qualities, correct or proper procedure, excellence, well-being, prosperity, welfare, benefit, true condition or nature, duty; moral, fitting, proper, righteous, right, upright, just, virtuous, fair, beneficial, successful, in perfect order, accurate, correct, eased, relieved; should, ought, must, necessary."

Ponopono is defined as "to put to rights; to put in order or shape, correct, revise, adjust, amend, regulate, arrange, rectify, tidy up, make orderly or neat." Therefore, hoʻoponopono can be translated literally as "to make right" or "to make good".

== Traditional practice ==
Hawaiian scholar Nana Veary in her book Change We Must: My Spiritual Journey wrote that hoʻoponopono was a practice in Ancient Hawaii and this is supported by oral histories from contemporary Hawaiian elders. Pukui (born 1895) first recorded her experiences and observations from her childhood in her 1958 book.

Although the word hoʻoponopono was not used, early Hawaiian historians documented a belief that illness was caused by breaking kapu, or spiritual laws, and that the illness could not be cured until the sufferer atoned for this transgression, often with the assistance of a praying priest (kahuna pule) or healing priest (kahuna lapaʻau). Forgiveness was sought from the gods or from the person with whom there was a dispute.

Pukui described it as a practice of extended family members meeting to "make right" broken family relations. Some families met daily or weekly, to prevent problems from erupting. Others met when a person became ill, believing that illness was caused by the stress of anger, guilt, recriminations and lack of forgiveness. Kupuna Nana Veary wrote that when any of the children in her family fell ill, her grandmother would ask the parents, "What have you done?" They believed that healing could come only with complete forgiveness of the whole family.

== Ritual ==
The aim of Hoʻoponopono is to correct, restore and maintain good relationships among family members and with their god(s) by getting to the causes and sources of trouble. It is usually conducted by the most senior family member, who gathers the family together. If the family is unable to work through a problem, they turn to a respected outsider.

The process begins with prayer. A statement of the problem is made, and the transgression discussed. Family members are expected to work problems through and cooperate, and not "hold fast to the fault". One or more periods of silence may be taken for reflection on the entanglement of emotions and injuries. Each person's feelings are acknowledged. Then confession, repentance and forgiveness take place. Everyone releases (kala) each other, letting go. They cut off the past (ʻoki), and together they close the event with a ceremonial feast, called pani, which often included eating limu kala, symbolic of the release.

In a form used by the family of kahuna Makaweliweli of the island of Molokai, the completion of hoʻoponopono is represented by giving the person forgiven a lei made from the fruit of the hala tree.

Many consider the spirit of aloha to be central to the practice of hoʻoponopono.

At a University of Hawai‘i–West O‘ahu event exploring hoʻoponopono, Dr. Manu Aluli Meyer remarked that, "We are healing our collective with aloha languaging".

== Modern uses ==
"Aunty" Malia Craver, who worked with the Queen Liliʻuokalani Children's Centers (QLCC) for more than 30 years, taught courses in traditional hoʻoponopono. On August 30, 2000, she spoke about it to the United Nations.

=== Traditional applications ===
In the late 20th century, courts in Hawaiʻi began to order juvenile and adult offenders to work with an elder who would conduct hoʻoponopono for their families, as a form of alternative dispute resolution. The hoʻoponopono is conducted in the traditional way, without court interference, with a practitioner picked by the family from a list of court-approved providers.

Some native practitioners provide hoʻoponopono to clients who otherwise might seek family counseling.

=== Freedom from karma ===
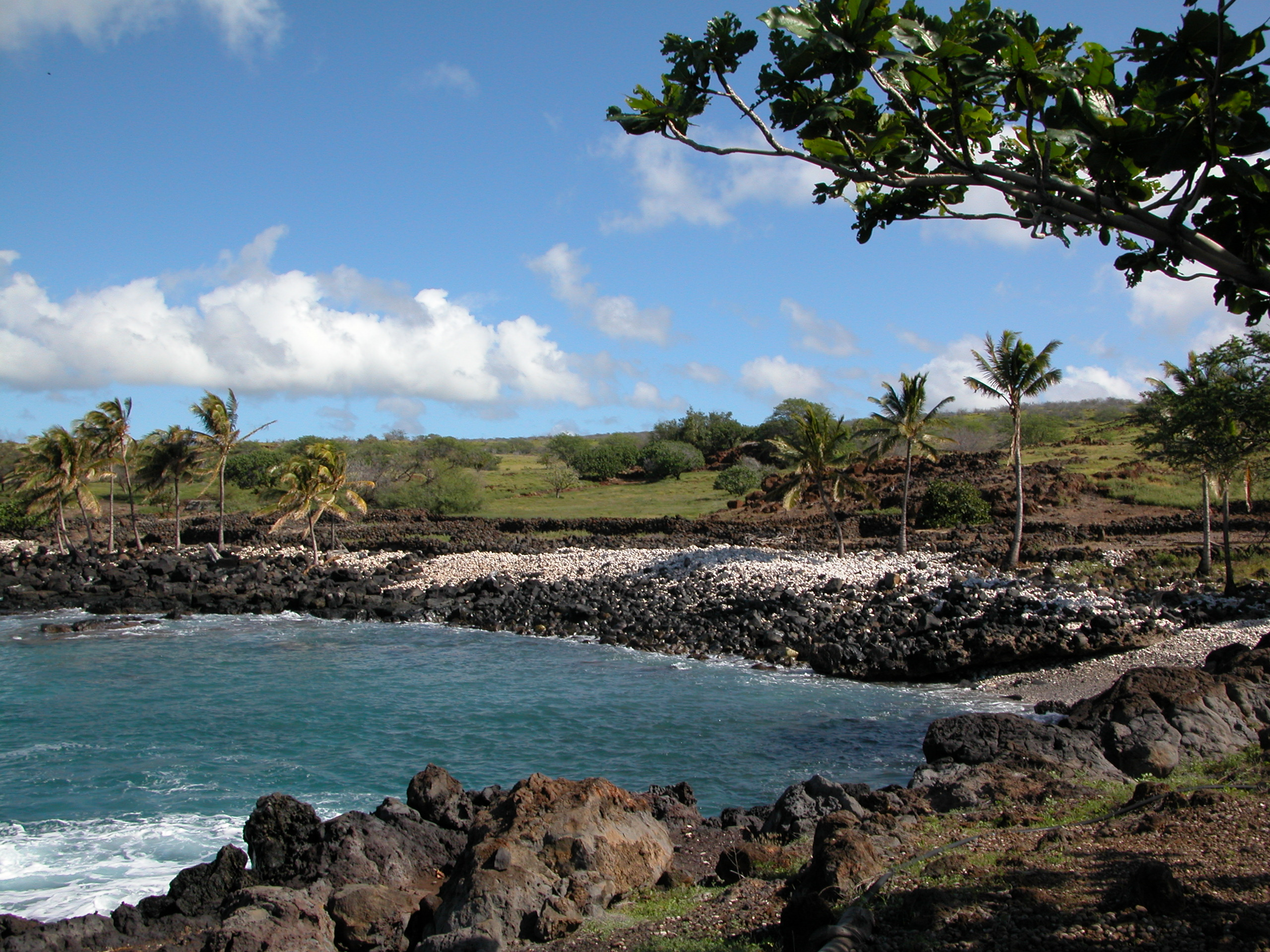
The site of the partially restored remains of the village of Koaiʻe in the Lapakahi State Historical Park of the island of Hawaii, North Kohala district. Beginning in the early 20th century, this village has been a center for lapaʻau.

In 1976 Morrnah Simeona, regarded as a healing priest or kahuna lapaʻau, adapted the traditional hoʻoponopono of family mutual forgiveness to the social realities of the modern day. For this she extended it both to a general problem solving process outside the family and to a psycho-spiritual self-help rather than group process.

Simeona's version is influenced by her Christian (Protestant and Catholic) education and her philosophical studies about India, China and Edgar Cayce. Like Hawaiian tradition she emphasizes prayer, confession, repentance, and mutual restitution and forgiveness. Unlike Hawaiian tradition, she describes problems only as the effects of negative karma, saying that "you have to experience by yourself what you have done to others." But that you are the creator of your life circumstances was common knowledge for the people of old as "things we had brought with us from other lifetimes." Any wrongdoing is memorized within oneself and mirrored in every entity and object which was present when the cause happened. As the Law of Cause and Effect predominates in all of life and lifetimes, the purpose of her version is mainly "to release unhappy, negative experiences in past reincarnations, and to resolve and remove traumas from the 'memory banks'." Karmic bondages hinder the evolution of mind, so that "(karmic) cleansing is a requisite for the expansion of awareness". Using her 14-step-process would dissolve those bondages. She did not use mantras or conditioning exercises.

Her teachings include: there is a Divine Creator who takes care of altruistic pleas of Men; "when the phrase 'And it is done' is used after a prayer, it means Man's work ends and God's begins." "Self-Identity" signifies, e.g. during the hoʻoponopono, that the three selves or aspects of consciousness are balanced and connected with the Divine Creator. Different from egoistic prayers, "altruistic prayers like hoʻoponopono, where you also pray for the release of other entities and objects, reach the Divine plane or Cosmos because of their high vibrations. From that plane the Divine energy or "mana" would come," which would transform the painful part of the memory of the wrong actions in all participants to "Pure Light", on whatever plane they are existing; "all are set free". Through this transmutation in the mind the problems will lose their energy for physical effects, and healing or balancing is begun. In this sense, Simeona's mana is not the same as the traditional Polynesian understanding of mana.

Pacifica Seminars, founded by Morrnah Simeona, started the first Ho'oponopono seminars in Germany. Seminars are still held on a regular basis in Germany, Poland, France, and Denmark.

=== State of Zero ===
In 1982, psychologist Ihaleakala Hew Len took his first class with Morrnah Simeona. He trained as an instructor under Simeona, and later taught with her traveling in the Americas, Europe, the Middle East, and Asia. After Simeona's death in 1992, Len returned to Hawaii to continue work in Ho'oponopono'. In 2007, Len co-authored a book with Joe Vitale called Zero Limits, referring to Simeona's Hoʻoponopono teachings. Len made no claim to be a kahuna. In contrast to Simeona's teachings, the book introduces the new idea that the main objective of Hoʻoponopono is getting to the "zero state—it's where we have zero limits. No memories. No identity." To reach this state, which Len called 'Self-I-Dentity thru Ho'oponopono', or SITH, includes using the mantra, "I love you. I'm sorry. Please forgive me. Thank you." It is based on Len's idea of 100% responsibility, taking responsibility for everyone's actions, not only for one's own. If one would take complete responsibility for one's life, then everything one sees, hears, tastes, touches, or in any way experiences would be one's responsibility because it is in one's life. The problem would not be with one's external reality, it would be with oneself. Total Responsibility, according to Len, advocates that everything exists as a projection from inside the human being.

== See also ==
- Restorative Justice
- Ifoga
