= Lomilomi massage =

Polynesian massage method

Lomilomi massage is a Polynesian method of kneading massage incorporating elements of indigenous religious beliefs. The word lomilomi comes from the Hawaiian and Samoan languages. Lomi means "to knead.” The smooth flow of the strokes mimic the ocean waves. It may also mean "to take and turn, to shift" as in "the sacred shift within you that is inspired by the healing kahuna," spoken twice for emphasis.

== Traditional practice ==
Lomilomi was made famous around the world by Hawaiian tourism, but is also a traditional practice in the neighbouring Polynesian Islands of Tahiti, French Polynesia, Samoa, and Tokelau.

Practitioners use the palms, forearms, fingers, knuckles, elbows, knees, feet, even sticks and stones. It may be performed with or without emollient. Lomilomi practices vary by family, Ahupuaʻa (traditional region) and island.

Throughout the Islands there is also a spiritual practice where spiritual healers, Kahuna and Shaman use traditional Lomi-Lomi to exorcise spirits (Aiku/Aitu) from possessed individuals.

Traditionally in ancient Hawaii lomilomi was practiced in four contexts:

1. As a healing practice of native healers -- kahuna lāʻau lapaʻau (healers) and kahuna hāhā (diagnosticians)
2. As a luxury and an aid to digestion, especially by the ruling chiefs (aliʻi)
3. As restorative massage within the family
4. By ʻōlohe lua (masters of the Hawaiian martial arts)

Although the term kahuna lomilomi is widely used in contemporary writings, traditionally the people who performed lomilomi were called ka poʻe lomilomi (the massage people) or kanaka lomi (massage person). A related term, kauka lomilomi, was coined in 1920 to describe osteopathic physicians. The word kauka is the Hawaiianized version of doctor.

Future practitioners were selected in childhood, around age 5, based on birth signs such as weather events, birthmarks (especially on the head), and kind behavior. After a decade or more of study, they would begin to practice but mastery was believed to take a lifetime.

Like all endeavors in old Hawaii, lomilomi was conducted with prayer and intention. Hawaiian kupuna (elder) Auntie Margaret Machado describes lomilomi as "praying" work. Emma Akana Omsted, a kupuna or elder of Hana, Maui, in the 1930s, said, "When a treatment is to be given, the one who gives the treatment first plucks the herbs to be used. He prays as he picks the herbs. No one should call him back or distract his attention, all should be as still as possible for they do not want the vibration broken. They knew the laws of vibration. They knew the power of the spoken word. They knew Nature. They gathered the vibration of the plentiful."

== History of lomilomi ==
The early Polynesian settlers brought their own form of massage to Hawai'i and Hawaiian lomilomi evolved their own unique Hawaiian style, whilst neighbouring Polynesian Islands such as Tokelau, Samoa and Tahiti also developed their own forms of Lomilomi being practiced by everyone, from child to chief. As an indigenous practice that evolved over hundreds of years in isolated valleys throughout the island chain, there are many different "schools" of lomilomi with different approaches and techniques.

After American missionaries arrived in 1820 and converted many in the Kingdom of Hawaii to Christianity, various laws prohibited "heathen" worship and any related Native Hawaiian healing practices. Lomilomi as part of medical practice went underground. But lomilomi as restorative massage remained popular not only among the Hawaiians, but among foreign residents and visitors as well. Charles Wilkes describes it being offered after his ascent of Mokuaweoweo in 1841 on the United States Exploring Expedition. For Robert Louis Stevenson it was "disagreeable", but English adventurer Isabella Bird found it delightful. Not only did non-Hawaiians receive lomilomi, they also gave it. According to William Brigham the first Director of the Bishop Museum, writing in 1908, one of the most skilled practitioners was Sanford Dole, one of the leaders of the overthrow of the Kingdom.

Although the Legislature of the Kingdom of Hawaiʻi banned curing through "superstitious methods" in 1886, massage was not subject to legislation until 1945. In 1947, the Board of Massage was established to regulate lomilomi and massage. The law required practitioners to pass a written test on anatomy, physiology and massage theory. Many renowned native healers were unable or unwilling to pass the test, and thus lomilomi as restorative massage was forced underground. In 2001, the Legislature passed Act 304, amending HRS section 453, allowing native practitioners to be certified by the Hawaiian medical board, Papa Ola Lōkahi, or by the various community health centers. This law is controversial among some native practitioners, but those who are certified (but not licensed) can provide lomilomi without fear of prosecution under Hawaii state law.

== Lomilomi today ==
Many traditionally taught lomilomi practitioners find it virtually impossible to offer authentic lomilomi in a spa setting and are unwilling to work in most spas or massage offices. They prefer to treat selected clients quietly and privately, often in home settings. Lomilomi practitioners may also ask their clients to pray, meditate, change their diets, or take other action as part of their health improvement process.{{Citation needed}}

Among some practitioners, music is provided and can be used to choreograph the flow of lomilomi, especially when sounds of surf are in the soundtrack.

Unlike traditional lomilomi kupuna (elder recognized by the Hawaiian community) who require students to study with them for years, some massage schools around the world purport to train therapists in lomilomi in a few hours and some massage therapists may incorporate techniques from other massage modalities during the session. While often pleasant, this style of massage which is now a common and popular massage modality throughout the world, especially in Hawaii, Japan, Europe and Australia, is very different from authentic lomilomi.

== Bibliography ==
- Pukui & Elbert dictionary
- R. Makana Risser Chai, Na Mo'olelo Lomilomi: The Traditions of Hawaiian Massage & Healing, Bishop Museum Press.
- R. Makana Risser Chai, Hawaiian Massage Lomilomi: Sacred Touch of Aloha, Hawaiian Insights.
- Nancy Kahalewai, Hawaiian Lomilomi - Big Island Massage, Island Massage Publishing.
- Robert Noah Calvert, The History of Massage, Healing Arts Press.
- History of Lomilomi, July 2000 issue of Massage Magazine.
- Hawaiian Lomilomi Association
