= Kahuna =

Hawaiian word for expert in a profession

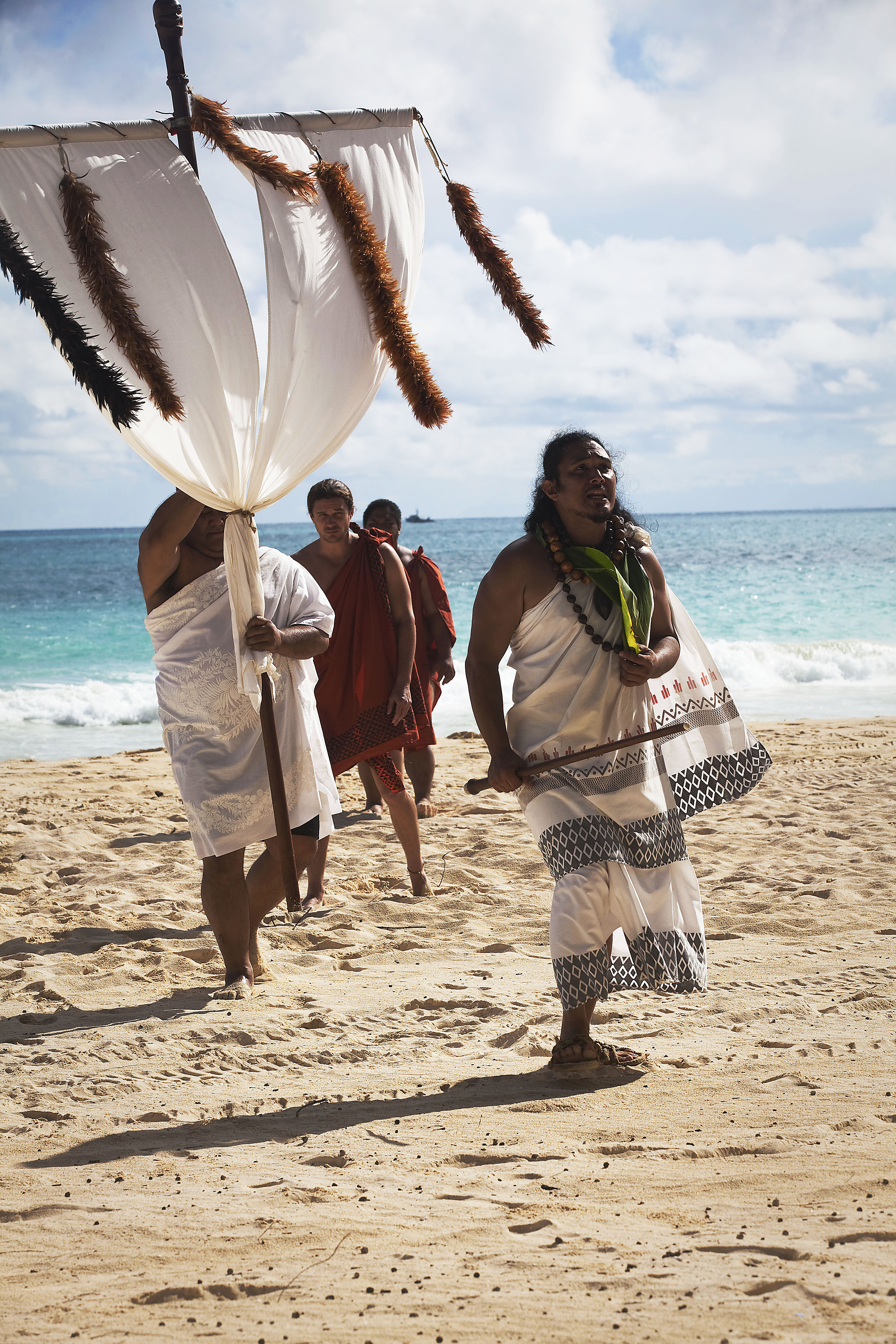
Priest conducting religious ceremony honoring the Hawaiian god Lono in Waimanalo, Hawaii

Kahuna (Hawaiian pronunciation: [kə.ˈhu.nə]; Hawaiian: kahuna) is a Hawaiʻian word that refers to an expert in any field. Historically, it has been used to refer to doctors, surgeons, and dentists, as well as priests, ministers, and sorcerers.

== Background ==
A kahuna may be versed in agriculture, canoe building, or any other skill or knowledge area. The term itself kahuna, literally means "keeper of hidden knowledge". It is derived from the word kahu, meaning "caretaker", and huna, meaning "secret". The secrecy over their knowledge has been described as being similar to the Freemasons and the guild masters of medieval Europe. People who came from outside Hawaii distorted and stereotyped the term as a witch or wizard. They may be called on by the community to bless new buildings and construction projects, or to officiate weddings.

Forty types of kahuna are listed in the book Tales from the Night Rainbow, twenty in the healing professions alone, including kahuna lapaʻau, a medical priest or practitioner, and kahuna hāhā, "an expert who diagnoses, as sickness or pain, by feeling the body".

Some of the classes of kahuna as practiced in pre-contact Hawaii are:

- Kahuna po‘o or Kahuna nui: High priest
- Kahuna kaula: Prophet - Mason Server
- Kahuna wehe wehe: Dream interpreter
- Kahuna kilokilo: Reader of skies and omens
- Kahuna kalai: Carving expert
- Kahuna kalai ki‘i: Sculptor
- Kahuna kalai wa‘a: Canoe maker
- Kahuna hale kukulu: House builder
- Kahuna kumu hula: Leader of a hula halau (hula group)
- Kahuna haku mele ula: Makers of chants and music
- Kahuna ho‘okele: Navigator
- Kahuna kela moku: Expert seaman
- Kahuna ‘upena hana: Expert fishnet maker
- Kahuna lawai‘a kolau: Expert at catching fish with a net
- Kahuna wanana ikeauokamanawa: Reader of weather signs
- Kahuna lawai‘amanu: Expert bird catcher
- Kahuna ka‘a kaua: War strategist
- Kahuna papa po‘o: Leader of the warriors
- Kahuna lawelawe iwi: Cares for the bones of the dead
- Kahuna kukei‘i wana‘ao: Expert story teller
- Kahuna hui: Led functions and ceremonies for the Ali‘i.

A kahuna lapaʻau is a "medical doctor, medical practitioner, [or] healer. lit. 'curing expert'".

=== Kahuna nui ===
According to Fornander, there are ten colleges or branches of the Hawaiian priesthood:

- ʻAnāʻanā, Hoʻopiopio, and Hoʻounāunā were said to practice sorcery, to bring death or injury to others by means of prayer.
- Hoʻokomokomo and Poʻi ʻUhane were said to use spirits for divination and spirit possession.
- Lapaʻau: one who practices medicinal healing.
- Kuhikuhi puʻuone (lit. 'to direct divination'): one who locates the site for the construction of heiau, or temples.
- Kilokilo: one who divines and predicts future events, a prophet.
- Nānāuli: soothsayers, diviners, prophets.

A master of all ten branches could be made a kahuna nui or high priest. Kahuna nui usually lived in places such as Waimea Valley, which is known as the Valley of the Priests. They were given slices of land that spanned from the mountain to the sea. Hewahewa, a direct descendant of Paʻao, was a kahuna nui to Kamehameha I. A contemporary, Leimomi Moʻokini Lum is a kahuna nui. David Kaonohiokala Bray was a well-known kahuna.

King Kamehameha IV, in his translation of the Book of Common Prayer, used the term kahuna to refer to Anglican priests, and kahunapule to refer to both lay and ordained Anglican ministers. Kahunapulē means Gospel preacher in Hawaiian. Pulē in Hawaiian means prayer, spell or blessing.

== Legal status ==
Craft kahuna were never prohibited; however, during the decline of native Hawaiian culture, many died and did not pass on their wisdom to new students. As an example, when the Hōkūleʻa was built to be sailed to the South Pacific to prove the voyaging capabilities of the ancient Hawaiians, master navigator Mau Piailug from Satawal was brought to Hawaii to reteach navigation to the Hawaiians.

After American missionaries went to Hawaii in 1822, they reportedly prohibited kahuna practices. But, in the 100 years after the missionaries arrived, all kahuna practices were legal until 1831, some were illegal until 1863, all were legal until 1887, and some were illegal until 1919. Since 1919 all have been legal except sorcery, which was initially declared illegal but was decriminalized in 1972.

The first Christian missionaries arrived in 1822. Kamehameha I had earlier believed that Christianity may bring mana or heavenly power to revitalise the Hawaiian community. Kaʻahumanu, one of the most powerful people in the Hawaiian realm as Queen regent, was baptised "Elizabeth" in 1825. She formally declared Christianity to be the new state religion with a Sabbath on December 21, 1823. Eleven years after missionaries arrived, she proclaimed laws against hula, chant, kava, and the Hawaiian religion.

== Non-Hawaiian uses ==
The term was used in the 1959 film Gidget, in which "The Big Kahuna", played by Cliff Robertson (Martin Milner in the TV episode), was the leader of a group of surfers. The figure of the Big Kahuna became commonplace in beach party films of the 1960s, such as Beach Blanket Bingo, in which the Big Kahuna was the best surfer on the beach. Hawaiian surfing master Duke Kahanamoku may have been referred to as the Big Kahuna, but he rejected the term as he knew the original meaning.

In the New Age spiritual system known as Huna, which uses some Hawaiian words and concepts appropriated from Hawaiian tradition, kahuna denotes someone of priestly or shamanic standing. The prevalence of these works in pop culture has influenced definitions in English dictionaries, such as Merriam-Webster, which not only defines kahuna as "a preeminent person or thing" but also offers "Hawaiian shaman" as a secondary definition. Wells College professor Lisa Kahaleole Hall, a Native Hawaiian, wrote in a peer-reviewed journal published by the University of Hawaiʻi that Huna "bears absolutely no resemblance to any Hawaiian worldview or spiritual practice" and calls it part of the "New Age spiritual industry."

== See also ==
- Ancient Hawaii
- Lomi Lomi (Kahuna Bodywork)
- Kohala Historical Sites State Monument
- Hoʻoponopono, Hawaiian forgiveness process
- Morrnah Simeona, regarded as a kahuna laʻau lapaʻau
- Tohunga, a cognate term and title in Māori tradition
- Filipino shamans
- Bobohizan, shamans among the Kadazan-Dusun
- Big Kahuna Burger, a fictional Hawaiian-themed fast food restaurant chain that appears in the movies of Quentin Tarantino and Robert Rodriguez
- Guru

== Bibliography ==
- Chai, Makana Risser. Na Mo'olelo Lomilomi: Traditions of Hawaiian Massage & Healing. ISBN 1-58178-046-X.
- Hall, Sandra. Duke: A Great Hawaiian. ISBN 1-57306-230-8.
- Gutmanis, Jane (1976). Kahuna La'au Lapa'au – Hawaiian Herbal Medicine [Medical Kahuna]. Island Heritage (www.islandheritage.com). English. ISBN 0-89610-330-7.
- Kahalewai, Nancy S. Hawaiian Lomilomi – Big Island Massage. ISBN 0-9677253-2-1.
- Kamakau, Samuel. Tales & Traditions of the People of Old. ISBN 0-930897-71-4.
- Kupihea, Moke (2001). Kahuna of Light – The World of Hawaiian Spirituality. Inner Traditions International. ISBN 0-89281-756-9.
- Lee, Pali Jae. Hoʻopono and Tales from the Night Rainbow.
- Malo, David. Hawaiian Antiquities (Moʻolelo Hawaiʻi). Bishop Museum Press. 1951 (1903).
- McBride, Likeke R. The Kahuna: Versatile Masters of Old Hawaiʻi. ISBN 0-912180-51-X.
- Pukui, Mary K.; Haertig, E. W.; Lee, Catharine A. (1980). Nana I Ke Kumu [Look to the Source]. Hui Hanai. ISBN 0-9616738-2-6.
- Pukui, Mary Kawena; Elbert, Samuel H. (1986). Hawaiian Dictionary. Honolulu: University of Hawaii Press. ISBN 0-8248-0703-0.
