= Hawaii =

U.S. state

Hawaii Hawaiʻi (Hawaiian)
- State
- Flag Seal
- Nicknames: The Aloha State (official), Paradise of the Pacific, The Islands of Aloha, The 808 State
- Motto(s): Ua Mau ke Ea o ka ʻĀina i ka Pono ("The Life of the Land Is Perpetuated in Righteousness")
- Anthem: Hawaiʻi Ponoʻī (Hawaiʻi's Own True Sons)
- Location of Hawaii within the United States
- Country: United States
- Before statehood: Territory of Hawaii
- Admitted to the Union: August 21, 1959; 67 years ago (50th)
- Capital (and largest city): Honolulu
- Largest metro and urban areas: Honolulu County

Government
  - Governor: Josh Green (D)
  - Lieutenant Governor: Sylvia Luke (D)
- Legislature: State Legislature
  - Upper house: Senate
  - Lower house: House of Representatives
- Judiciary: Supreme Court of Hawaii
- U.S. senators: Brian Schatz (D); Mazie Hirono (D)
- U.S. House delegation: 1: Ed Case (D); 2: Jill Tokuda (D) (list)

Area
  - Total: 10,931 sq mi (28,311 km^{2})
  - Land: 6,424 sq mi (16,638 km^{2})
  - Water: 4,507 sq mi (11,672 km^{2}) 41.2%
  - Rank: 43rd

Dimensions
  - Length: 1,520 mi (2,450 km)
- Elevation: 3,020 ft (920 m)
- Highest elevation (Mauna Kea (Note: Elevation adjusted to North American Vertical Datum of 1988) (Note: The summit of Mauna Kea is the highest point in Oceania. Mauna Kea is also the tallest mountain on Earth when measured from base to summit. The shield volcano sits on the floor of the Pacific Ocean at a depth of 5,998 meters (19,678 ft) for a total height of 10,205.3 meters (33,482 ft).)): 13,795.9 ft (4,205.0 m)
- Lowest elevation (Pacific Ocean): 0 ft (0 m)

Population (2025)
  - Total: ▼1,432,820
  - Rank: 40th
  - Density: 214/sq mi (82.6/km^{2})
  - Rank: 13th
  - Median household income: $95,300 (2023)
  - Income rank: 6th
- Demonym(s): Hawaii resident, Hawaiian (Note: Local usage generally reserves Hawaiian as an ethnonym referring to Native Hawaiians. Hawaii resident or from Hawaii is the preferred local form to refer to state residents in general regardless of ethnicity. Hawaii may also be used adjectivally. The AP Stylebook, 42nd ed. (2007), also prescribes this usage (page 112).)

Language
  - Official languages: English; Hawaiian
- Time zone: UTC−10:00 (Hawaii)
- USPS abbreviation: HI
- ISO 3166 code: US-HI
- Traditional abbreviation: Hi., Haw.
- Latitude: 18° 55′ N to 28° 27′ N
- Longitude: 154° 48′ W to 178° 22′ W
- Website: hawaii.gov

State symbols of Hawaii
List of state symbols
- Flag of Hawaii

- Seal of Hawaii

- Coat of arms of Hawaii

Living insignia
- Bird: Nene
- Fish: Humuhumunukunukuāpuaʻa
- Flower: Pua aloalo
- Insect: Pulelehua
- Tree: Kukui tree

Inanimate insignia
- Dance: Hula
- Food: Kalo (taro)
- Gemstone: ʻĒkaha kū moana (black coral)
- Sport: Heʻe nalu (surfing)

State route marker

State quarter
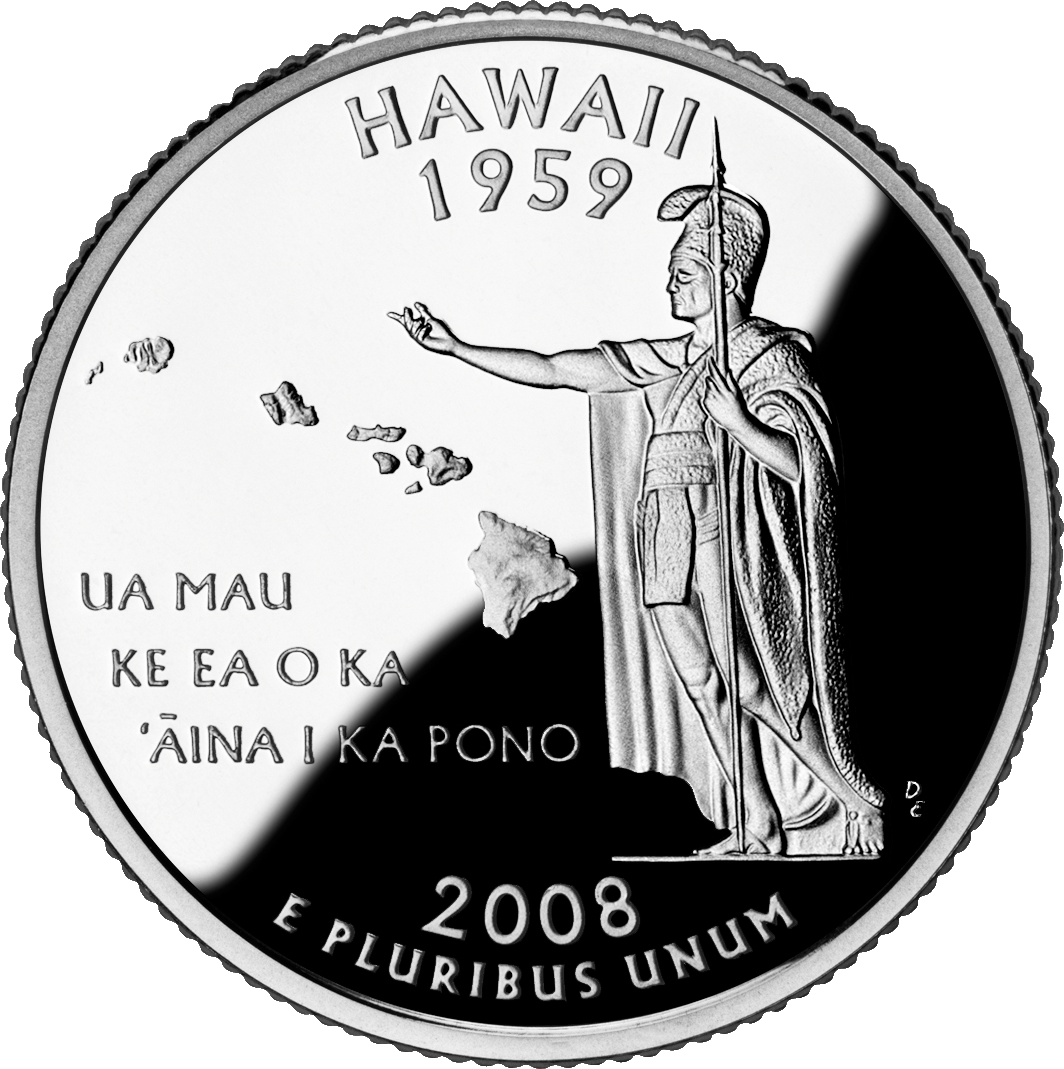
- Released in 2008

Hawaii (/həˈwaɪ.i/ hə-WY-ee; Hawaiian: Hawaiʻi [həˈʋɐjʔi, həˈwɐjʔi]) is an island state of the United States, in the Pacific Ocean about 2,000 miles (3,200 km) southwest of the U.S. mainland. One of the two non-contiguous U.S. states (along with Alaska), it is the only state in Oceania, the only state that is an archipelago, the only state south of the Tropic of Cancer, one of only two states, along with Florida, with regions that have a tropical climate, and one of the two U.S. states, along with Texas, that were internationally recognized sovereign countries before becoming U.S. states. (Note: The Vermont Republic of 1777 to 1791, and the California Republic of 1846, were not internationally recognized.)

Hawaii consists of 137 volcanic islands that make up almost the entire Hawaiian archipelago (the exception is Midway Atoll). Spanning 1,500 miles (2,400 km), the state is physiographically and ethnologically part of the Polynesian subregion of Oceania. Hawaii's ocean coastline is consequently the fourth-longest in the U.S., at about 750 miles (1,210 km). (Note: After Alaska, Florida, and California) The eight main islands, from northwest to southeast, are Niʻihau, Kauaʻi, Oʻahu, Molokaʻi, Lānaʻi, Kahoʻolawe, Maui, and Hawaiʻi, after which the state is named; the last is often called the "Big Island" or "Hawaiʻi Island" to avoid confusion with the state or archipelago. The uninhabited Northwestern Hawaiian Islands make up most of the Papahānaumokuākea Marine National Monument, the largest protected area in the U.S. and the fourth-largest in the world.

Of the 50 U.S. states, Hawaii is the eighth-smallest in land area and the 11th-least populous; but with 1.4 million residents, it ranks 13th in population density. Two-thirds of Hawaii residents live on Oʻahu, home to the state's capital and largest city, Honolulu. Hawaii is one of the most demographically diverse U.S. states, owing to its location in the central Pacific and over two centuries of migration. As one of nine majority-minority states, it has the only Asian American plurality, the largest Buddhist community, and largest proportion of multiracial people in the U.S. Consequently, Hawaii is a unique melting pot of North American and East Asian cultures, in addition to its indigenous Hawaiian heritage.

Settled by Polynesians sometime between 1000 and 1200 CE, Hawaii was home to numerous independent chiefdoms. In 1778, British explorer James Cook was the first known non-Polynesian to arrive at the archipelago; early British influence is reflected in the state flag, which bears a Union Jack. An influx of European and American explorers, traders, and whalers soon arrived, leading to the decimation of the once-isolated indigenous community through the introduction of diseases such as syphilis, tuberculosis, smallpox, and measles; the native Hawaiian population declined from between 300,000 and one million to less than 40,000 by 1890. Hawaii became a unified, internationally recognized kingdom in 1810, remaining independent until American and European businessmen overthrew the monarchy in 1893; this led to annexation by the U.S. in 1898. As a strategically valuable U.S. territory, Hawaii was attacked by Japan on December 7, 1941, which brought it global and historical significance, and contributed to America's entry into World War II. Hawaii is the most recent state to join the union, on August 21, 1959. In 1993, the U.S. government formally apologized for its role in the overthrow of Hawaii's government, which had spurred the Hawaiian sovereignty movement and has led to ongoing efforts to obtain redress for the indigenous population.

From the late 19th century until the mid-20th century, Hawaii's economy was dominated by a plantation economy; it remains a major agricultural exporter due to its fertile soil and uniquely tropical climate in the U.S. Its economy has gradually diversified since the mid-20th century, with tourism and military defense becoming the two largest sectors. The state attracts visitors, surfers, and scientists with its diverse natural scenery, tropical climate, abundant public beaches, oceanic surroundings, active volcanoes, and clear skies. However, since the onset of the 21st century, climate change has wrought existential threats upon Hawaii and its tourism economy, featuring increasing drought and water shortages, sea level rise and hotel flooding in Downtown Honolulu, and wildfire threats. These factors are compounded by an aging and declining population, with an exodus emigrating to the U.S. mainland. Hawaii hosts the U.S. Pacific Fleet, the world's largest naval command, as well as 75,000 employees of the Defense Department. Hawaii's isolation results in one of the highest costs of living in the U.S. However, Hawaii is the third-wealthiest state, and residents have the longest life expectancy of any U.S. state, at 80.7 years.

== Etymology ==
The State of Hawaii derives its name from the name of its largest island, Hawaiʻi. A common explanation of the name of Hawaiʻi is that it was named for Hawaiʻiloa, a figure from Hawaiian oral tradition. He is said to have discovered the islands when they were first settled.

The Hawaiian language word Hawaiʻi is very similar to Proto-Polynesian *Sawaiki, with the reconstructed meaning 'homeland'. (Note: Pollex—a reconstruction of the Proto-Polynesian lexicon, Biggs and Clark, 1994. The asterisk preceding the word signifies that it is a reconstructed word form.) Cognates of Hawaiʻi are found in other Polynesian languages, including Māori (Hawaiki), Rarotongan (ʻAvaiki) and Samoan (Savaiʻi). According to linguists Pukui and Elbert, "elsewhere in Polynesia, Hawaiʻi or a cognate is the name of the underworld or of the ancestral home, but in Hawaii, the name has no meaning".

=== Spelling of state name ===
In 1978, Hawaiian was added to the Constitution of the State of Hawaii as an official state language alongside English. The title of the state constitution is The Constitution of the State of Hawaii. Article XV, Section 1 of the Constitution uses The State of Hawaii. Diacritics were not used because the document, drafted in 1949, predates the use of the ʻokina ⟨ʻ⟩ and the kahakō in modern Hawaiian orthography. The exact spelling of the state's name in the Hawaiian language is Hawaiʻi. (Note: The ʻokina, which resembles an apostrophe and precedes the final i in Hawaiʻi, is a consonant in Hawaiian and phonetically represents the glottal stop /ʔ/.)

In the Hawaii Admission Act that granted Hawaiian statehood, the federal government used Hawaii as the state name, but most official Hawaiian state government publications, departments, and office titles use Hawaiʻi, including the Governor of Hawaiʻi, the Hawaiʻi State Legislature, the Hawaiʻi State Judiciary, the University of Hawaiʻi, the Hawaiʻi State Seal, the Flag of Hawaiʻi, and the Hawaiʻi Board on Geographic Names. The Hawaiʻi Tourism Authority's official policy is to "recognize the importance of using these markings to preserve the indigenous language and culture of Hawaiʻi and use them in all forms of communications."

== Geography and environment ==
Island	Nickname	Area	Population (as of 2020)	Density	Highest point	Maximum elevation	Age (Ma)	Location
Hawaiʻi	The Big Island	4,028.0 sq mi (10,432.5 km^{2})	200,629	49.8/sq mi (19.2/km^{2})	Mauna Kea	13,796 ft (4,205 m)	0.4	19°34′N 155°30′W
Maui	The Valley Isle	727.2 sq mi (1,883.4 km^{2})	164,221	225.8/sq mi (87.2/km^{2})	Haleakalā	10,023 ft (3,055 m)	1.3–0.8	20°48′N 156°20′W
Oʻahu	The Gathering Place	596.7 sq mi (1,545.4 km^{2})	1,016,508	1,703.5/sq mi (657.7/km^{2})	Mount Kaʻala	4,003 ft (1,220 m)	3.7–2.6	21°28′N 157°59′W
Kauaʻi	The Garden Isle	552.3 sq mi (1,430.5 km^{2})	73,298	132.7/sq mi (51.2/km^{2})	Kawaikini	5,243 ft (1,598 m)	5.1	22°05′N 159°30′W
Molokaʻi	The Friendly Isle	260.0 sq mi (673.4 km^{2})	7,345	28.3/sq mi (10.9/km^{2})	Kamakou	4,961 ft (1,512 m)	1.9–1.8	21°08′N 157°02′W
Lānaʻi	The Pineapple Isle	140.5 sq mi (363.9 km^{2})	3,367	24.0/sq mi (9.3/km^{2})	Lānaʻihale	3,366 ft (1,026 m)	1.3	20°50′N 156°56′W
Niʻihau	The Forbidden Isle	69.5 sq mi (180.0 km^{2})	84	1.2/sq mi (0.5/km^{2})	Mount Pānīʻau	1,250 ft (381 m)	4.9	21°54′N 160°10′W
Kahoʻolawe	The Target Isle	44.6 sq mi (115.5 km^{2})	0	0/sq mi (0/km^{2})	Puʻuomoaʻula Nui	1,483 ft (452 m)	1.0	20°33′N 156°36′W

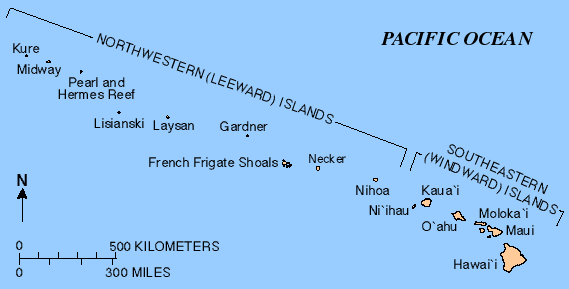
map of Hawaiian Islands

There are eight main Hawaiian islands. Seven are inhabited, but only six are open to tourists and locals. Niʻihau is privately managed by brothers Bruce and Keith Robinson; access is restricted to those who have their permission. This island is also home to native Hawaiians. Access to uninhabited Kahoʻolawe island is also restricted and anyone who enters without permission is subject to arrest. Kahoʻolawe may also be dangerous since it was a military base during the world wars and could still have unexploded ordnance.

=== Topography ===
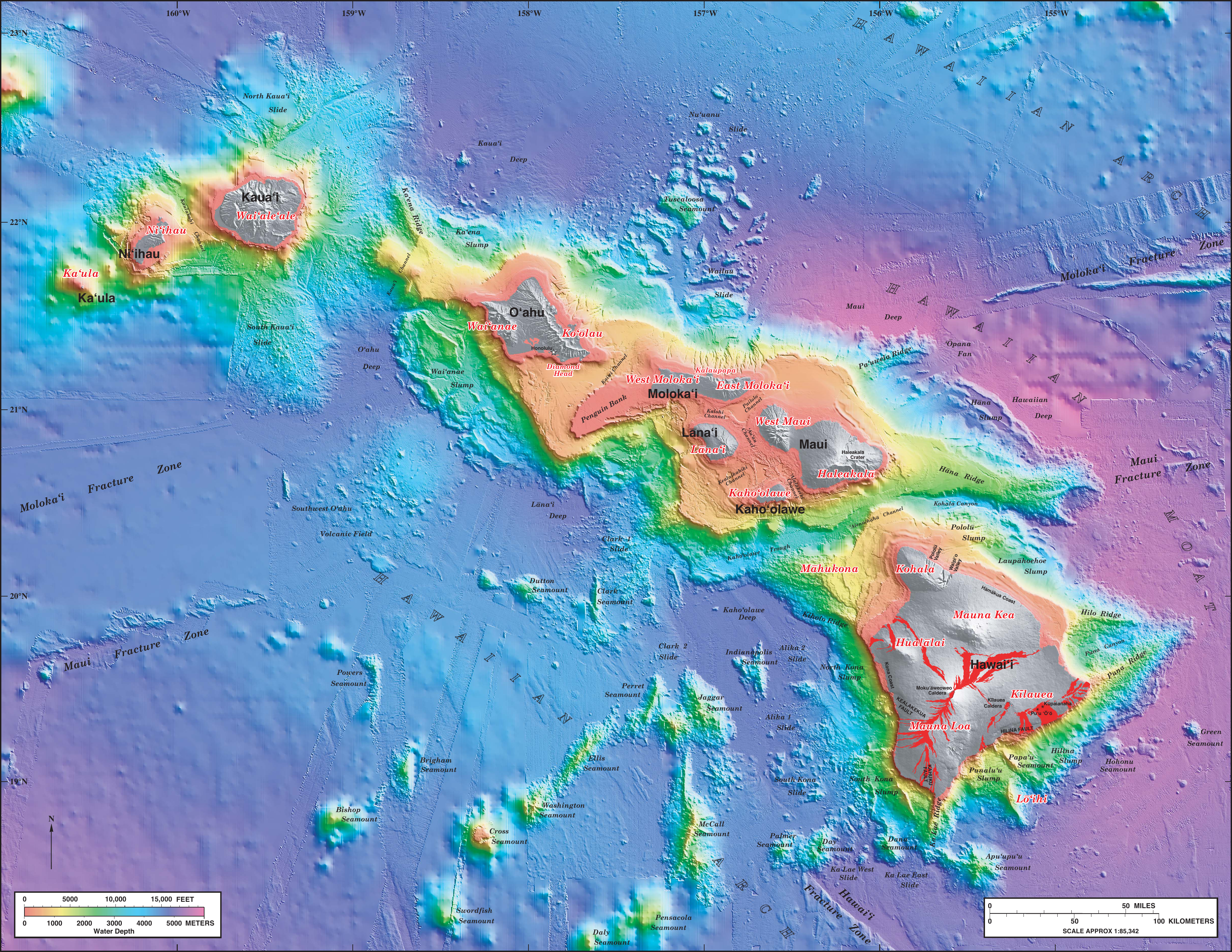
Bathymetric map of main Hawaiian Islands

The Hawaiian archipelago is 2,000 mi (3,200 km) southwest of the contiguous United States. Hawaii is the southernmost U.S. state and the second farthest west, after Alaska. Like Alaska, Hawaii borders no other U.S. state. It is the only U.S. state not in North America, as it is in Oceania, and the only one completely surrounded by water and entirely an archipelago.

In addition to the eight main islands, the state has many smaller islands and islets. Kaʻula is a small island near Niʻihau. The Northwestern Hawaiian Islands is a group of nine small, older islands northwest of Kauaʻi that extends from Nīhoa to Kure Atoll; they are remnants of much larger volcanic mountains. Across the archipelago are around 130 small rocks and islets, such as Molokini, which are made up of either volcanic or marine sedimentary rock.

Hawaiʻi's tallest mountain, Mauna Kea, is 13,796 ft (4,205 m) above mean sea level; but it is taller than Mount Everest when measured from the base of the mountain, which is on the floor of the Pacific Ocean, rising about 33,500 feet (10,200 m).

=== Geology ===
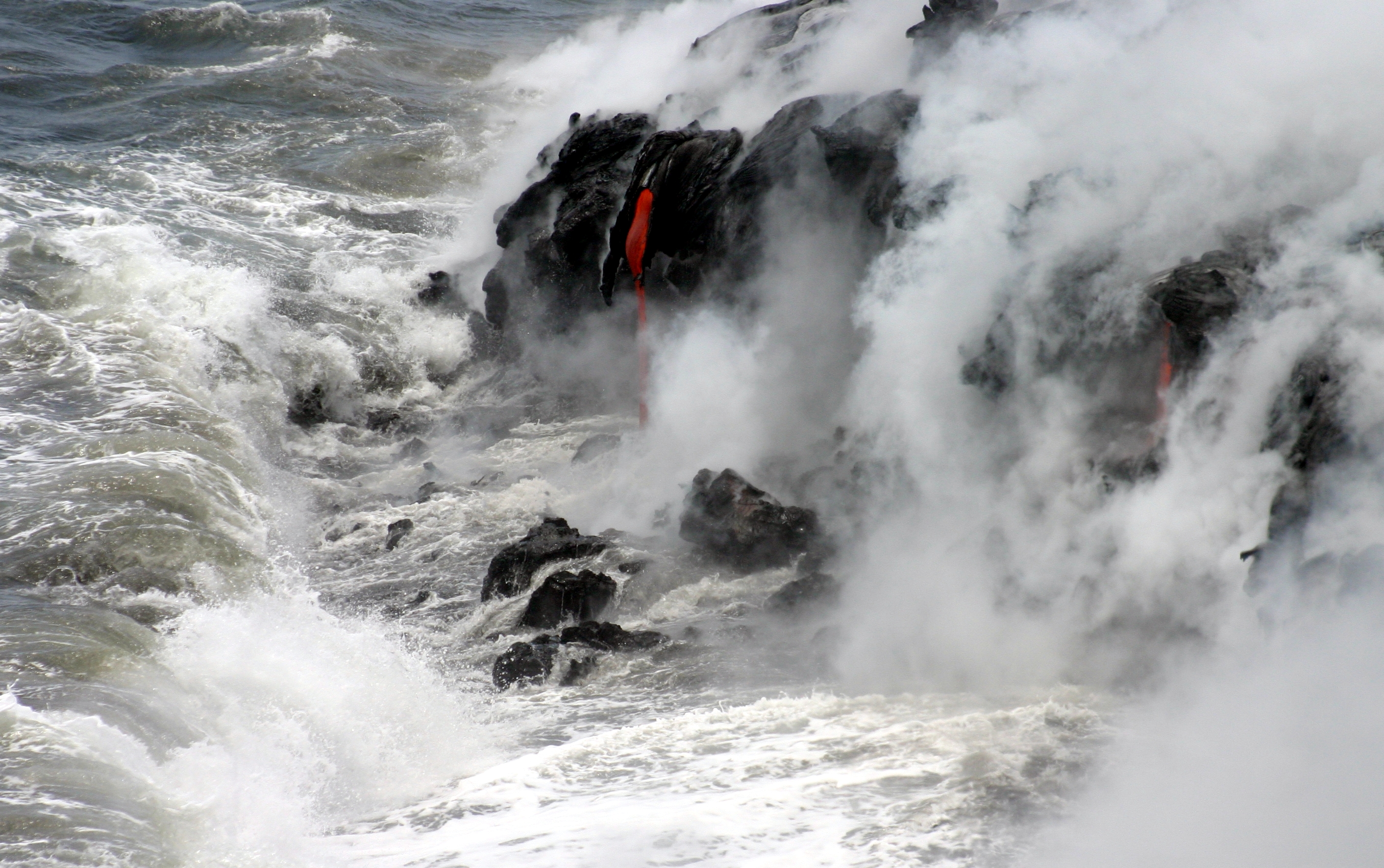
Pāhoehoe (smooth lava) spills into the ocean, forming new rock

The Hawaiian islands were formed by volcanic activity initiated at an undersea magma source called the Hawaiʻi hotspot. The process continues to build islands; the tectonic plate beneath much of the Pacific Ocean continually moves northwest and the hotspot remains stationary, slowly creating new volcanoes. Because of the hotspot's location, all active land volcanoes are on the southern half of Hawaiʻi Island. The newest volcano, Kamaʻehuakanaloa (formerly Lōʻihi), is south of the coast of Hawaiʻi Island.

The last volcanic eruption outside Hawaiʻi Island occurred at Haleakalā on Maui before the late 18th century, possibly hundreds of years earlier. In 1790, Kīlauea exploded; it is the deadliest eruption known to have occurred in the modern era in what is now the United States. Up to 5,405 warriors and their families marching on Kīlauea were killed by the eruption. Volcanic activity and subsequent erosion have created impressive geological features. Hawaii Island has the second-highest point among the world's islands.

On the volcanoes' flanks, slope instability has generated damaging earthquakes and related tsunamis, particularly in 1868 and 1975. Catastrophic debris avalanches on the ocean island volcanoes' submerged flanks have created steep cliffs.

Kīlauea erupted in May 2018, opening 22 fissure vents on its eastern rift zone. The Leilani Estates and Lanipuna Gardens are within this territory. The eruption destroyed at least 36 buildings and this, coupled with the lava flows and the sulfur dioxide fumes, necessitated the evacuation of more than 2,000 inhabitants from their neighborhoods.

=== Flora and fauna ===
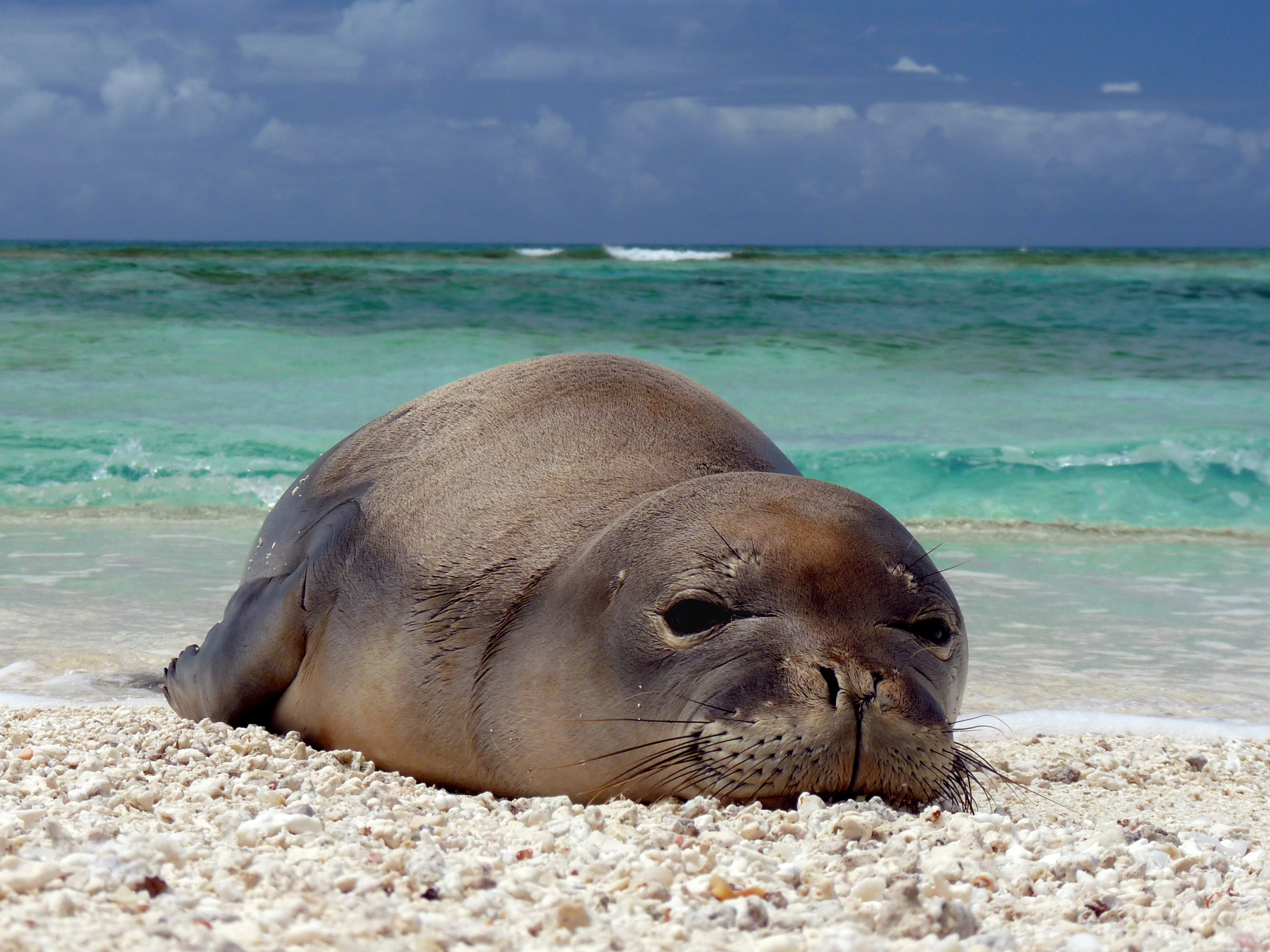
A Hawaiian monk seal seen at French Frigate Shoals, located in the Northwestern Hawaiian Islands, protected as part of the Papahānaumokuākea Marine National Monument.

The islands of Hawaiʻi are distant from other land habitats, and life is thought to have arrived there by wind, waves (i.e., ocean currents), and wings (i.e., birds, insects, and seeds they may have carried on their feathers). Hawaiʻi has more endangered species and has lost a higher percentage of its endemic species than any other U.S. state. The endemic plant Brighamia now requires hand pollination because its natural pollinator is presumed to be extinct. The two species of Brighamia—B. rockii and B. insignis—are represented in the wild by around 120 individual plants. To ensure that these plants set seed, biologists rappel down 3,000-foot (910 m) cliffs to brush pollen onto their stigmas.

32 extant birds are endemic to the state such as Laysan and Hawaiian duck, nēnē, Hawaiian coot, Hawaiian hawk, ʻŌmaʻo, ʻAkikiki, Palila, ʻApapane, ʻIʻiwi, alawī, and Hawaiian petrel.

=== Terrestrial ecology ===
The archipelago's extant main islands have been above the ocean's surface for less than 10 million years, a fraction of the time biological colonization and evolution have occurred there. The islands are known for the environmental diversity that occurs on high mountains within a trade winds field. Native Hawaiians developed complex horticultural practices to utilize the surrounding ecosystem for agriculture. Cultural practices developed to enshrine values of environmental stewardship and reciprocity with the natural world, resulting in widespread biodiversity and intricate social and environmental relationships that still persist. On a single island, the climate around the coasts can range from dry tropical (less than 20 inches or 510 millimeters annual rainfall) to wet tropical; on the slopes, environments range from tropical rainforest (more than 200 inches or 5,100 millimeters per year), through a temperate climate, to alpine conditions with a cold, dry climate. The rainy climate affects soil development, which largely determines ground permeability and the distribution of streams and wetlands.

=== Protected areas ===
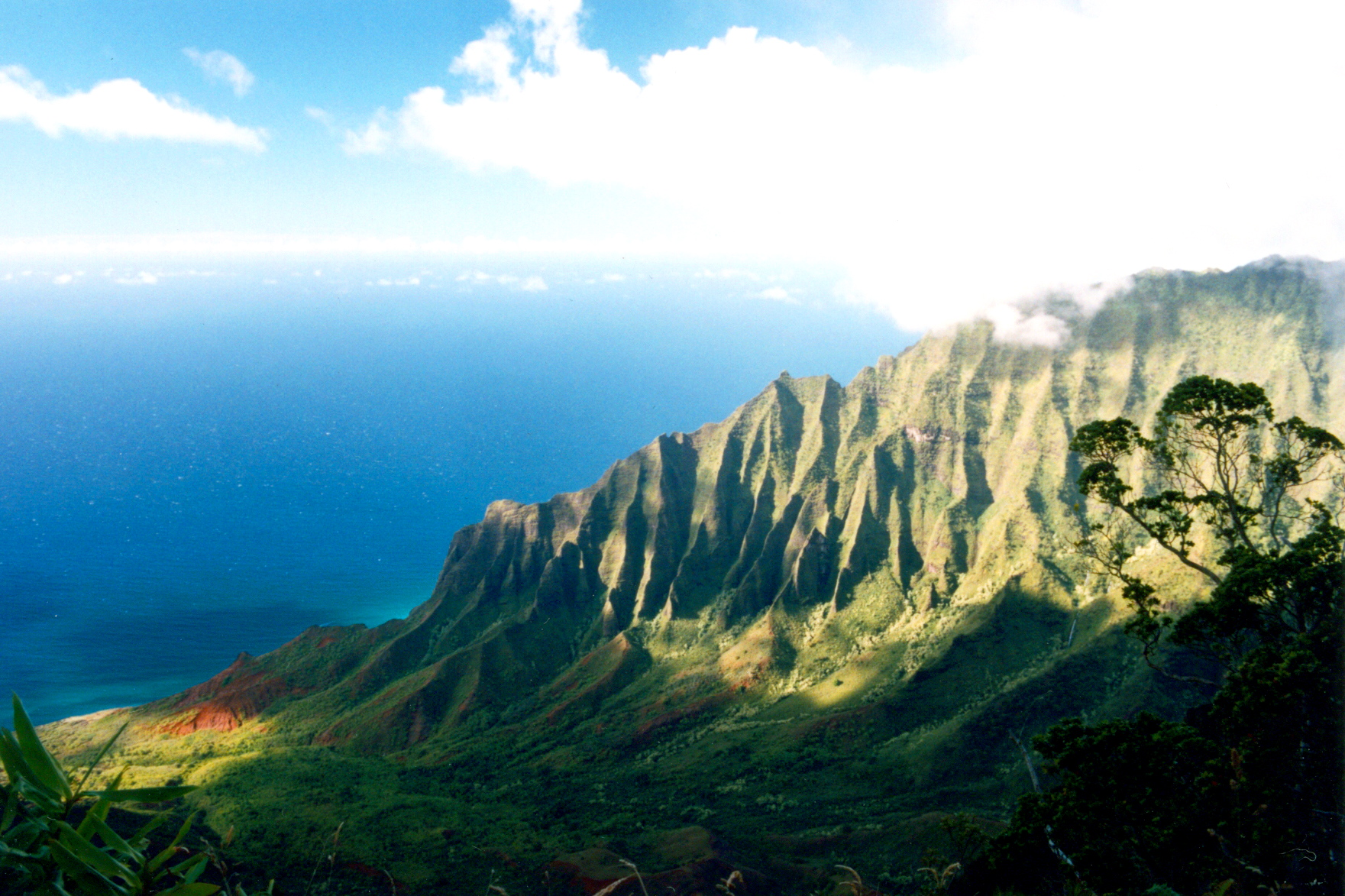
Nā Pali Coast State Park, Kauaʻi

Several areas in Hawaii are under the National Park Service's protection. Hawaii has two national parks: Haleakalā National Park, near Kula on Maui, which features the dormant volcano Haleakalā that formed east Maui; and Hawaii Volcanoes National Park, in the southeast region of Hawaiʻi Island, which includes the active volcano Kīlauea and its rift zones.

There are three national historical parks: Kalaupapa National Historical Park in Kalaupapa, Molokaʻi, the site of a former leper colony; Kaloko-Honokōhau National Historical Park in Kailua-Kona on Hawaiʻi Island; and Puʻuhonua o Hōnaunau National Historical Park, an ancient place of refuge on Hawaiʻi Island's west coast. Other areas under the National Park Service's control include Ala Kahakai National Historic Trail on Hawaiʻi Island and the USS Arizona Memorial at Pearl Harbor on Oʻahu.

President George W. Bush proclaimed the Papahānaumokuākea Marine National Monument on June 15, 2006. The monument covers roughly 140,000 square miles (360,000 km^{2}) of reefs, atolls, and shallow and deep sea out to 50 miles (80 km) offshore in the Pacific Ocean—an area larger than all the national parks in the U.S. combined.

=== Climate ===
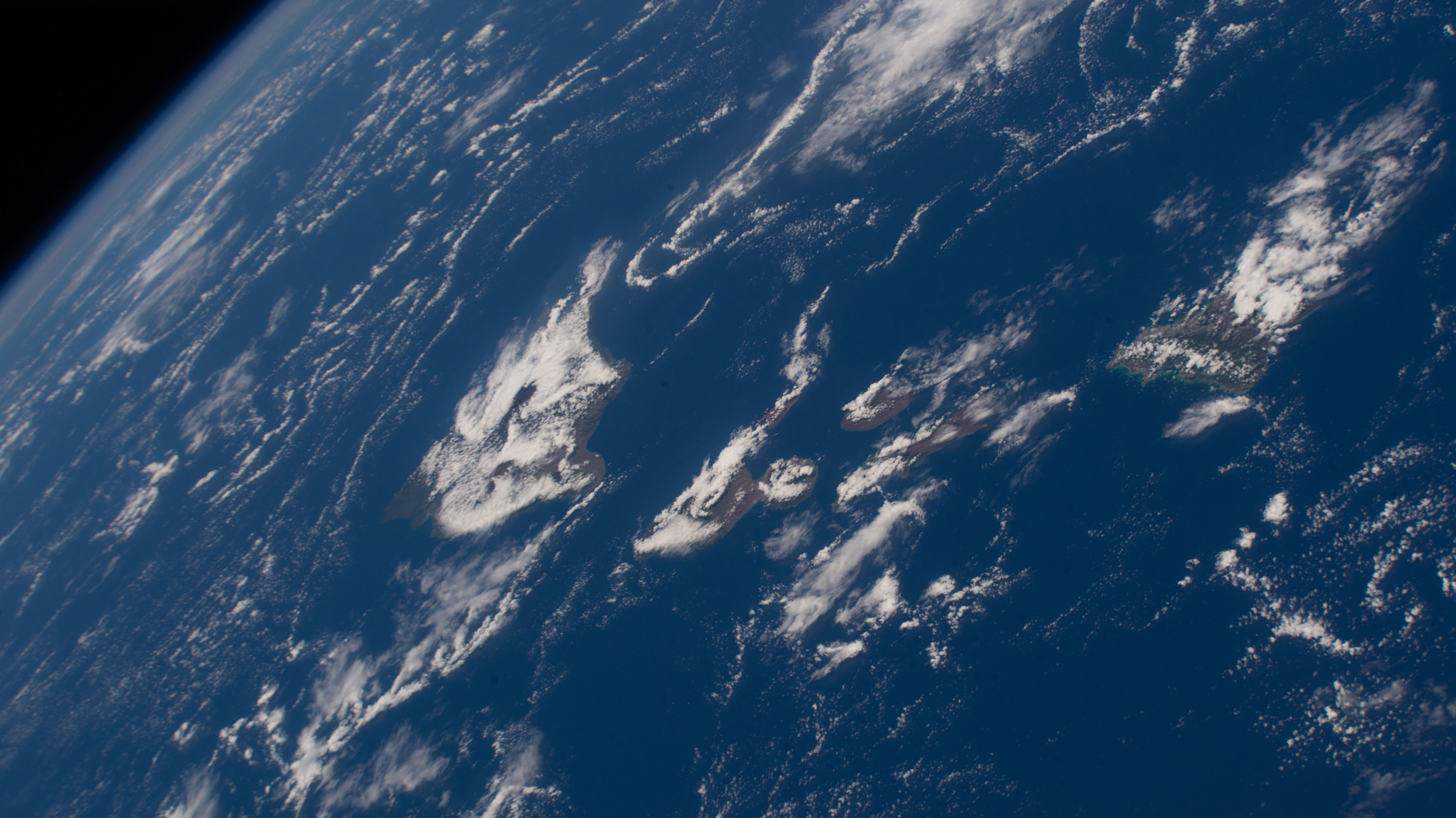
Partly cloudy conditions and a gentle breeze at 1:43 PM HDT; north is oriented towards the lower right in this photo taken from the International Space Station on June 24, 2022

Hawaiʻi has a tropical climate. Temperatures and humidity tend to be less extreme because of near-constant trade winds from the east. Summer highs reach around 88 °F (31 °C) during the day, with lows of 75 °F (24 °C) at night. Winter day temperatures are usually around 83 °F (28 °C); at low elevation they seldom dip below 65 °F (18 °C) at night. Snow, not usually associated with the tropics, falls at 13,800 feet (4,200 m) on Mauna Kea and Mauna Loa on Hawaii Island in the winter. Snow rarely falls on Haleakalā. Mount Waiʻaleʻale on Kauaʻi has the second-highest average annual rainfall on Earth, about 460 inches (12,000 mm) per year. Most of Hawaii experiences only two seasons; the dry season runs from May to October and the wet season is from October to April.

With climate change, Hawaiʻi is getting drier and hotter. The highest temperature recorded in the state, in Pahala on April 27, 1931, is 100 °F (38 °C), tied with Alaska as the lowest record high temperature observed in a U.S. state. Hawaiʻi's record low temperature is 12 °F (−11 °C), observed in May 1979 on the summit of Mauna Kea. Hawaiʻi is the only state to have never recorded subzero Fahrenheit temperatures.

Climates vary considerably on each island; they can be divided into windward and leeward (koʻolau and kona, respectively) areas based upon location relative to the higher mountains. Windward sides face cloud cover.

=== Environmental issues ===
Hawaii has a decades-long history of hosting more military space for the United States than any other territory or state. This military activity has taken a sharp toll on the environmental health of the Hawaiian archipelago, degrading its beaches and soil and making some places entirely unsafe due to unexploded ordnance. According to scholar Winona LaDuke: "The vast militarization of Hawaii has profoundly damaged the land. According to the Environmental Protection Agency, there are more federal hazardous waste sites in Hawaii—31—than in any other U.S. state." Hawaii State Representative Roy Takumi writes in "Challenging U.S. Militarism in Hawaiʻi and Okinawa" that these military bases and hazardous waste sites have meant "the confiscation of large tracts of land from native peoples" and quotes the Hawaiian activist George Helm as asking: "What is national defense when what is being destroyed is the very thing the military is entrusted to defend, the sacred land of Hawaiʻi?" Contemporary Indigenous Hawaiians are still protesting the occupation of their homeland and environmental degradation due to increased militarization in the wake of 9/11.

After the rise of sugarcane plantations in the mid-19th century, island ecology changed dramatically. Plantations require massive quantities of water, and European and American plantation owners transformed the land in order to access it, primarily by building tunnels to divert water from the mountains to the plantations, constructing reservoirs, and digging wells. These changes have made lasting impacts on the land and continue to contribute to resource scarcity for Native Hawaiians.

According to Stanford scientist and scholar Sibyl Diver, Indigenous Hawaiians engage in a reciprocal relationship with the land, "based on principles of mutual caretaking, reciprocity and sharing". This relationship ensures the longevity, sustainability, and natural cycles of growth and decay, as well as cultivating a sense of respect for the land and humility towards one's place in an ecosystem.

The tourism industry's ongoing expansion and its pressure on local systems of ecology, cultural tradition and infrastructure creates a conflict between economic and environmental health. In 2020, the Center for Biological Diversity reported on the plastic pollution of Hawaii's Kamilo beach, citing "massive piles of plastic waste". Invasive species are spreading, and chemical and pathogenic runoff is contaminating groundwater and coastal waters.

In June 2022, a lawsuit was filed against the Hawaii Department of Transportation claiming that the state's pro-fossil fuel transportation policies violated their state constitutional rights and created "untenable levels of greenhouse gas emissions." The lawsuit, Navahine F v. Hawaii Department of Transportation, was filed by 13 young people in the state, most of whom are Indigenous. The resulting legal settlement will force the state to move more aggressively towards a zero-emission transportation system by 2045.

== History ==
Hawaiʻi is one of two U.S. states, along with Texas, that were internationally recognized sovereign nations before becoming U.S. states. The Kingdom of Hawaiʻi was sovereign from 1810 until 1893, when resident American and European capitalists and landholders overthrew the monarchy. Hawaiʻi was an independent republic from 1894 until August 12, 1898, when it officially became a U.S. territory. Hawaiʻi was admitted as a U.S. state on August 21, 1959.

=== Human migration and arrival – Ancient Hawaiʻi (1000–1778) ===
The date of human arrival and habitation of the Hawaiian Islands is the subject of academic debate. Early archaeological studies suggested that Polynesians from the Marquesas Islands or Society Islands may have arrived as early as the 3rd century CE. Some archaeologists and historians think it was a later wave of immigrants from Tahiti around 1100 CE who introduced a new line of high chiefs, the kapu system, the practice of human sacrifice, and the building of heiau. This later immigration is detailed in Hawaiian mythology (moʻolelo) about Paʻao. Other authors say there is no archaeological or linguistic evidence of a later influx of Tahitian settlers and that Paʻao must be regarded as a myth. More recent archaeological studies further suggest that the first settlement of Hawaii was not until around 900–1200 CE.

The islands' history is marked by a slow, steady growth in population and the size of the chiefdoms, which grew to encompass whole islands. Local chiefs, called aliʻi, ruled their settlements, and launched wars to extend their influence and defend their communities from predatory rivals. Ancient Hawaiʻi was a caste-based society, much like that of Hindus in India. Population growth was facilitated by ecological and agricultural practices that combined upland agriculture (manuka), ocean fishing (makai), fishponds and gardening systems. These systems were upheld by spiritual and religious beliefs, like the lokahi, that linked cultural continuity with the health of the natural world. According to Hawaiian scholar Mililani Trask, the lokahi symbolizes the "greatest of the traditions, values, and practices of our people ... There are three points in the triangle—the Creator, Akua; the peoples of the earth, Kanaka Maoli; and the land, the ʻaina. These three things all have a reciprocal relationship."

==== Possible European contact before 1778 ====
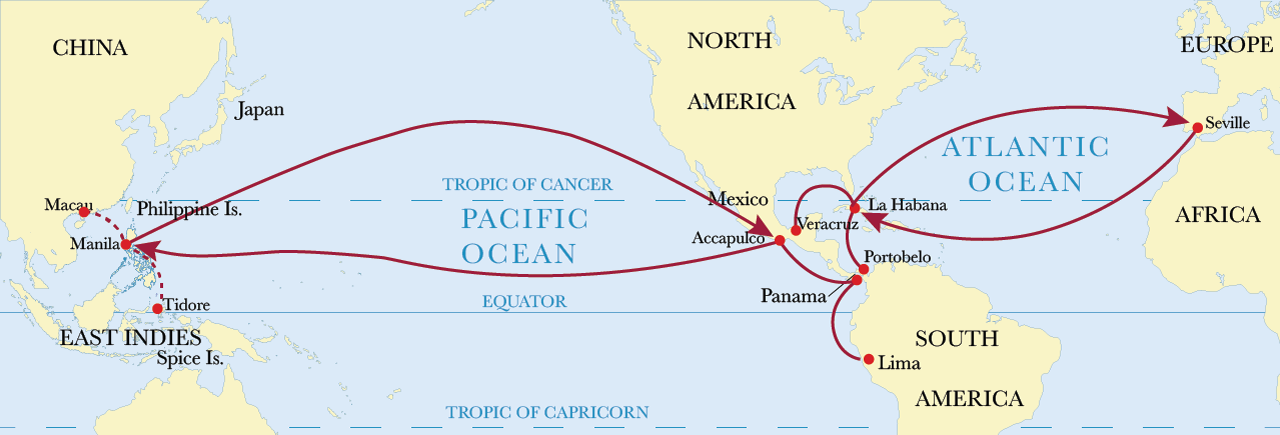
Manila-Acapulco galleon trade route, showing onward route to Spain

From 1565 to 1815, Spanish trading ships, or galleons, crossed the Pacific along a route from Acapulco in New Spain (modern Mexico) to Manila in Spanish Philippines. They made this trip once or twice yearly using a route kept secret to protect the Spanish trade monopoly against competing powers. Some sources speculate that sightings of, or interaction with, Hawaii must have occurred.

“It seems improbable that Spanish mariners could have made several hundred trips … without becoming Hawaii’s first European discoverers.”

By 1589, Ortelius was publishing the Maris Pacifici first ever Pacific map featuring an intriguing resemblance of the Hawaiian Islands "Los Bolcanes" and "La Farfania" in the middle of the Pacific by the Tropic of Cancer.

In 1743, British Commodore George Anson captured a Spanish galleon on which he found a chart of the Pacific that depicted a group of islands at the same latitude as the Hawaiian islands but with a longitude ten degrees to the east. One of these islands is labeled La Mesa ('the Table'). This is conjectured to be Hawaii Island since this “agrees very well with the appearance of Mauna Loa ... when seen at a great distance”.

Many scholars have refuted claims of Spanish knowledge of Hawaii during this period. However, based on accounts from native Hawaiian oral tradition, Oskar Spate leaves open the possibility of one-way contact and that it is "likely that Spanish castaways reached Hawaii and survived".

=== First recorded contact ===
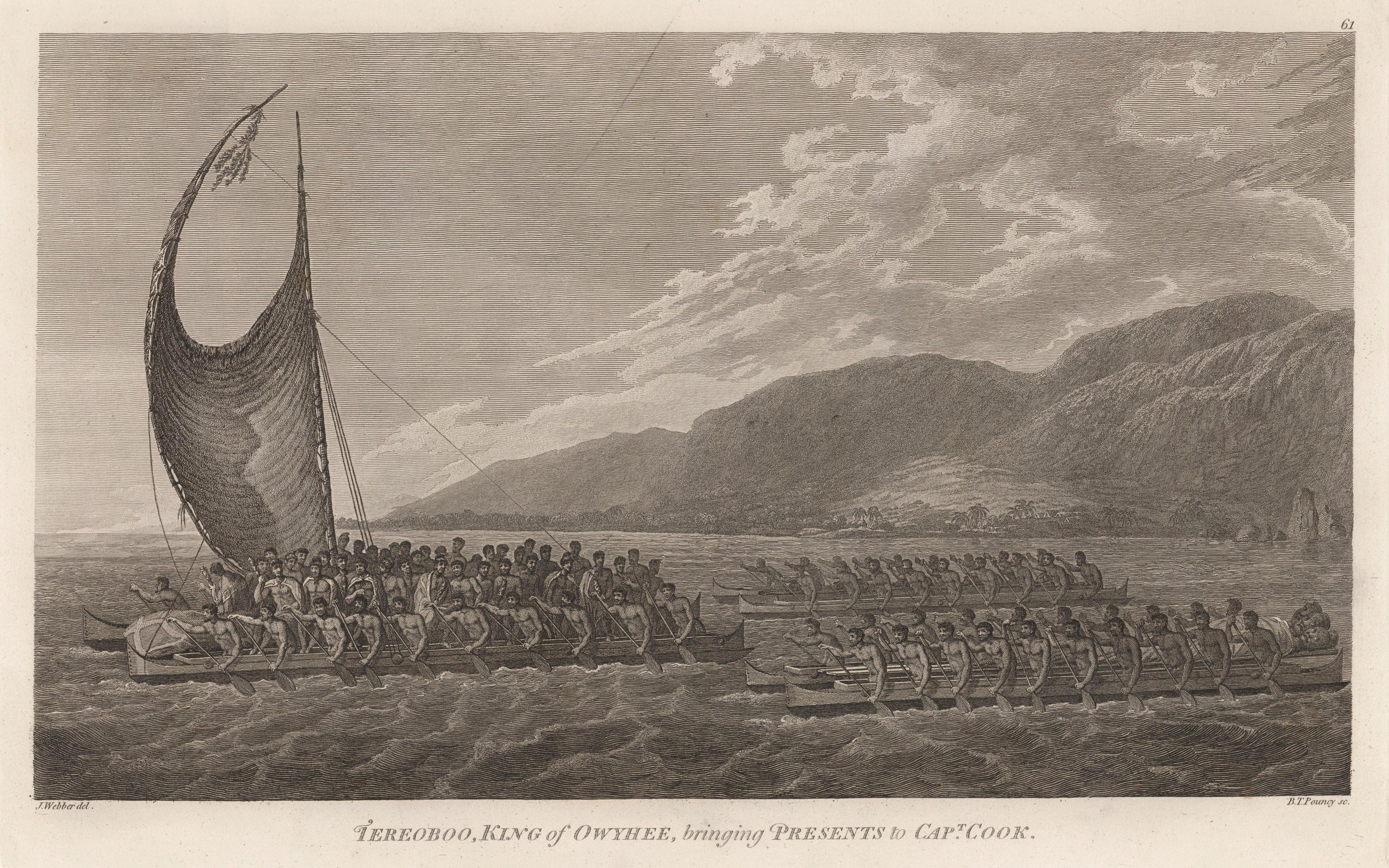
Tereoboo, King of Owyhee, bringing presents to Captain Cook by John Webber (drawn in 1779, published in 1784)

In January 1778, British Captain James Cook encountered the Hawaiian Islands serendipitously while crossing the Pacific during his third voyage of exploration. This marked the first documented contact by a European explorer with Hawaiʻi. Cook named the archipelago "the Sandwich Islands" in honor of his sponsor, John Montagu, 4th Earl of Sandwich. Cook returned to the Hawaiian Islands in 1779 to resupply and overwinter, anchoring in Kealakakua off Hawaii Island for one month. Relations with the local people were peaceful at first, then deteriorated, and Cook was among those killed when violence broke out between the British and local Hawaiians.

After Cook, Hawaii was not visited by any foreign ships for seven years but after 1786 visits became increasingly frequent. At the end of the 18th century, the maritime fur trade developed between the northwest coast of North America and Asia, bringing ships of many nations to the North Pacific Ocean. The Hawaiian islands became established as a convenient source of supplies and destination for overwintering not only for fur traders but also ships engaged in general cross-Pacific commerce.

Historian Ralph Kuykendall has called the impact of these foreign visitors on the hitherto isolated Hawaiian Islands an "invasion" that "little by little overwhelmed the old culture of the islands". Over the decades after the first contact, the foreign resident population slowly grew; foreigners imported iron tools, manufactured items, and household utensils; they also introduced firearms, alcohol, tobacco, non-native plants, and—inadvertently—arthropods previously unknown to the islands such as mosquitoes and scorpions. Native Hawaiians were vulnerable to Eurasian diseases to which they had less resistance. It is estimated that the native population had declined by half 40 years after Cook's arrival and continued to decline throughout the 19th century. During the 1850s, measles killed a fifth of Hawaiʻi's people.

=== Kingdom of Hawaiʻi ===
==== House of Kamehameha ====
Evolution of kingdom borders in Hawaii during Kamehameha's conquests

During the 1780s and early 1790s, the Hawaiian Islands were divided among several warring chiefdoms. In 1795, the fighting ended when Kamehameha, then a chief (aliʻi) of Hawaii Island, conquered most of the main islands in the archipelago (including Maui and Oʻahu), then founded the Hawaiian Kingdom and the House of Kamehameha dynasty. Kauaʻi (with nearby Niʻihau) remained independent until 1810, when it joined the Hawaiian Kingdom peacefully.

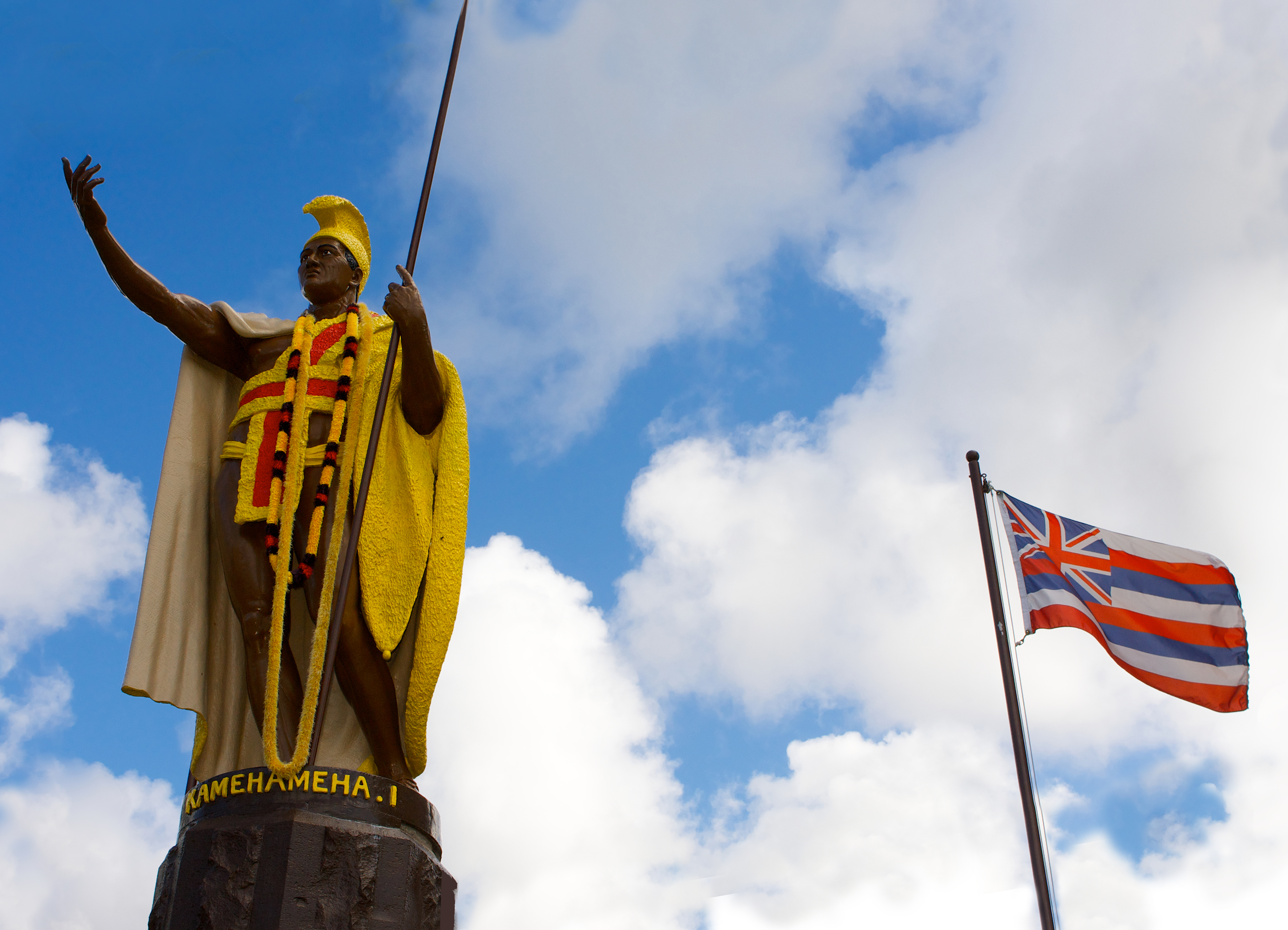
Kamehameha I conquered the Hawaiian Islands and established a unified monarchy across the archipelago.

After Kamehameha II inherited the throne in 1819, American Protestant missionaries to Hawaiʻi converted many Hawaiians to Christianity. Missionaries have argued that one function of missionary work was to "civilize" and "purify" perceived heathenism in the New World. This carried into Hawaiʻi. According to historical archaeologist James L. Flexner, "missionaries provided the moral means to rationalize conquest and wholesale conversion to Christianity". But rather than abandon traditional beliefs entirely, most native Hawaiians merged their Indigenous religion with Christianity. Missionaries used their influence to end many traditional practices, including the kapu system, the prevailing legal system before European contact, and heiau, or "temples" to religious figures. Kapu, which typically translates to "the sacred", refers to social regulations (like gender and class restrictions) based on spiritual beliefs.

Under the missionaries' guidance, laws against gambling, consuming alcohol, dancing the hula, breaking the Sabbath, and polygamy were enacted. Without the kapu system, many temples and priestly statuses were jeopardized, idols were burned, and participation in Christianity increased. When Kamehameha III inherited the throne at age 12, his advisors pressured him to merge Christianity with traditional Hawaiian ways. Under the guidance of his kuhina nui (his mother and coregent Elizabeth Kaʻahumanu) and British allies, Hawaiʻi turned into a Christian monarchy with the signing of the 1840 Constitution. Hiram Bingham I, a prominent Protestant missionary, was a trusted adviser to the monarchy during this period. Other missionaries and their descendants became active in commercial and political affairs, leading to conflicts between the monarchy and its restive American subjects. Missionaries from the Roman Catholic Church and from The Church of Jesus Christ of Latter-day Saints were also active in the kingdom, initially converting a minority of the Native Hawaiian population, but later becoming the largest and second-largest religious denominations on the islands, respectively. Missionaries from each major group administered to the leper colony at Kalaupapa on Molokaʻi, which was established in 1866 and operated well into the 20th century. The best known were Father Damien and Mother Marianne Cope, both of whom were canonized in the early 21st century as Roman Catholic saints.

The death of the bachelor King Kamehameha V—who did not name an heir—resulted in the popular election of Lunalilo over Kalākaua. Lunalilo died the next year, also without naming an heir. In 1874, the election was contested within the legislature between Kalākaua and Emma, Queen Consort of Kamehameha IV. After riots broke out, the U.S. and Britain landed troops on the islands to restore order. The Legislative Assembly chose King Kalākaua as monarch by a vote of 39 to 6 on February 12, 1874.

==== 1887 Constitution and overthrow preparations ====
In 1887, Kalākaua was forced to sign the 1887 Constitution of the Kingdom of Hawaiʻi. Drafted by white businessmen and lawyers, the document stripped the king of much of his authority. It established a property qualification for voting that effectively disenfranchised most Hawaiians and immigrant laborers and favored the wealthier, white elite. Resident whites were allowed to vote but resident Asians were not. As the 1887 Constitution was signed under threat of violence, it is known as the Bayonet Constitution. King Kalākaua, reduced to a figurehead, reigned until his death in 1891. His sister, Queen Liliʻuokalani, succeeded him; she was the last monarch of Hawaiʻi.

In 1893, Liliʻuokalani announced plans for a new constitution to proclaim herself an absolute monarch. On January 14, 1893, a group of mostly Euro-American business leaders and residents formed the Committee of Safety to stage a coup d'état against the kingdom and seek annexation by the United States. U.S. Government Minister John L. Stevens, responding to a request from the Committee of Safety, summoned a company of U.S. Marines. The queen's soldiers did not resist. According to historian William Russ, the monarchy was unable to protect itself. In Hawaiian Autonomy, Liliʻuokalani wrote:

If we did not by force resist their final outrage, it was because we could not do so without striking at the military force of the United States. Whatever constraint the executive of this great country may be under to recognize the present government at Honolulu has been forced upon it by no act of ours, but by the unlawful acts of its own agents. Attempts to repudiate those acts are vain.

In a message to Sanford B. Dole, Liliʻuokalani wrote:

Now to avoid any collision of armed forces and perhaps the loss of life, I do under this protest, and impelled by said force, yield my authority until such time as the Government of the United States shall, upon the facts being presented to it, undo the action of its representatives and reinstate me in the authority which I claim as the constitutional sovereign of the Hawaiian Islands.

=== Overthrow of 1893 – Republic of Hawaiʻi (1894–1898) ===
The treason trials of 1892 brought together the main players in the 1893 overthrow. American Minister John L. Stevens voiced support for Native Hawaiian revolutionaries; William R. Castle, a Committee of Safety member, served as a defense counsel in the treason trials; Alfred Stedman Hartwell, the 1893 annexation commissioner, led the defense effort; and Sanford B. Dole ruled as a supreme court justice against acts of conspiracy and treason.

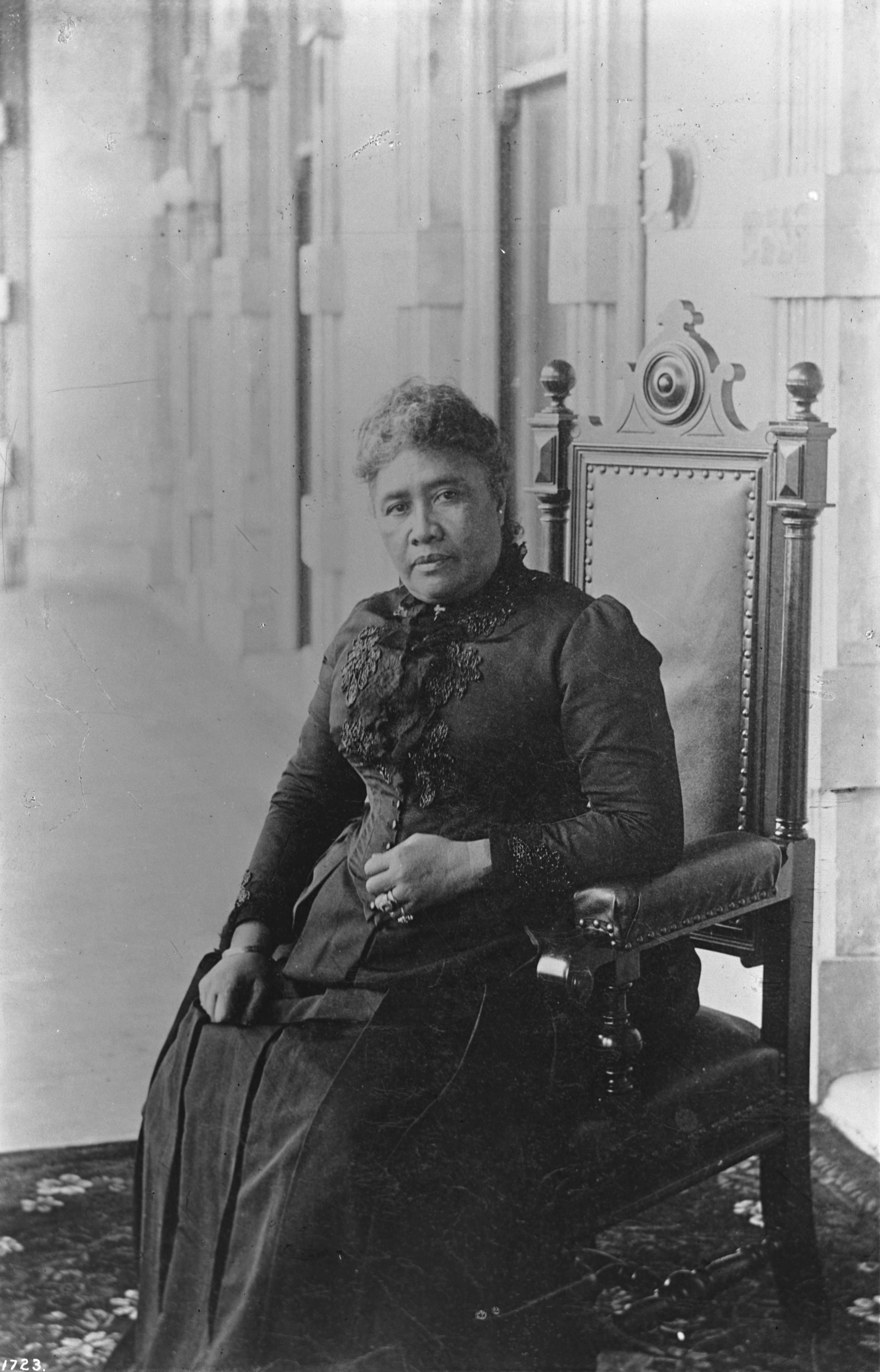
Queen Liliʻuokalani, the last reigning monarch of the Hawaiian Kingdom

On January 17, 1893, a small group of sugar and pineapple-growing businessmen, aided by the U.S. minister to Hawaii and backed by heavily armed U.S. soldiers and marines, deposed Queen Liliʻuokalani and installed a provisional government composed of members of the Committee of Safety. According to scholar Lydia Kualapai and Hawaii State Representative Roy Takumi, this committee was formed against the will of Indigenous Hawaiian voters, who constituted the majority of voters at the time. According to scholar J Kehaulani Kauanui, it consisted of "thirteen white men". Stevens conspired with U.S. citizens to overthrow the monarchy. After the overthrow, Dole, a citizen of Hawaii and cousin to James Dole, owner of Hawaiian Fruit Company, a company that benefited from the annexation of Hawaii, became president of the republic when the Provisional Government of Hawaiʻi ended on July 4, 1894.

Controversy ensued in the following years as the queen tried to regain her throne. Scholar Lydia Kualapai writes that Liliʻuokalani had "yielded under protest not to the counterfeit Provisional Government of Hawaii but to the superior force of the United States of America" and wrote letters of protest to the president requesting a recognizance of allyship and a reinstatement of her sovereignty against the recent actions of the Provisional Government of Hawaii. Following the January 1893 coup that deposed Liliʻuokalani, many royalists were preparing to overthrow the white-led Republic of Hawaiʻi oligarchy. Hundreds of rifles were covertly shipped to Hawaii and hidden in caves nearby. As armed troops came and went, a Republic of Hawaiʻi patrol discovered the rebel group. On January 6, 1895, gunfire began on both sides and later the rebels were surrounded and captured. Over the next 10 days several skirmishes occurred, until the last armed opposition surrendered or were captured. The Republic of Hawaiʻi took 123 troops into custody as prisoners of war. The mass arrest of nearly 300 more men and women, including Queen Liliʻuokalani, as political prisoners was intended to incapacitate the political resistance against the ruling oligarchy. In March 1895, a military tribunal convicted 170 prisoners of treason and sentenced six troops to be "hung by the neck" until dead, according to historian Ronald Williams Jr. The other prisoners were variously sentenced to from five to thirty-five years' imprisonment at hard labor, while those convicted of lesser charges received sentences from six months' to six years' imprisonment at hard labor. The queen was sentenced to five years in prison, but spent eight months under house arrest until she was released on parole. The total number of arrests related to the 1895 Kaua Kūloko was 406 people on a summary list of statistics, published by the government of the Republic of Hawaiʻi.

The administration of President Grover Cleveland commissioned the Blount Report, which concluded that the removal of Liliʻuokalani had been illegal. Commissioner Blount found the U.S. and its minister guilty on all counts including the overthrow, the landing of the marines, and the recognition of the provisional government. In a message to Congress, Cleveland wrote:

And finally, but for the lawless occupation of Honolulu under false pretexts by the United States forces, and but for Minister Stevens' recognition of the provisional government when the United States forces were its sole support and constituted its only military strength, the Queen and her Government would never have yielded to the provisional government, even for a time and for the sole purpose of submitting her case to the enlightened justice of the United States. By an act of war, committed with the participation of a diplomatic representative of the United States and without authority of Congress, the Government of a feeble but friendly and confiding people has been overthrown. A substantial wrong has thus been done which a due regard for our national character as well as the rights of the injured people requires we should endeavor to repair. The provisional government has not assumed a republican or other constitutional form, but has remained a mere executive council or oligarchy, set up without the assent of the people. It has not sought to find a permanent basis of popular support and has given no evidence of an intention to do so.

The U.S. government first demanded that Queen Liliʻuokalani be reinstated, but the Provisional Government refused. On December 23, 1893, the response from the Provisional Government of Hawaii, authored by President Sanford B. Dole, was received by Cleveland's representative Minister Albert S. Willis and emphasized that the Provisional Government of Hawaii "unhesitatingly" rejected the demand from the Cleveland Administration.

Congress conducted an independent investigation, and on February 26, 1894, submitted the Morgan Report, which found all parties, including Stevens—with the exception of the queen—"not guilty" and not responsible for the coup. Partisans on both sides of the debate questioned the accuracy and impartiality of both the Blount and Morgan reports over the events of 1893.

In 1993, Congress passed a joint Apology Resolution regarding the overthrow; it was signed by President Bill Clinton. The resolution apologized and said that the overthrow was illegal in the following phrase: "The Congress—on the occasion of the 100th anniversary of the illegal overthrow of the Kingdom of Hawaiʻi on January 17, 1893, acknowledges the historical significance of this event which resulted in the suppression of the inherent sovereignty of the Native Hawaiian people." The Apology Resolution also "acknowledges that the overthrow of the Kingdom of Hawaiʻi occurred with the active participation of agents and citizens of the United States and further acknowledges that the Native Hawaiian people never directly relinquished to the United States their claims to their inherent sovereignty as a people over their national lands, either through the Kingdom of Hawaiʻi or through a plebiscite or referendum".

=== Annexation – Territory of Hawaiʻi (1898–1959) ===
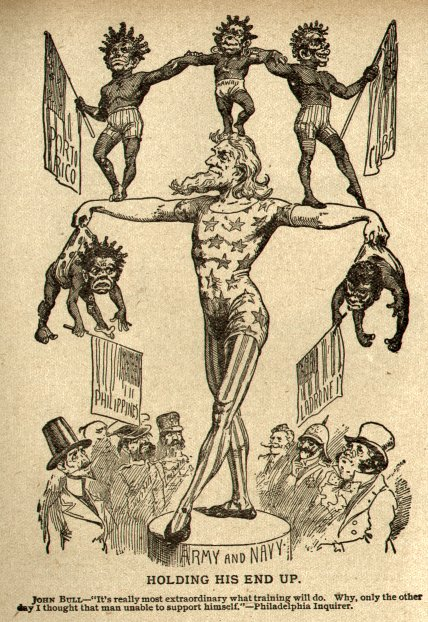
In 1899 Uncle Sam balances his new possessions, which are racistly depicted in the pickaninny stereotype; the figures are Puerto Rico, Hawaii, Cuba, Philippines and "Ladrones" (the Mariana Islands, including Guam).

After William McKinley won the 1896 U.S. presidential election, advocates pressed to annex the Republic of Hawaiʻi. The previous president, Grover Cleveland, was a friend of Queen Liliʻuokalani. McKinley was open to persuasion by U.S. expansionists and by annexationists from Hawaiʻi. He met with three non-native annexationists: Lorrin A. Thurston, Francis March Hatch and William Ansel Kinney. After negotiations in June 1897, Secretary of State John Sherman agreed to a treaty of annexation with these representatives of the Republic of Hawaiʻi.

The majority of Native Hawaiians vociferously opposed annexation and found a spokesperson in former queen Liliʻuokalani. Opposition crystallized around the Kūʻē Petition drive of 1897, in which 21,269 signatures opposing annexation were procured by members of Hui Aloha ʻĀina (Hawaiian Patriotic League). These petitions were hand-carried to Washington and delivered to the United States Senate by a commission of Native Hawaiian delegates. The petition swayed several key votes and contributed to the Senate's ultimately voting against ratification of the treaty.

However, in 1898, the Newlands Resolution was introduced in the US House of Representatives. The resolution would legalize the annexation of the Republic of Hawaii to the United States, becoming the Territory of Hawaiʻi. The Newlands Resolution was passed by the House on June 15, 1898, by a vote of 209 to 91 and by the Senate on July 6, 1898, by a vote of 42 to 21. It was then signed into law by president McKinley.

In 1900, Hawaiʻi was granted self-governance and retained ʻIolani Palace as the territorial capitol building. Despite several attempts to become a state, Hawaii remained a territory for 60 years. Plantation owners and capitalists, who maintained control through financial institutions such as the Big Five, found territorial status convenient because they remained able to import cheap, foreign labor. Such immigration and labor practices were prohibited in many states.

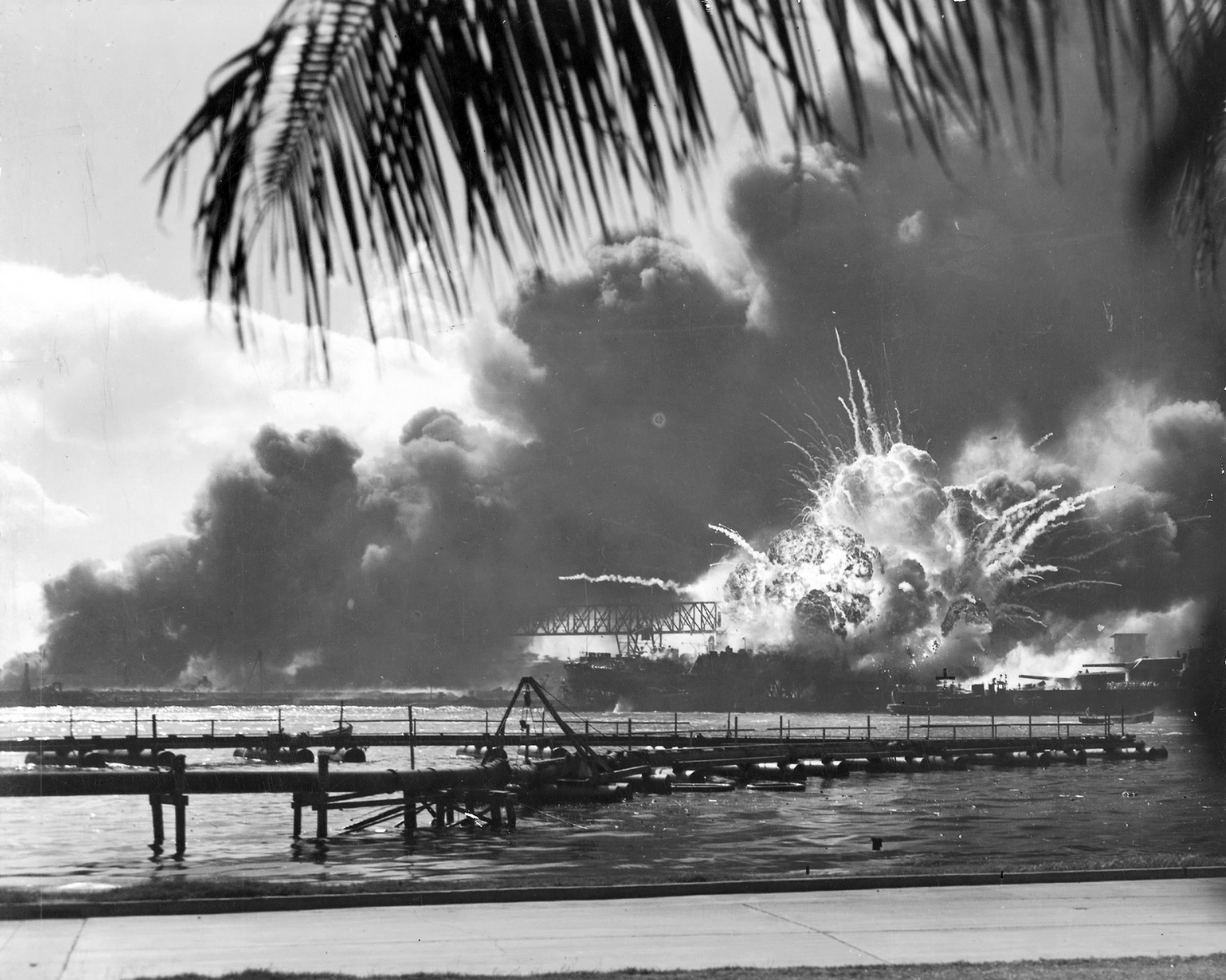
The Japanese attack on Pearl Harbor in 1941 was the primary event which caused the United States to enter World War II.

Puerto Rican immigration to Hawaiʻi began in 1899, when Puerto Rico's sugar industry was devastated by a hurricane, causing a worldwide shortage of sugar and a huge demand for sugar from Hawaiʻi. Hawaiian sugarcane plantation owners began to recruit experienced, unemployed laborers in Puerto Rico. Two waves of Korean immigration to Hawaiʻi occurred in the 20th century. The first wave arrived between 1903 and 1924; the second wave began in 1965 after President Lyndon B. Johnson signed the Immigration and Nationality Act of 1965, which removed racial and national barriers and resulted in significantly altering the demographic mix in the U.S.

Oʻahu was the target of a surprise attack on Pearl Harbor by the Empire of Japan on December 7, 1941. The attack on Pearl Harbor and other military and naval installations, carried out by aircraft and by midget submarines, brought the United States into World War II.

=== Political changes of 1954 – State of Hawaiʻi (1959–present) ===
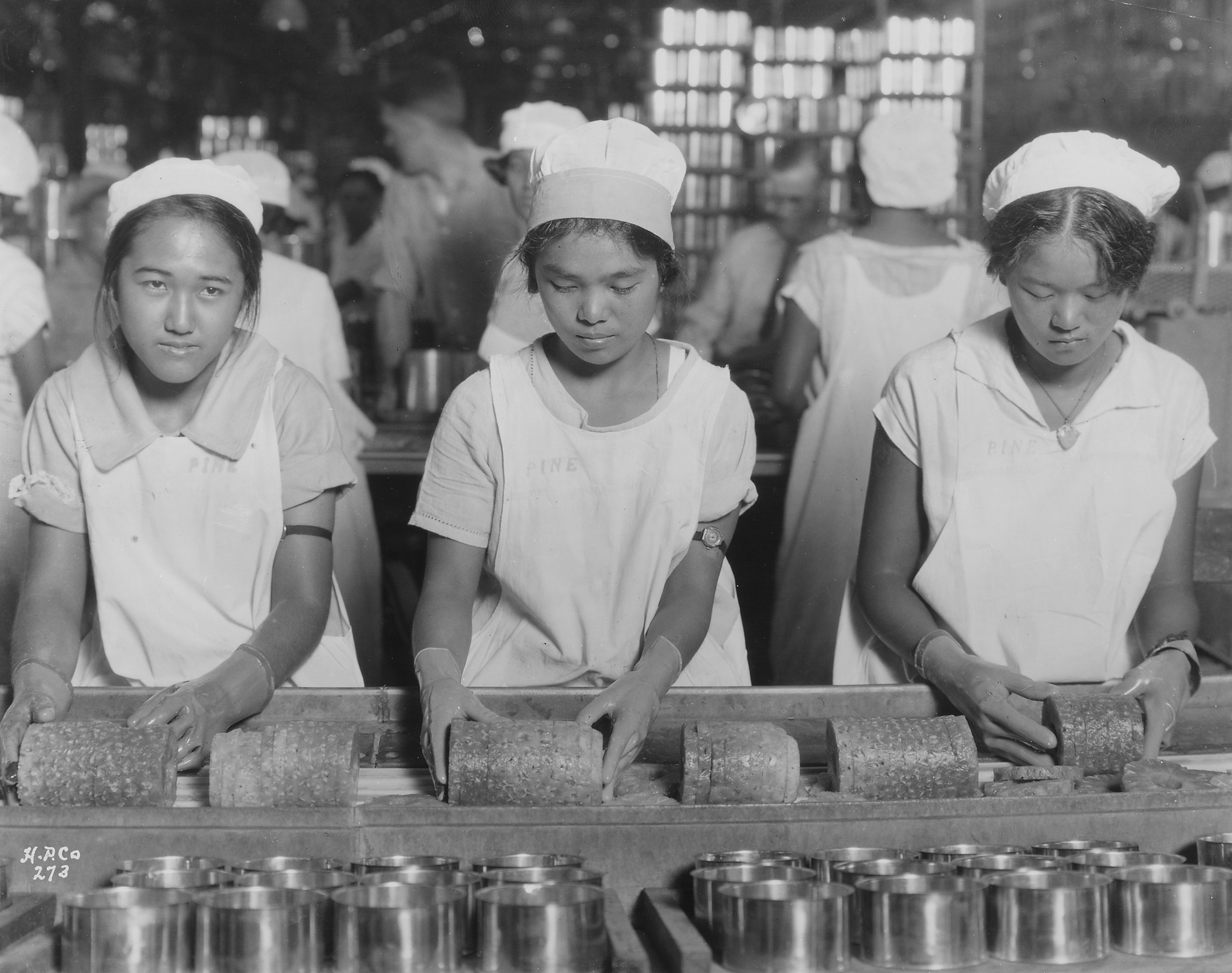
Prior to the postwar labor movement, Hawaii was governed by plantation owners. Here, three young women pack pineapples into cans in 1928.

In the 1950s, the plantation owners' power was broken by the descendants of immigrant laborers, who were born in Hawaiʻi and were U.S. citizens. They voted against the Hawaiʻi Republican Party, strongly supported by plantation owners. The new majority voted for the Democratic Party of Hawaiʻi, which dominated territorial and state politics for more than 40 years. Eager to gain full representation in Congress and the Electoral College, residents actively campaigned for statehood. In Washington, there was talk that Hawaiʻi would be a Republican Party stronghold. As a result, the admission of Hawaii was matched with the admission of Alaska, which was seen as a Democratic Party stronghold. These predictions proved inaccurate; as of 2017, Hawaiʻi almost always votes Democratic, while Alaska typically votes Republican.

During the Cold War, Hawaiʻi became an important site for U.S. cultural diplomacy, military training, research, and as a staging ground for the U.S. war in Vietnam.

In March 1959, Congress passed the Hawaiʻi Admissions Act, which U.S. President Dwight D. Eisenhower signed into law. The act excluded Palmyra Atoll from statehood; it had been part of the Kingdom and Territory of Hawaiʻi. On June 27, 1959, a referendum asked residents of Hawaiʻi to vote on the statehood bill; 94.3% voted in favor of statehood and 5.7% opposed it. The referendum asked voters to choose between accepting the Act and remaining a U.S. territory. The United Nations' Special Committee on Decolonization later removed Hawaiʻi from its list of non-self-governing territories.

After attaining statehood, Hawaiʻi quickly modernized through construction and a rapidly growing tourism economy. Later, state programs promoted Hawaiian culture. The Hawaiʻi State Constitutional Convention of 1978 created institutions such as the Office of Hawaiian Affairs to promote indigenous language and culture.

== Demographics ==
=== Population ===
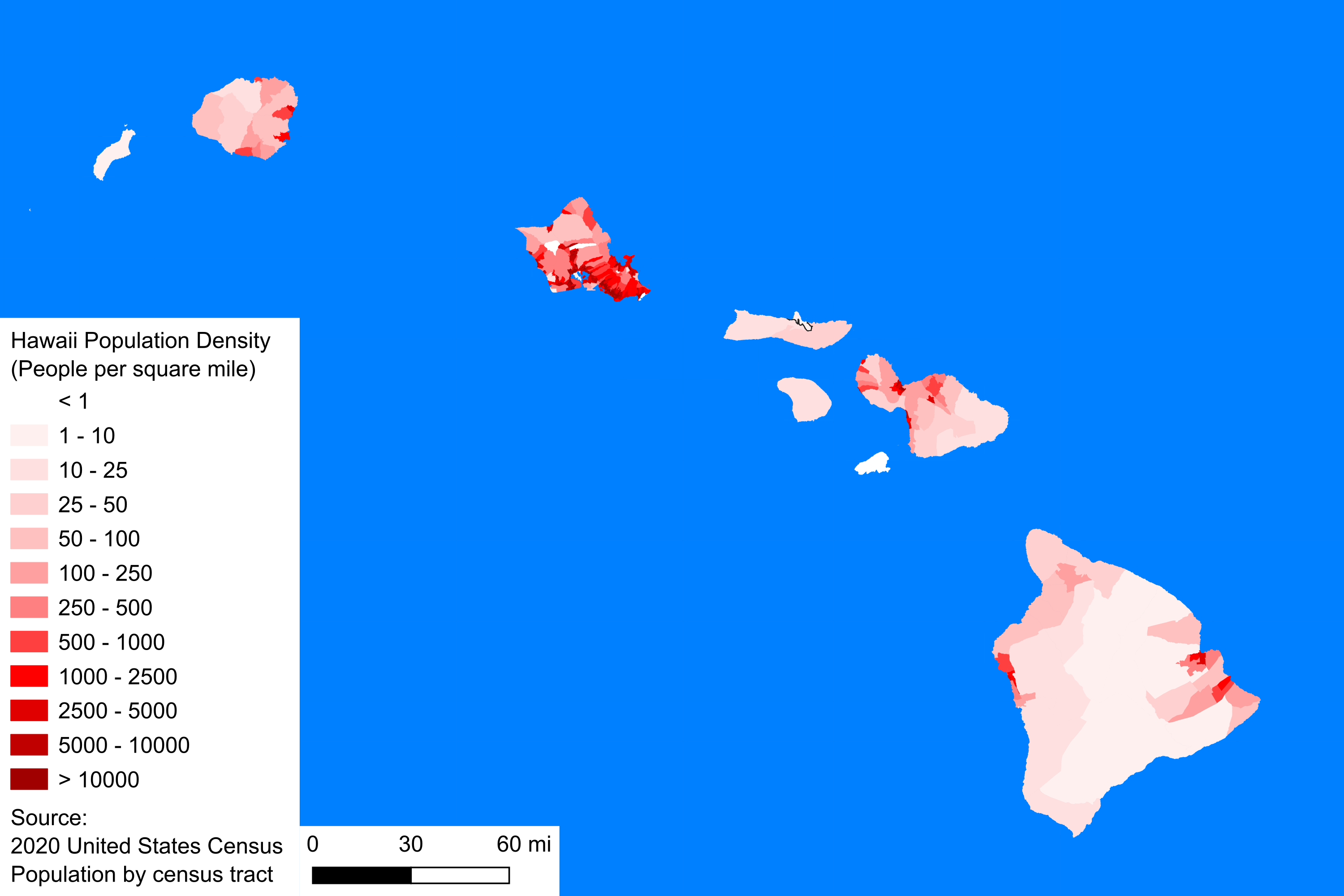
Population density map of Hawaii, 2020

Historical population
Census	Pop.	Note	%±
1850	84,165		—
1860	69,800		−17.1%
1890	89,990		—
1900	154,001		71.1%
1910	191,909		24.6%
1920	255,912		33.4%
1930	368,336		43.9%
1940	423,330		14.9%
1950	499,794		18.1%
1960	632,772		26.6%
1970	768,561		21.5%
1980	964,691		25.5%
1990	1,108,229		14.9%
2000	1,211,537		9.3%
2010	1,360,301		12.3%
2020	1,455,271		7.0%
2025 (est.)	1,432,820	1910–2020 2024	−1.5%
1778 (est.) = 300000, 1819 (est.) = 145000, 1835–1836 = 107954, 1872 = 56897, 1884 = 80578, 1896 = 109020

After Europeans and mainland Americans first arrived during the Kingdom of Hawaii period, the overall population of Hawaii—which until that time composed solely of Indigenous Hawaiians—fell dramatically. Many people of the Indigenous Hawaiian population died to foreign diseases, declining from an estimated 300,000 in the 1770s, to 60,000 in the 1850s, to 24,000 in 1920. Other estimates for the pre-contact population range from 150,000 to 1.5 million. The population of Hawaii began to finally increase after an influx of primarily Asian settlers that arrived as migrant laborers at the end of the 19th century. In 1923, 42% of the population was of Japanese descent, 9% of Chinese descent, and 16% Native Hawaiian descent.

Hawaii's population has shown a slight decline since 2020. The increasing cost of living and needing to import supplies is cited as the top reason for relocating to the U.S. mainland, followed by climate change, including more drought, wildfires, as well as rising seas. In 2010, 156,000 residents declared themselves to be solely of Native Hawaiian ancestry, just over half the estimated pre-contact population. An additional 371,000 declared themselves to possess Native Hawaiian ancestry in combination with one or more other races (including other Polynesian groups, but mostly Asian or White).

In 2018, the United States Census Bureau estimated the population of Hawaii to be 1,420,491, a decrease of 7,047 from the previous year but an increase of 60,190 (4.42%) since 2010. This includes a natural increase of 48,111 (96,028 births minus 47,917 deaths) and an increase due to net migration of 16,956 people into the state. Immigration from outside the United States resulted in a net increase of 30,068; migration within the country produced a net loss of 13,112 people.

The center of population of Hawaii is located on the island of Oʻahu. Large numbers of Native Hawaiians have moved to Las Vegas, which has been called the "ninth island" of Hawaii.

Hawaii has a de facto population of over 1.4 million, due in part to a large number of military personnel and tourist residents. Oʻahu is the most populous island, and has the highest population density with a resident population of just under one million in 597 square miles (1,546 km^{2}), approximately 1,650 people per square mile. (Note: For comparison, New Jersey—which has 8,717,925 people in 7,417 square miles (19,210 km^{2})—is the most-densely populated state in the Union with 1,134 people per square mile.) Hawaii's 1.4 million residents, spread across 6,000 square miles (15,500 km^{2}) of land, result in an average population density of 188.6 persons per square mile. The state has a lower population density than Ohio and Illinois.

The average projected lifespan of people born in Hawaii in 2000 is 79.8 years; 77.1 years if male, 82.5 if female—longer than the average lifespan of any other U.S. state. As of 2011 the U.S. military reported it had 42,371 personnel on the islands.

According to HUD's 2022 Annual Homeless Assessment Report, there were an estimated 5,967 homeless people in Hawaii.

In 2018, the top countries of origin for immigrants in Hawaii were the Philippines, China, Japan, Korea, and the Marshall Islands.

=== Ancestry ===
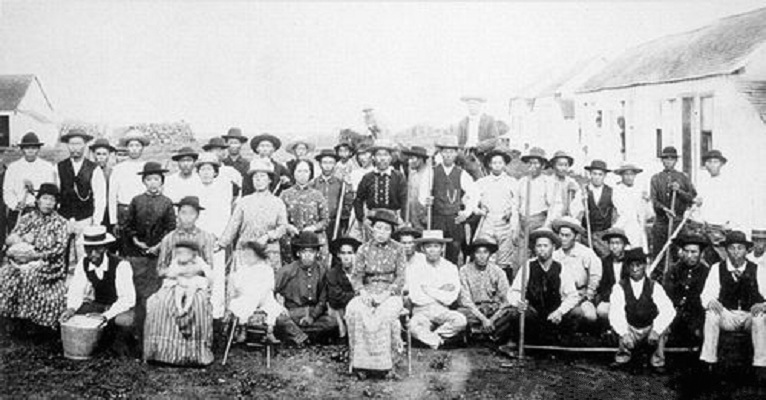
Japanese immigration to Hawaii was largely fueled by the high demand for plantation labor in Hawaii post-annexation.

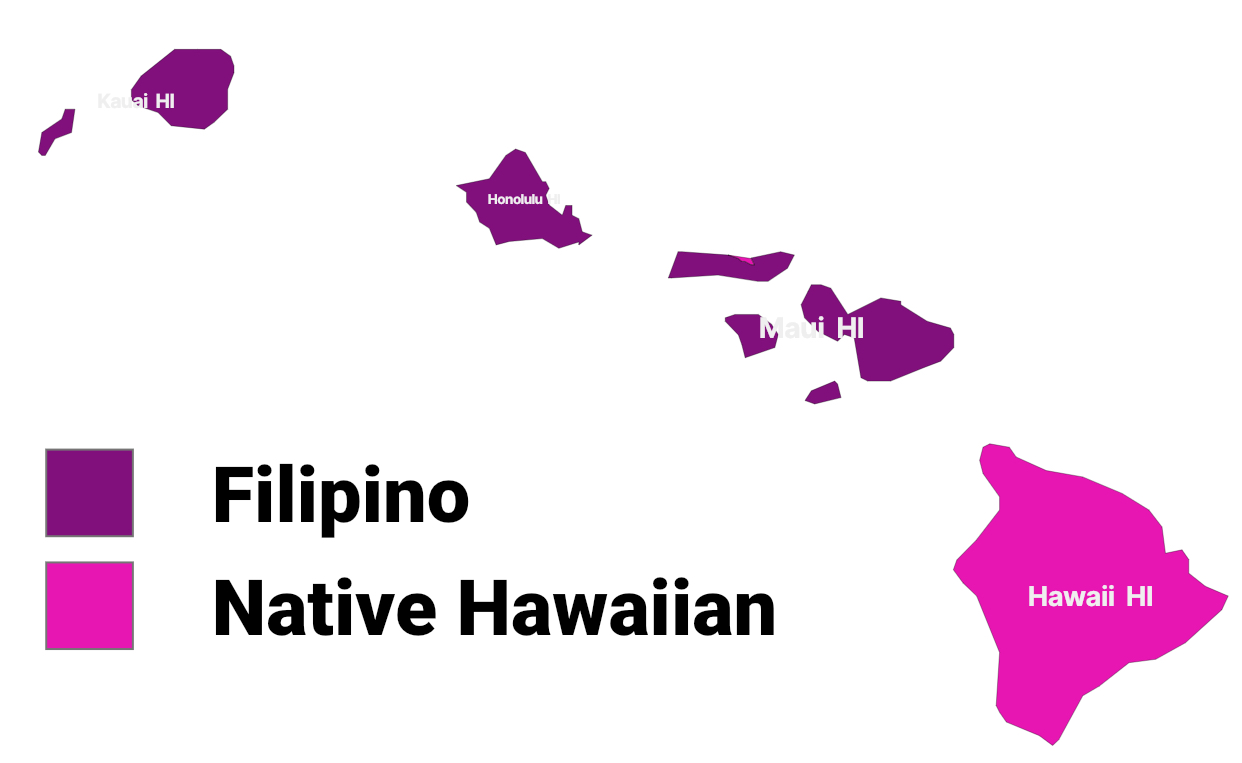
Largest alone or in any combination ethnic origin by county in Hawaii, per the 2020 census

According to the 2020 United States Census, Hawaii had a population of 1,455,271. The state's population identified as 37.2% Asian; 25.3% Multiracial; 22.9% White; 10.8% Native Hawaiians and other Pacific Islanders; 9.5% Hispanic and Latinos of any race; 1.6% Black or African American; 1.8% from some other race; and 0.3% Native American and Alaskan Native.

Hawaii – Racial and ethnic composition Note: the U.S. Census treats Hispanic/Latino as an ethnic category. This table excludes Latinos from the racial categories and assigns them to a separate category. Hispanics/Latinos may be of any race.
Race / Ethnicity (NH = Non-Hispanic)	Pop 2000	Pop 2010	Pop 2020	% 2000	% 2010	% 2020
White alone (NH)	277,091	309,343	314,365	22.87%	22.74%	21.60%
Black or African American alone (NH)	20,829	19,904	21,877	1.72%	1.46%	1.50%
Native American or Alaska Native alone (NH)	2,539	2,823	2,321	0.21%	0.21%	0.16%
Asian alone (NH)	494,149	513,294	531,558	40.79%	37.73%	36.53%
Pacific Islander alone (NH)	108,441	128,222	149,054	8.95%	9.43%	10.24%
Other race alone (NH)	2,089	1,888	5,283	0.17%	0.14%	0.36%
Mixed race or Multiracial (NH)	218,700	263,985	291,890	18.05%	19.41%	20.06%
Hispanic or Latino (any race)	87,699	120,842	138,923	7.24%	8.88%	9.55%
Total	1,211,537	1,360,301	1,455,271	100.00%	100.00%	100.00%

Hawaii racial breakdown of population
Racial composition	1970	1980	1990	2000	2010	2020
White	38.8%	33.0%	33.4%	24.3%	24.7%	22.9%
Asian	57.7%	60.5%	61.8%	41.6%	38.6%	37.2%
Native Hawaiian and other Pacific Islander	57.7%	60.5%	61.8%	9.4%	10.0%	10.8%
Black	1.0%	1.8%	2.5%	1.8%	1.6%	1.6%
Native American and Alaskan Native	0.1%	0.3%	0.5%	0.3%	0.3%	0.3%
Other race	2.4%	4.4%	1.9%	1.2%	1.2%	1.8%
Two or more races	–	–	–	21.4%	23.6%	25.3%

Hawaii has the highest percentage of Asian Americans and multiracial Americans and the lowest percentage of White Americans of any state. It is the only state where people who identify as Asian Americans are the largest ethnic group. In 2012, 14.5% of the resident population under age 1 was non-Hispanic white. Hawaii's Asian population consists mainly of 198,000 (14.6%) Filipino Americans, 185,000 (13.6%) Japanese Americans, roughly 55,000 (4.0%) Chinese Americans, and 24,000 (1.8%) Korean Americans.

Over 120,000 (8.8%) Hispanic and Latino Americans live in Hawaii. Mexican Americans number over 35,000 (2.6%); Puerto Ricans exceed 44,000 (3.2%). Multiracial Americans constitute almost 25% of Hawaii's population, exceeding 320,000 people. Hawaii is the only state to have a tri-racial group as its largest multiracial group, one that includes white, Asian and Native Hawaiian/Pacific Islander (22% of all multiracial population). The non-Hispanic White population numbers around 310,000—just over 20% of the population. The multi-racial population outnumbers the non-Hispanic white population by about 10,000 people. In 1970, the Census Bureau reported Hawaii's population was 38.8% white and 57.7% Asian and Pacific Islander.

There are more than 80,000 Indigenous Hawaiians—5.9% of the population. Including those with partial ancestry, Samoan Americans constitute 2.8% of Hawaii's population, and Tongan Americans constitute 0.6%.

The five largest European ancestries in Hawaii are German (7.4%), Irish (5.2%), English (4.6%), Portuguese (4.3%) and Italian (2.7%). About 82.2% of the state's residents were born in the United States. Roughly 75% of foreign-born residents originate from Asia. Hawaii is a majority-minority state. It was expected to be one of three states that would not have a non-Hispanic white plurality in 2014; the other two are California and New Mexico.

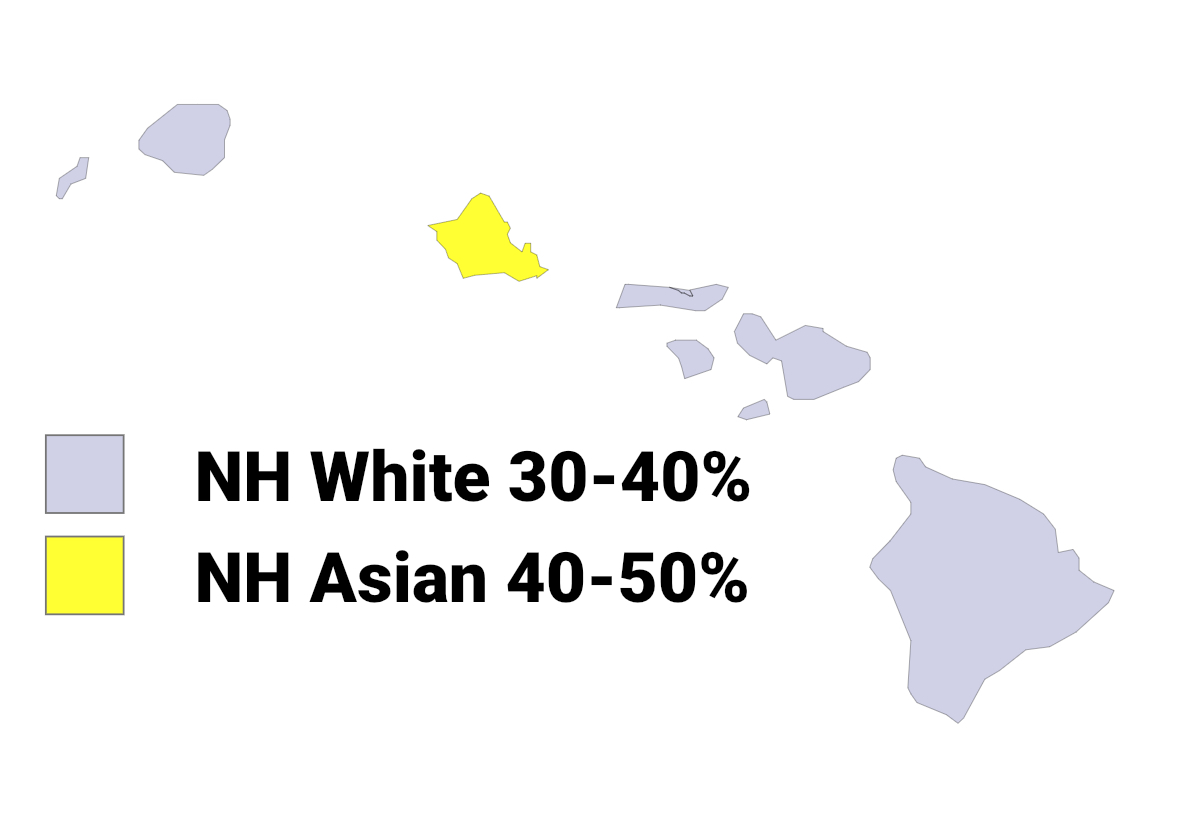
Map of counties in Hawaii by racial and ethnic plurality, per the 2020 U.S. census

Population of Hawaii (2008)
Ancestry	Percentage	Main article
Filipino	13.6%	See Filipinos in Hawaii
Japanese	12.6%	See Japanese in Hawaii
Polynesian	9.0%	See Native Hawaiians
Germans	7.4%	See German American
Irish	5.2%	See Irish American
English	4.6%	See English American
Portuguese	4.3%	See Portuguese in Hawaii
Chinese	4.1%	See Chinese in Hawaii
Korean	3.1%	See Korean American
Mexican	2.9%	See Mexican American
Puerto Rican	2.8%	See Puerto Ricans in Hawaii
Italian	2.7%	See Italian American
African	2.4%	See African American
French	1.7%	See French American
Samoan	1.3%	See Samoans in Hawaii
Scottish	1.2%	See Scottish American

The third group of foreigners to arrive in Hawaii were from China. Chinese workers on Western trading ships settled in Hawaii starting in 1789. In 1820, the first American missionaries arrived to preach Christianity and teach the Hawaiians Western ways. As of 2015, a large proportion of Hawaii's population have Asian ancestry—especially Filipino, Japanese and Chinese. Many are descendants of immigrants brought to work on the sugarcane plantations in the mid-to-late 19th century. The first 153 Japanese immigrants arrived in Hawaii on June 19, 1868. They were not approved by the then-current Japanese government because the contract was between a broker and the Tokugawa shogunate—by then replaced by the Meiji Restoration. The first Japanese current-government-approved immigrants arrived on February 9, 1885, after Kalākaua's petition to Emperor Meiji when Kalākaua visited Japan in 1881.

Almost 13,000 Portuguese migrants had arrived by 1899; they also worked on the sugarcane plantations. By 1901, more than 5,000 Puerto Ricans were living in Hawaii.

=== Languages ===
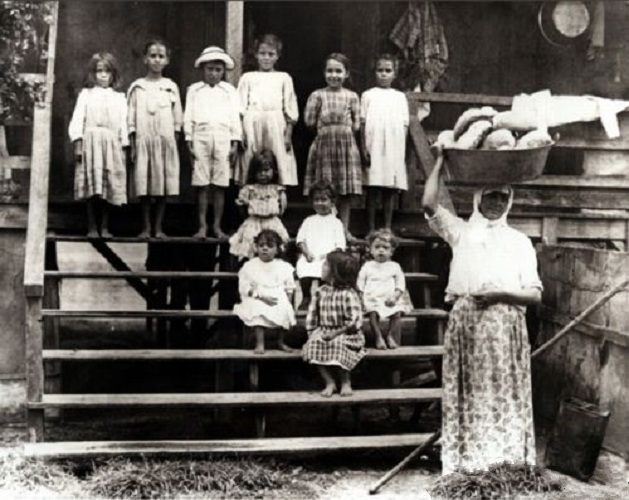
Many Portuguese immigrants were Azorean or Madeiran. They brought with them Catholicism and Portuguese language and cuisine.

English and Hawaiian are listed as Hawaii's official languages in the state's 1978 constitution, in Article XV, Section 4. However, the use of Hawaiian is limited because the constitution specifies that "Hawaiian shall be required for public acts and transactions only as provided by law". Hawaiʻi Creole English, locally referred to as "Pidgin", is the native language of many native residents and is a second language for many others.

The 2000 Census found that 73.4% of Hawaii residents age 5 and older exclusively spoke English at home. According to the 2008 American Community Survey, 74.6% of Hawaii's residents older than 5 spoke only English at home. In their homes, 21.0% of state residents speak an additional Asian language, 2.6% speak Spanish, 1.6% speak other Indo-European languages and 0.2% speak another language.

After English, other languages popularly spoken in the state are Tagalog, Ilocano, and Japanese. 5.4% of residents speak Tagalog, which includes non-native speakers of Filipino, a Tagalog-based national and co-official language of the Philippines; 5.0% speak Japanese and 4.0% speak Ilocano; 1.2% speak Chinese, 1.7% speak Hawaiian; 1.7% speak Spanish; 1.6% speak Korean; and 1.0% speak Samoan.

==== Hawaiian ====
The Hawaiian language has about 2,000 native speakers, about 0.15% of the total population. According to the United States Census, there were more than 24,000 total speakers of the language in Hawaii in 2006–2008. Hawaiian is a Polynesian member of the Austronesian language family. It is closely related to other Polynesian languages, such as Marquesan, Tahitian, Māori, Rapa Nui (the language of Easter Island), and less closely to Samoan and Tongan.

According to Schütz, the Marquesans colonized the archipelago in roughly 300 CE and were later followed by waves of seafarers from the Society Islands, Samoa and Tonga. These Polynesians remained in the islands; they eventually became the Hawaiian people and their languages evolved into the Hawaiian language. Kimura and Wilson say: "[l]inguists agree that Hawaiian is closely related to Eastern Polynesian, with a particularly strong link in the Southern Marquesas, and a secondary link in Tahiti, which may be explained by voyaging between the Hawaiian and Society Islands".

Before the arrival of Captain James Cook, the Hawaiian language had no written form. That form was developed mainly by American Protestant missionaries between 1820 and 1826 who assigned to the Hawaiian phonemes letters from the Latin alphabet. Interest in Hawaiian increased significantly in the late 20th century. With the help of the Office of Hawaiian Affairs, specially designated immersion schools in which all subjects would be taught in Hawaiian were established. The University of Hawaiʻi developed a Hawaiian-language graduate studies program. Municipal codes were altered to favor Hawaiian place and street names for new civic developments.

Hawaiian distinguishes between long and short vowel sounds. In modern practice, vowel length is indicated with a macron (kahakō). Hawaiian-language newspapers (nūpepa) published from 1834 to 1948 and traditional native speakers of Hawaiian generally omit the marks in their own writing. The ʻokina and kahakō are intended to capture the proper pronunciation of Hawaiian words. The Hawaiian language uses the glottal stop (ʻOkina) as a consonant. It is written as a symbol similar to the apostrophe or left-hanging (opening) single quotation mark.

The keyboard layout used for Hawaiian is QWERTY.

==== Hawaiian Pidgin ====
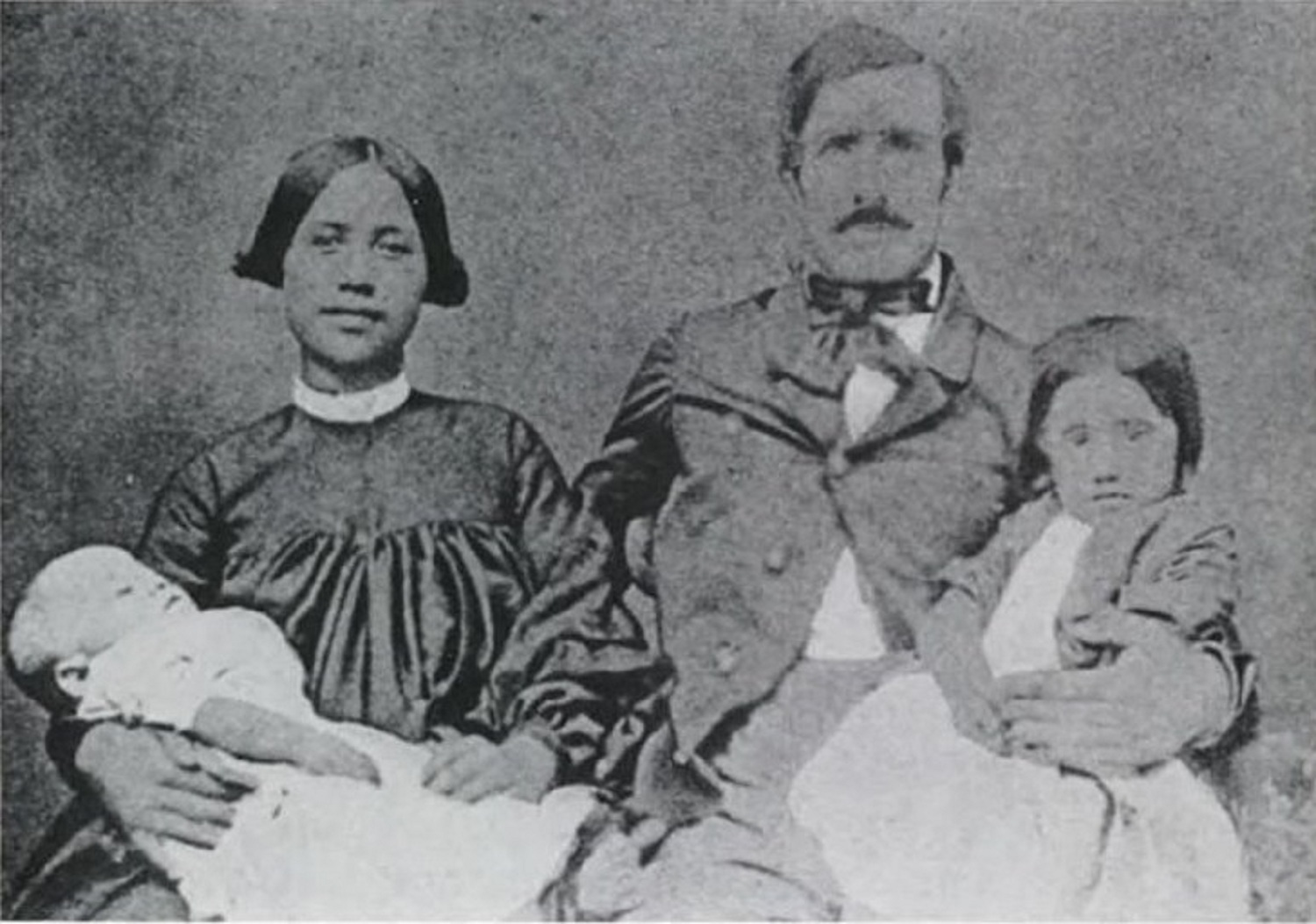
Mixed Hawaiian/European-American family in Honolulu, 1850s

Hawaiian Pidgin, officially known as Hawaiʻi Creole English (HCE), is a creole language that emerged in Hawaiʻi during the 19th century as a means of communication among diverse groups working on sugarcane plantations. Its lexicon is primarily derived from English, with significant contributions from Hawaiian, Chinese, Japanese, Portuguese, Ilocano, and Tagalog.

The development of Hawaiian Pidgin began with Pidgin Hawaiian, an earlier pidgin that formed in the 1790s during initial contact between Native Hawaiians and foreigners. As plantation laborers from various countries arrived, a new pidgin based on English evolved to facilitate communication among workers and supervisors.

By the early 20th century, children of these plantation workers began acquiring Hawaiian Pidgin as their first language, leading to its creolization. This transition marked the emergence of HCE as a fully developed creole language.

HCE incorporates Hawaiian words, especially in place names and terms for local flora and fauna. For instance, the Hawaiian term for tuna, "ahi," is commonly used in HCE. Additionally, certain English words have adapted meanings; "aunty" and "uncle" are used to address any respected elder, regardless of familial relation.

Some expressions from HCE have permeated other communities, particularly through surfing culture. Terms like "brah" (brother) and "da kine" (a versatile placeholder term) have gained recognition beyond Hawaiʻi.

In 2015, the U.S. Census Bureau recognized Hawaiian Pidgin as an official language in Hawaiʻi, reflecting its widespread use among residents. Despite this recognition, debates continue about its role in education and its impact on learning Standard English.

==== Hawaiʻi Sign Language ====
Hawaiʻi Sign Language, a sign language for the Deaf based on the Hawaiian language, has been in use in the islands since the early 1800s. It is dwindling in numbers due to American Sign Language supplanting HSL through schooling and various other domains.

=== Religion ===
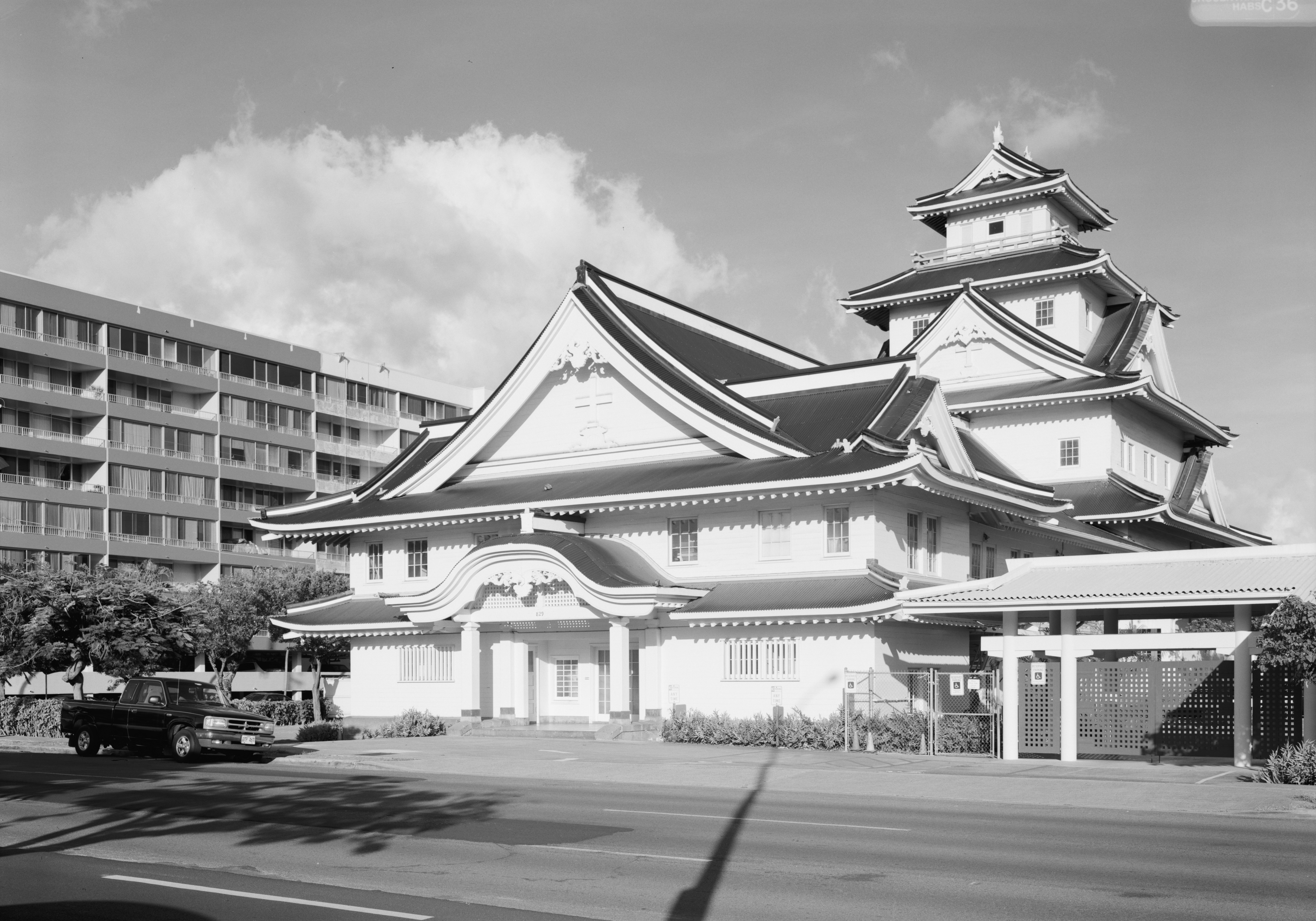
The style of architecture for the Makiki Christian Church in Honolulu heavily draws upon Japanese architecture.

Religious self-identification, per Public Religion Research Institute's 2022 American Values Survey
1. Protestantism (42.0%)
2. Catholicism (13.0%)
3. Mormonism (1.00%)
4. Unaffiliated (37.0%)
5. Buddhism (4.00%)
6. Other (3.00%)
Religion in Hawaii (2014)
1. Protestantism (38.0%)
2. Catholicism (20.0%)
3. Mormonism (3.00%)
4. Jehovah's Witnesses (1.00%)
5. Other Christian (1.00%)
6. No religion (26.0%)
7. Buddhism (8.00%)
8. Other religion (2.00%)
9. Don't know (1.00%)

Hawaii is among the most religiously diverse states in the U.S., with one in ten residents practicing a non-Christian faith. Roughly one-quarter to half the population identify as unaffiliated and nonreligious, making Hawaii one of the most secular states as well.

Christianity remains the majority religion, represented mainly by various Protestant groups and Catholicism. The second-largest religion is Buddhism, which comprises a larger proportion of the population than in any other state; it is concentrated in the Japanese community. Native Hawaiians continue to engage in traditional religious and spiritual practices today, often adhering to Christian and traditional beliefs at the same time.

The Cathedral Church of Saint Andrew in Honolulu was formally the seat of the Hawaiian Reformed Catholic Church, a province of the Anglican Communion that had been the state church of the Kingdom of Hawaii; it subsequently merged into the Episcopal Church in the 1890s following the overthrow of the Kingdom of Hawaii, becoming the seat of the Episcopal Diocese of Hawaii. The Cathedral Basilica of Our Lady of Peace and the Co-Cathedral of Saint Theresa of the Child Jesus serve as seats of the Diocese of Honolulu. The Eastern Orthodox community is centered around the Saints Constantine and Helen Greek Orthodox Cathedral of the Pacific.

The largest religious denominations by membership were the Catholic Church with 249,619 adherents in 2010; the Church of Jesus Christ of Latter-day Saints with 68,128 adherents in 2009; the United Church of Christ with 115 congregations and 20,000 members; and the Southern Baptist Convention with 108 congregations and 18,000 members. Nondenominational churches collectively have 128 congregations and 32,000 members.

According to data provided by religious establishments, religion in Hawaii in 2000 was distributed as follows:

- Christianity: 351,000 (29%)
- Buddhism: 110,000 (9%)
- Judaism: 10,000 (1%)
- Other: 100,000 (10%)
- Unaffiliated: 650,000 (51%)

However, a Pew poll found that the religious composition was as follows:

Religious affiliation in Hawaii (2014)
Affiliation	% of Hawaiʻi's population
Christian	63
Protestant	38
Evangelical Protestant	25
Mainline Protestant	11
Black church	2
Catholic	20
Mormon	3
Jehovah's Witnesses	1
Eastern Orthodox	0.5
Other Christian	1
Unaffiliated	26
Nothing in particular	20
Agnostic	5
Atheist	2
Non-Christian faiths	10
Jewish	0.5
Muslim	0.5
Buddhist	8
Hindu	0.5
Other Non-Christian faiths	0.5
Don't know	1
Total	100

=== Births data ===
Note: Births in this table do not add up, because Hispanic peoples are counted both by their ethnicity and by their race, giving a higher overall number.

Live births by single race/ethnicity of mother
Race	2014	2015	2016	2017	2018	2019	2020	2021	2022	2023	2024
Asian	11,535 (62.2%)	11,443 (62.1%)	4,616 (25.6%)	4,653 (26.6%)	4,366 (25.7%)	4,330 (25.8%)	3,940 (25.0%)	3,851 (24.6%)	3,854 (24.8%)	3,524 (23.8%)	3,540 (23.7%)
White	4,881 (26.3%)	4,803 (26.1%)	3,649 (20.2%)	3,407 (19.4%)	3,288 (19.4%)	3,223 (19.2%)	3,060 (19.4%)	3,018 (19.3%)	2,896 (18.6%)	2,806 (18.9%)	2,818 (18.9%)
Pacific Islander	...	...	1,747 (9.7%)	1,684 (9.6%)	1,706 (10.1%)	1,695 (10.1%)	1,577 (10.0%)	1,371 (8.8%)	1,486 (9.6%)	1,396 (9.4%)	1,431 (9.6%)
Black	617 (3.3%)	620 (3.3%)	463 (2.6%)	406 (2.3%)	424 (2.5%)	429 (2.6%)	383 (2.4%)	342 (2.2%)	326 (2.1%)	313 (2.1%)	301 (2.0%)
Hispanic (any race)	2,764 (14.9%)	2,775 (15.1%)	2,766 (15.3%)	2,672 (15.3%)	2,580 (15.2%)	2,589 (15.4%)	2,623 (16.6%)	2,661 (17.0%)	2,701 (17.4%)	2,610 (17.6%)	2,697 (18.1%)
Total	18,550 (100%)	18,420 (100%)	18,059 (100%)	17,517 (100%)	16,972 (100%)	16,797 (100%)	15,785 (100%)	15,620 (100%)	15,535 (100%)	14,808 (100%)	14,917 (100%)

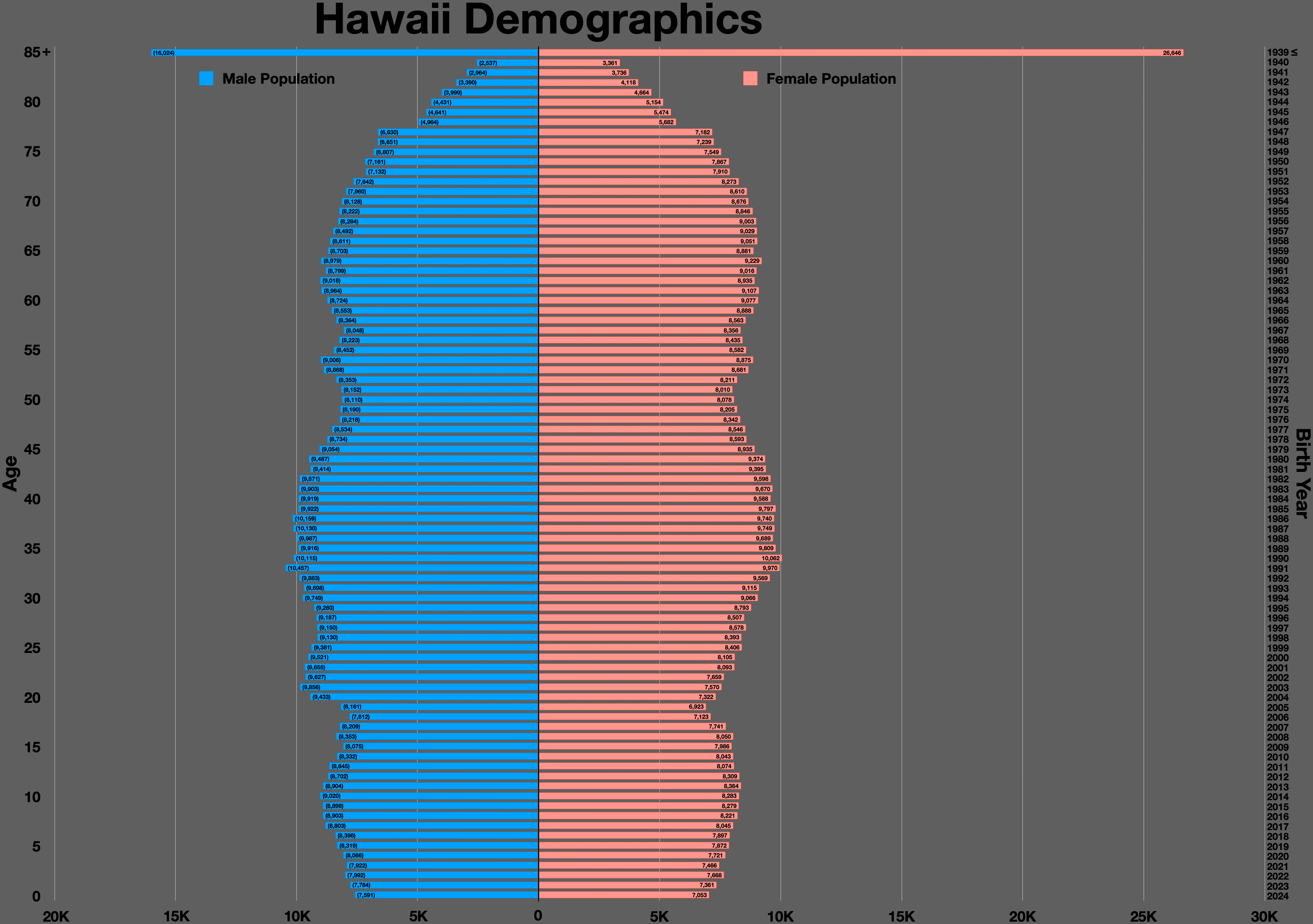
Hawaii population pyramid

1) Until 2016, data for births of Asian origin, included also births of the Pacific Islander group.
2) Since 2016, data for births of White Hispanic origin are not collected, but included in one Hispanic group; persons of Hispanic origin may be of any race.

=== Percentage surviving ===
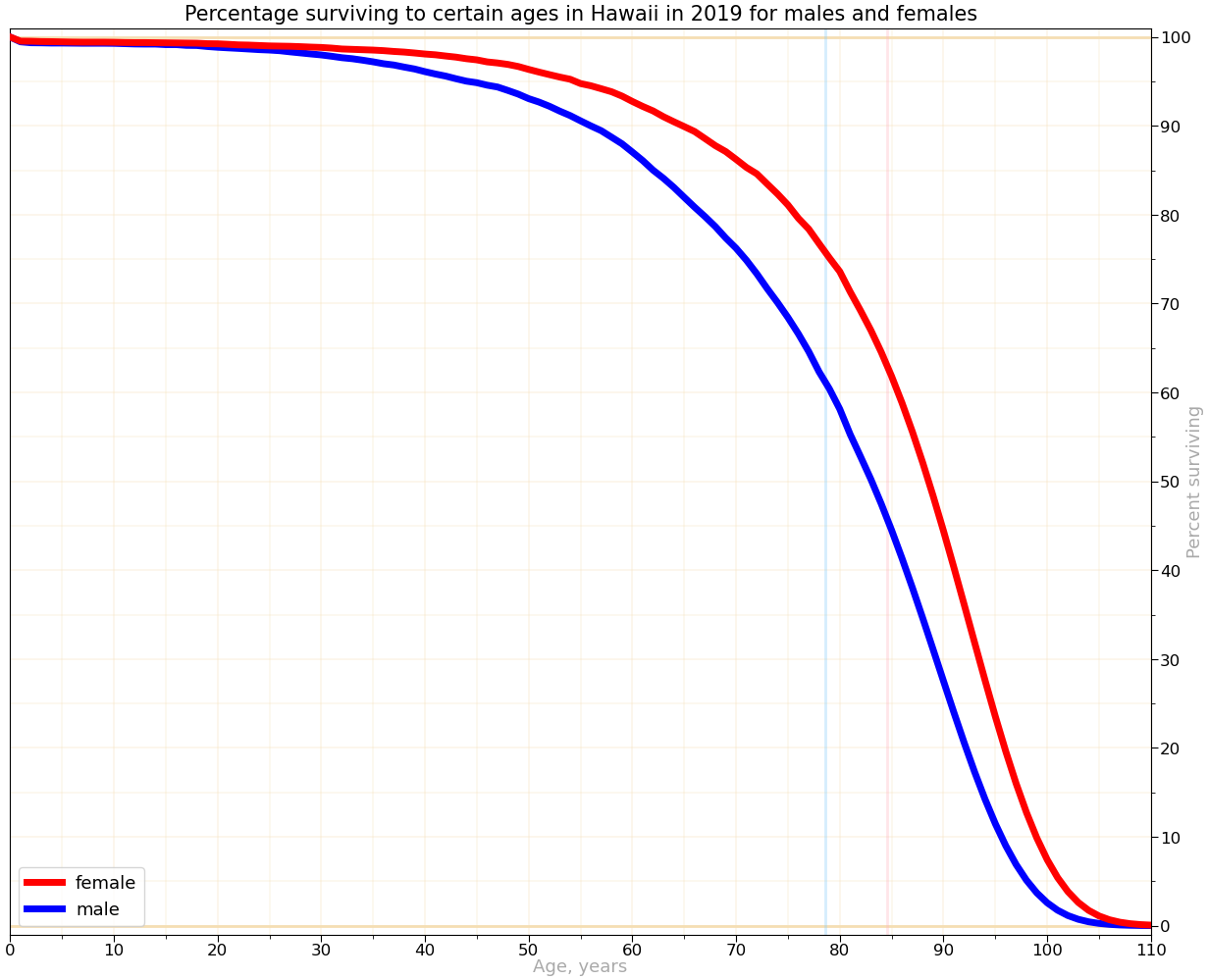
Percentage surviving to certain ages in Hawaii in 2019. Life expectancy in this state is one of the highest in the U.S.: before COVID-19 it was 81.60 years.

The percentage surviving, is the percent of the population that would survive to certain age, if their life conditions in a given year, were extrapolated to their whole life. Data for 2019.

Age	Percentage surviving		F / M
Age	male	female	F / M
1	99.5	99.5	1.00
5	99.3	99.5	1.00
10	99.3	99.4	1.00
15	99.1	99.3	1.00
20	98.8	99.2	1.00
25	98.5	99.0	1.00
30	98.0	98.8	1.01
35	97.2	98.5	1.01
40	96.1	98.1	1.02
45	94.9	97.4	1.03
50	93.1	96.4	1.04
55	90.6	94.8	1.05
60	87.1	92.7	1.07
65	82.0	89.9	1.10
70	76.2	86.2	1.13
75	68.4	81.1	1.19
80	58.1	73.6	1.27
85	44.5	61.8	1.39
90	27.5	44.4	1.61
95	11.5	23.5	2.05
100	2.576	7.425	2.88
105	0.253	1.090	4.31
110	0.010	0.063	6.30

Data source: US Mortality DataBase.

=== LGBTQ people ===
Hawaii has had a long history of LGBTQIA+ identities. Māhū ("in the middle") were a precolonial third gender with traditional spiritual and social roles, widely respected as healers. Homosexual relationships known as aikāne were widespread and normal in ancient Hawaiian society. Among men, aikāne relationships often began as teens and continued throughout their adult lives, even if they also maintained heterosexual partners. While aikāne usually refers to male homosexuality, some stories also refer to women, implying that women may have been involved in aikāne relationships as well. Journals written by Captain Cook's crew record that many aliʻi (hereditary nobles) also engaged in aikāne relationships, and Kamehameha the Great, the founder and first ruler of the Kingdom of Hawaii, was also known to participate. Cook's second lieutenant and co-astronomer James King observed that "all the chiefs had them", and recounts that Cook was actually asked by one chief to leave King behind, considering the role a great honor.

Hawaiian scholar Lilikalā Kameʻeleihiwa notes that aikāne served a practical purpose of building mutual trust and cohesion; "If you didn't sleep with a man, how could you trust him when you went into battle? How would you know if he was going to be the warrior that would protect you at all costs, if he wasn't your lover?"

As Western colonial influences intensified in the late 19th and early 20th century, the word aikāne was expurgated of its original sexual meaning, and in print simply meant "friend". Nonetheless, in Hawaiian language publications its metaphorical meaning can still mean either "friend" or "lover" without stigmatization.

A 2023 Williams Institute analysis using 2020–2021 CDC data estimated that 5.1% of Hawaiʻi adults—approximately 56,900 people—identify as LGBT. Same-sex couple households have increased substantially since 2010: the 2023 American Community Survey estimated 5,918 same-sex couple households in Hawaiʻi, compared with 3,239 in 2010. Of the 2023 households, 3,663 (61.9%) were married same-sex couples, reflecting the nationwide expansion of marriage equality following the 2015 Obergefell v. Hodges decision. In 2013, Hawaii became the fifteenth U.S. state to legalize same-sex marriage; this reportedly boosted tourism by $217 million.

=== Vital statistics ===
Year	Population	Live births	Deaths	Natural change	Crude birth rate (per 1,000)	Crude death rate (per 1,000)	Natural change (per 1,000)	Crude migration change (per 1,000)
2000	1,213,519	17,551	8,290	9,261	14.5	6.8	7.7	
2001	1,225,948	17,072	8,394	8,678	13.9	6.8	7.1	3.1
2002	1,239,613	17,477	8,801	8,676	14.1	7.1	7.0	4.0
2003	1,251,154	18,100	8,978	9,122	14.5	7.2	7.3	1.9
2004	1,273,569	18,281	9,030	9,251	14.4	7.1	7.3	10.3
2005	1,292,729	17,924	9,136	8,788	13.9	7.1	6.8	8.0
2006	1,309,731	18,982	9,432	9,550	14.5	7.2	7.3	5.7
2007	1,315,675	19,134	9,495	9,639	14.5	7.2	7.3	-2.8
2008	1,332,213	19,484	9,501	9,983	14.6	7.1	7.5	4.9
2009	1,346,717	18,887	9,914	8,973	14.0	7.4	6.6	4.1
2010	1,365,117	18,988	9,617	9,371	13.9	7.0	6.9	6.6
2011	1,385,141	18,956	9,923	9,033	13.7	7.2	6.5	7.9
2012	1,405,255	18,980	10,274	8,706	13.5	7.3	6.2	8.1
2013	1,423,345	18,987	10,505	8,482	13.3	7.4	5.9	6.8
2014	1,434,323	18,550	10,767	7,783	12.9	7.5	5.4	2.2
2015	1,446,452	18,420	11,053	7,367	12.7	7.6	5.1	3.3
2016	1,456,816	18,059	10,913	7,146	12.4	7.5	4.9	2.2
2017	1,458,161	17,517	11,390	6,127	12.0	7.8	4.2	-3.3
2018	1,459,965	16,972	11,415	5,557	11.6	7.8	3.8	-2.6
2019	1,456,943	16,797	11,559	5,238	11.5	7.9	3.6	-5.7
2020	1,451,130	15,785	12,033	3,752	10.9	8.3	2.6	-6.6
2021	1,446,909	15,620	12,854	2,766	10.8	8.9	1.9	-4.8
2022	1,437,812	15,535	13,264	2,271	10.8	9.2	1.6	-7.9
2023	1,434,950	14,808	12,670	2,138	10.3	8.8	1.5	-3.5
2024	1,434,952	14,917	12,818	2,099	10.4	8.9	1.5	-1.5
2025	1,432,820	14,442	12,705	1,737	10.1	8.9	1.2	-2.7

== Economy ==
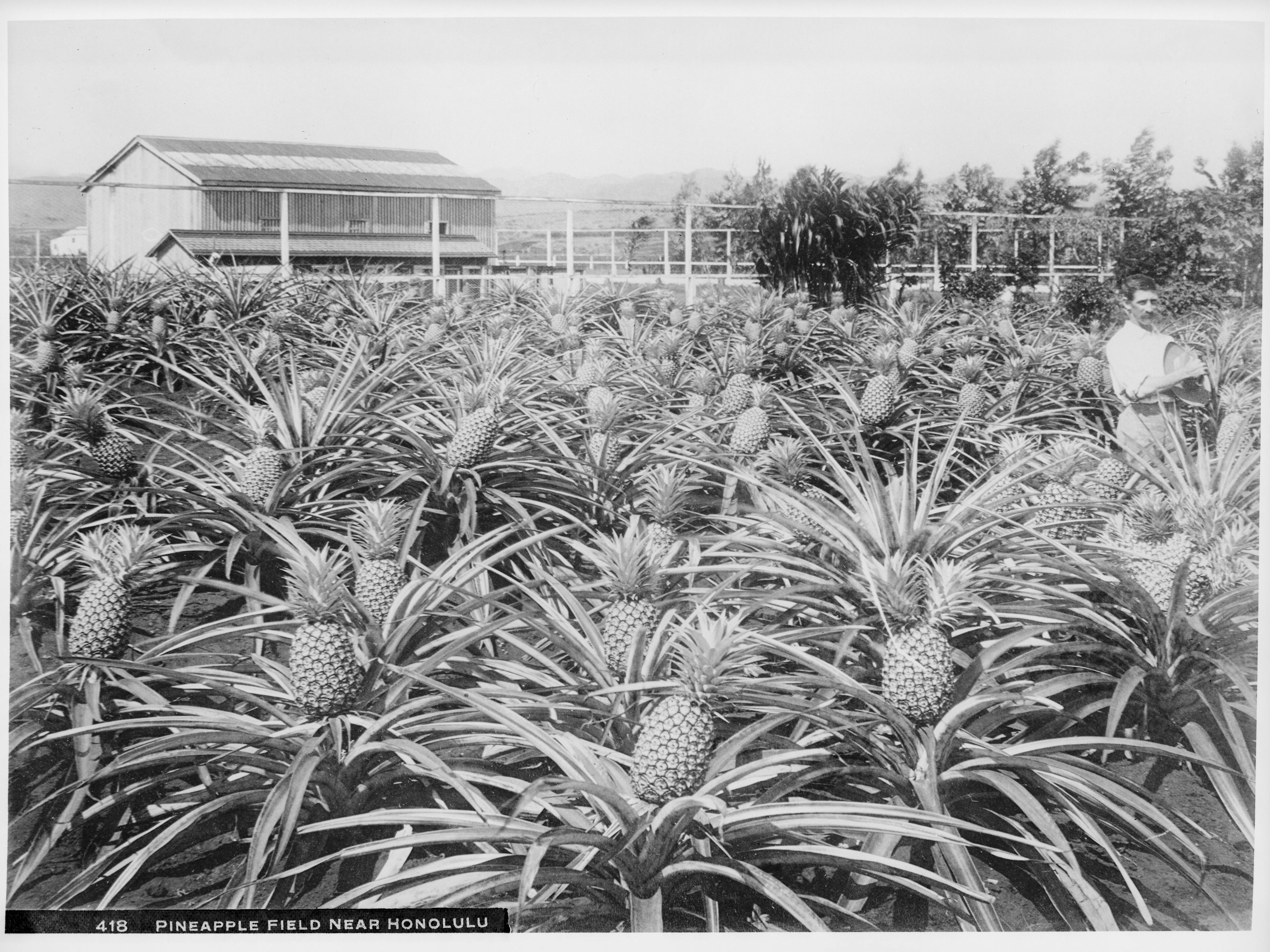
Post-annexation, Hawaii's economy and demographic changes were shaped mostly by growth in the agricultural sector.

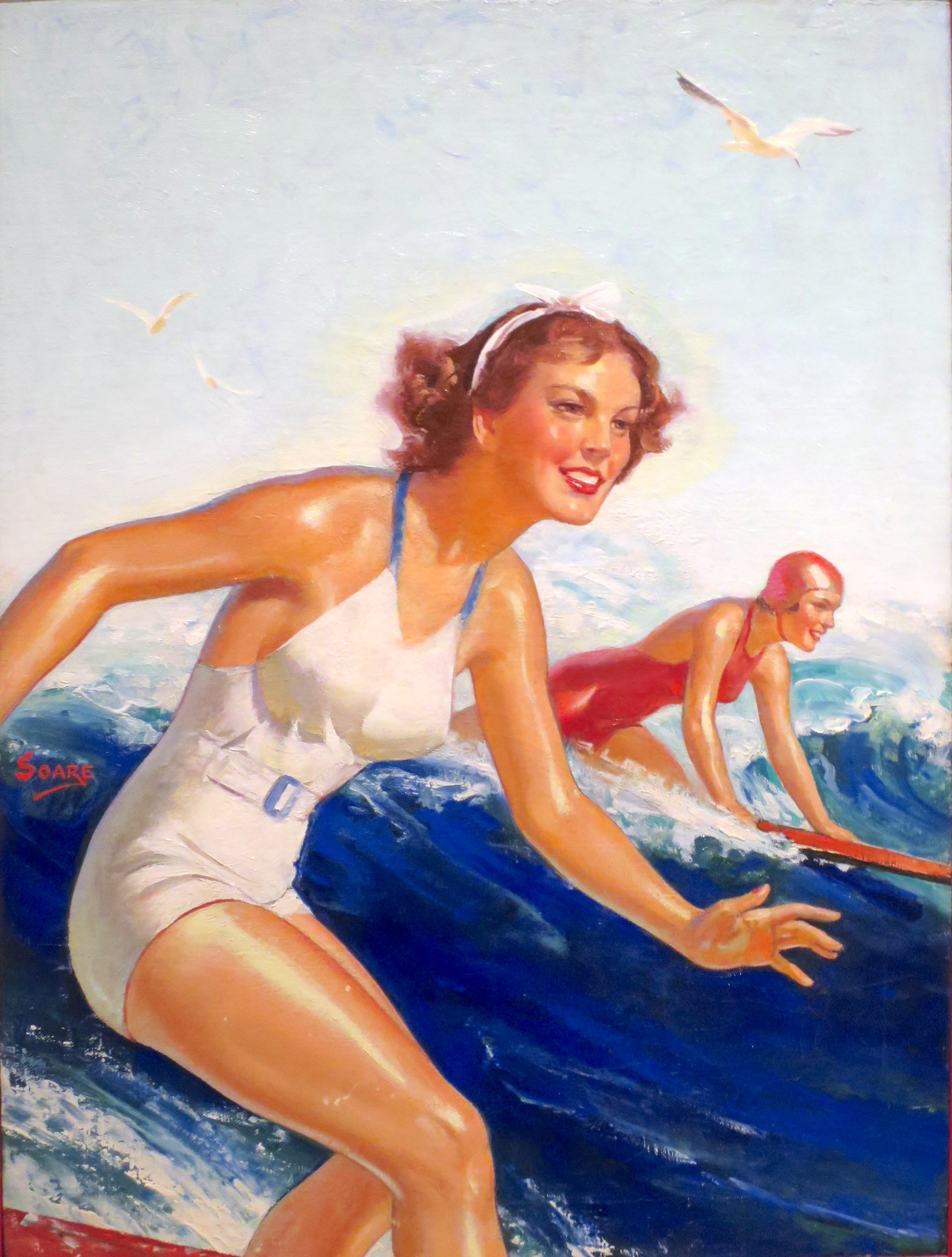
From the end of World War II onwards, depictions and photographs, such as this one of Hawaii as a tropical, leisure paradise, encouraged the growth of tourism in Hawaii, which eventually became the largest industry of the islands.

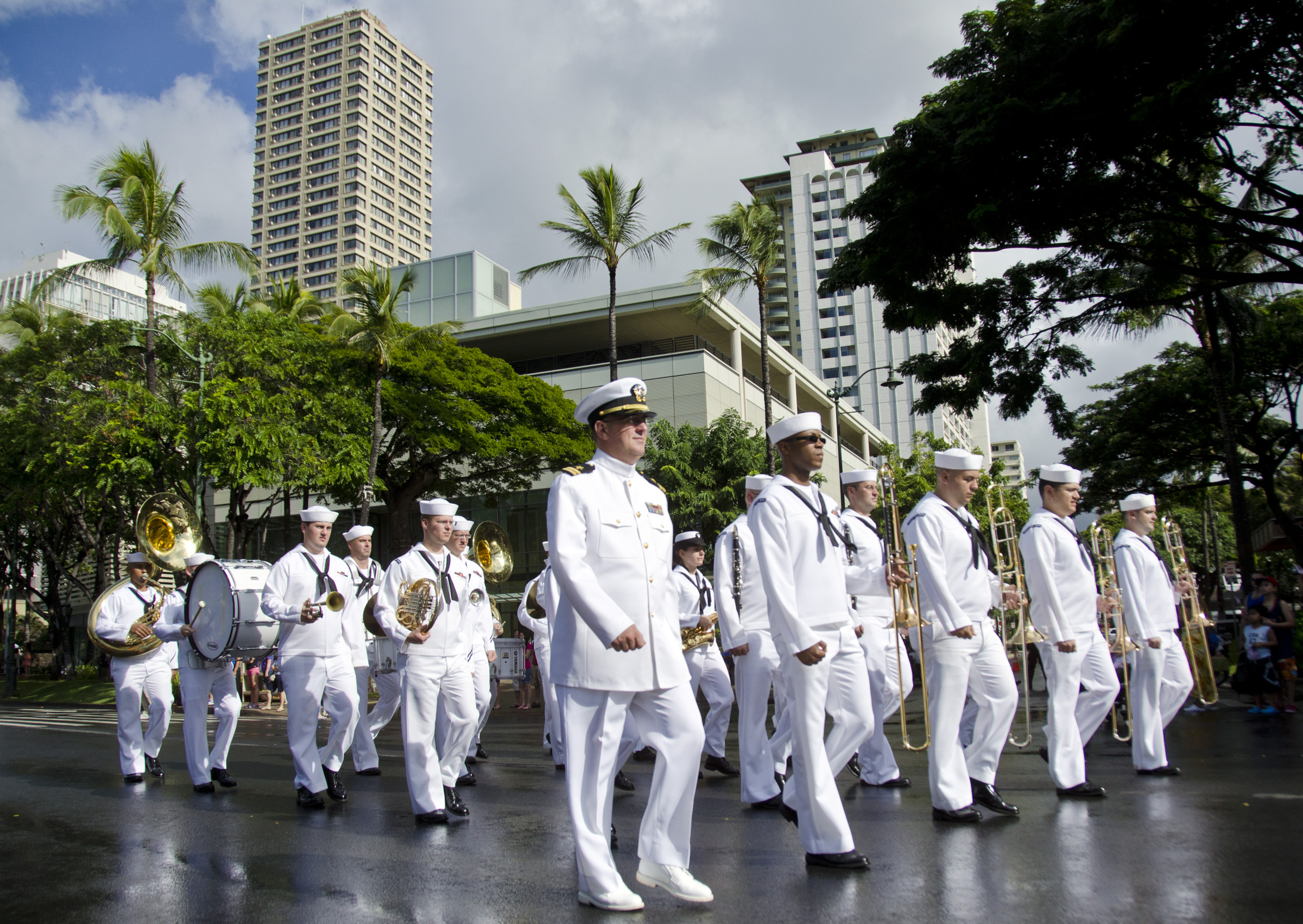
The U.S. federal government's spending on Hawaii-stationed personnel, installations, and materiel (either directly or through military personnel spending) amounts to Hawaii's second largest source of income after tourism.

The history of Hawaii's economy can be traced through a succession of dominant industries: sandalwood, whaling, sugarcane, pineapple, the military, tourism and education. By the 1840s, sugar plantations had gained a strong foothold in the Hawaiian economy, due to a high demand of sugar in the United States and rapid transport via steamships. Sugarcane plantations were tightly controlled by American missionary families and businessmen known as "the Big Five", who monopolized control of the sugar industry's profits. By the time Hawaiian annexation was being considered in 1898, sugarcane producers turned to cultivating tropical fruits like pineapple, which became the principal export for Hawaii's plantation economy.

Since statehood in 1959, tourism has been the largest industry, contributing 24.3% of the gross state product (GSP) in 1997, despite efforts to diversify. In 2025, Hawaii's gross state product was $124.6 billion and the per capita personal income for Hawaii residents was $76,592. Hawaiian exports include food and clothing. These industries play a small role in the Hawaiian economy, due to the shipping distance to viable markets, such as the West Coast of the United States. The state's food exports include coffee, macadamia nuts, pineapple, livestock, sugarcane, and honey.

By weight, honey bees may be the state's most valuable export in 2012. According to the Hawaii Agricultural Statistics Service, in 2002 agricultural sales were US$370.9 million from diversified agriculture, US$100.6 million from pineapple, and US$64.3 million from sugarcane. Hawaii's relatively consistent climate has attracted the seed industry, which is able to test three generations of crops per year on the islands, compared with one or two on the mainland. Seeds yielded US$264 million in 2012, supporting 1,400 workers.

As of August 2025, the state's unemployment rate was 2.7%. The historically lowest unemployment rate of 2.0% was recorded in December 2017, and its highest, 22.0%, in April 2020. In 2025, 99.3% of Hawaii's businesses were small businesses, employing 49.6% of the state's workforce.

In 2023, approximately $10.2 billion in defense spending flowed into Hawaiʻi, equivalent to about 9.2% of the state's GDP. The military presence included approximately 73,000 personnel, of whom 43,118 were active-duty service members. According to a 2013 study by Phoenix Marketing International, Hawaii at that time had the fourth-largest number of millionaires per capita in the United States, with a ratio of 7.2%.

=== Taxation ===
Tax is collected by the Hawaii Department of Taxation. Most government revenue comes from personal income taxes and a general excise tax (GET) levied primarily on businesses; there is no statewide tax on sales, personal property, or stock transfers, while the effective property tax rate is among the lowest in the country. The high rate of tourism means that millions of visitors generate public revenue through GET and the hotel room tax. However, Hawaii residents generally pay among the most state taxes per person in the U.S.

The Tax Foundation of Hawaii considers the state's tax burden too high, claiming that it contributes to higher prices and the perception of an unfriendly business climate. The nonprofit Tax Foundation ranks Hawaii third in income tax burden and second in its overall tax burden, though notes that a significant portion of taxes are borne by tourists. Former State Senator Sam Slom attributed Hawaii's comparatively high tax rate to the fact that the state government is responsible for education, health care, and social services that are usually handled at a county or municipal level in most other states.

=== Cost of living ===
The cost of living in Hawaii, specifically Honolulu, is high compared to that of most major U.S. cities, although it is 6.7% lower than in New York City and 3.6% lower than in San Francisco. These numbers may not take into account some costs, such as increased travel costs for flights, additional shipping fees, and the loss of promotional participation opportunities for customers outside the contiguous U.S. While some online stores offer free shipping on orders to Hawaii, many merchants exclude Hawaii, Alaska, Puerto Rico and certain other U.S. territories.

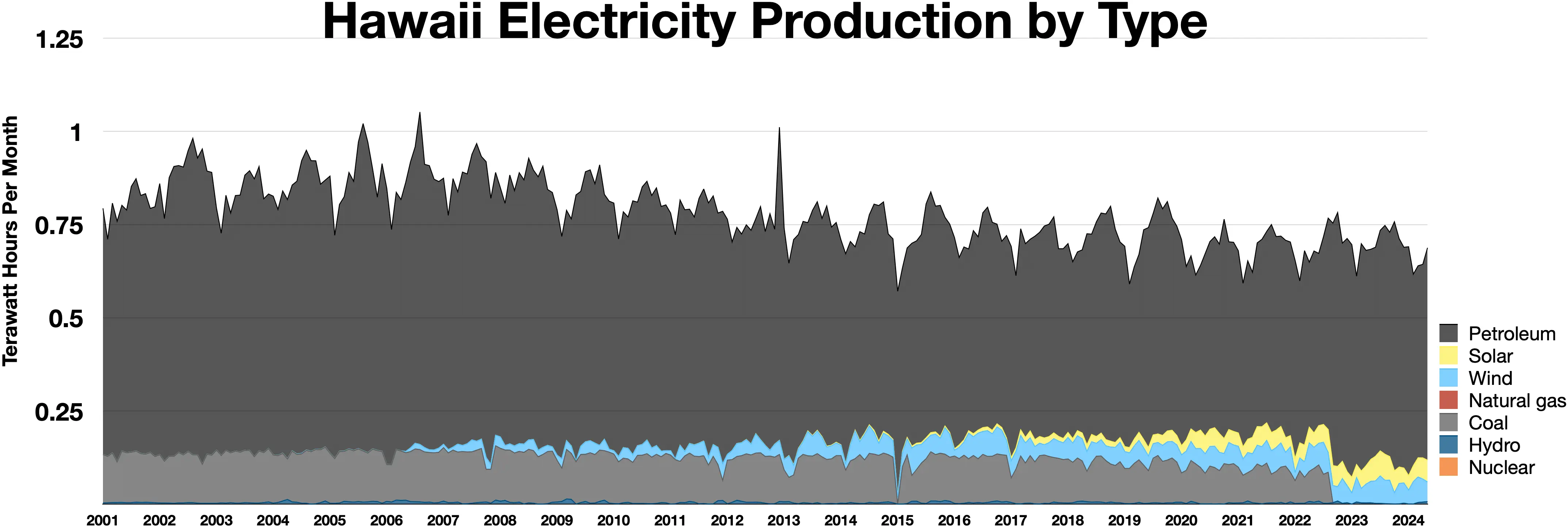
Hawaii electricity production by type

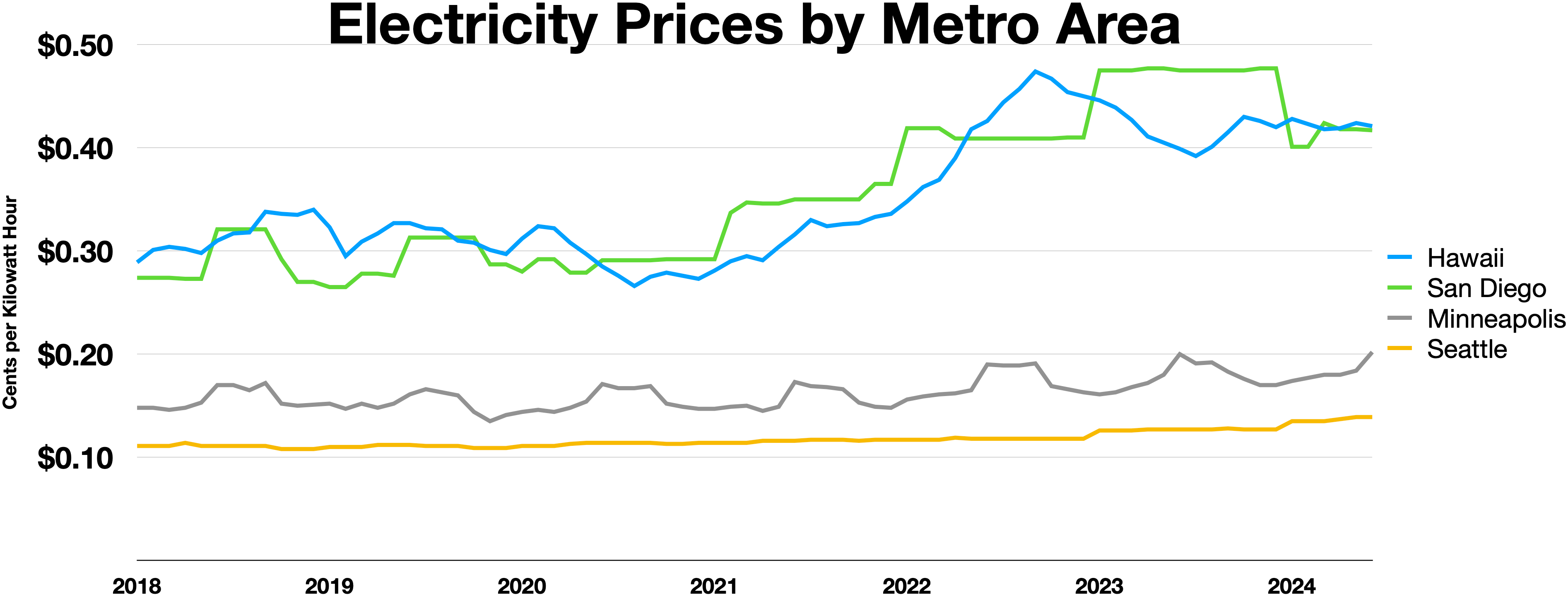
Electricity prices by metro area

Hawaiian Electric Industries, a privately owned company, provides 95% of the state's population with electricity. Although the state's electricity system remains heavily dependent on imported petroleum, renewable sources accounted for 36.8% of Hawaiian Electric's generation in 2025, up from 36% in 2024. Hawaii also continues to have the highest electricity prices in the United States: in 2024, the average retail price across all sectors was 38.00 cents per kilowatt-hour, compared with 12.94 cents nationally. Preliminary data for the first quarter of 2026 put Hawaii's average at 37.15 cents per kilowatt-hour, compared with 14.23 cents nationally.

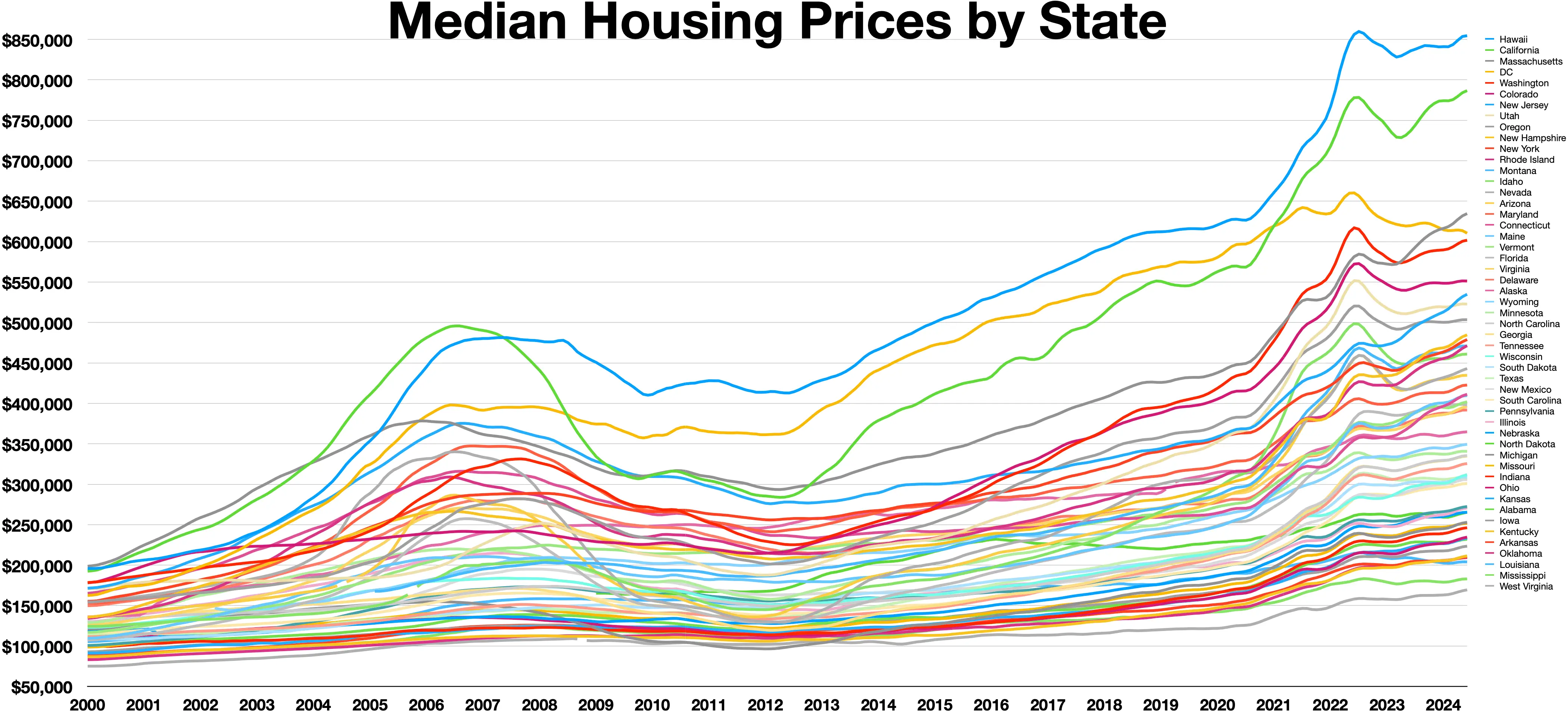
Median housing prices by State

The median home value in Hawaii in the 2000 U.S. Census was US$272,700, while the national median home value was US$119,600. Hawaii home values were the highest of all states, including California with a median home value of US$211,500. Research from the National Association of Realtors places the 2010 median sale price of a single family home in Honolulu, Hawaii, at US$607,600 and the U.S. median sales price at US$173,200. The sale price of single family homes in Hawaii was the highest of any U.S. city in 2010, just above that of the Silicon Valley area of California (US$602,000).

Hawaii's very high cost of living is the result of several interwoven factors of the global economy in addition to domestic U.S. government trade policy. Like other regions with desirable weather year-round, such as California, Arizona and Florida, Hawaii's residents can be considered to be subject to a "sunshine tax". This situation is further exacerbated by the natural factors of geography and world distribution that lead to higher prices for goods due to increased shipping costs, a problem which many island states and territories suffer from as well.

The higher costs to ship goods across an ocean may be further increased by the requirements of the Jones Act, which generally requires that goods be transported between places within the U.S., including between the mainland U.S. west coast and Hawaii, using only U.S.-owned, built, and crewed ships. Jones Act-compliant vessels are often more expensive to build and operate than foreign equivalents, which can drive up shipping costs. While the Jones Act does not affect transportation of goods to Hawaii directly from Asia, this type of trade is nonetheless not common; this is a result of other primarily economic reasons including additional costs associated with stopping over in Hawaii (e.g. pilot and port fees), the market size of Hawaii, and the economics of using ever-larger ships that cannot be handled in Hawaii for transoceanic voyages. Therefore, Hawaii relies on receiving most inbound goods on Jones Act-qualified vessels originating from the U.S. west coast, which may contribute to the increased cost of some consumer goods and therefore the overall cost of living. Critics of the Jones Act contend that Hawaii consumers ultimately bear the expense of transporting goods imposed by the Jones Act.

== Culture ==
The aboriginal culture of Hawaii is Polynesian. Hawaii represents the northernmost extension of the vast Polynesian Triangle of the south and central Pacific Ocean. While traditional Hawaiian culture remains as vestiges in modern Hawaiian society, there are re-enactments of the ceremonies and traditions throughout the islands. Some of these cultural influences, including the popularity (in greatly modified form) of lūʻau and hula, and gestures such as the Shaka sign, are strong enough to affect the wider United States.

=== Cuisine ===
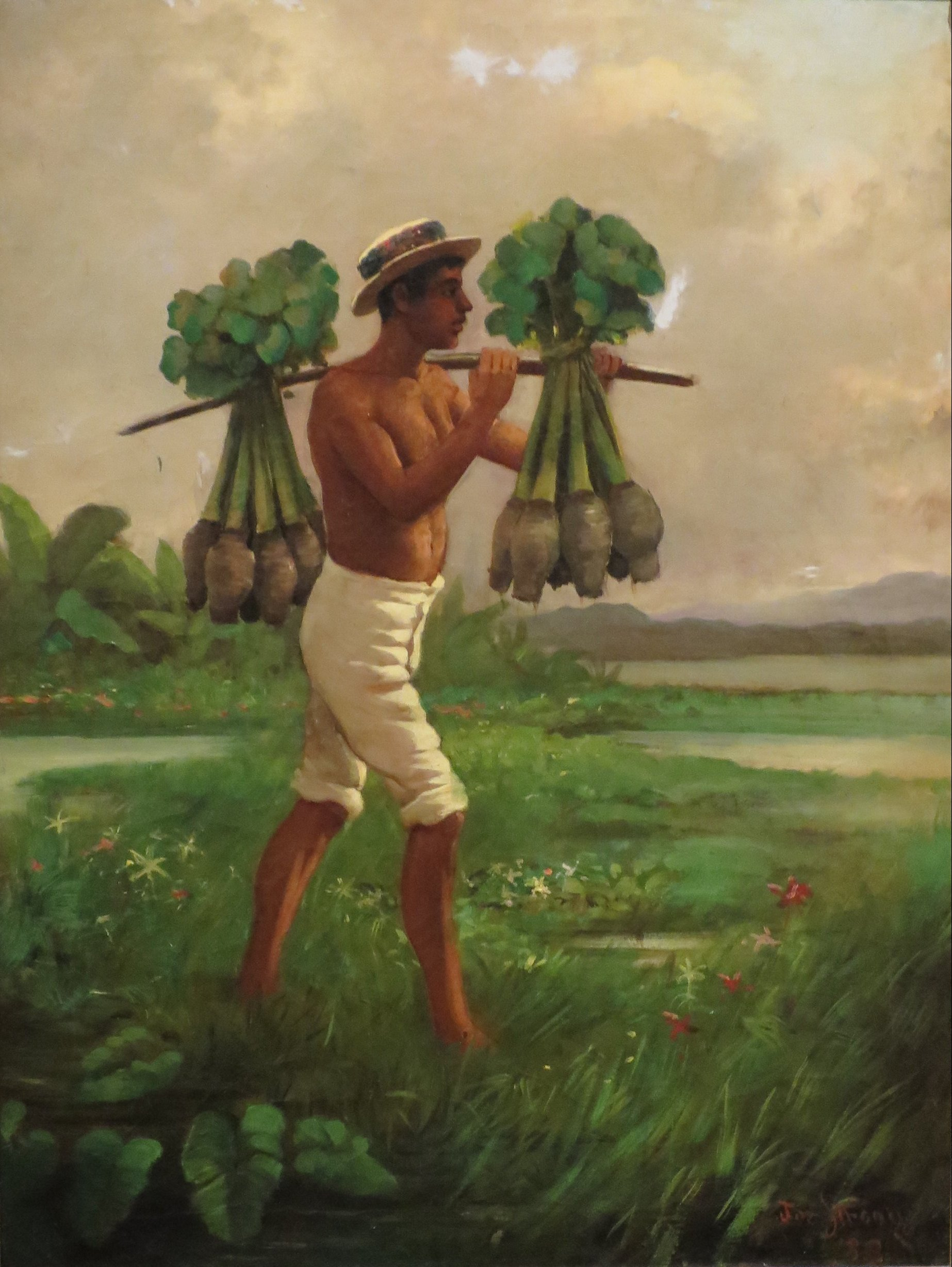
Taro, or in Hawaiian kalo, was one of the primary staples in Ancient Hawaii and remains a central ingredient in Hawaiian gastronomy today.

The cuisine of Hawaii is a fusion of many foods brought by immigrants to the Hawaiian Islands, including the earliest Polynesians and Native Hawaiian cuisine, and American, Chinese, Filipino, Japanese, Korean, Polynesian, Puerto Rican, and Portuguese origins. Plant and animal food sources are imported from around the world for agricultural use in Hawaii. Poi, a starch made by pounding taro, is one of the traditional foods of the islands. Many local restaurants serve the ubiquitous plate lunch, which features two scoops of rice, a simplified version of American macaroni salad and a variety of toppings including hamburger patties, a fried egg, and gravy of a loco moco, Japanese style tonkatsu or the traditional lūʻau favorites, including kālua pork and laulau. Spam musubi is an example of the fusion of ethnic cuisine that developed on the islands among the mix of immigrant groups and military personnel. In the 1990s, a group of chefs developed Hawaii regional cuisine as a contemporary fusion cuisine.

=== Customs and etiquette ===
Some key customs and etiquette in Hawaii are as follows: when visiting a home, it is considered good manners to bring a small gift for one's host (for example, a dessert). Thus, parties are usually in the form of potlucks. Most locals take their shoes off before entering a home. It is customary for Hawaiian families, regardless of ethnicity, to hold a luau to celebrate a child's first birthday. It is also customary at Hawaiian weddings, especially at Filipino weddings, for the bride and groom to do a money dance (also called the pandanggo). Print media and local residents recommend that one refer to residents of Hawaii who are not ethnically Hawaiian as "locals of Hawaii" or "people of Hawaii".

=== Hawaiian mythology ===
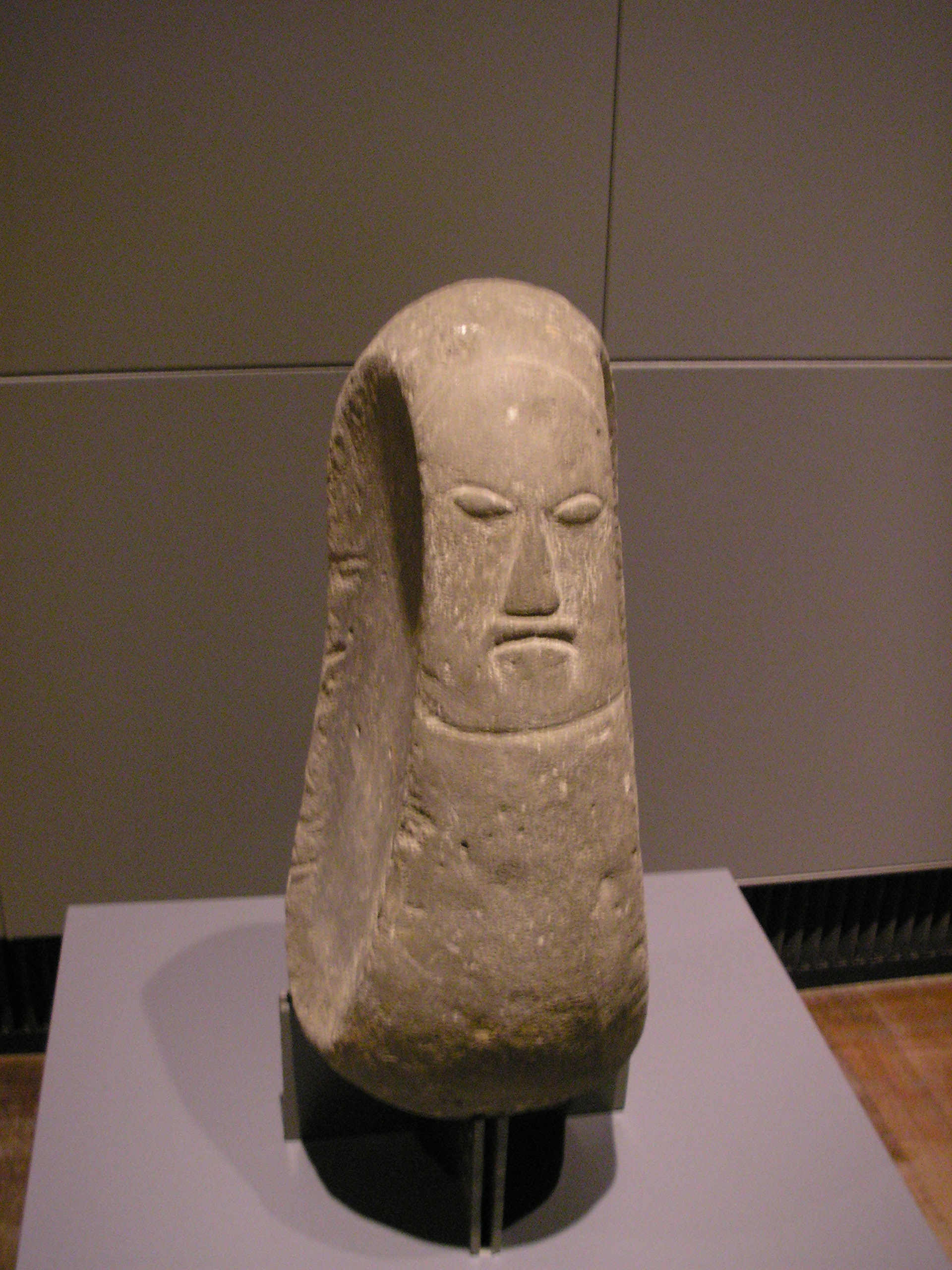
A stone carving of a Hawaiian deity, housed at a German museum

Hawaiian mythology includes the legends, historical tales, and sayings of the ancient Hawaiian people. It is considered a variant of a more general Polynesian mythology that developed a unique character for several centuries before c. 1800. It is associated with the Hawaiian religion, which was officially suppressed in the 19th century but was kept alive by some practitioners to the modern day. Prominent figures and terms include Aumakua, the spirit of an ancestor or family god and Kāne, the highest of the four major Hawaiian deities.

=== Polynesian mythology ===
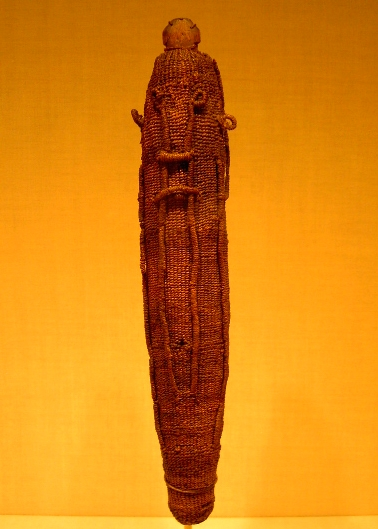
A sacred god figure wrapping for the war god ʻOro, made of woven dried coconut fibre (sennit), made to protect a Polynesian god effigy (toʻo), carved from wood

Polynesian mythology is the oral traditions of the people of Polynesia, a grouping of Central and South Pacific Ocean island archipelagos in the Polynesian triangle together with the scattered cultures known as the Polynesian outliers. Polynesians speak languages that descend from a language reconstructed as Proto-Polynesian that was probably spoken in the area around Tonga and Samoa in around 1000 BC.

Prior to the 15th century, Polynesian people migrated east to the Cook Islands, and from there to other island groups such as Tahiti and the Marquesas. Their descendants later discovered the islands Tahiti, Rapa Nui, and later the Hawaiian Islands and New Zealand.

The Polynesian languages are part of the Austronesian language family. Many are close enough in terms of vocabulary and grammar to be mutually intelligible. There are also substantial cultural similarities between the various groups, especially in terms of social organization, childrearing, horticulture, building and textile technologies. Their mythologies in particular demonstrate local reworkings of commonly shared tales. The Polynesian cultures each have distinct but related oral traditions; legends or myths are traditionally considered to recount ancient history (the time of "pō") and the adventures of gods ("atua") and deified ancestors.

=== List of state parks ===
There are many Hawaiian state parks.

- The Island of Hawaiʻi has state parks, recreation areas, and historical parks.
- Kauaʻi has the Ahukini State Recreation Pier, six state parks, and the Russian Fort Elizabeth State Historical Park.
- Maui has two state monuments, several state parks, and the Polipoli Spring State Recreation Area. Molokaʻi has the Palaʻau State Park.
- Oʻahu has several state parks, a number of state recreation areas, and a number of monuments, including the Ulu Pō Heiau State Monument.

=== Literature ===
The literature of Hawaii is diverse and includes authors Kiana Davenport, Lois-Ann Yamanaka, and Kaui Hart Hemmings. Hawaiian magazines include Hana Hou!, Hawaii Business and Honolulu, among others.

=== Music ===
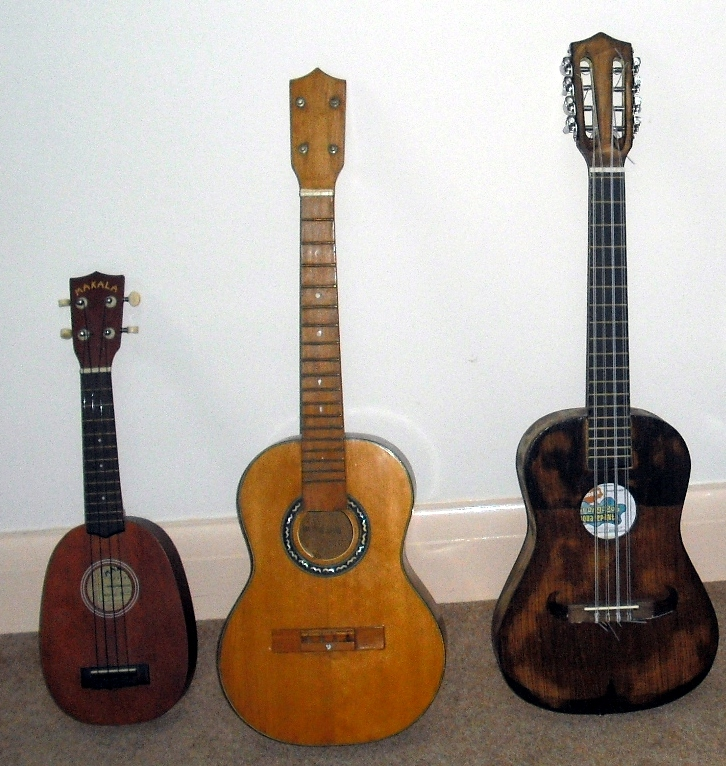
Different types of ukuleles, widely used in Hawaiian music

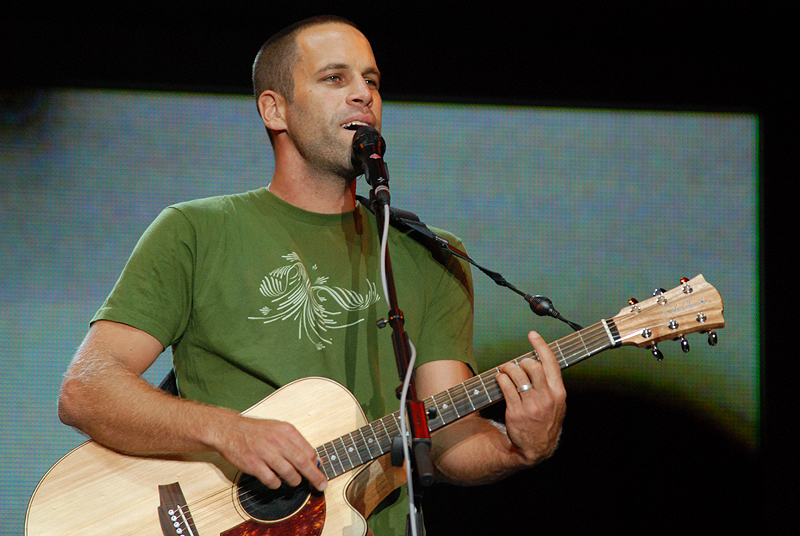
Jack Johnson, a folk rock musician, was born and raised on Oʻahu's North Shore.

The music of Hawaii includes traditional and popular styles, ranging from native Hawaiian folk music to modern rock and hip-hop.

Styles such as slack-key guitar are well known worldwide, while Hawaiian-tinged music is a frequent part of Hollywood soundtracks. Hawaii also made a major contribution to country music with the introduction of the steel guitar.

Traditional Hawaiian folk music is a major part of the state's musical heritage. The Hawaiian people have inhabited the islands for centuries and have retained much of their traditional musical knowledge. Their music is largely religious in nature, and includes chanting and dance music.

Hawaiian music has had an enormous impact on the music of other Polynesian islands; according to Peter Manuel, the influence of Hawaiian music is a "unifying factor in the development of modern Pacific musics". Native Hawaiian musician and Hawaiian sovereignty activist Israel Kamakawiwoʻole, famous for his medley of "Somewhere Over the Rainbow/What a Wonderful World", was named "The Voice of Hawaii" by NPR in 2010 in its 50 great voices series.

=== Sports ===
Due to its distance from the continental United States, team sports in Hawaii are characterised by youth, collegial and amateur teams over professional teams, although some professional teams sports teams have at one time played in the state. Notable professional teams include The Hawaiians, which played at the World Football League in 1974 and 1975; the Hawaii Islanders, a Triple-A minor league baseball team that played at the Pacific Coast League from 1961 to 1987; and Team Hawaii, a North American Soccer League team that played in 1977.

Notable college sports events in Hawaii include the Maui Invitational Tournament, Diamond Head Classic (basketball) and Hawaii Bowl (football). The only NCAA Division I team in Hawaii is the Hawaii Rainbow Warriors and Rainbow Wahine, which competes at the Big West Conference (major sports), Mountain West Conference (football) and Mountain Pacific Sports Federation (minor sports). There are three teams in NCAA Division II: Chaminade Silverswords, Hawaii Pacific Sharks and Hawaii-Hilo Vulcans, all of which compete at the Pacific West Conference.

Surfing at North Shore of Oʻahu

Surfing has been a central part of Polynesian culture for centuries. Since the late 19th century, Hawaii has become a major site for surfists from around the world. Notable competitions include the Triple Crown of Surfing and The Eddie. Likewise, Hawaii has produced elite-level swimmers, including five-time Olympic medalist Duke Kahanamoku and Buster Crabbe, who set 16 swimming world records.

Hawaii has hosted the Sony Championship Hawaii golf tournament since 1965, the Lotte Championship golf tournament since 2012, the Tournament of Champions golf tournament from 1999 to 2025, the Honolulu Marathon since 1973, the Ironman World Championship triathlon race since 1978, the Ultraman triathlon since 1983, the National Football League's Pro Bowl from 1980 to 2016, the 2000 FINA World Open Water Swimming Championships, and the 2008 Pan-Pacific Championship and 2012 Hawaiian Islands Invitational soccer tournaments.

Hawaii has produced a number of notable Mixed Martial Arts fighters, such as former UFC Lightweight Champion and UFC Welterweight Champion B.J. Penn, and former UFC Featherweight Champion Max Holloway. Other notable Hawaiian Martial Artists include Travis Browne, K. J. Noons, Brad Tavares and Wesley Correira.

Hawaiians have found success in the world of sumo wrestling. Takamiyama Daigorō was the first foreigner to ever win a sumo title in Japan, while his protege Akebono Tarō became a top-level sumo wrestler in Japan during the 1990s before transitioning into a successful professional wrestling career in the 2000s. Akebono was the first foreign-born Sumo to reach Yokozuna in history and helped fuel a boom in interest in Sumo during his career.

== Tourism ==
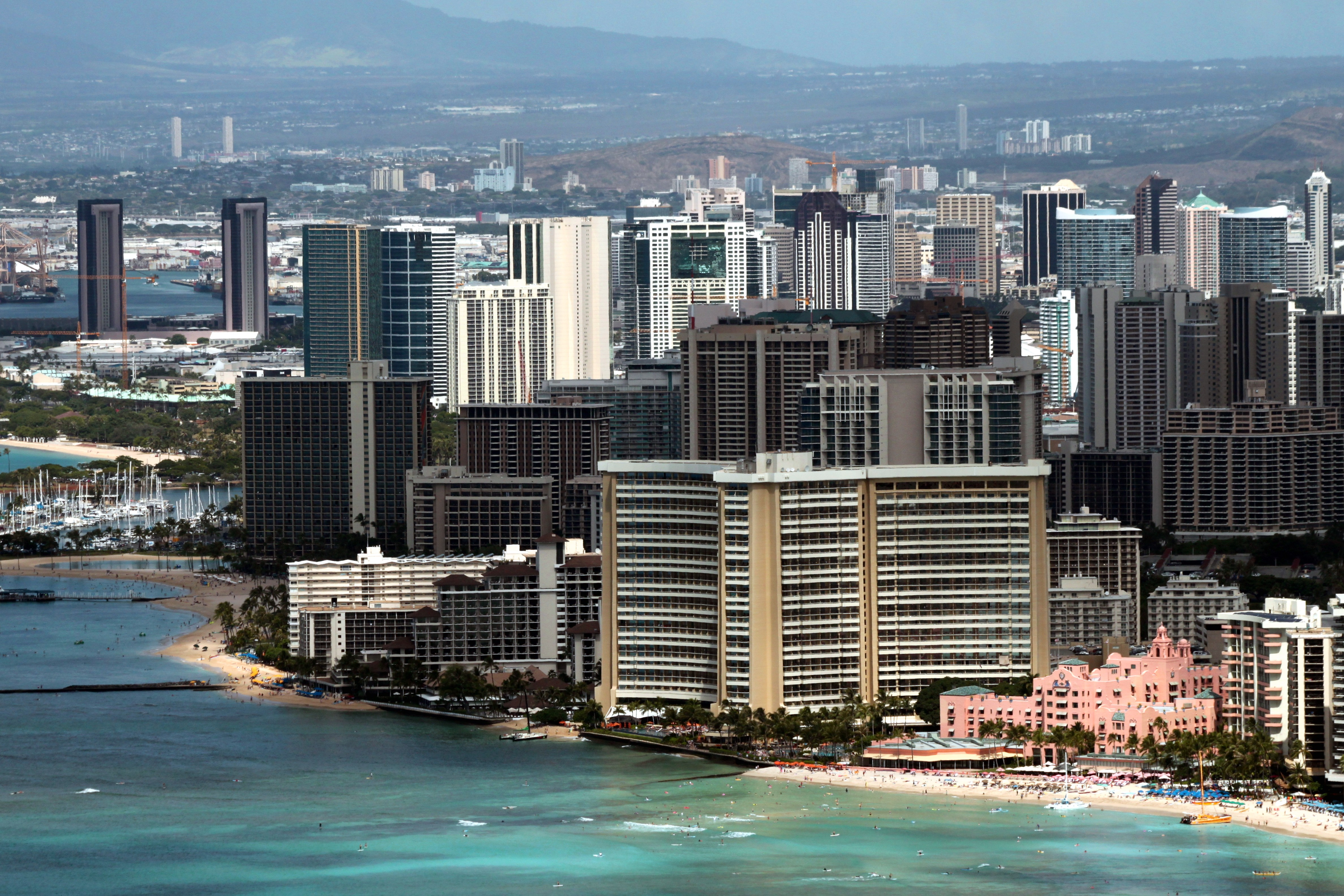
Tourism is Hawaii's leading employment sector, providing numerous jobs in places such as Waikīkī in Honolulu (above).

Punaluʻu Beach, on the Big Island features black volcanic sand.

Tourism is an important part of the Hawaiian economy as it represents a quarter of the economy. According to the Hawaii Department of Business, Economic Development & Tourism (DBEDT) and the Hawaii Tourism Authority, a total of 9,642,991 visitors arrived in 2025 which decreased 0.6% from the previous year. However, visitor spending reached a record approximately $21.75 billion in 2025, an increase of 5.7% from 2024. Due to mild year-round weather, tourist travel is popular throughout the year. Tourism supported approximately 222,000 jobs statewide and generated about $3.04 billion in state tax revenue. The U.S. West was Hawaii's largest visitor market, accounting for 5.01 million arrivals, followed by the U.S. East with 2.41 million. Japan accounted for approximately 732,000 visitors, while Canada accounted for approximately 394,000.

It was with statehood in 1959 that the Hawaii tourism industry began to grow.

According to Hawaiian scholar Haunani-Kay Trask, tourism in Hawaii has led to the commodification and exploitation of Hawaiian culture resulting in insidious forms of "cultural prostitution". Hawaii has been used to fuel ideas of escapism yet tourism in Hawaii ignores the harm Kanaka and locals experience. Cultural traditions such as the hula have been made "ornamental ... a form of exotica" for tourists as a way for large corporations and land owners to gain profit over the exploitation of Hawaiian people and culture.

Tourism in Hawaii has been considered as an escape from reality resulting in the dismissal of violence faced by Native Hawaiians and locals living on the land. According to scholar Winona LaDuke, native Hawaiians have been forced to gather "shrimp and fish from ponds sitting on resort property". Tourism has also had damaging effects on the environment such as water shortages, overcrowding, sea level rising, elevated sea surface temperatures and micro plastics on beaches.

Due to the COVID-19 pandemic, tourism in Hawaii came to a halt, which allowed the land, water, and animals to began to heal. Fish such as the baby akule and big ulua returned after years of not being around the bay. The coral reefs, fish, water growth, and limu (algae) growth was able to flourish without the impact of tourism.

There has been pushback against tourism by Native Hawaiians, urging people not to visit the islands. A survey by the Hawaii Tourism Authority indicated over two-thirds of Hawaiians did not want tourists to return to Hawaii. Tourism had "become extractive and hurtful, with tourists coming here and taking, taking, taking, taking, without any reciprocation with locals".

Hawaii hosts numerous cultural events. The annual Merrie Monarch Festival is an international Hula competition. The Hawaii International Film Festival is the premier film festival for Pacific rim cinema. Honolulu hosts the state's long-running LGBT film festival, the Honolulu Rainbow Film Festival.

== Health ==
As of 2009, Hawaii's health care system insures 92% of residents. Under the state's plan, businesses are required to provide insurance to employees who work more than twenty hours per week. Heavy regulation of insurance companies helps reduce the cost to employers. Due in part to heavy emphasis on preventive care, Hawaiians' total health care expenses measured as a percentage of state GDP are substantially lower. Proponents of universal health care elsewhere in the U.S. sometimes use Hawaii as a model for proposed federal and state health care plans.

== Education ==
=== Public schools ===
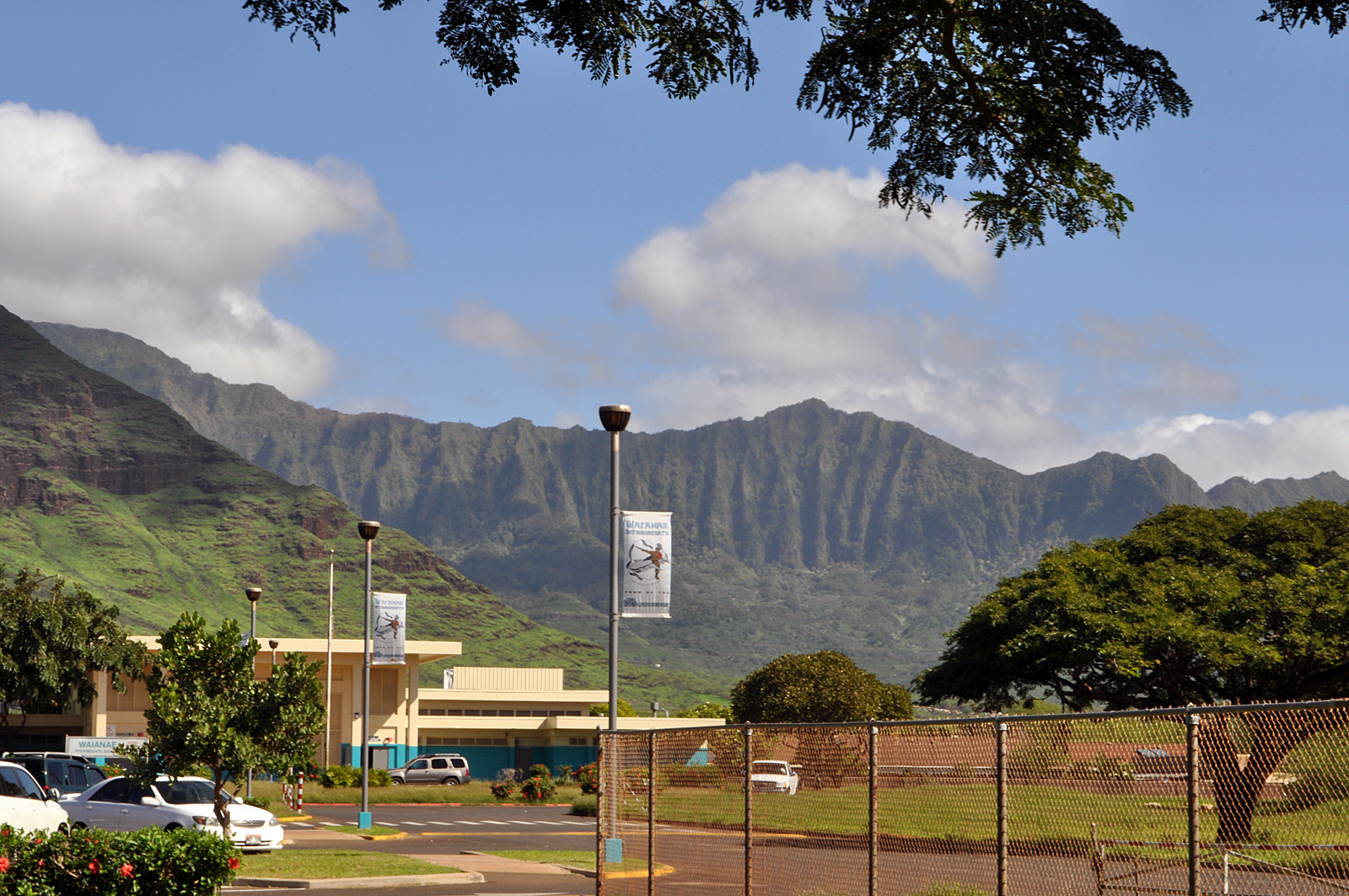
Waianae High School, located in Waiʻanae, houses an educational community media center

Hawaii has the only school system within the U.S. that is unified statewide. Policy decisions are made by the fourteen-member state Board of Education, which sets policy and hires the superintendent of schools, who oversees the Hawaii Department of Education. The Department of Education is divided into seven districts; four on Oʻahu and one for each of the other three counties.

Public elementary, middle and high school test scores in Hawaii are below national averages on tests mandated under the No Child Left Behind Act. The Hawaii Board of Education requires all eligible students to take these tests and report all student test scores. This may have unbalanced the results that reported in August 2005 that of 282 schools across the state, 185 failed to reach federal minimum performance standards in mathematics and reading. The ACT college placement tests show that in 2005, seniors scored slightly above the national average (21.9 compared with 20.9), but in the widely accepted SAT examinations, Hawaii's college-bound seniors tend to score below the national average in all categories except mathematics.

The first native controlled public charter school was the Kanu O Ka Aina New Century Charter School.

=== Private schools ===
Hawaii has the highest rates of private school attendance in the nation. During the 2011–2012 school year, Hawaii public and charter schools had an enrollment of 181,213, while private schools had 37,695. Private schools educated over 17% of students in Hawaii that school year, nearly three times the approximate national average of 6%. According to Alia Wong of Honolulu Civil Beat, this is due to private schools being relatively inexpensive compared to ones on the mainland as well as the overall reputations of private schools.

It has four of the largest independent schools; ʻIolani School, Kamehameha Schools, Mid-Pacific Institute and Punahou School. Pacific Buddhist Academy, the second Buddhist high school in the U.S. and first such school in Hawaii, was founded in 2003.

Independent schools can select their students, while most public schools of HIDOE are open to all students in their attendance zones. The Kamehameha Schools are the only schools in the U.S. that openly grant admission to students based on ancestry; collectively, they are one of the wealthiest schools in the United States, if not the world, having over eleven billion US dollars in estate assets. In 2005, Kamehameha enrolled 5,398 students, 8.4% of the Native Hawaiian children in the state.

=== Colleges and universities ===
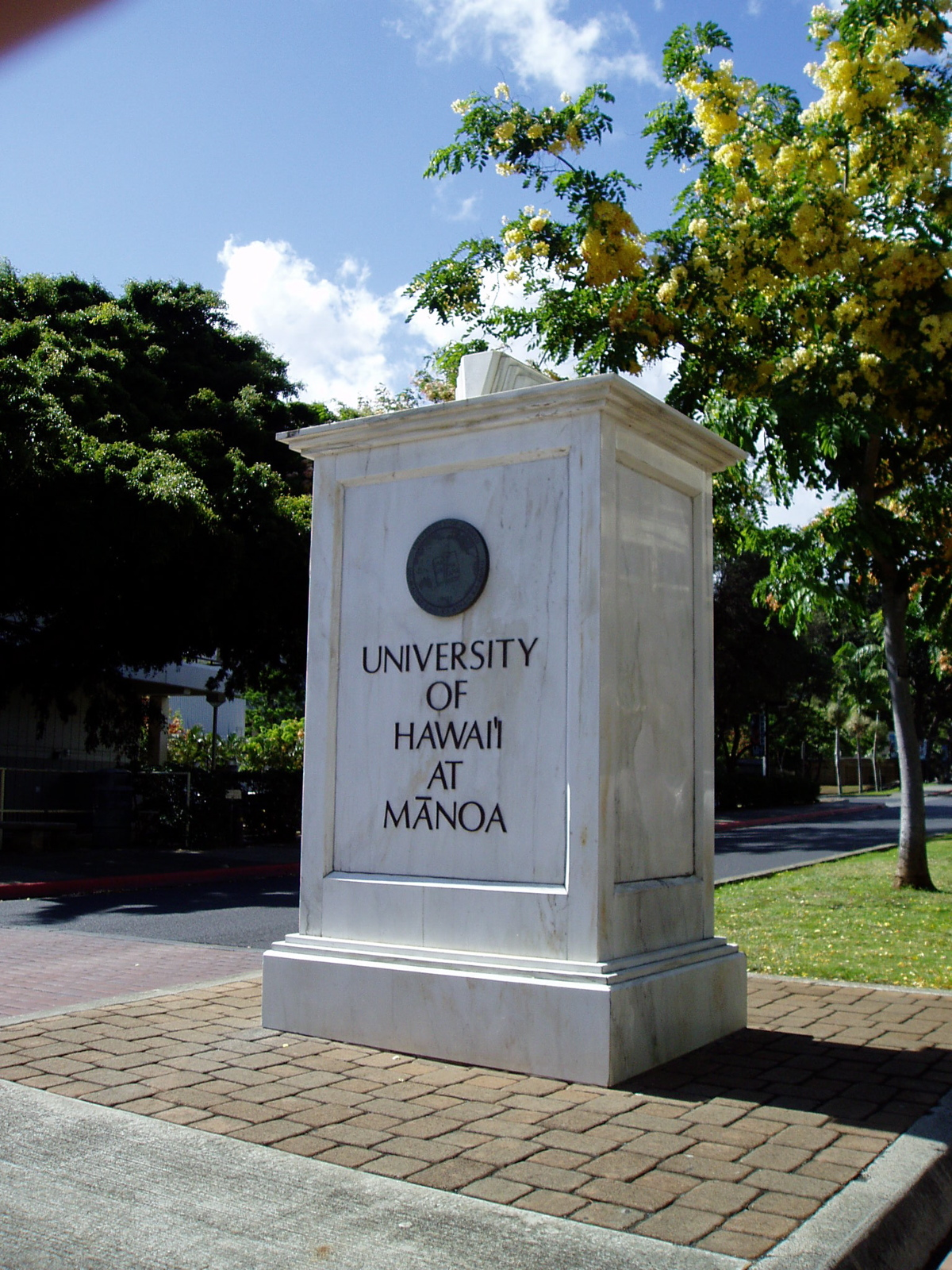
Main entrance of the University of Hawaiʻi at Mānoa

The largest institution of higher learning in Hawaii is the University of Hawaiʻi System, which consists of the research university at Mānoa, two comprehensive campuses at Hilo and West Oʻahu, and seven community colleges. Private universities include Brigham Young University–Hawaii, Chaminade University of Honolulu, Hawaii Pacific University, and Wayland Baptist University. Saint Stephen Diocesan Center is a seminary of the Roman Catholic Diocese of Honolulu. Kona hosts the University of the Nations, which is not an accredited university.

== Transportation ==
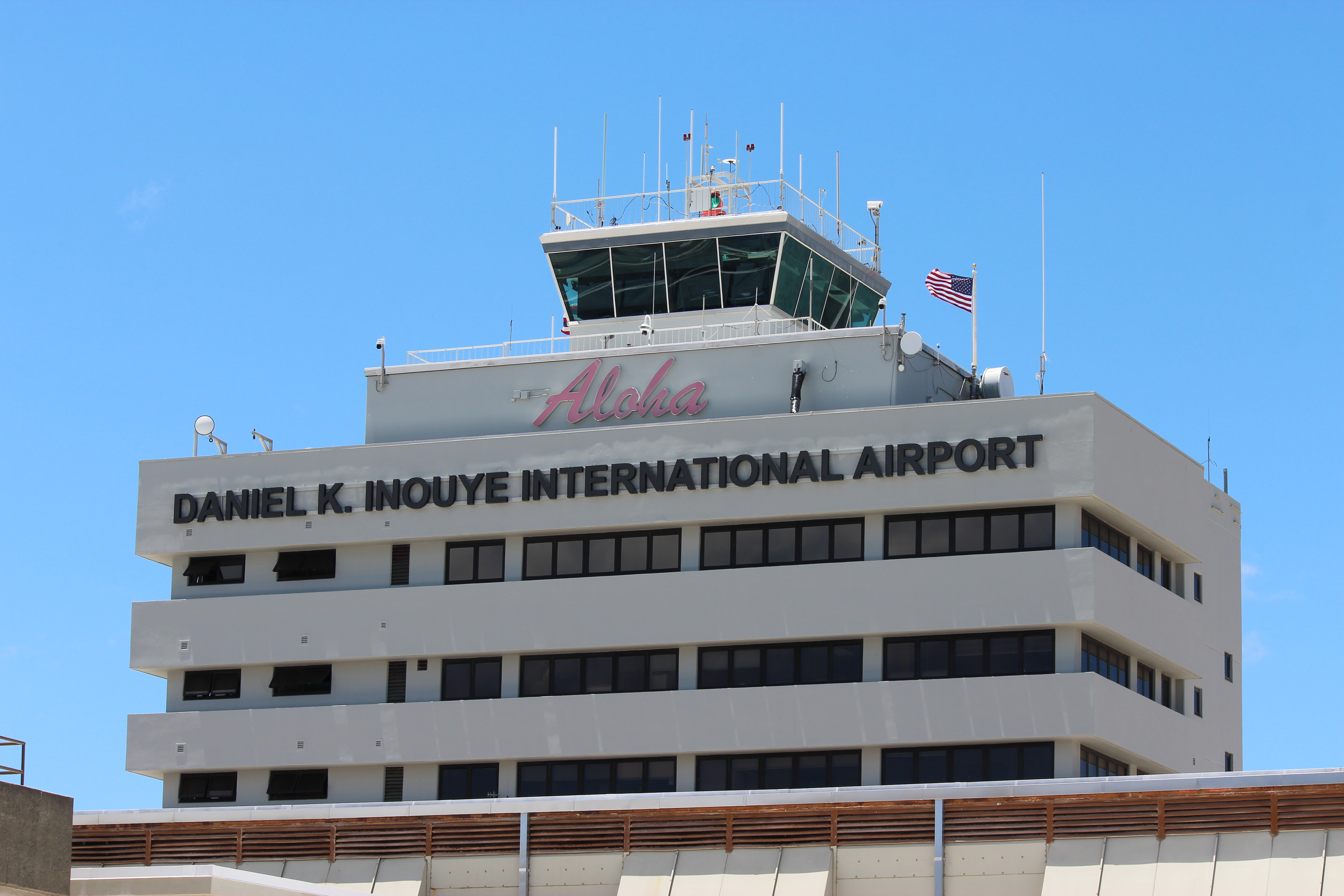
Daniel K. Inouye International Airport

A system of state highways encircles each main island. Only Oʻahu has federal highways, and is the only area outside the contiguous 48 states to have signed Interstate highways. Narrow, winding roads and congestion in populated places can slow traffic. Each major island has a public bus system.

Daniel K. Inouye International Airport (IATA: HNL), which shares runways with the adjacent Hickam Field (IATA: HIK), is the major commercial aviation hub of Hawaii. The airport was previously known as Honolulu International Airport, before its official renaming on May 30, 2017, after the late U.S. Senator Daniel K. Inouye. The commercial aviation airport offers intercontinental service to North America, Asia, Australia and Oceania. Hawaiian Airlines and Mokulele Airlines use jets to provide services between the large airports in Honolulu, Līhuʻe, Kahului, Kona and Hilo. These airlines also provide air freight services between the islands.

Until air passenger services began in the 1920s, private boats were the sole means of traveling between the islands. Seaflite operated hydrofoils between the major islands in the mid-1970s.

The Hawaii Superferry operated between Oʻahu and Maui between December 2007 and March 2009, with additional routes planned for other islands. Protests and legal problems over environmental impact statements ended the service, though the company operating Superferry has expressed a wish to recommence ferry services in the future. Currently there is a passenger ferry service in Maui County between Lanaʻi and Maui, which does not take vehicles; a passenger ferry to Molokaʻi ended in 2016. Currently Norwegian Cruise Lines and Princess Cruises provide passenger cruise ship services between the larger islands.

=== Rail ===
At one time Hawaii had a network of railroads on each of the larger islands that transported farm commodities and passengers. Most were 3 ft (914 mm) narrow gauge systems but there were some 2 ft 6 in (762 mm) gauge on some of the smaller islands. The standard gauge in the U.S. is 4 ft 8 1/2 in (1,435 mm). By far the largest railroad was the Oahu Railway and Land Company (OR&L) that ran lines from Honolulu across the western and northern part of Oʻahu.

The OR&L was important for moving troops and goods during World War II. Traffic on this line was busy enough for signals to be used to facilitate movement of trains and to require wigwag signals at some railroad crossings for the protection of motorists. The main line was officially abandoned in 1947, although part of it was bought by the U.S. Navy and operated until 1970. Thirteen miles (21 km) of track remain; preservationists occasionally run trains over a portion of this line.

Skyline is an elevated passenger rail line operated by HART, a semi-autonomous agency of the City and County of Honolulu. It was built with the intention to relieve highway congestion. A portion of Skyline opened for service in 2023, with the next phase expected to open in October 2025, and the final phase in 2031.

== Governance ==
=== Political subdivisions and local government ===
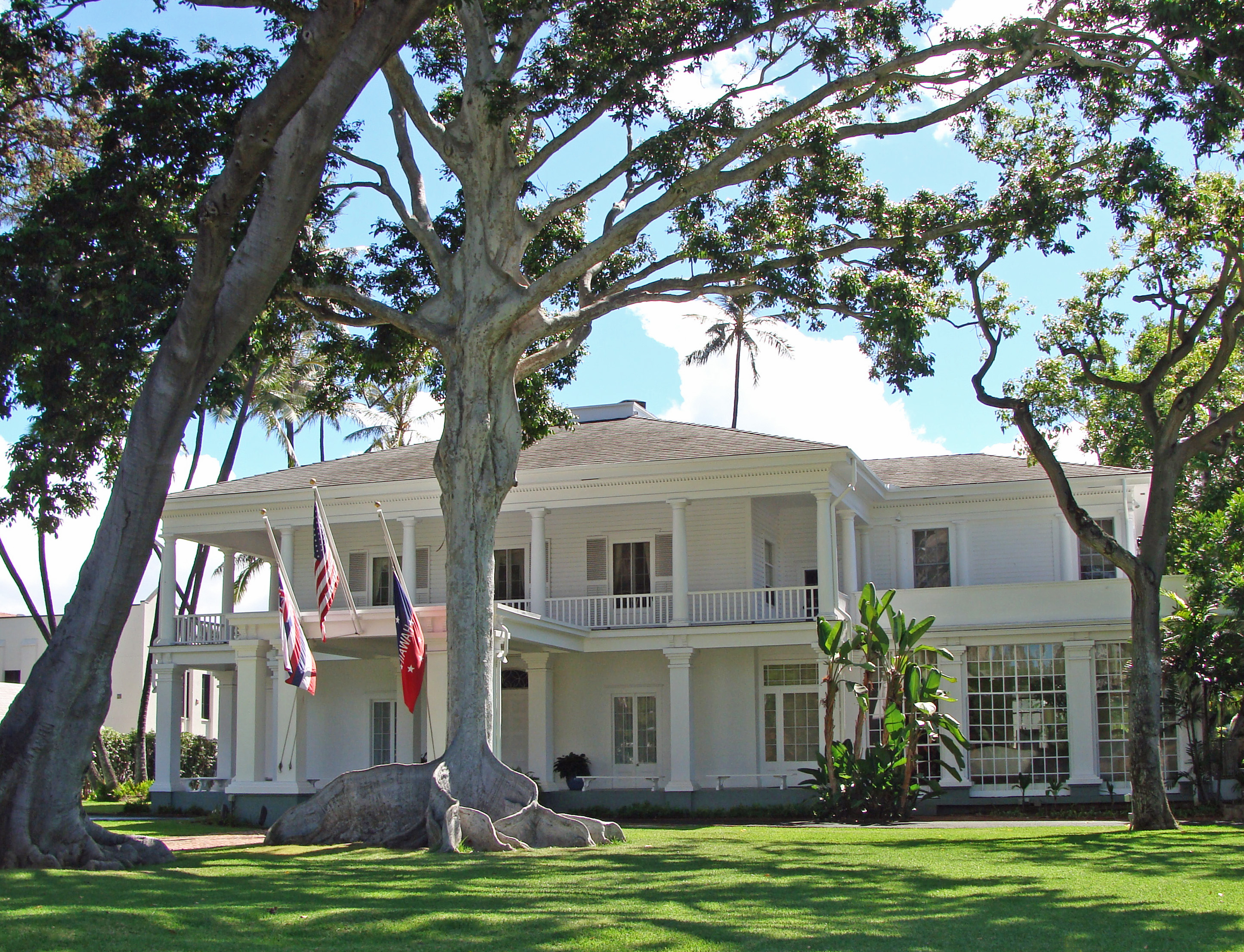
The Governor of Hawaii officially resides at Washington Place, an old American-built residence

The movement of the Hawaiian royal family from Hawaiʻi Island to Maui, and subsequently to Oʻahu, explains the modern-day distribution of population centers. Kamehameha III chose the largest city, Honolulu, as his capital because of its natural harbor—the present-day Honolulu Harbor. Now the state capital, Honolulu is located along the southeast coast of Oʻahu. The previous capital was Lahaina, Maui, and before that Kailua-Kona, Hawaiʻi. Some major towns are Hilo; Kaneohe; Kailua; Pearl City; Waipahu; Kahului; Kailua-Kona. Kīhei; and Līhuʻe.

Hawaii has five counties: the City and County of Honolulu, Hawaiʻi County, Maui County, Kauaʻi County, and Kalawao County.

Hawaii has the fewest local governments among U.S. states. Unique to this state is the lack of municipal governments. All local governments are generally administered at the county level. The only incorporated area in the state is Honolulu County, a consolidated city–county that governs the entire island of Oʻahu. County executives are referred to as mayors; these are the Mayor of Hawaiʻi County, Mayor of Honolulu, Mayor of Kauaʻi, and the Mayor of Maui. The mayors are all elected in nonpartisan elections. Kalawao County has no elected government, and as mentioned above there are no local school districts; instead, all local public education is administered at the state level by the Hawaii Department of Education. The remaining local governments are special districts.

=== State government ===
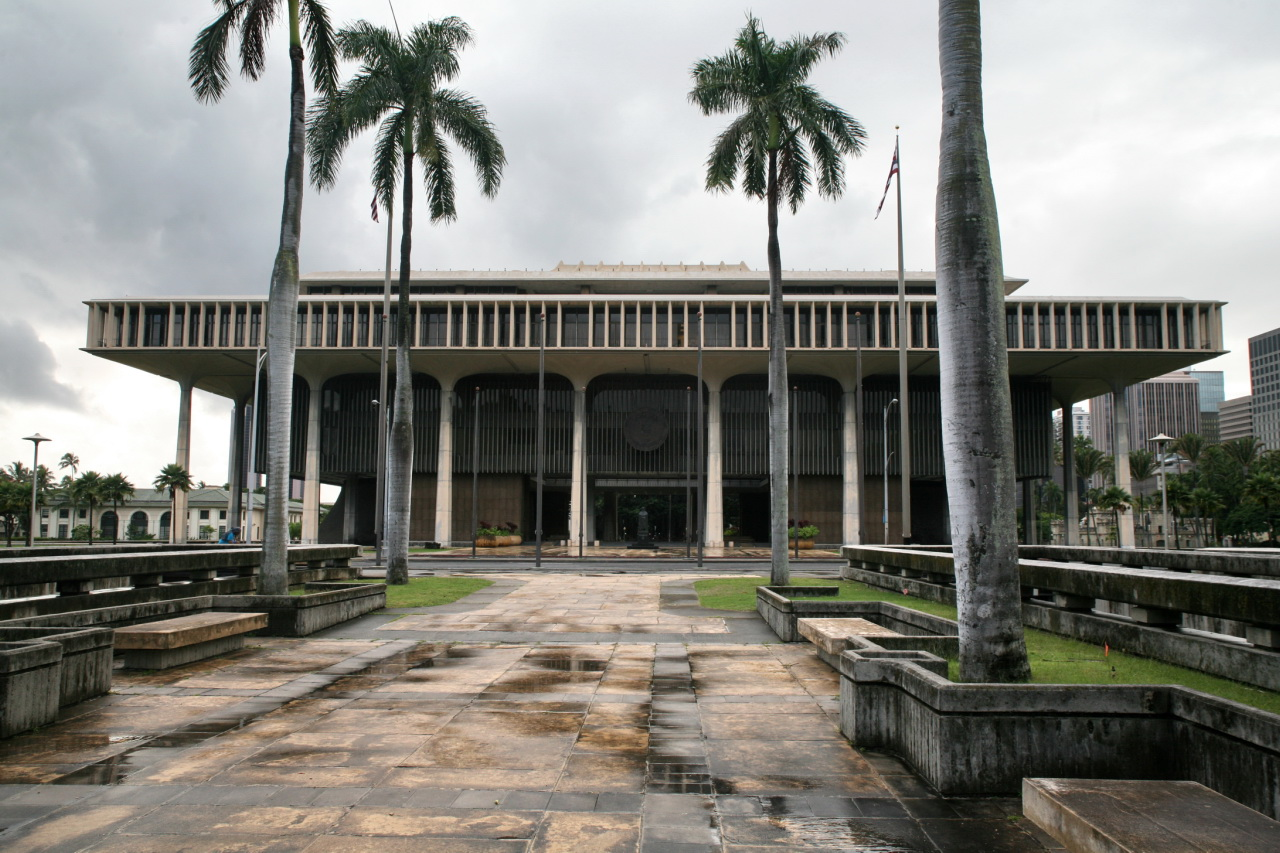
Hawaii State Capitol building

The state government of Hawaii is modeled after the federal government with adaptations originating from the kingdom era of Hawaiian history. As codified in the Constitution of Hawaii, there are three branches of government: executive, legislative, and judicial, although the Office of Hawaiian Affairs is often referred to as the fourth branch of government as it does not fall under the other three branches. The executive branch is led by the Governor of Hawaii, who is assisted by the Lieutenant Governor of Hawaii, both of whom are elected on the same ticket. The governor and the lieutenant governor are the only state public officials elected statewide; all others are appointed by the governor. The lieutenant governor acts as the Secretary of State. The governor and lieutenant governor oversee twenty agencies and departments from offices in the State Capitol. The official residence of the governor is Washington Place.

The legislative branch consists of the bicameral Hawaii State Legislature, which is composed of the 51-member Hawaii House of Representatives led by the Speaker of the House, and the 25-member Hawaii Senate led by the President of the Senate. The Legislature meets at the State Capitol. The unified judicial branch of Hawaii is the Hawaii State Judiciary. The state's highest court is the Supreme Court of Hawaii, which uses Aliʻiōlani Hale as its chambers.

=== Federal government ===
Congressional delegation for the 118th United States Congress

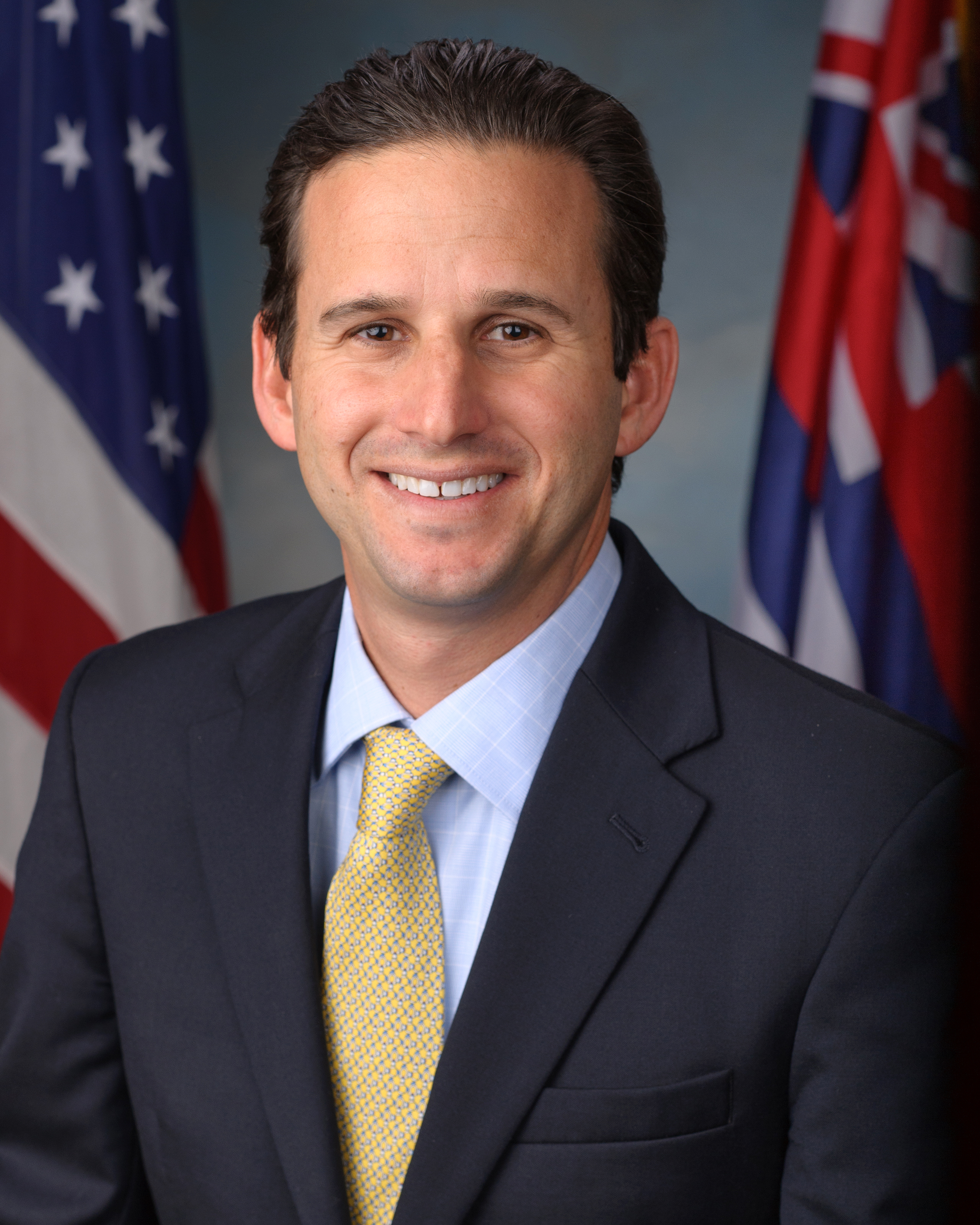
Senator Brian Schatz

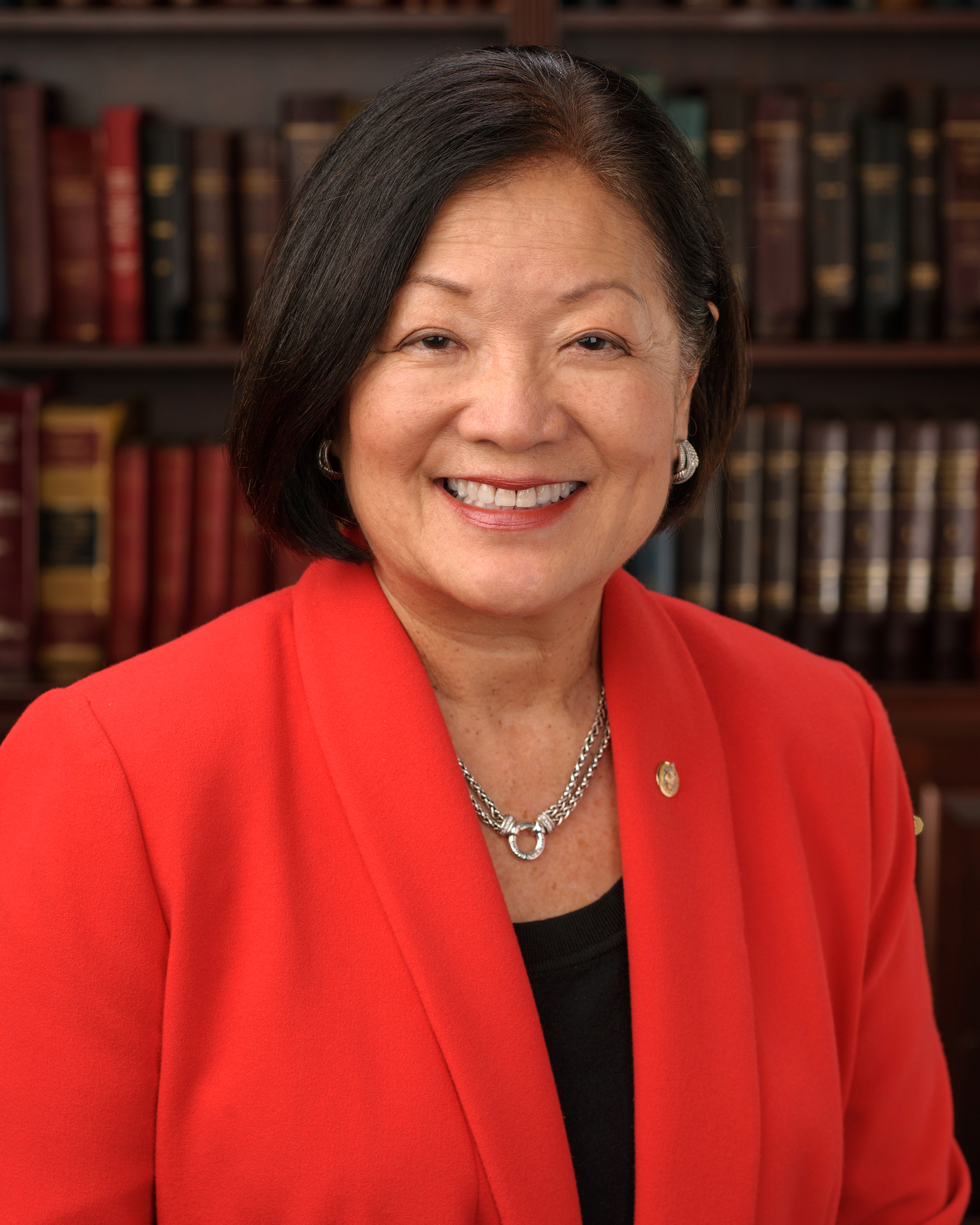
Senator Mazie Hirono

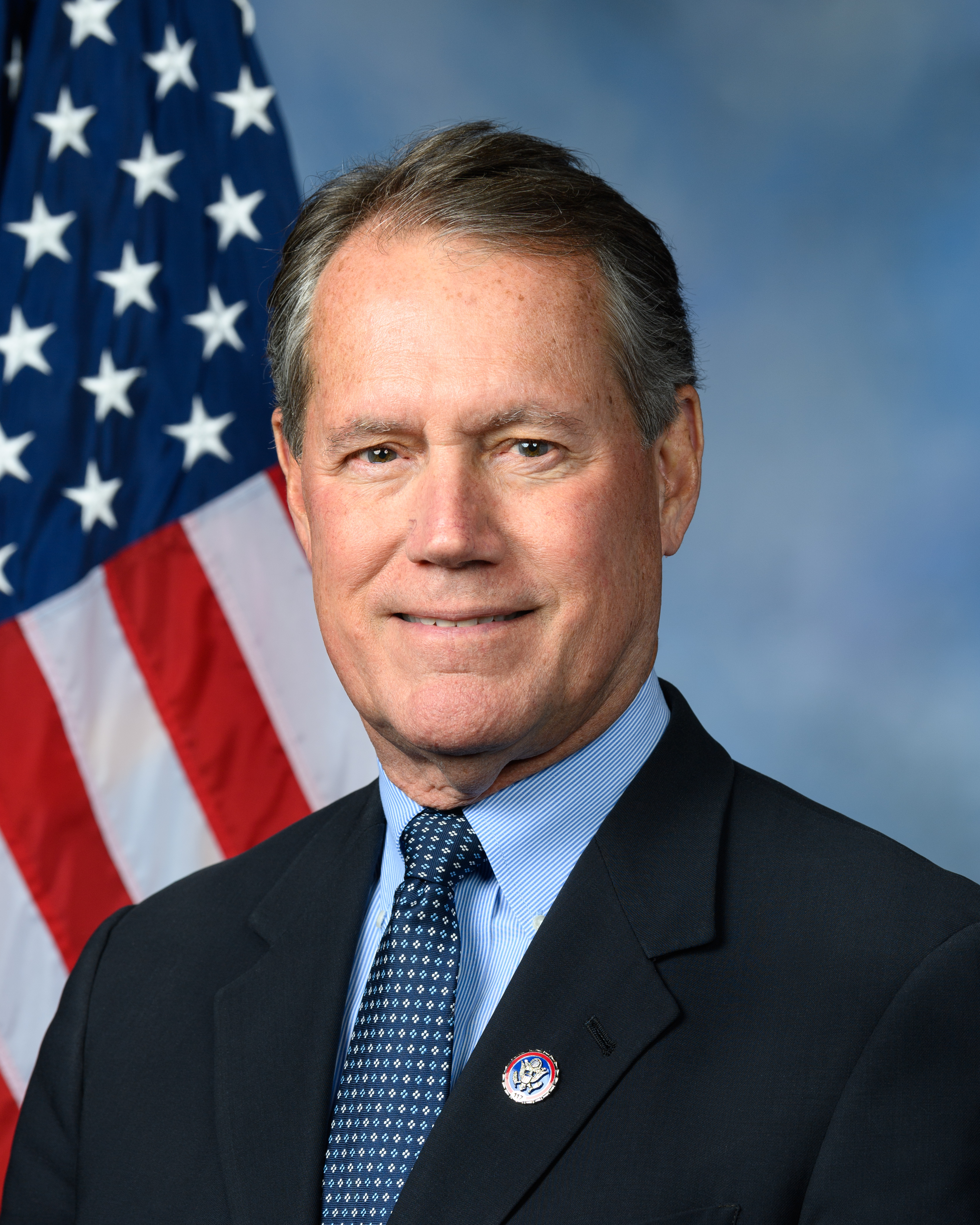
Representative Ed Case (HI-1)

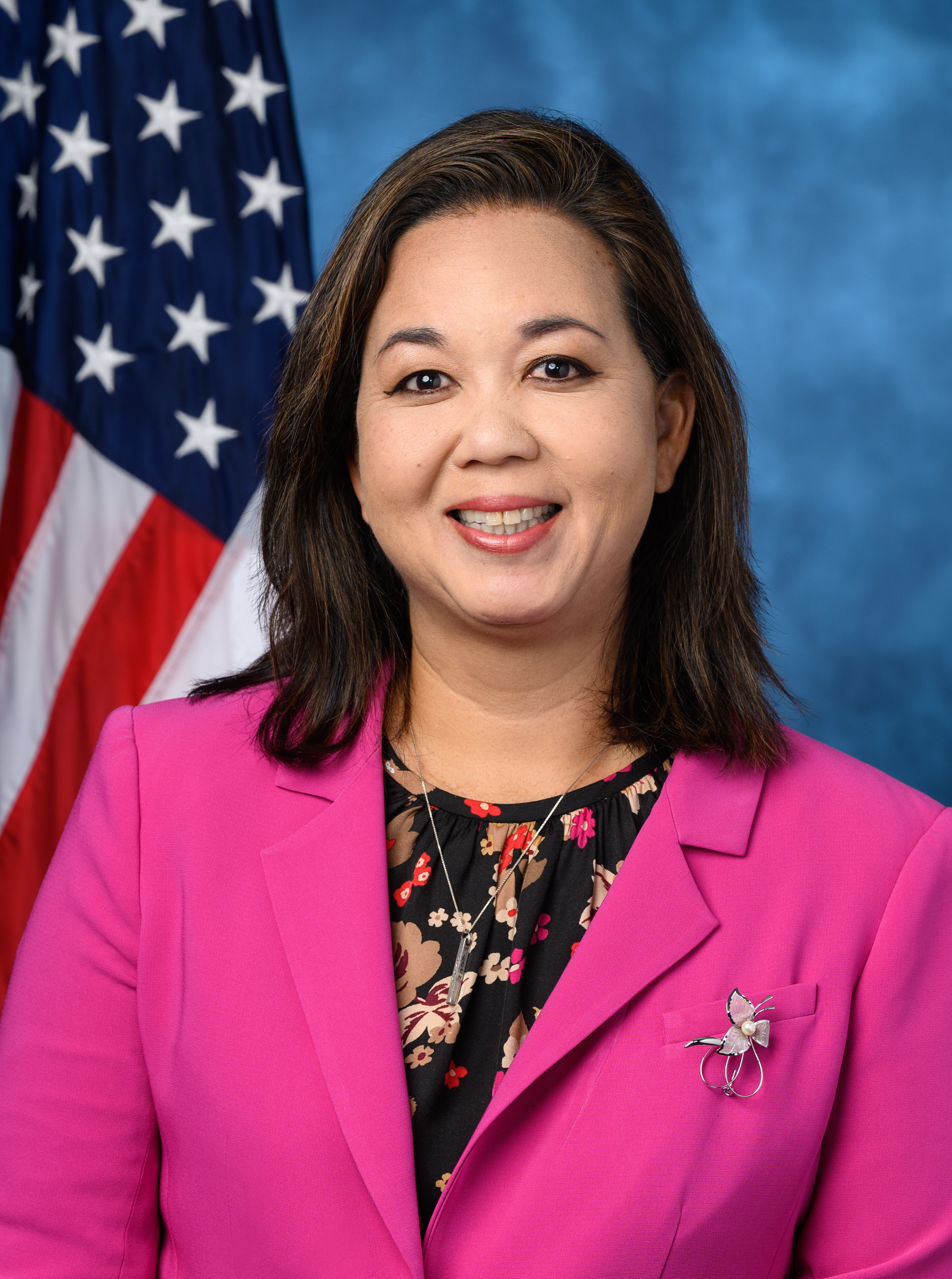
Representative Jill Tokuda (HI-2)

Hawaii is represented in the United States Congress by two senators and two representatives. As of 2026, all four seats are held by Democrats. Former representative Ed Case was elected in 2018 to the 1st congressional district. Jill Tokuda represents the 2nd congressional district, representing the rest of the state, which is largely rural and semi-rural.

Brian Schatz is the senior United States senator from Hawaii. He was appointed to the office on December 26, 2012, by Governor Neil Abercrombie, following the death of former senator Daniel Inouye. Schatz then won the 2014 special election, and the 2016 and 2022 regular elections in Hawaii as Senator.

The state's junior senator is Mazie Hirono, the former representative from the second congressional district. She won in the 2012, 2018, and 2024 elections for Senator in Hawaii, following the retirement of Daniel Akaka. Hirono is the first female Asian American senator and the first Buddhist senator.

Hawaii incurred the biggest seniority shift between the 112th and 113th Congresses. The state went from a delegation consisting of senators who were first and twenty-first in seniority (Note: Senator Inouye, who ranked first in seniority, died in December 2012. Senator Daniel Akaka, who ranked 21st of the Senate's one hundred members, retired in January 2013 after serving twenty-three years in the Senate.) to relative newcomers in Schatz and Hirono.

Federal officials in Hawaii are based at the Prince Kūhiō Federal Building near the Aloha Tower and Honolulu Harbor. The Federal Bureau of Investigation, Internal Revenue Service and the Secret Service maintain their offices there; the building is also the site of the federal District Court for the District of Hawaii and the United States Attorney for the District of Hawaii.

=== Politics ===
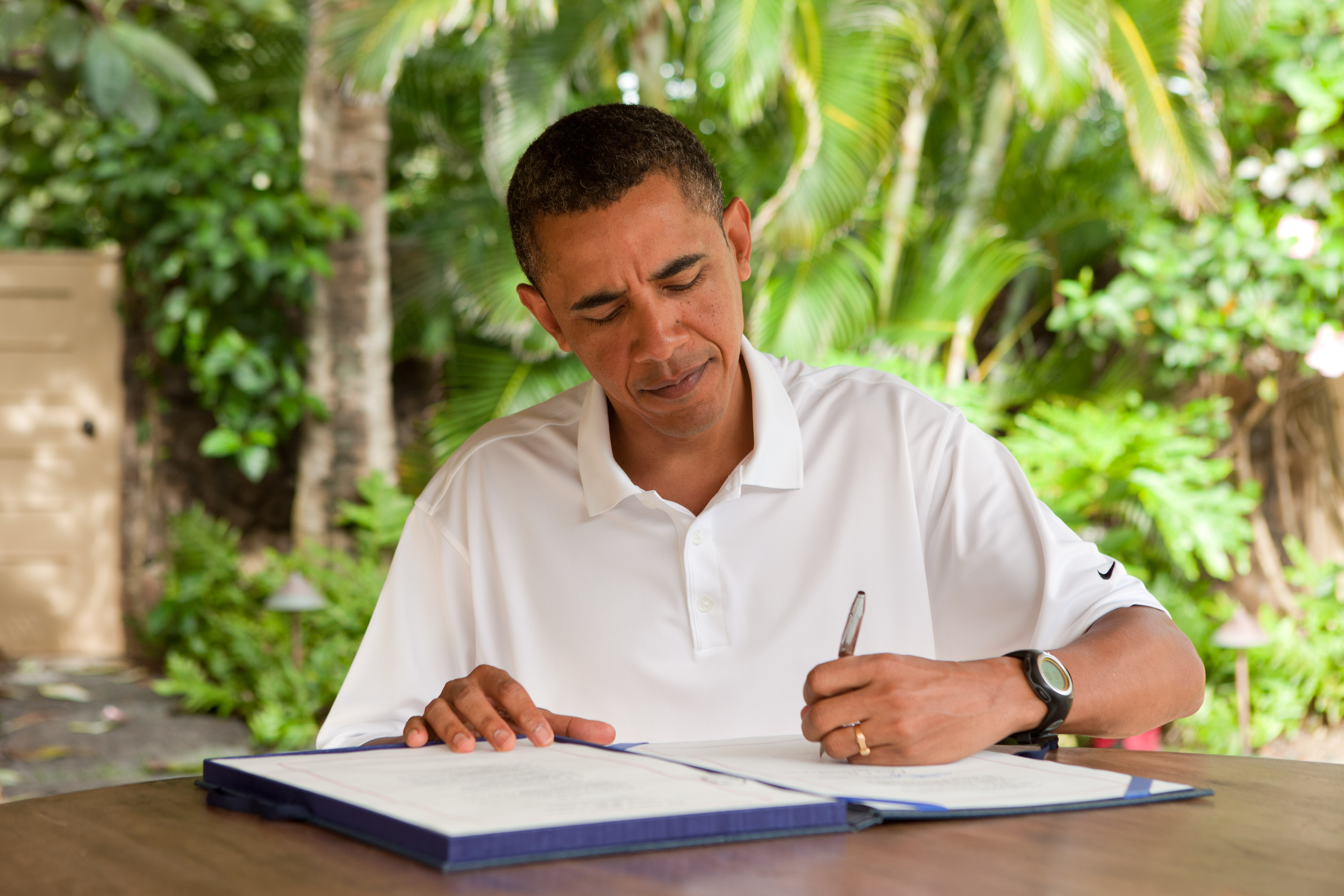
Hawaii-born President Barack Obama signs the Zadroga Act in Kailua, Hawaii

Since gaining statehood and participating in its first election in 1960, Hawaii has supported Democrats in all but two presidential elections: 1972 and 1984, both of which were landslide reelection victories for Republicans Richard Nixon and Ronald Reagan respectively. In Hawaii's statehood tenure, only Minnesota has supported Republican candidates fewer times in presidential elections. The 2022 Cook Partisan Voting Index ranks Hawaii as the third-most heavily Democratic state in the nation.

Hawaii has not elected a Republican to represent the state in the U.S. Senate since Hiram Fong in 1970; since 1977, both of the state's U.S. Senators have been Democrats.

In 2004, John Kerry won the state's four electoral votes by a margin of nine percentage points with 54% of the vote. Every county supported the Democratic candidate. In 1964, favorite son candidate senator Hiram Fong of Hawaii sought the Republican presidential nomination, while Patsy Mink ran in the Oregon primary in 1972.

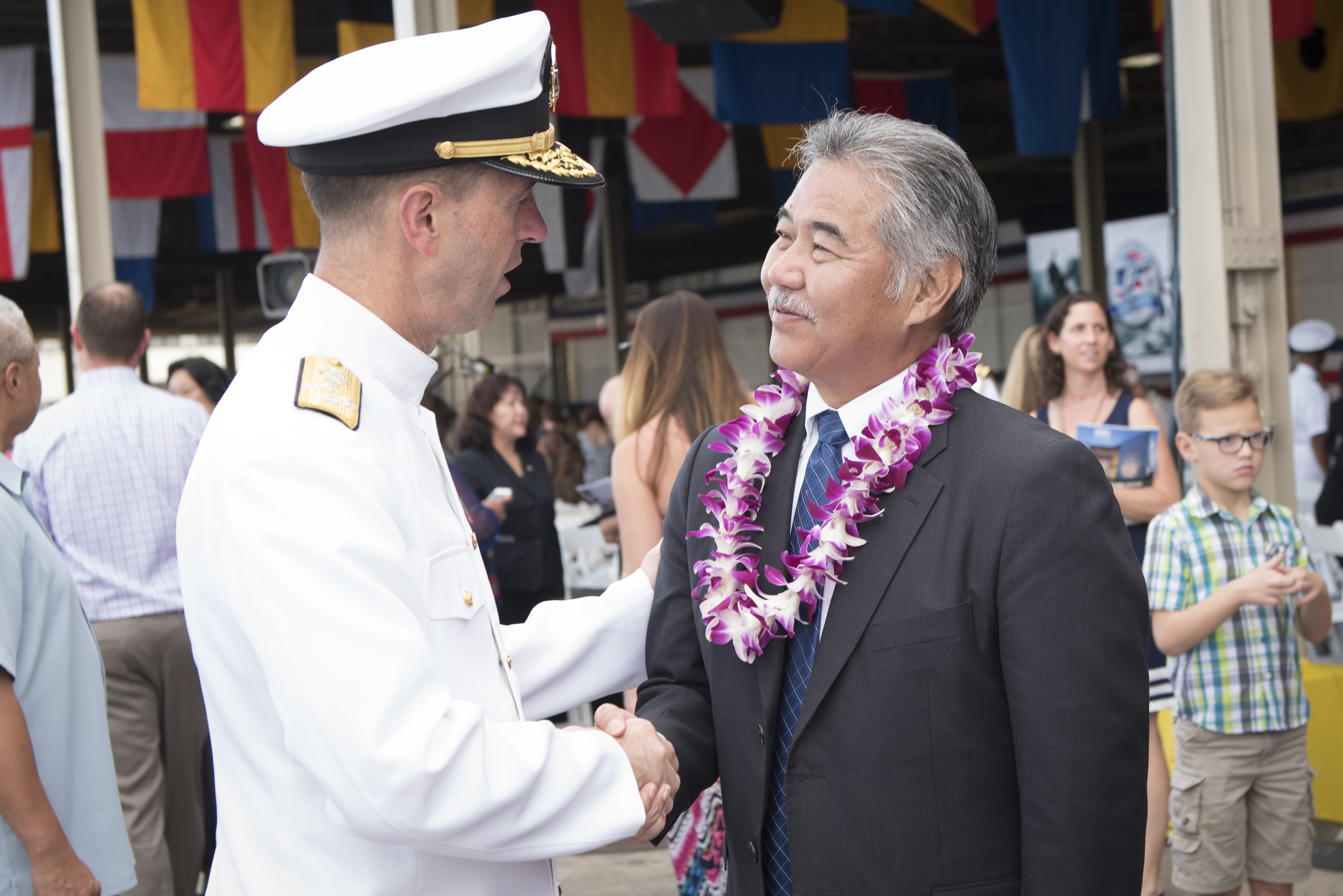
Governor David Ige with U.S. Navy admiral John Richardson at the 75th Commemoration Event of the Pearl Harbor and Oʻahu attacks in 2016

Honolulu-born Barack Obama, then serving as a United States senator from Illinois, was elected the 44th president of the United States on November 4, 2008, and was re-elected for a second term on November 6, 2012. Obama had won the Hawaii Democratic caucus on February 19, 2008, with 76% of the vote. He was the third Hawaii-born candidate to seek the nomination of a major party, the first presidential nominee and first president from Hawaii.

In a 2020 study, Hawaii was ranked as the 6th easiest state for citizens to vote in.

=== Law enforcement ===
Hawaii has a statewide sheriff department under its Department of Public Safety that provides law enforcement protection to government buildings and Daniel K. Inouye International Airport as well as correction services to all correctional facilities owned by the state.

Counties have their own respective police departments with their own jurisdictions:

- Kauaʻi County Police Department for the island of Kauaʻi
- Honolulu Police Department for Oʻahu
- Maui County Police Department for Molokaʻi, Maui and Lānaʻi
- Hawaiʻi County Police Department for the Big Island

Forensic services for all agencies in the state are provided by the Honolulu Police Department.

In January 2022, state officials proposed legislation that would split the sheriff department from the Department of Public Safety and consolidate it with the criminal investigation division from the Department of the Attorney General to create a new department that would create a statewide police agency with the ability to investigate crimes. On July 8, 2022, Governor Ige signed the bill into law to establish the Department of Law Enforcement.

== Hawaiian sovereignty movement ==
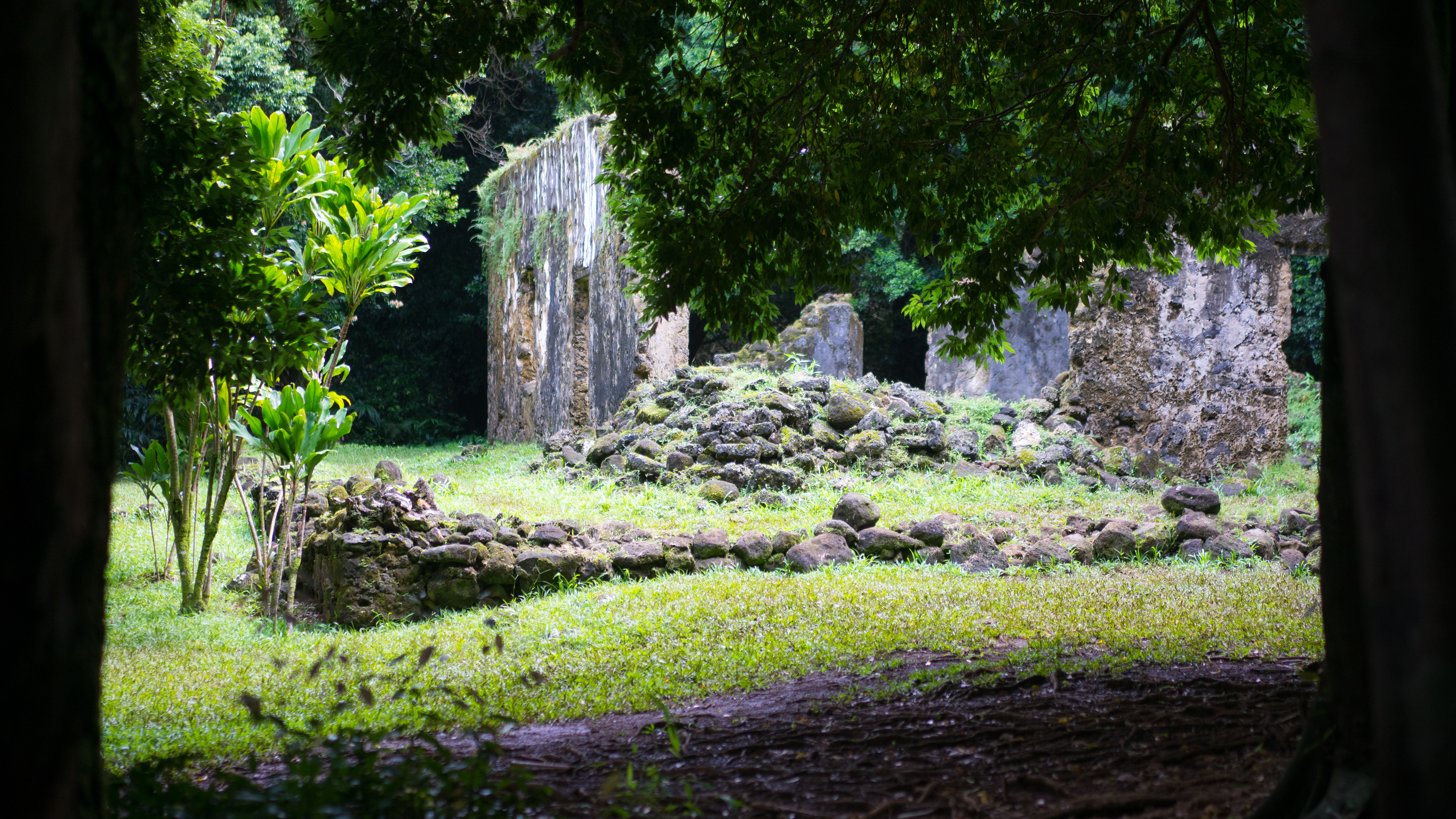
Kaniakapupu royal summer palace ruins in Honolulu County

While Hawaii is internationally recognized as a state of the United States while also being broadly accepted as such in mainstream understanding, the legality of this status has been questioned in U.S. District Court, the U.N., and other international forums. Domestically, the debate is a topic covered in the Kamehameha Schools curriculum, and in classes at the University of Hawaiʻi at Mānoa.

Political organizations seeking some form of sovereignty for Hawaii have been active since the late 19th century. Generally, their focus is on self-determination and self-governance, either for Hawaii as an independent nation (in many proposals, for "Hawaiian nationals" descended from subjects of the Hawaiian Kingdom or declaring themselves as such by choice), or for people of whole or part native Hawaiian ancestry in an indigenous "nation to nation" relationship akin to tribal sovereignty with US federal recognition of Native Hawaiians. The pro-federal recognition Akaka Bill drew substantial opposition among Hawaiian residents in the 2000s. Opponents to the tribal approach argue it is not a legitimate path to Hawaiian nationhood; they also argue that the U.S. government should not be involved in re-establishing Hawaiian sovereignty.

The Hawaiian sovereignty movement views the overthrow of the Kingdom of Hawaii in 1893 as illegal, and views the subsequent annexation of Hawaii by the United States as illegal as well; the movement seeks some form of greater autonomy for Hawaii, such as free association or independence from the United States.

Some groups also advocate some form of redress from the United States for the 1893 overthrow of Queen Liliʻuokalani, and for what is described as a prolonged military occupation beginning with the 1898 annexation. The Apology Resolution passed by US Congress in 1993 is cited as a major impetus by the movement for Hawaiian sovereignty. The sovereignty movement considers Hawaii to be an illegally occupied nation.

== International sister relationships ==
Hawaii's international sister subdivisions are:

- (Ehime Prefecture) Ehime, Japan, 2003
- (Fukuoka Prefecture) Fukuoka, Japan, 1981
- (Hiroshima Prefecture) Hiroshima, Japan, 1997
- Hokkaido, Japan, 2017
- (Okinawa Prefecture) Okinawa, Japan, 1985
- (Yamaguchi Prefecture) Yamaguchi, Japan, 2022
- Guangdong, China, 1985
- Hainan, China, 1992
- (Jeju Province) Jeju, South Korea, 1986
- Taiwan, Republic of China, 1993
- Cebu, Philippines, 1996
- (Isabela (province)) Isabela, Philippines, 2006
- Pangasinan, Philippines, 2002
- Ilocos Sur, Philippines, 1985
- Ilocos Norte, Philippines, 2005
- Rabat-Salé-Zemmour-Zaër, Morocco, 2011
- Azores Islands, Portugal, 1982
- Bali, Indonesia, 2014
- Goa, India, 2018

== See also ==
- Index of Hawaii-related articles
- List of cemeteries in Hawaii
- Outline of Hawaii
- USS Hawaii, two ships

== Notes ==
Preceded by Alaska	List of U.S. states by date of statehood Admitted on August 21, 1959 (50th)	Most recent
