= Nation of Hawaiʻi (organization) =

Hawaiian independence organization

- Nickname: Hawaiian Independence Flag, 1990s
- Website: www.nationofhawaii.org

The Nation of Hawaiʻi is a national liberation movement in favor of Hawaiian independence from the United States. It is formed by proponents of the Hawaiian sovereignty movement in resistance to what sovereignty advocates consider the occupation of Hawaii by the United States.

It is headed by Dennis Pu‘uhonua "Bumpy" Kanahele. He was elected Head of State of the Nation of Hawaiʻi by the ʻAha Kupuna, the Kupuna Council (Council of Elders) on March 6, 1994, in Kaʻanapali, Maui. An act of self determination by a council of 300 Native Hawaiian elders, elected to represent all 7 Hawaiian Islands and their communities.

== Leadership ==
The Nation of Hawai’i is led by Dennis Pu‘uhonua "Bumpy" Kanahele. He serves as the CEO of Aloha First, a non-profit organization dedicated to preserving and promoting the cultural heritage and history of Hawai'i through education. He also serves as an executive board member of the International Indian Treaty Council which is recognized by the United Nations as a category II non-governmental Organization (NGO) with consultative status with the UN Economic and Social Council.

Puʻuhonua Kanahele received media coverage in 1995 when his group gave sanctuary to Nathan Brown, a Native Hawaiian activist who had staged a public protest in 1990, refusing to pay taxes on his family's ancestral Kuleana Lands. In 2012 the Hawaiian Supreme Court confirmed the viability of Kuleana rights in the present day. He was later arrested for allegedly interfering with U.S. marshals seeking to arrest Nathan Brown.

He was eventually convicted, and sentenced to four months in federal prison, along with a probation period in which he was barred from the landbase of the Nation of Hawaiʻi, Puʻuhonua O Waimānalo and forbidden from participating in Hawaiian National Sovereignty organization efforts.

In 2002, Governor Benjamin J. Cayetano granted Bumpy Pu’uhonua Kanahele a full pardon for all past convictions by the State of Hawai’i.

Nation ministries
Office	Name
President	Dennis "Bumpy" Kanahele
Minister of Afterlife care	Richard Ledford
Minister of Agriculture	Kevin Flanagan
Minister of Commerce	John Kealoha Garcia
Ministry of Communication	Raul Nohea Goodness
Ministry of Culture and Arts	Tonu Shane
Ministry of Education	Marcamela "Juna" Dulog
Ministry of Energy	Arlen Flanagan
Ministry of Environment	Meredith Brooks
Ministry of Foreign Affairs	John Kealoha Garcia
Ministry of Health & Wellness	Dr. Cimone Kamei
Ministry of Housing	Brandon Makaawaawa
Ministry of Interior	John P. Kirkley
Ministry of Land & Natural Resources	Kealii Frank
Ministry of Transportation	Mike Stanley
Ministry of Treasury	Weston Kanahele
Ministry of Veterans Affairs	Jason Hanley

== History ==
=== August 28–30, 1992: Kupuna Council Established ===
In 1992, a council of Native Hawaiian elders began to gather and self-organize to discuss the future of Hawai’i, in anticipation of the Apology Resolution passing into Law. This council held open door meetings that were available to any Native Hawaiian community elder (Kupuna) who wanted to join. Eventually, it consisted of more than 300 elders from every Hawaiian island in Hawai’i, who represented their islands and their communities.

The first official conference of the `Aha Kuka O Na Kupuna (Kupuna Council) was held on August 28–30, 1992 in Mololi’i, South Kona, Big Island, Hawai’i. This conference created and ratified the "Charter for Self-Government, Resolution 92-01”, in which the Kupuna Council "recognized their [Native Hawaiian's] inherent and traditional right to self-government" and "asserted their sovereign jurisdiction and plenary authority." The Resolution also adopted a charter for self-government, and established the ‘Ohana Council (Family Council), which was open to all in the community.

=== 1993 Land Occupation at Kaupō Beach ===
In 1993, Pu’uhonua Kanahele organized a displaced and houseless group of more than 300 Native Hawaiians (Kanaka Maoli) living in Waimānalo to occupy Kaupō Beach, near Makapu'u Lighthouse. This was a second attempt to establish a sovereign Hawaiian National land base, independent from the United States of America.

The site was chosen for its connection to a traditional Hawaiian Heiau (religious temple) established by Kamehameha I in the late 1700s, which was dismantled in 1964 to build Sea Life Park, a tourist attraction located across the street from the beach. Puʻuhonua Kanahele used his own money to go to Sears in Hawai'i to purchase tents for houseless families to live in.

The camp was used to open negotiations with the State of Hawai'i and raise awareness over the growing houseless problem across Hawai'i, as the majority of the State's houseless population was Native Hawaiian.

As Pu’uhonua Kanahele stated, "The homeless problem is a Hawaiian problem. You cannot fix homelessness in Hawai'i without addressing the displacement of the Native Hawaiian people as a direct result of the illegal overthrow of the Hawaiian Kingdom." Many of the camp residents were previously residents of the Waimānalo Hawaiian Homesteads that were forced into houselessness as a result of overcrowding in their family homes and a lack of housing options provided by the Department of Hawaiian Homelands.

Over the course of the occupation, the families reestablished a network of traditional loʻi kalo, Native Hawaiian agricultural systems for cultivating the Hawaiian staple crop, kalo (taro) at Kaupō Beach. Housing structures were also assembled, signaling the movement's commitment to occupying the beach for the long term.

The occupation at Kaupō Beach lasted for 15 months. It ended when an agreement was reached with the Department of Land and Natural Resources (DLNR) to establish Pu'uhonua O Waimanalo, a permanent land base for the Nation of Hawai'i, located on 45 acres of Hawaiian Kingdom Crown Lands in Waimānalo, O'ahu. Many of the housing structures from the beach occupation were transported to the new land base.

=== July 1, 1993 – Hawaiian Sovereignty Advisory Commission Appointment to discuss the future ===
A month after the occupation of Kaupō Beach, Waimānalo began, Pu’uhonua Kanahele was appointed to the 21-member Hawaiian Sovereignty Advisory Commission (HSAC) by Hawai’i Governor, John D. Waihe‘e.

"It is my sincere hope that the sovereignty of the Hawaiian people will be restored in my lifetime," says US Sen. Daniel Inouye (D) of Hawaii. "I stand ready and willing to act on ... legislation at the request of and on behalf of the American people."

"There are few today who doubt that sovereignty will happen," Governor Waihe’e commented on the effort. "It's a matter of how, when, and in what form."

=== November 23, 1993 – Apology Law signed into Law ===
President Bill Clinton enacts U.S. Public Law 103-150–Apology Law (a.k.a. Apology Bill or Apology Resolution) which, "Apologizes to Native Hawaiians on behalf of the people of the United States for the overthrow of the Kingdom of Hawaii on January 17, 1893 with the participation of agents and citizens of the United States, and the deprivation of the rights of Native Hawaiians to self-determination."

The "Apology Resolution," acknowledges, "the indigenous Hawaiian people never directly relinquished their claims to their inherent sovereignty as a people or over their national lands to the United States, either through their monarchy or through a plebiscite or referendum."

Further, the Resolution states its, "commitment to acknowledge the ramifications of the overthrow of the Kingdom of Hawaii, in order to provide a proper foundation for reconciliation between the United States and the Native Hawaiian people."

This Resolution was the first of its kind that expressly acknowledged the participation of the United States in the overthrow of the Hawaiian Kingdom, in violation of the 1849 Treaty of Friendship, Commerce and Navigation between the United States of America and the Hawaiian Kingdom.

This empowered Pu’uhonua Kanehele to continue efforts to claim the rights of Native Hawaiian self determination over their national homelands as well as their right to declare independence from the United States.

=== December 28, 1993– Restoration of the Independent Nation State of Hawai’i Under International Law by Francis Boyle, Talk in Hawai’i ===
On December 28, 1993, University of Illinois law professor Francis Boyle, held a talk on the Restoration of the Independent Nation State of Hawai’i Under International Law at Mabel Smyth Hall, Honolulu, O'ahu, Hawai`i on request by the State of Hawai’i's Sovereignty Advisory Commission (HSAC).

The HSAC hired Boyle to review the implications of the Apology Resolution and discusses legal pathways forward towards Native Hawaiian self determination.

Professor Boyle delivered legal testimony interpreting the implications of U.S. Public Law 103-150 for the restoration of the independent Nation State of Hawai`i under international law:

"...now the United States government, after one hundred years, has finally and officially conceded, as a matter of United States law, that Native Hawaiian people have the right to restore the Independent Nation State that you had in 1893 when the United States government came and destroyed it. ...as a matter of international law, the Native Hawaiian people have the right to go out now and certainly proclaim the restoration of that State..."

=== January 1994: Kanahele Resignation from HSAC ===
The Hawaiian Sovereignty Advisory Commission (HSAC), of which Puʻuhonua Kanhele was a member, was established and administered by the State of Hawai’i.

The HSAC ultimately recommended pursuing "Federal Recognition" of Native Hawaiians as the reconciliation process direction with the Department of Interiror, which would deem Native Hawaiians as a "Nation within a Nation", similar to a Native American Tribe. Federal Recognition would therefore not allow Hawaiians to exercise their inherent sovereignty to reclaim land and reestablish a "Sovereign State".

This was counter to Pu’uhonua Kanahele's beliefs and he therefore officially resigned from the HSAC in January 1994 to focus on establishing the Nation of Hawai’i as a true Sovereign State.

=== January 16, 1994 Hawai’i Proclamation Restoring the Independence of the Sovereign Nation State of Hawai’i, ‘Iolani Palace, Honolulu, O’ahu, Hawai’i ===
On January 16, 1994, 'Aha Kupuna, the Kupuna Council (Council of Elders) publicly proclaimed on behalf of all Kanaka Maoli (Native Hawaiian people) at ‘Iolani Palace, their right of self-determination and re-establish the Independent and Sovereign Nation of Hawai`i, that was illegally taken from the Kanaka Maoli on January 17, 1893.

This Proclamation empowered the 'Aha Kupuna as the Provisional Government of Hawai`i, to provide measures of development for the restoration of independence, leading to a Constitutional Convention.

Excerpts from the Proclamation Restoring the Independence of the Sovereign Nation State of Hawai’i:

"Today, We, the Kanaka Maoli, proclaim our Right of self-determination as a People in accordance with Article 1 (2) of the United Nations Charter, and join the World Community of States as an Independent and Sovereign Nation. We hereby reestablish our Independent and Sovereign Nation of Hawai`i, that was illegally taken from the Kanaka Maoli on January 17, 1893."

"We, the Kanaka Maoli, respectfully continue to seek the guidance and consultation of our Kupuna, be it Spiritually, Mentally, Physically, Socially or Politically, in consultation and decisions that affect our lives, to restore and protect the customs and teachings of our culture, language and knowledge from being exploited, desecrated and driven to eventual extinction. For all these reasons, the Kupuna Council will serve as the Provisional Government of the Independent and Sovereign Nation of Hawai`i, to provide measures of development, until such time when the Kanaka Maoli will convene a Constitutional Convention."

"We, the Kanaka Maoli, today embody within our governmental structure traditional customs and culture of the `Aha Kuka O Na Kupuna (Council of Elders), based on mutual respect, traditional practice, and family order. Their consultation on many decisions is highly regarded as the basis of all authority and principle, as handed down through generations of teachings. The Kanaka Maoli's natural ability and practice of Natural Law, commonly known and exercised, due to our deep spiritual connection to nature, and by the use, application and practice of the Laws of Nature, then as now. We, the Kanaka Maoli, believe that all things have life, be they animate or inanimate, as everything has been derived and created from one Source, the Creator."

"Therefore, the Kupuna, in General Council Assembled, by the Authority recognized and vested in the Aha Kuka O Ka Ohana, in the name of the Kanaka Maoli people, to preserve and to forevermore cultivate the Heritage and Culture of the Kanaka Maoli, do solemnly publish, declare and proclaim that the Independent and Sovereign Nation of Hawai`i, is free and absolved from any other political connection with any other Nation State. Those who disregard the Principles and Rule of the Law of Nations, Justice, Integrity, Morality of Character, and Humanity, by force and acts of aggression, now illegally occupy our Territory."

=== February 1994 ‘Aha Kupuna Assemblies are held on each Island in preparation for General Assembly Convention ===
‘Aha Kupuna Assemblies are organized and held on each island, officially electing an ‘Aha Kupuna Council to represent their island at the First Legislative Session of the Provisional Government which was planning to meet to discuss and plan the upcoming Constitutional Convention.

Throughout the year, Kanaka Maoli and supporters on all islands organize themselves, educate the community, and draft a constitution.

=== March 4–6, 1994: General Assembly Convention held, First Legislative Session of the Provisional Government of Hawai`i ===
Approximately 300 Kupuna gather at Ka’anapali, Maui, for the First Legislative Session of the Provisional Government.

Na Kupuna enacted Resolutions 94-001 through 94-006, establishing the foundation for the political development process leading to the convening of Ke `Aha Kanawai Kumu (the Constitutional Convention). They nominate and elect Pu`uhonua Kanahele as Alaka`i (Head of State) for the Provisional Government. He is given the mandate to act on behalf of the people to pursue the full restoration of sovereignty for Hawai`i.

Resolution 94-001: States that Na Kupuna will come together at a Constitutional Convention to write the Kanawai Kumu (Organic Act), with the purpose of developing a Permanent Government. Na Kupuna give recognition to their own process as the only real and legal process. Na Kupuna will be the only ones to enact this Ka’hawai Kumu (law).

Resolution 94-002: Create equal representation for all the people and all the Islands.

Resolution 94-003: Interim Government is established as Ke ‘Aupuni Kuikawa O Ka Mokuaina Lahui o Hawai’i (Interim Government of the Nation of Hawai’i) is established, pursuant to the Proclamation of Restoration of January 16, 1994. When the Permanent Government is established, then that name will dissolve.

Resolution 94-004: Select Interim delegates that will concentrate on Ad Hoc Committees and prepare proposals and draft resolutions for the Kanawai Kumu Convention.

Resolution 94-005: Establish 12 Ministries.

Resolution 94-006: Nominate Pu’uhonua Kanahele as Head of State. The Head of State can vote, but has no power of veto over the Assembly. The Head of State will sign into law all Legislation produced by the 'Aha Kupuna.

Between April and September 1994, Educational Workshops and Preparatory Conventions are held on Hawai`i, Moloka`i, Maui, O’ahu and Kaua’i to draft a Constitution.

=== June 1994: Kaupō Beach Occupation Ends, Pu’uhonua O Waimanalo Established ===
The occupation at Kaupō Beach ended as the Department of Land and Natural Resources (DLNR) negotiates with Puʻuhonua Kanahele to provide a parcel of land to move his beach occupation to. The occupation moves up to the parcel while lease negotiations remain ongoing and continue until 2001.

DLNR leases 45 acres of State of Hawai'i "Ceded Lands", former Hawaiian Kingdom Crown Lands in Waimānalo in March 2001, establishing Pu’uohuna O Waimānalo ("Refuge of Waimanalo") which today serves as the land base for the Nation of Hawaiʻi's ongoing efforts to support the rights of Native Hawaiian self determination.

The lease includes a clause that states the lands are to be held in trust until the "Recognition of a Sovereign and Independent Nation of Hawaii" by the United States. This clause was modeled after the Protect Kahoʻolawe ʻOhana's Lease for the Hawaiian Island of Kahoʻolawe, following their successful negotiations to end the US Navy's bombing of the Island.

=== October 1994 – January 1995: ‘Aha Kanawai Kumu (Constitutional Convention) ratifies the Nation of Hawai’i Constitution ===
October 1994: the 1st 'Aha Kumu Kanawai (Constitutional Convention), was held at Pu'uhonua O Waimanalo, O’ahu for the purpose of developing a permanent government. During the 'Aha Kumu Kanawai, a working Kanawai Kumu (Organic document) was drafted and ratified by the Kupuna Council.

November 10–13: 1994 Ratification of the Nation of Hawai’i Constitution

November 1994: The Kupuna Council gathered for a 2nd 'Aha Kumu Kanawai, to further work on the Constitution.

January 12–15, 1995: Third Session of the Constitutional Convention

January 1995: the 'Aha Kumu Kanawai reconvened. The Organic document is finalized and ratified by the Kupuna Council.

=== January 16, 1995 Promulgation of the Nation of Hawai’i Constitution ===
On January 16, 1995, 379 people gathered at ‘Iolani Palace, in Honolulu, Hawai’i to sign the Hawai’i Constitution on behalf of its 10,000 members.

Per the Hawai’i Constitution, the Legislative General Assembly of the Nation of Hawai’i consists of the Citizens Assembly, Na Kupuna Council (Council of Elders), and elect a Head of State. Pu’uhonua D.K.B. Kanahele was elected as Head of State, and remains in this office to date.

The Nation of Hawaiʻi is administratively subdivided into 5 mokupuni (counties): Hawaiʻi, Maui, Molokaʻi, Oʻahu, Kauaʻi, with Lānaʻi, Niʻihau and Kahoʻolawe, held in trust. The Hawai’i Constitution includes open and free elections, and the opportunity for naturalized citizenship.

=== January 17, 1995 Declaration of National State of Emergency ===
On January 17, 1995, a "Declaration of National State of Emergency" was called by Head of State, Pu’uhonua D.K.B. Kanahele, in order to "execute business of the Nation in Transitional Preparedness". All Executive Orders issued by the Head of State are submitted as proposed legislation to the Legislature General Assembly when it next convenes. "This measure is determined as expedient and necessary under the National State of Emergency of our Country, until such a time that Independence has been fully restored by full diplomatic de jure recognition from the United States of America."

=== August 2, 1995 Pu’uhonua Kanahele Arrested by Federal Agents ===
Pu`uhonua Kanahele was indicted and arrested at Honolulu Airport on Aug. 2, 1995 by U.S. federal marshals, while traveling with his wife. He was held without bail for more than three months, widely considered to be a political prisoner.

A District of Hawaiʻi grand jury charged him with one misdemeanor, interfering with a police officer, and two felonies, harboring a fugitive and interfering with a United States Marshal while he was engaged in official duty.

The charges stemmed from allegations that Pu'uhonua Kanahele sheltered federal fugitive Nathan Brown and impeded efforts to arrest him. Brown, an outspoken Native Hawaiian activist and Kanahele's cousin, had refused to serve a 78-month prison sentence for tax evasion on his family's ancestral kuleana lands. Brown was holding public rallys throughout this time period, arguing that Native Hawaiians should not be taxed on their ancestral kuleana lands, property granted to Native Hawaiians by the Kingdom of Hawai'i under the 1850 Kuleana Act. This Act provided Native Hawaiians fee simple title to land parcels they occupied and cultivated in the mid 1800s, if they had gone through the formal process to claim them. In 2012, the Hawaiian Supreme Court confirmed the viability of Kuleana rights in the present day.

The incidents involving Brown occurred on January 27 and March 16, 1994, yet Kanahele was not arrested and charged until 16 months later. Legal scholar William H. Rodgers argued in a 1996 Washington Law Review article that this delay demonstrated political retaliation rather than a routine prosecution.

Kanahele’s trial began on August 11, 1995, before District Judge Helen Gillmor. On October 31, 1995, Judge Gillmor declared a mistrial after allegations of juror misconduct, including a juror conducting independent research on the Fourth Amendment, raising speculation about jury tampering. During this period, Kanahele remained imprisoned without bail.

On November 13, 1995, after 118 days in custody, Judge David Ezra ordered Kanahele released under restrictive conditions at a halfway house in Honolulu. On January 22, 1996, Judge Gillmor denied a defense motion to dismiss the case on double jeopardy grounds.

One month later, on Feb. 13, 1996, U.S. District Judge Helen Gillmor modified Kanaheleʻs bail to allow his return to his Waimānalo home with his wife and children, but under highly restrictive conditions. These included prohibiting him from visiting Nation of Hawaiʻi's land base "Pu'uhonua O Waimānalo" or any Waimānalo location other than his home. Other conditions include a $50,000 signature bond, electronic monitoring, a curfew from 10 p.m. to 7 a. m. with no visitors after 10 p.m., no more than five visitors at any time, and no meetings or business at his home. "The home is to be used for residential purposes only," the order stated.

On Dec. 12, 1996, the Ninth Circuit Court issued a ruling denying Kanahele's motion for dismissal of the case. and in May 1997, the U.S. Supreme Court declined to hear his appeal. A retrial was scheduled for September 16, 1997, but four days prior, on September 12, Kanahele entered a plea agreement. He pled guilty to one felony count of obstructing a deputy U.S. Marshal’s attempt to arrest Nathan Brown in 1994. In exchange, prosecutors dismissed the remaining counts.

On February 5, 1998, Judge Gillmor sentenced Kanahele to four months in prison, with credit for the 3.5 months he had already served, a $500 fine, and four months of electronic monitoring. Upon release, Kanahele declared, "I'm never going to give up on sovereignty."

His monitoring device was removed on July 13, 1998, nearly three years after his initial arrest.

In 2002, Governor Benjamin J. Cayetano granted Pu’uhonua Kanahele a full pardon for all past convictions by the State of Hawai’i.

=== 1996 Washington Law Review on Kanahele Trial ===
In 1996, The Washington Law Review Association published an article by legal scholar Bill Rodgers reviewing the trial of Puʻuhonua Kanahele entitled, "Native Hawaiian Sovereignty: The Sense of Justice and the Justice Offense: Native Hawaiian Sovereignty and the second "Trial of the Century" citing the arrest and trial as politically motivated to prevent Kanehele from continuing to pursue the organizing efforts of the Nation of Hawaii.

Rodgers, who received his B.A. from Harvard and his J.D. from Columbia Law School, was a pioneering University of Washington law professor and nationally recognized scholar of environmental and Indian law, whose influential teaching, litigation, and writings shaped U.S. environmental policy, tribal sovereignty, and generations of lawyers.

He argued that Puʻuhonua Kanahele's case was a "political trial" rooted in retaliation against the Hawaiian sovereignty movement and Puʻuhonua Kanahele's organizing efforts with the Nation of Hawaiʻi. Following the 1993 U.S. Apology Resolution, Kanahele had asserted Hawaii's independence, issued "war crimes" notices to public officials, and organized Native Hawaiians to form a new government. Rodgers contended that the denial of bail, restrictions on courtroom defenses, and the government’s trial strategy reflected a desire to punish dissent rather than protect public safety.

=== April, 2017, Nation of Hawaiʻi joins United Nations Permanent Forum on Indigenous Issues (UNPFII) ===
The Nation of Hawai'i became a member of the United Nations Permanent Forum on Indigenous Issues (UNPFII) in April 2017. The Nation of Hawai'i participates in the UNPFII annually to address indigenous issues related to economic and social development, culture, the environment, education, health, and human rights.

== Future plans ==
Nation of Hawaiʻi hosts regular community days such as land restoration days, free food distributions and monthly markets, intended to support local Native Hawaiian small businesses, film screenings, discussions on economic independence and school work days for students to learn about food security.

In 2023, Nation of Hawai'i began to restore the ancient rock wall terraced traditional agriculture site on their property along the Waimānalo stream. They allegedly host 200+ volunteers on the last Saturday of each month for "Aloha 'Āina" days as they restore the traditional ahupua'a and lo'i kalo regenerative agriculture systems.
