= Bumpy Kanahele =

Hawaiian nationalist leader

Leader of the Nation of Hawai'i
- Incumbent
- Assumed office March 6, 1994
- Preceded by: Office established

Personal details
- Born: Dennis Pu‘uhonua Kanahele
- Occupation: Hawaiian nationalist leader and community organizer
- Website: www.nationofhawaii.org

Dennis "Bumpy" Pu‘uhonua Kanahele is a Kanaka Maoli (Native Hawaiian), Hawaiian National Independence Advocate. He serves as President and Head of State of the Nation of Hawai'i. He was elected on March 6, 1994 by the 'Aha Kupuna, the Kupuna Council (Council of Elders) at Kaʻanapali, Maui, an act of self-determination by a council of 300 Native Hawaiian elders representing all seven Hawaiian islands and their communities.

He spearheaded the founding of Pu‘uhonua o Waimānalo, a Hawaiian cultural village and traditional lo‘i kalo (taro paddy) agricultural restoration project in Waimānalo, Hawai‘i. Pu‘uhonua is a Hawaiian word meaning "sanctuary" or "place of refuge".

The Nation of Hawai‘i group, which administers the village, regards itself as a sovereign government under international law, acting as a successor state to the Kingdom of Hawai‘i and therefore not subject to United States rule. Kanahele claims to be a descendant of King Kamehameha I. In the late 1980s and early 1990s, Kanahele became known for militant activism on behalf of Hawaiian sovereignty, publicly resisting U.S. federal and state laws.

== Activism ==
In 1993—the 100th anniversary of the overthrow of the Kingdom of Hawai‘i, and the year in which the U.S. passed a joint resolution of Congress apologizing for that action—Kanahele led 300 people in an occupation of Makapu‘u beach. After 15 months, Governor John D. Waihee III proposed a deal: If Kanahele and his group would leave Makapuʻu beach peacefully, the state would give them a 45-acre (18 hectare) parcel above Waimānalo in the foothills of the Ko‘olau Mountains. Kanahele's group signed a renewable 55-year lease at a cost of $3,000 a year, and in June 1994, Pu‘uhonua o Waimānalo came into being.

In 1998, Kanahele was sentenced to four months in prison for interfering with U.S. marshals seeking to arrest a federal fugitive. The judge gave Kanahele credit for the three and a half months he spent in prison without bail. The judge also fined him $500 and ordered him to spend another four months under electronic monitoring at his Waimānalo home. In 2002, Governor Benjamin J. Cayetano granted Kanahele a full pardon.

In 2005, Kanehele spoke out against the proposed Native Hawaiian Government Reorganization Act (S.147, known as the Akaka Bill) pending in the Senate, and called upon Native Hawaiians to establish their own bank.

In 2006, Kanehele solicited over 53,000 votes in his bid for a seat in the Office of Hawaiian Affairs. As of 2007, Kanehele had transitioned to a less confrontational activism. Living out of the 45 acres of refuge in Waimānalo won in the Makapu'u Beach occupation resolution, he had been working as an alternative healer according to a 2007 'where are they now?' interview profile piece in Honolulu magazine. At the time, Pu'uhonua o Waimānalo had begun to live up to its name as a place of refuge for over 80 residents. Beginning in 2015, Kanahele is the face and advocate for a new cryptocurrency called Alohacoin. He declared this digital currency the official store of value for the Native Hawaiian People.

== In popular culture ==
Kanahele appeared as himself in the 2015 film Aloha.

Kanahele again played himself in Hawaii Five-0, in the 2017 episode entitled "Ka Laina Ma Ke One (Line in the Sand)".

== See also ==
- Legal status of Hawaii
