= Kekuni Blaisdell =

American physician

Richard Kekuni Akana Blaisdell (March 11, 1925 – February 12, 2016), was an American Hawaiian professor emeritus of medicine at the University of Hawaiʻi at Mānoa in Honolulu, and a longtime organizer in the Hawaiian Sovereignty Movement.

Blaisdell was the co-founder of an organization of Hawaiian health professionals called, E Ola Mau in 1984. He was also the Founding Chair, of the Department of Medicine at the University of Hawaiʻi John A. Burns School of Medicine in 1966. He was the convener for the 1993 Kanaka Maoli People's Tribunal, which documented U.S. abuses throughout all major islands in great detail before an international panel of judges, and the primary organizer of Ka Pākaukau (literally, "the Table"), an ongoing forum for dialogue surrounding Kānaka Maoli sovereignty and Hawaiian independence.

== Early life ==
Richard Kekuni Akana was born March 11, 1925, to Marguerite Nameleonalani Piltz and James Keli‘ikauahi Akana. His mother married William Kaha‘i Blaisdell in 1940.

A Graduate of the Kamehameha School for Boys in 1942, Blaisdell was awarded a BA cum laude from the University of Redlands in 1945 where he was also a Class Officer and on the Football Team. He then earned a MD from the University of Chicago School of Medicine in 1948. Through his educational career he was a classmate of former U.S. Senator Daniel K. Akaka at Kamehameha Schools and while in college was a classmate with Warren Christopher, who served as Secretary of State for President Clinton.

== Early medical career ==
After an Osler medical internship at the Johns Hopkins Hospital in Baltimore, Maryland, in 1949, he served as a medical resident on the Tulane Medical Service of Charity Hospital in New Orleans, Louisiana. In 1950-1954, he was in the US Army Medical Corps, as an investigator at the Climatic Research Laboratory in Lawrence, Massachusetts. He served as a battalion surgeon in Korea and a medical officer (Internist, US Army 343 Army Hosp) in Koizumi, Japan and Taiwan.

In 1954-1955, he became an instructor in pathology at Duke University Hospital in Durham, North Carolina. He then returned to the University of Chicago in 1955 to complete a fellowship in hematology (research on iron enzymes and preleukemia), and he was appointed to the faculty as instructor in 1957 and assistant professor of medicine in 1958.

In 1959, he was appointed Chief of Hematology and Research Associate at the Atomic Bomb Casualty Commission in Hiroshima and Nagasaki, Japan, where he did research on anemia, leukopenia, myelodysplasia in atomic bomb survivors, and adopted Mitsunori, a Japanese orphan.

He returned to the University of Chicago in 1961-1966 as an assistant professor of medicine. His research was on experimental splenic hemolytic anemia and myelodysplasia.

== Marriage and family ==
In 1962, Blaisdell married Irene Hiroko Saito, RN, in Chicago, IL. with adopted Mitsunori as ring boy. The couple's only daughter, Helen Kaleleonalani Blaisdell, was born in Chicago. Eventually, the family moved back to Hawaiʻi and settled in Nuʻuanu, Oʻahu.

== Medical career, 1965 to 1973 ==
In 1965, while in Chicago, Blaisdell received the national Lederle Medical Faculty Teaching Award, and thus became known to Dean Windsor Cutting, former Stanford Medical School dean and newly appointed first dean of the University of Hawaii School of Medicine.

In 1966, Blaisdell became the first Professor and Chair of the Department of Medicine at the newly established University of Hawaiʻi School of Medicine.1,2 He and his wife joined others in lobbying for a four-year medical school.

He continued platelet atherosclerosis research. During sabbatical years, Blaisdell was a visiting professor of medicine at Rutgers Medical School in 1969 and Harvard Medical School in 1979. He served as an East-West Center medical consultant in the Trust Territory of the Pacific, 1968–1970, and as a University of Hawaiʻi teaching consultant on Okinawa, 1967-1974.

== Death ==
Blaidell died at the age of 90 from respiratory failure in Queen's Medical Center on February 12, 2016.

== Awards ==
- 1973, Blaisdell was named Ha'awi 'Ike Akea Outstanding Professor at the University of Hawaii School of Medicine.1,2
- 1974 Blaidell was named Kamehameha Schools Alumnus of the year.2
- 1975, Blaisdell received the Kaiser Teaching Award of the University of Hawai'i School of Medicine.2
- 1970-1977, Blaisdell was appointed, along with served with Mary Kawena Puku'i, to the University of Hawai'i Committee for the Preservation of Hawaiian Language, Art and Culture; in 1972-1976, a member of the University of Hawai'i Native Hawaiian Students Committee, Program and Hawaiian Scholars Program. He served on the 1986-1988 University of Hawai'i System Ka'u (Hawaiian Studies) Task Force and, in 1987-1989, as acting interim director of the then-created University of Hawaiʻi Center for Hawaiian Studies.2
- 1970 Blaisdell served on the Hui Hanai (Queen Lili'uokalanai Children's Center Auxiliary) Board of Directors, as president, 1980-1982. He worked on the Nana I ke Kumu (Look to the Source) Book Committee, 1972–1979; and Queen's Songbook Committee, 1980-1990.2
- 1990 Living Treasure Award. The Living Treasures of Hawaiʻi program was created by the Buddhist temple Honpa Hongwanji Mission of Hawaii to honor residents of Hawaii. The criteria for selection are, "First, the designee must demonstrate continuous growth in his or her field; second, the potential Living Treasure must have made significant contributions toward a more humane and fraternal society (and this perhaps is the most important criteria); and finally, he or she must have shown an on-going striving for excellence and a high level of accomplishment." Honorees are nominated by members of the general public by August 1 of each year, and chosen by a committee designated by the temple.
- 1997. Asian and Pacific Island American Health Forum Lifetime Achievement Award in San Francisco
- 1998. Ahahui O na Kauka, charter member, board member.
- 2000. University of Chicago Alumni Community Service Award.
- 2001. Consultant, Native Hawaiian Center of Excellence, Dept of Native Hawaiian Health, University of Hawaii JABSOM.
- 2003. Prof Emeritus of Medicine, JABSOM.
- Recipient of the Republic of Palau Joint House and Senate Commendation Resolution and Pacific Basin Medical Association Recognition and Appreciation Award.
- 2007. Kekuni Blaisdell Endowment Lectureship was formed at the University of Hawaii by Osama Fukuyama, M.D.
- 2008. Awarded the Hawaiian Historical Society's Paa Moolelo Award in appreciation for "steadfast leadership and dedication to promoting and preserving the proud history of our islands."
- 2009. Awarded Honolulu Hawaiian Civic Club "I Ola Ka Lahui" Award.
- 2010 David Malo Award. Sponsored by the Rotary Club of West Honolulu. The award recognizes an individual of Hawaiian ancestry whose accomplishments and life have portrayed the idea of high achievement in such fields as art, music, dance, education, science, community service, government, religion, business or sport. The award is named after David Malo whose accomplishments and life exemplify the ideal of high achievement and community service for the betterment of the world around us.
- 2011 O'o Award April 7, 2011. The ‘Ō‘ō Award has become one of the most prestigious honors presented to outstanding Native Hawaiians who, through their talents, have made significant contributions to improve our communities and the well being of Native Hawaiians. The ‘ō‘ō itself is made from precious hardwoods firmly rooted in the ‘āina. Today, the tool is used as Native Hawaiian Chamber of Commerce’s symbol representing each honoree’s keen sense of firmly rooted values, business acumen, skill, and dedication to service – key ingredients for sustaining success in modern Hawai‘i, while maintaining ancient traditions and values.
- 2015 Kalani Ali'i Award September 12, 2015, Sponsored by: 'Aha Hipu'u: The Royal Order of Kamehameha I, The 'Ahahui Ka'ahumanu, The Hale O Na Ali'i O Hawai'i & The Daughters and Sons of Hawaiian Warriors - MAMAKAKAUA

== Kānaka Maoli Medicine, research and Hawaiian sovereignty movement ==
Kānaka Maoli. In the 1980s, Dr. Blaisdell discovered the term Kanaka Maoli, in Historical Text. He was the first to ask the questions: if one compares original historic descriptions of Hawaiians (robust health) with current statistics (ill health), what is it about western contact other than the obvious that explains near extinction of a race? More importantly, what can be done?

After this, he began to pioneer serious study of Kanaka Maoli Health Research as a medical field.

Na 'Oiwi O Hawaii. In 1984, Blaisdell helped to found Na 'Oiwi O Hawai'i with the goal of promoting Kanaka Maoli Independence. Na 'Oiwi O Hawai'i sponsored the first Native Hawaiian Sovereignty Conference at The Kamehameha Schools. As a major speaker, Blaisdell emphasized that the health of Kanaka Maoli is connected to the 'āina, and to preservation of cultural traditions and knowledge of one's own history and way of life. (This later became the basis for an M. Oneha dissertation, which Blaisdell nurtured and supported.)3,5

Nā Pu'uwai. In 1986, Blaisdell joined the board of Na Pu'uwai, a Native Hawaiian Health Care organization of the island of Moloka'i, with Emmett Aluli and Helen O'Connor. Na Pu'uwai became the Moloka'i-Lana'i Native Health Care System and conducted a study that demonstrated that the traditional Kanaka Maoli diet lowered blood cholesterol and triglyceride levels, thereby reducing risk for heart disease. (This later became the basis for the Waianae diet, popularized by T Shintani.) This study intensified interest in growing and eating traditional foods throughout the islands and invigorated the organization of health fairs in Kanaka Maoli communities to revitalize preparation and propagation of foods and other traditional medicines and healing practices. It was also one of the first studies on Kanaka Maoli health conducted largely by Kanaka Maoli themselves.3

Director, Center for Hawaiian Studies, University of Hawai'i at Manoa. Blaisdell served as Interim Director from 1987-1988. Blaisdell served on the Dissertation committees for nearly a dozen Native Hawaiian PhD candidates, including Lilikala Kame'eleihiwa and Kamana'opono Crabbe. He has helped numerous candidates write PhD papers, including Malcolm Chun.1,2,5

E Ola Mau and Papa Ola Lokahi. Blaisdell was a pioneer in advocating for accessible and culturally appropriate healthcare for Native Hawaiians. He provided dramatic documentation of worsening Kanaka Maoli health conditions.

After authoring the critical health report for the United States Congress Native Hawaiians Study Commission in 1983, he researched and wrote a compelling report identifying the health needs of Native Hawaiians entitled "E Ola Mau." The report was funded by the US Public Health Services and presented at the East-West Center in December 1985.

The following year, E Ola Mau became an organization of Native Hawaiian Health professionals formed to implement the recommendations of the report. Blaisdell was among members of E Ola Mau who testified for the Native Hawaiian Health Bill before the US Congress in 1986, 1987 and 1988. The bill was passed in October 1988 with final language provided by members of EOM to establish five Native Hawaiian Health Care Systems on five islands. The bill specified that traditional practices be integrated with services offering western health practices. The organization Papa Ola Lokahi (POL) was formed to provide coordination and oversight.

Sovereignty Movement. Blaisdell credits Puhipau Ahmad and Soli Niheu for inviting him to help start the Sovereignty Movement in the 1960s. Ahmad (Na Maka O Ka Aina) became the "eyes" of the movement, documenting evictions of Native Hawaiians from their homes at Sand Island and elsewhere. Niheu was the "heart" of the movement, participating in demonstrations, and Blaisdell became the "brains," researching and writing. It was Blaisdell who, with his own computer, copying machine, and checkbook, created the Native Hawaiian Tribunal, in which Blaisdell gathered an international panel of judges, flew the judges from island to island and asked Native Hawaiians on each island to testify as to how they had been affected by the overthrow of the monarchy, by annexation, and by statehood. Disposition of the tribunal documents are now under dispute. Blaisdell has specified to his attorney specifically where he would like them to reside.

== Other positions and awards ==
- 1987-1989 Wai'anae Coast Comprehensive Health Center Board of Directors.
- 1988-2006. Ke Ola Mamo, co-founder, board member. 1989. Hawai'i Medical Association (HMSA) Physician of the Year.
- 1989. Pro Kanaka Maoli Independence Working Group co-founder, convener. Ka Pakaukau, co-founder, convenor.
- 1990 Honpa Honwanji Living Treasure
- 1992-3. Convenor, Kanaka Maoli Tribunal Komike Covenor.
- 1994. Papa Ola Lokahi Ka'onohi Award .
- 1996. Petra Foundation Fellow in Washington, DC. http://petrafoundation.org/fellows/kekuni-blaisdell/index.html
- 1997. Asian and Pacific Island American Health Forum Lifetime Achievement Award in San Francisco
- 1998. Ahahui O na Kauka, charter member, board member.
- 2000. University of Chicago Alumni Community Service Award.
- 2001. Consultant, Native Hawaiian Center of Excellence, Deptartment of Native Hawaiian Health, University of Hawaiʻi JABSOM.
- 2003. Prof Emeritus of Medicine, JABSOM.
- Recipient of the Republic of Palau Joint House and Senate Commendation Resolution and Pacific Basin Medical Association Recognition and Appreciation Award.
- 2007. Kekuni Blaisdell Endowment Lectureship was formed at the University of Hawaii by Osamu Fukuyama, M.D.
- 2008. Awarded the Hawaiian Historical Society's Paa Moolelo Award in appreciation for "steadfast leadership and dedication to promoting and preserving the proud history of our islands."
- 2009. Awarded Honolulu Hawaiian Civic Club "I Ola Ka Lahui" Award.
- 2010. David Malo Award, West Honolulu Rotary Club
- 2011. O'O Award, Native Hawaiian Chamber of Commerce
