= Akaka Bill =

Proposed U.S. legislation on Native Hawaiians

The Native Hawaiian Government Reorganization Act of 2009 S1011/HR2314 was a bill before the 111th Congress. It is commonly known as the Akaka Bill after Senator Daniel Akaka of Hawaii, who proposed various forms of this bill after 2000.

The bill proposes to establish a process for US federal recognition of Native Hawaiians similar to an Indian tribe. However, the bill prohibits indigenous Native Hawaiians from gaming and other benefits available to federally recognized Indian tribes. The 2009 House version of the bill prohibited indigenous Native Hawaiians from pursuing their claims in the courts and arguably legitimizes past transfers of Hawaiian land that would not have been legitimate for Indian Tribes. The most updated Senate version however allows Native Hawaiians to pursue claims in court. On December 16, 2009, a Congressional House Committee passed an unamended version of the Akaka Bill. On the following day, the Senate Indian Affairs Committee approved the amendments in S. 1011, the Senate version of the Native Hawaiian Government Reorganization Act. As of January 10, 2009, H.R. 2314 was not completely consistent with S. 1011.

Akaka said on the floor of the U.S. Senate in December 2010 that "misleading attacks" and "unprecedented obstruction" led to the failure of legislation in the 111th Congress.

== Purpose ==
The stated purpose of the Akaka Bill is "to provide a process for the reorganization of the single Native Hawaiian governing entity and the reaffirmation of the special political and legal relationship between the United States and that Native Hawaiian governing entity for purposes of continuing a government-to-government relationship".

The government that the Akaka Bill intends to reorganize is identified as the Kingdom of Hawaii in the first paragraphs of Indian Affairs Committee Report 108–85.

== Proposed provisions ==
The recognition proposed in the Akaka bill is somewhat similar to the recognition that federally recognized Tribes in the continental 49 states have. However, unlike those groups, the current version of the Akaka Bill prohibits Hawaiians from establishing casinos under current laws without banning the establishment of casinos under future negotiations (Section 9a), from participation in programs and services enjoyed by Indians (Section 9f), from being included on the Secretary of the Interior's list of Tribes eligible for federal benefits because of their status as Indians ("Public Law 103-454, 25 U.S.C. 479a, shall not apply."), and from pursuing claims against the United States for past wrongs in court. Also, unlike recognized Tribes in the continental 48 states and Alaska, the Akaka Bill does not require any of the same requirements for tribal recognition. The Bureau of Indian Affairs requires the satisfaction of 7 criteria before recognizing a tribe, none of which are present in the Akaka Bill. They are:

- 83.7a: The petitioner has been identified as an American Indian entity on a substantially continuous basis since 1900.
- 83.7b: A predominant portion of the petitioning group comprises a distinct community and has existed as a community from historical times to the present.
- 83.7c: The petitioner has maintained political influence or authority over its members as an autonomous entity from historical times until the present.
- 83.7d: A copy of the group's present governing documents including its membership criteria.
- 83.7e: The petitioner's membership consists of individuals who descend from a historical Indian tribe or from historical Indian tribes which combined and functioned as a single autonomous political entity.
- 83.7f: The membership of the petitioning group is composed primarily of persons who are not members of an acknowledged North American Indian tribe.
- 83.7g: Neither the petitioner nor its members are the subject of congressional legislation that has expressly terminated or forbidden the federal relationship.

The current version of the bill provides for negotiations between the United States and the proposed new Hawaiian government. The bill provides for the new Hawaiian government to negotiate for land, rights, and resources, however, the bill does not indicate what the Federal government will be negotiating for, that is what it is Hawaiians have that the Federal government will expect in return at the negotiating table. Typically however, in Tribal–U.S. negotiations, Indians give up their legal and other grievances against the United States in exchange for a portion of disputed land, rights, and resources. (See United States Code Title 25 Chapter 19 for examples.)

Section 2 of findings is based primarily upon the Apology Resolution of 1993.

Section 3 defines "Native Hawaiian" as:

(i) an individual who is 1 of the indigenous, native people of Hawaii and who is a direct lineal descendant of the aboriginal, indigenous, native people who—

(I) resided in the islands that now comprise the State of Hawaii on or before January 1, 1893; and
(II) occupied and exercised sovereignty in the Hawaiian archipelago, including the area that now constitutes the State of Hawaii; or

(ii) an individual who is 1 of the indigenous, native people of Hawaii and who was eligible in 1921 for the programs authorized by the Hawaiian Homes Commission Act (42 Stat. 108, chapter 42) or a direct lineal descendant of that individual.

Section 5 establishes the "United States Office for Native Hawaiian Relations". In a revision to a previous version of the Akaka Bill, S.147, the new S.310 no longer requires consultation with the Governor of the State of Hawaii explicitly, but only the "State of Hawaii".

Section 6 establishes the "Native Hawaiian Interagency Coordinating Group" for coordination of various federal agencies and policies, with the specific exclusion of the Department of Defense.

Section 7 establishes a commission of 9 members to certify which adults meet the definition of “Native Hawaiian" established in Section 3(10), and to prepare and maintain a roll of adult "Native Hawaiians" by that definition. Originally requiring specific ancestry to be a member of the commission in S.147, S.310 only requires "(i) not less than 10 years of experience in the study and determination of Native Hawaiian genealogy; and (ii) an ability to read and translate into English documents written in the Hawaiian language." The bill cites the overthrow of the Kingdom of Hawaii, which was multi-racial from its inception, but it does not provide any opportunity for non-Native Hawaiians as defined by the law to participate in the new governing entity.

Once a roll is established, those on the roll will establish a "Native Hawaiian Interim Governing Council", who would establish a permanent form of government. The bill provides that governing documents may, but do not have to be approved by a majority of the people on the roll, and that the form of government chosen "provide for the protection of the civil rights of the citizens of the Native Hawaiian governing entity and all persons affected by the exercise of governmental powers and authorities by the Native Hawaiian governing entity", but does not enumerate if equal protection on the basis of race is one of those civil rights.

Section 8 defers any settlement of issues such as the transfer of lands, the exercise of governmental authority, civil and criminal jurisdiction, and "grievances regarding assertions of historical wrongs committed against Native Hawaiians by the United States or by the State of Hawaii" to future negotiations between the newly organized Native Hawaiian Government and the United States and the State of Hawaii. It also provides: ”Nothing in this Act is intended to create or allow to be maintained in any court any potential breach-of-trust actions, land claims, resource-protection or resource-management claims, or similar types of claims brought by or on behalf of Native Hawaiians or the Native Hawaiian governing entity for equitable, monetary, or Administrative Procedure Act-based relief against the United States or the State of Hawaii, whether or not such claims specifically assert an alleged breach of trust, call for an accounting, seek declaratory relief, or seek the recovery of or compensation for lands once held by Native Hawaiians. Also Provides: "Nor shall any preexisting waiver of sovereign immunity (including, but not limited to, waivers set forth in chapter 7 of part I of title 5, United States Code, and sections 1505 and 2409a of title 28, United States Code) be applicable to any such claims. This complete retention or reclaiming of sovereign immunity also applies to every claim that might attempt to rely on this Act for support, without regard to the source of law under which any such claim might be asserted." And Also: "It is the general effect of section 8(c)(2)(B) that any claims that may already have accrued and might be brought against the United States, including any claims of the types specifically referred to in section 8(c)(2)(A), along with both claims of a similar nature and claims arising out of the same nucleus of operative facts as could give rise to claims of the specific types referred to in section 8(c)(2)(A), be rendered nonjusticiable in suits brought by plaintiffs other than the Federal Government."

Section 9 Provides: "Native Hawaiians may not conduct gaming activities" and; "the Secretary (of the Interior of the United States) shall not take land into trust on behalf of individuals or groups claiming to be Native Hawaiian, and; "(c) Real Property Transfers – The Indian Trade and Intercourse Act (25 U.S.C. 177), does not, has never, and will not apply after enactment to lands or lands transfers present, past, or future, in the State of Hawaii. If despite the expression of this intent herein, a court were to construe the Trade and Intercourse Act to apply to lands or land transfers in Hawaii before the date of enactment of this Act, then any transfer of land or natural resources located within the State of Hawaii prior to the date of enactment of this Act, by or on behalf of the Native Hawaiian people, or individual Native Hawaiians, shall be deemed to have been made in accordance with the Indian Trade and Intercourse Act and any other provision of Federal law that specifically applies to transfers of land or natural resources from, by, or on behalf of an Indian tribe, Native Hawaiians, or Native Hawaiian entities." and; "nothing in this Act provides an authorization for eligibility to participate in any Indian program."

== Support ==
Although the bill has changed substantially since some of these groups announced their support, supporters of the bill have included:

1. Former President Barack Obama
2. Hawaiʻi's Democratic congressional delegation Senators Daniel Akaka and Daniel K. Inouye and Representative Mazie Hirono.
3. Hawaiʻi's Democratic State Governor and former congressional Representative Neil Abercrombie.
4. Hawaiʻi's State legislature, which has unanimously passed at least three resolutions supporting federal recognition for Native Hawaiians.
5. The National Congress of American Indians, the oldest and largest national Native American organization.
6. The Alaska Federation of Natives, the largest organization representing the Native people of Alaska.
7. The National Indian Education Association.
8. The American Bar Association.
9. The Japanese American Citizens League.
10. Those who seek legislation to provide federal recognition for Native Hawaiians to ensure that the native (especially at-risk) population continues to receive services in health care, housing, education, job training, employment, culture, and the arts.
11. The United States Commission on Civil Rights. The Commission previously opposed federal recognition in 2006, but reversed its position in 2018.

Supporters of the bill seek to protect the programs assisting Native Hawaiians, such as the Office of Hawaiian Affairs and the Kamehameha Schools, as well as health-care and housing for the Hawaiian population. Senator Akaka said, as he introduced the 2007 version on the Congressional floor:

The legislation I introduce today seeks to build upon the foundation of reconciliation. It provides a structured process to bring together the people of Hawaiʻi, along a path of healing to a Hawaiʻi where its indigenous people are respected and culture is embraced. Through enactment of this legislation, we have the opportunity to demonstrate that our country does not just preach its ideas, but lives according to its founding principles. As it has for America's other indigenous peoples, I believe the United States must fulfill its responsibility to Native Hawaiians.

In a 2005 editorial in The Washington Times, the Republican Attorney General of Hawaii Mark J. Bennett vigorously defended the Akaka Bill against claims that it would create a race-based government, by explaining that the bill simply respects the “special status of native peoples recognized consistently for decades by the U.S. Supreme Court.” He argued that “Hawaiians are not asking for 'special' treatment — they’re simply asking to be treated the same way … other native indigenous Americans are treated in this country.”

In addition, supporters of the bill – including other Congressional delegates, Governor Linda Lingle, Hawaiʻi Attorney General Bennett, Native American groups, and Asian American groups – argued that rejecting the bill would be racially discriminatory. Supporters also argue that the State legislature, which has unanimously supported the bill, is bi-partisan, multiracial, and multicultural and, as Hawaiʻi residents, closely understand the needs of the Native Hawaiian community. In support of the bill, Senator Inouye responded that failing to pass the bill would discriminate against the Native Hawaiians, for Congress had already provided federal recognition of the other indigenous and aboriginal peoples of America. He also argued that the Rice v. Cayetano case cited by opponents was irrelevant to the Akaka Bill, reminding Congress that Chief Justice John Roberts himself had written the State brief and had argued that Native Hawaiians were aboriginal and indigenous people and could be recognized as such by Congress. Senator Akaka had also asserted in his introduction of the bill:

This measure does not result in race discrimination. But discrimination will occur if this measure is not passed. It is undisputed that Native Hawaiians are the aboriginal, indigenous people of Hawaii. Yet some of my colleagues want to discriminate against them and treat them differently from other Native Americans – the American Indian and the Alaska Native.

In response to opponents citing Congressional requirements for Native Americans and arguing that Native Hawaiians do not meet such requirements, Governor Lingle and Hawaiʻi Attorney General Bennett responded that the bill did not authorize Native Hawaiian participation in American Indian programs, that Native Americans and Alaska Natives support the bill, that to suggest otherwise resulted in placing native groups against each other, that barring Native Hawaiians from programs that provided to other natives was offensive. In addition, they also wrote:

The arguments against recognition for Native Hawaiians because Hawaiians cannot satisfy the requirements Congress set out for the recognition of Native Americans (in the Indian Reorganization Act of 1934) are simply not relevant because Congress has not and need not include those conditions in S. 147. Native Hawaiians have always had to rely on a separate bill for recognition because the Indian Reorganization Act of 1934 was never intended to be the means of providing recognition for Native Hawaiians – it literally only applies to the native people of the "continental United States." See 25 U.S.C. § 473; 25 C.F.R. § 83.3....

Rather than crack the "melting pot" that is Hawaii (an outcome opponents of S. 147 purport to fear), passage of S. 147 will finally give official and long overdue recognition to the losses Hawaiians have suffered – the blurring, if not diminution, of Hawaiians’ native identity; the erosion of their confidence as a people; the destruction of any semblance of self-determination and self-governance; and, as the United States Supreme Court put it, the loss of a "culture and way of life." Finally, Native Hawaiians will have restored to them what they lost more than a hundred years ago – status as a people and recognition of their roots.

In a 2005 interview, Senator Akaka said that the bill, "creates a government-to-government relationship with the United States” as it provides a legal parity similar to that of native tribal governments in the contiguous states and Alaska. When the reporter commented that the bill could potentially lead to independence, Senator Akaka replied "that could be" but that it would be up to future generations to decide. Some who oppose the bill cite this statement as indicative of its potential support of secession of a Native Hawaiian government from the United States. However, the 2007 version of the bill has specified that secession is not a provision of the bill.

In 2018, the United States Commission on Civil Rights released a report evaluating the federal government's efforts to meet its trust obligations to Native Americans and Native Hawaiians. Regarding Native Hawaiian sovereignty, it found:

The federal government does not have an official government-to-government relationship with the Native Hawaiian community. However, Congress has acknowledged the role of the United States in the overthrow of the Kingdom of Hawaii and the annexation of Hawaii without the consent or compensation of Native Hawaiians. Congress has passed over 150 laws that promote the welfare of Native Hawaiians and establish a special political and legal relationship with the Native Hawaiian community similar to the trust relationship between the United States and Native Americans. In 2016, the federal government finalized an administrative rule that allows a unified Native Hawaiian government (if established) to enter into a formal government-to-government relationship with the U.S. government.

In reversing its earlier 2006 position, the Commission recommended:

Congress can acknowledge a government-to-government relationship with Native Hawaiians to confirm its intent to provide Native Hawaiians at least all the same federal benefits that Native Americans have. Congress should pass legislation to provide a process for the reorganization of a Native Hawaiian governing entity and to confirm the special political and legal relationship between the United States and such Native Hawaiian governing entity.

== Opposition ==
Opposition to the Akaka Bill includes:

1. Those who believe that the bill is unconstitutionally race-based;
2. Those who believe the "tribe" created via the Akaka Bill would shield corrupt trustees from prosecution;
3. Those who believe that a school voucher system would allow Kamehameha Schools to serve all interested Hawaiian students and also admit non-Hawaiians thus eliminating the race-discrimination basis of the lawsuits;
4. Those who believe that it could begin the process of secession of a single racial group from the United States;
5. Those who believe the United States never legally annexed the Hawaiian Kingdom and that it has no jurisdiction over the territory and populace of the country;
6. Those who believe that it could thwart the process of secession of Hawaii from the United States and the restoration of an independent Hawaiian nation controlled by native Hawaiians (native Hawaiian sovereignty activists);
7. Hawaiʻi's Attorney General Mark Bennett.
8. The George W. Bush Administration, which issued a letter arguing against the earlier version of the bill;
9. Aloha 4 All, a Hawaii-based civil rights group;
10. The Grassroot Institute of Hawaii, a Hawaii-based think-tank
11. US Representatives who wrote a letter to the Speaker of the House and Majority Leader asking them to kill the Akaka Bill. The letter entailed three reasons for killing the bill: (1) The Constitution does not allow for a separate, sovereign, race-based government; (2) Practical issues have not been addressed such as how businesses could fairly compete with each other if one must for example pay state taxes and another must not; (3) Historical commitments do not support such a bill. For example, when Hawaii became a state there was broad congressional consensus and assurances given by the State of Hawaii that Native Hawaiians would not seek to be treated as a separate racial group and transformed into an "Indian tribe".

Native Hawaiian sovereignty activists who oppose the bill believe that it blocks their attempts to establish their independence from the federal government and disregards 1993 Public Law (103-150), in which Congress apologized "for the overthrow and the deprivation of the rights of Native Hawaiians to self-determination." Washington-based constitutional scholar Bruce Fein has outlined a number of counter-arguments disputing the accuracy of the assertions made in the Apology Resolution, stating "The apology wrongly insinuates that the overthrown 1893 government was for Native Hawaiians alone".

In 2006, the United States Commission on Civil Rights held hearings on the Akaka bill, and published a report that recommended against it. The report did not contain any official findings and its only recommendation stated in part:

The Commission recommends against passage of the Native Hawaiian Government Reorganization Act of 2005 (S. 147) as reported out of committee on May 16, 2005, or any other legislation that would discriminate on the basis of race or national origin and further subdivide the American people into discrete subgroups accorded varying degrees of privilege.

The Commission later reversed its position in 2018.

Some opponents believe that programs maintained exclusively for Native Hawaiians, such as the Office of Hawaiian Affairs and the Kamehameha Schools, are race-based and discriminatory and see the Akaka bill as an attempt to subvert the February 23, 2000 U.S. Supreme Court decision in Rice v. Cayetano, which ruled that limiting participation in OHA elections to Native Hawaiians was an unconstitutional restriction on the basis of race.

A Grassroot Institute poll found the majority of Hawaiʻi residents responding to the poll opposed the Akaka Bill.

Some opponents are also skeptical of the bill's language disallowing casinos or other gaming in Hawaiʻi, since although it denies the newly created government "inherent" authority to conduct gaming, it leaves that issue open to future negotiation.

In May 2006, Senator Akaka began a run of fifteen daily speeches on the issue to gain support for a cloture vote on the bill, after the Commission on Civil Rights report recommended against the bill. Opponents of the Akaka bill have responded to his daily speeches, as well as to the arguments in favor made by other politicians.

Regarding the latest version of the bill, S.310, Akaka's website states, "This language has been publicly available since September 2005 and has been widely distributed." However, opponents note, S.147, which failed to get enough votes for cloture on June 8, 2006, did not include the revisions now present in S.310.

In 2007, at a hearing before the Senate Committee on Indian Affairs, Principal Deputy Associate Attorney General Gregory Katsas stated:

By dividing government power along racial and ancestral lines, S. 310 (the bill) would represent a significant step backwards in American history and would create far greater problems than those it might purport to solve

FreeHawaii.info is a site that documents many of the misgivings of this bill, the history of changes, and a few voices of the many opponents.

== Previous versions ==
The Akaka Bill was previously introduced, in different forms, on the following occasions:

- From the 106th Congress:
  - S. 2899 (July 20, 2000)
  - H.R. 4904 (July 20, 2000)
- 107th Congress:
  - S. 81 (January 22, 2001)
  - H.R. 617 (February 14, 2001)
  - S. 746 (April 6, 2001)
  - S. 1783 (December 7, 2001)
- 108th Congress:
  - S. 344 (February 11, 2003)
  - H.R. 665 (February 11, 2003)
  - H.R. 4282 (May 5, 2004)
- 109th Congress:
  - S. 147 (January 25, 2005)
  - H.R. 309 (January 25, 2005)
  - S. 3064 (May 25, 2006)
- 110th Congress:
  - S. 310 (January 17, 2007)
  - H.R. 505 (January 17, 2007)

== See also ==
- Hawaiian sovereignty movement
- Legal status of Hawaii
- Larsen v. Hawaiian Kingdom
