= Aloha (2015 film) =

American romantic comedy film by Cameron Crowe

- Theatrical release poster
- Directed by: Cameron Crowe
- Written by: Cameron Crowe
- Produced by: Scott Rudin; Cameron Crowe
- Starring: Bradley Cooper; Emma Stone; Rachel McAdams; Bill Murray; John Krasinski; Danny McBride; Alec Baldwin
- Cinematography: Eric Gautier
- Edited by: Joe Hutshing
- Music by: Jónsi & Alex
- Production companies: Columbia Pictures; Regency Enterprises; Scott Rudin Productions; Vinyl Films
- Distributed by: Sony Pictures Releasing (United States and Canada); 20th Century Fox (International)
- Release dates: May 27, 2015 (Hollywood); May 29, 2015 (United States)
- Running time: 105 minutes
- Country: United States
- Language: English
- Budget: $37–52 million
- Box office: $26.3 million

Aloha is a 2015 American romantic comedy film written, co-produced and directed by Cameron Crowe. It stars Bradley Cooper as former U.S. Air Force officer Brian Gilcrest, who returns to Hawaii after being rehired by a former boss to oversee the launch of a privatized weapons satellite in the skies over Hawaii. Emma Stone, Rachel McAdams, Bill Murray, John Krasinski, Danny McBride, and Alec Baldwin star in supporting roles. As of 2026, it is the latest film directed by Crowe.

Released on May 29, 2015, by Sony Pictures Releasing in the United States and Canada and by 20th Century Fox in international markets, the film was a critical and commercial failure, grossing $26.3 million worldwide against a budget of $37–52 million.

== Plot ==
Military contractor Brian Gilcrest returns to Hawaii with billionaire Carson Welch, who intends to develop local land into a space center from which he will launch a privately-funded satellite. Once a celebrated Air Force officer whose career ended controversially amid shadowy dealings in Afghanistan, the now-disillusioned Gilcrest is tasked with negotiating with Native Hawaiian leaders for the project. His assignment reunites him with his ex-girlfriend Tracy, now married with two children, and introduces him to his Air Force liaison, Captain Allison Ng, whose idealistic optimism rekindles his childhood interest in space.

Assisted by Ng, who is of one-quarter Hawaiian background, Gilcrest secures support from community leader King Dennis “Bumpy” Kanahele, who agrees to participate in a blessing ceremony that will allow Welch to build his center in return for the king obtaining control over the territory of two whole mountains and free cell phone service for the area. The following night, during dinner at Tracy's house, Gilcrest meets her husband John Woodside (nicknamed "Woody") and children, Grace and Mitchell. Later, alone in the kitchen, Tracy confesses she once imagined a future with Gilcrest before he abandoned her 13 years earlier.

The next evening, at Welch's Christmas party, General Dixon, the commander of Pacific Air Forces, warns Gilcrest against jeopardizing their deal, and one of Dixon's subordinates hands Gilcrest a thumb drive containing top-secret information for the upcoming satellite launch. During the party, Gilcrest becomes attracted to Ng, who joins him in his hotel room afterwards for the night, where he recounts his near-death experiences in Kabul. The next day, Ng discovers that the satellite will actually carry a secret nuclear payload. When she tries to resign, she is told that it is a private operation run by Welch and that Gilcrest has already been informed of the details. She later tearfully confronts Gilcrest for deceiving her and the Hawaiians.

Woody and Tracy confront each other about recent marital tensions, which he believes started as soon as Gilcrest arrived, and both agree to separate. The next morning, she arrives at the hotel and reveals to Gilcrest that Grace is his biological daughter, although Woody remains devoted to their family. Later that day, after the successful blessing of the new pedestrian gate, Gilcrest learns that Chinese hackers are attempting to sabotage the impending launch by tampering with the satellite's code.

Rushing to the command center, Gilcrest thwarts the cyberattack, but as he watches the satellite enter geosynchronous orbit, he realizes his complicity has threatened the ideals of Ng, whom he has come to love. He quickly and impulsively orders a massive sonic upload to be sent to space, thus overriding the system, and both watch the satellite explode. Accepting that Ng’s promising career could be harmed by their continued association, he ends their relationship.

Furious that his satellite has been destroyed, Welch confronts Gilcrest, who reminds him that the sky is meant to be shared by all, while Dixon, also incensed by Gilcrest's actions, threatens to prosecute him. When Gilcrest returns to Tracy's residence, she reads him an emotional love letter from Woody. Gilcrest encourages Tracy to stay with Woody, and she likewise encourages him to romantically pursue Ng. Upon arriving home, Woody notices Gilcrest and, realizing Gilcrest is Grace's father, asks him if he slept with Tracy to rekindle their romance while he was away; Gilcrest clarifies that he is actually in love with Ng. While cleaning up the living room, Tracy notices Woody and they reconcile in an emotional embrace, joined by their children.

Dixon later realizes that Gilcrest was indeed honest about the satellite's nuclear payload and belatedly praises his actions, promising him that Welch will be prosecuted. Outside the hotel, Gilcrest encounters Ng, who is preparing to depart, and confesses his love to her, vowing to await her return to Hawaii. That night, he quietly watches Grace perform in her hula class and silently nods at her. Finally accepting him as her biological father, Grace dashes outside and tearfully embraces him before returning to her class as he smiles, finally at peace.

== Cast ==
- Bradley Cooper as Brian Gilcrest, a military contractor
- Emma Stone as Captain Allison Ng, an Air Force pilot
- Rachel McAdams as Tracy Woodside, Brian's ex-girlfriend
- Bill Murray as Carson Welch, a billionaire entrepreneur
- John Krasinski as Major John "Woody" Woodside, Tracy's husband and an Air Force pilot
- Danny McBride as Colonel "Fingers" Lacy
- Alec Baldwin as General Dixon, Commander of Pacific Air Forces (PACAF)
- Bill Camp as Bob Largent
- Michael Chernus as Roy
- Danielle Rose Russell as Grace Woodside, Tracy's daughter
- Jaeden Martell as Mitchell Woodside, Tracy's son
- Edi Gathegi as Lieutenant Colonel Curtis
- Ivana Miličević as Carson's biographer
- Bumpy Kanahele as himself
- Fahim Fazli as Afghan tribesman
- Robert P "Rob" Moore as aviation advisor and pilot

== Production ==
Emma Stone was first to be cast in the film in 2012.

On July 31, 2013, Alec Baldwin joined the cast of the film. There was a casting call for extras on August 29 on Oahu. Bradley Cooper went to Hawaii on September 14, twelve days before filming began on September 26, 2013.

On October 7, it was announced that principal photography was still underway in Hawaii. Stone received ground training on how to fly the Piper PA44-180 Seminole airplane from Rob Moore, Chief Instructor Pilot of Galvin Flight Services Hawaii, who later flew the airplane near Kaʻaʻawa Valley for the inflight shots. Moore acted as the aviation technical advisor. Cooper was filming in downtown Honolulu on December 18 and 19, 2013. On February 2, 2015, Sony Pictures stated that the film's final title would be Aloha; the previous working titles were Deep Tiki and Volcano Romance.

== Music ==
The musical score for Aloha was composed by Jónsi & Alex, following Jónsi's collaboration with Cameron Crowe on We Bought a Zoo (2011). Mark Mothersbaugh said in May 2014 that originally he was going to score the film. On May 26, 2015, Madison Gate Records and Sony Legacy released a soundtrack album, which included tracks by Vancouver Sleep Clinic, Fleetwood Mac, David Crosby, Jonsi & Alex, Beck and Josh Ritter.

== Release ==
On February 14, 2014, it was announced that the film was scheduled for release on December 25, 2014. On July 21, the release date was changed to May 29, 2015.

The film's first trailer was released on February 11, 2015.

=== Box office ===
Aloha grossed $21.1 million in North America and $5.2 million in other territories for a total gross of $26.3 million, against a $37 million budget.

In North America, Aloha opened simultaneously with the disaster film San Andreas. It earned $500,000 from Thursday night showings at 2,275 theaters and an estimated $3.5 million on its opening day from 2,815 theaters. In its opening weekend, the film grossed $9.7 million, finishing 6th at the box office. The film earned $1.65 million in its opening weekend overseas from 7 countries. Australia and New Zealand had an opening weekend combined of $1.5 million and Brazil opened with $240,000. The film went directly to video on demand in the UK and France.

Pamela McClintock at The Hollywood Reporter estimated that the financial losses by the film finished to around $65 million by the time the film ended its global theatrical run, based on a budget of "$37 million-plus".

=== Critical response ===
On Rotten Tomatoes, the film has an approval rating of 20% based on reviews from 165 critics, with an average rating of 4.40/10. The critics' consensus reads: "Meandering and insubstantial, Aloha finds writer-director Cameron Crowe at his most sentimental and least compelling." On Metacritic, the film has a weighted average score of 40 out of 100 based on 36 critics, indicating "mixed or average" reviews. In CinemaScore polls conducted during the opening weekend, surveyed audiences gave Aloha an average grade of "B−" on an A+ to F scale.

Peter Travers of Rolling Stone wrote: "It gives me no pleasure to report that Aloha is still a mess, a handful of stories struggling for a unifying tone." Andrew Barker of Variety called it Crowe's worst film, saying it was "unbalanced, unwieldy, and at times nearly unintelligible".

Richard Roeper of the Chicago Sun-Times recommended the film despite its flaws, "There ARE times when Aloha doesn't work — and yet I'm recommending it for its sometimes loony sense of wonder, its trippy spirituality, its brilliant cast and because I seem to be a sap for even the Cameron Crowe movies almost nobody else likes."

== Accolades ==
The film was nominated for three Teen Choice Awards: Bradley Cooper for Choice Movie Actor: Comedy; Emma Stone for Choice Movie Actress: Comedy; and the film itself in the category of Choice Movie: Comedy.

== Whitewashing controversy ==
The Media Action Network for Asian Americans accused the director and studio of whitewashing the cast, and Crowe apologized about Emma Stone being cast as a character who is stated to be of one-quarter Chinese and one-quarter Hawaiian descent.

In June 2015, Crowe responded to the backlash: "I have heard your words and your disappointment, and I offer you a heart-felt apology to all who felt this was an odd or misguided casting choice. As far back as 2007, Captain Allison Ng was written to be a super-proud one-quarter Hawaiian who was frustrated that, by all outward appearances, she looked nothing like one. A half-Chinese father was meant to show the surprising mix of cultures often prevalent in Hawaii. Extremely proud of her unlikely heritage, she feels personally compelled to over-explain every chance she gets. The character was based on a real-life, red-headed local who did just that."

Sony Pictures defended the film's portrayal of Hawaiian culture stating, "While some have been quick to judge a movie they haven't seen and a script they haven't read, the film Aloha respectfully showcases the spirit and culture of the Hawaiian people."

Stone later said she regretted letting herself be inaccurately ethnically cast and acknowledged whitewashing as a widespread problem in Hollywood. Nevertheless, she echoed Crowe's defense of her casting: "The character was not supposed to look like her background which was a quarter Hawaiian and a quarter Chinese."

During the opening monologue for the 2019 Golden Globe Awards, co-host Sandra Oh alluded to the issue of whitewashing in Hollywood by joking that Crazy Rich Asians (2018) was "the first studio film with an Asian-American lead since Ghost in the Shell and Aloha." This prompted Stone, who was in attendance, to shout "I'm sorry!" in reaction.
