= Legal status of Hawaii =

The legal status of Hawaii is an evolving legal matter as it pertains to United States law. The US Federal law was amended in 1993 with the Apology Resolution which "acknowledges that the overthrow of the Kingdom of Hawaii occurred with the active participation of agents and citizens of the United States and further acknowledges that the Native Hawaiian people never directly relinquished to the United States their claims to their inherent sovereignty as a people over their national lands."

Hawaii is internationally recognized as a state of the United States of America. The legality of control of Hawaii by the United States has also been raised on the losing side in cases in the United States Supreme Court, and in U.S. District Court. Recent legal action includes the dismissal of Hawaiian Kingdom v. Biden on December 14, 2022. The Permanent Court of Arbitration has, in one of its rulings, regarded the Hawaiian Kingdom as a state and not a private entity, in a case where a Hawaiian resident made a claim against the state for allowing the imposition of American municipal laws above Hawaiian laws.

== Background ==
The islands known today as Hawaii were settled by Polynesian explorers some time around 1150-1250 AD. The inhabitants are referred to as kānaka maoli. After 1778, and the arrival of James Cook, population levels plummeted and eventually the islands would be unified in 1795 under the leadership of Kamehameha I. Within one hundred years of the founding of the kingdom, American political and religious influence would erode the powers of the Polynesian monarchs and eventually overthrow the kingdom on January 17, 1893.

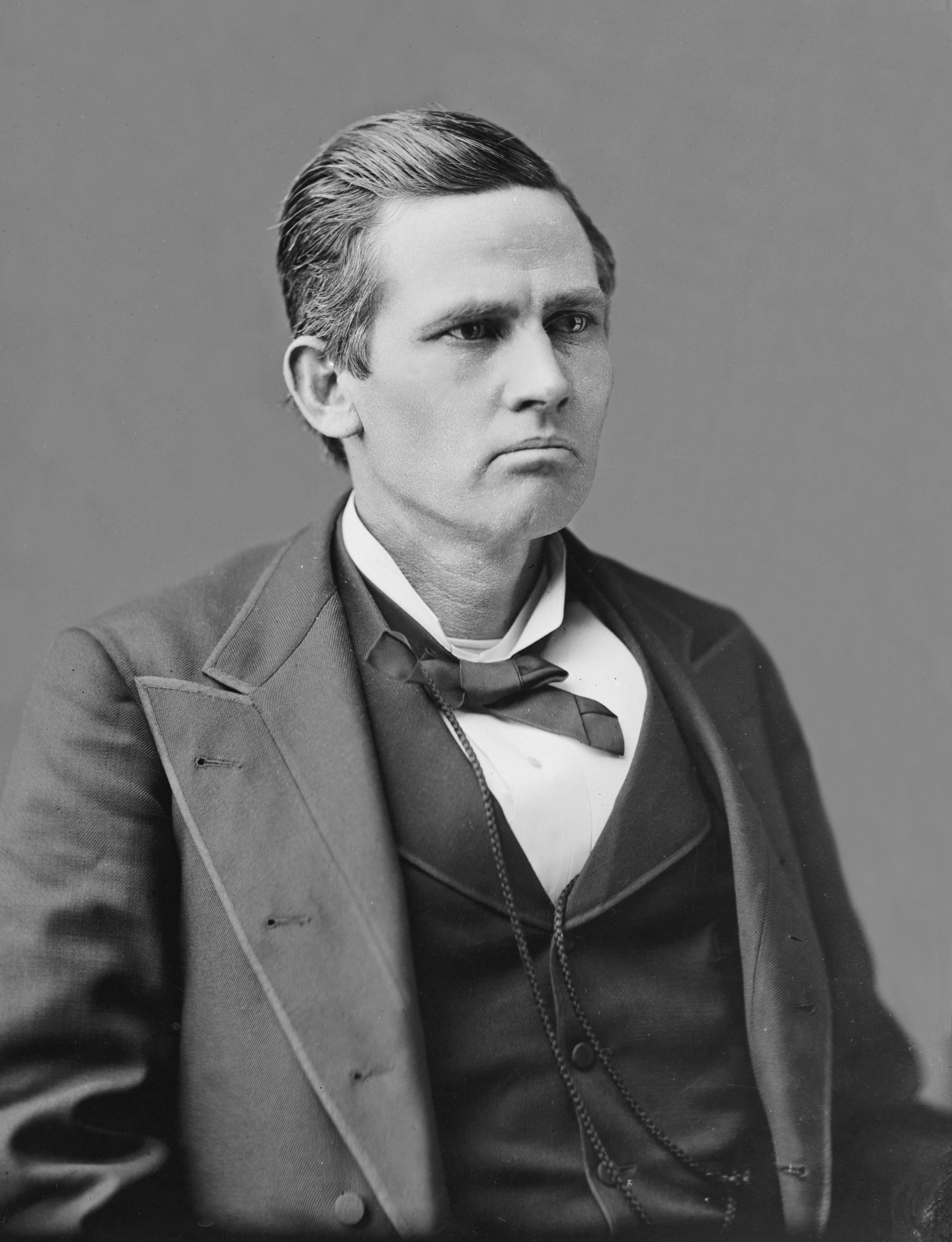
James Blount

=== 1893 U.S. presidential (Blount) investigation ===
A provisional government was established which favored annexation. U.S. President Grover Cleveland rejected the provisional government for the illegal overthrow of a sovereign nation and demanded the restoration of Queen Liliʻuokalani to her rightful place as ruler of the Kingdom of Hawaii. The new government refused and the Republic of Hawaii was declared instead. Cleveland sent Georgia Congressman James Henderson Blount to investigate the matter. Following his investigation, Blount issued a 1342-page report on July 17, 1893, which called the coup an "act of war" against a friendly and independent nation, and recommended that appropriate measures be taken by the U.S. to restore the Hawaiian Kingdom. The Cleveland Administration, and particularly Secretary of State Gresham, recommended the fair yet forcible removal of the usurpers from power. They were advised, however, that this would require a Declaration of War. It was doubtful that Congress would pass such a measure against its own citizens.

Grover Cleveland, who argued against the overthrow of Hawaii.

=== Cleveland's attempts at restoration ===
Cleveland nonetheless advocated for intervention. Meanwhile, the new Minister to Hawaii, Alfred Willis, asked the Queen if she would pardon the usurpers if restored. The Queen stated that she was legally bound to follow the 1887 Constitution (ironically, forced on her brother Kalākaua by many of the same usurpers in question), which required either banishment or death as a punishment for treason. Willis reported to president Cleveland that she had told him that the conspirators should be "beheaded". The press quickly inflamed the situation, reporting that the Queen intended to decapitate every non-native person in Hawaii. The reaction among citizens in both Honolulu and Washington was riotous, and Cleveland was forced to abandon his course of action, handing the matter over to Congress, which, tiring of the conflict and lacking the means to restore the Queen without risking a fiasco, recognized the Republic.

Cleveland ended his support for the Queen. His own political position was increasingly shaky. His strong stances for the gold standard, for the upholding of treaties with Native Americans (which, in one case, returned four million acres to the Winnebago and Crow Creek peoples, angering tens of thousands of American settlers who had gathered in readiness to occupy them) and against imperialism and involvement in Nicaragua, along with a multitude of personal controversies and finally, his disastrous attempt at intervention in the Pullman Strike left him totally unable to engage in contentious action, particularly once the situation became volatile.

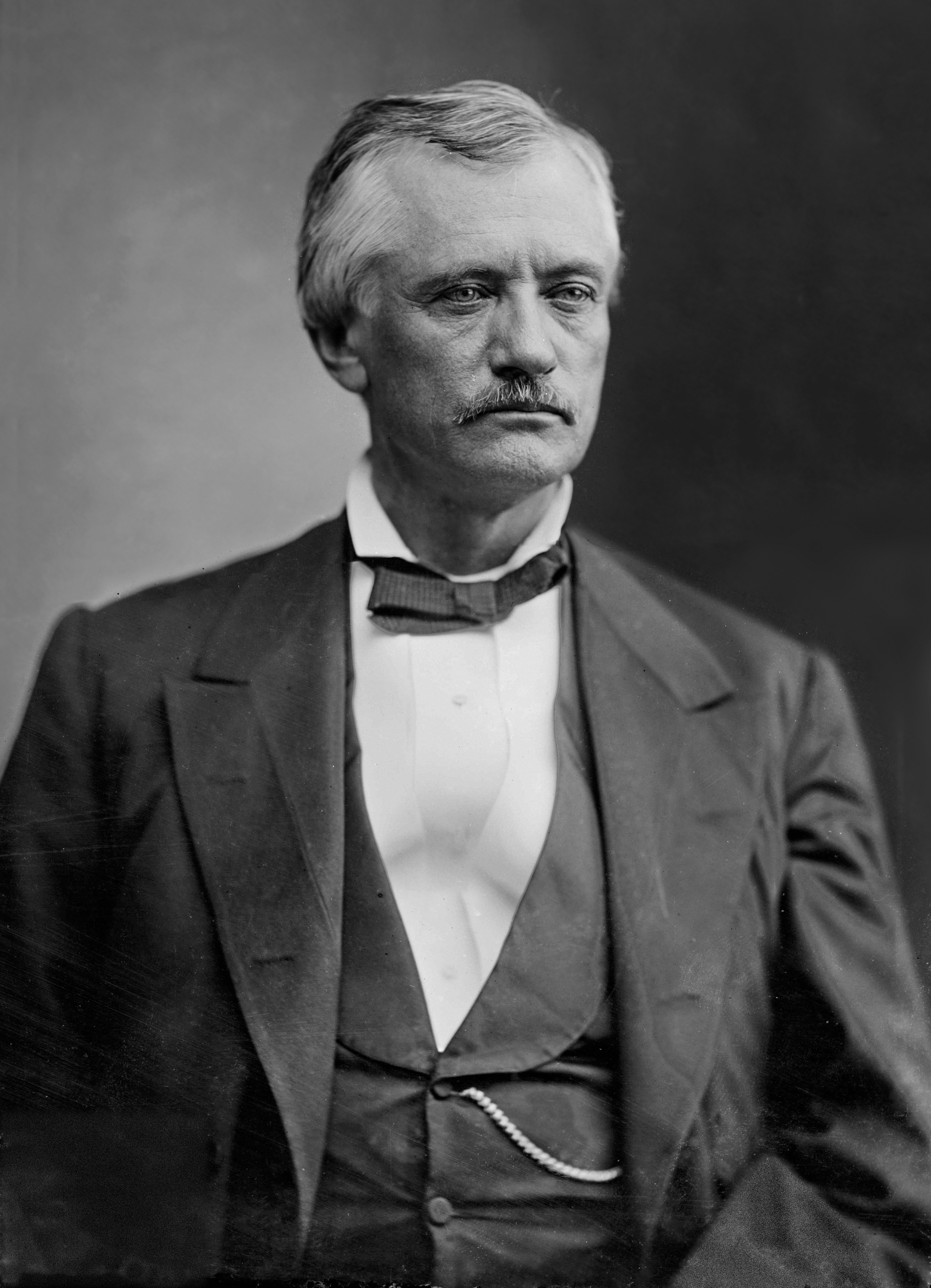
John Morgan

=== 1894 Senate (Morgan) investigation ===
Dissatisfied with Blount's findings, pro-annexation elements in the U.S. Senate sought another viewpoint. In 1894, the U.S. Senate Foreign Relations Committee sent Senator John Tyler Morgan to make a second investigation. Morgan, a staunch segregationist and former Grand Dragon of the Ku Klux Klan who had speculated on the use of Hawaii (along with the Philippines, Congo, and Cuba) as an alternative site for relocation of Blacks, was sent to challenge Blount's findings. Interviewing primarily white settlers, befriending coup organizer Lorrin Thurston and emphasizing the strategic value of Hawaii, Morgan's report exonerated the U.S. military of direct responsibility, however the United States has since admitted to the wrong-doing of their military in the Apology Resolution. Though the report was never accepted by the Senate, it was used in subsequent years to justify the U.S.' actions. Meanwhile, Minister Stevens had already been reprimanded and forced into retirement by the Cleveland administration for his unauthorized role in the coup. Stevens did not oppose this action, having lost a child to drowning in Maine just three days after the Overthrow, which had plunged him into deep depression. He was exonerated by Morgan's report shortly before his own death in 1895. Stevens also received a silver tea service made of melted Hawaiian Kingdom coins in thanks from the new Provisional Government, which is still in curation by his descendants.

=== 1895 trial and abdication ===
In 1895, a small group of royalists led by Robert William Kalanihiapo Wilcox clashed with Republic forces on the slopes of Diamond Head, and in Mōʻiliʻili. Casualties were minimal. The Republic, by this time, was extremely well-armed: not only had Sanford B. Dole spent the Kingdom's money on armaments, he had borrowed additional money to arm and pay a formidable militia. Wilcox and the others, including two haole of prominent families, were arrested. Liliʻuokalani was accused of "conspiring" with and "aiding" them, and although evidence was scanty, she was found guilty and imprisoned in a room in ʻIolani Palace for several months. Wilcox and five others were tried for treason, and sentenced to be hanged. The imprisoned Queen was given an ultimatum: if she formally abdicated, Wilcox and the others would be pardoned. Whether or not she supported their actions, the Queen did not want these men to die. She was forced to sign an abdication statement, pre-written by the provisional government, praising that government and relinquishing her personal right to the throne. She was directed to sign as "Liliʻuokalani Dominis", which was her legal name, after marrying a Caucasian man.

=== Annexation and anti-annexation campaigns ===
From 1893 to 1896, the Republic of Hawaii actively sought annexation to the United States. However, despite intensive debate on the matter in the legislature, annexation was strongly opposed by Cleveland, the native people of Hawaii, and much of Congress; the Turpie Resolution in 1894 took annexation off the table entirely.

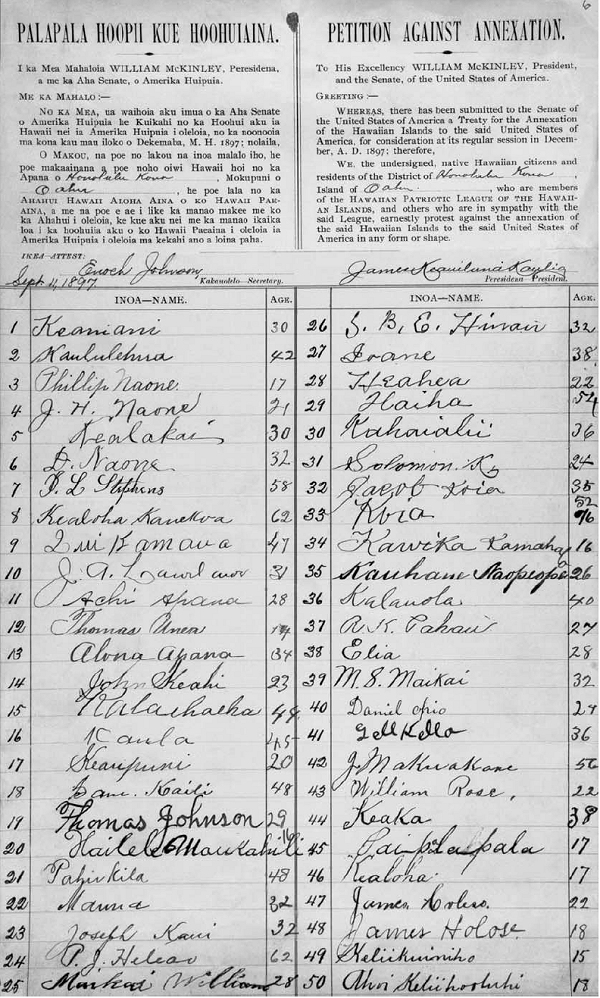
Anti-Annexation petitions, signed by the majority of adults in Hawaii, 1897

In 1896, expansionist presidential candidate William McKinley was elected president. In 1897, McKinley negotiated a treaty with the Republic of Hawaii, which he attempted unsuccessfully to pass through Congress; however, only 46 of the 60 requisite votes were procured, and so the treaty failed.

Senator Pettigrew and Senator Turpie insisted that the Kanaka Maoli of Hawaii be given a chance to vote on annexation. But Senator Morgan and the other pro-annexation Senators knew that if a vote were taken, it would be overwhelmingly in favor of Hawaii's independence. In a report, these Senators wrote, "If a requirement should be made by the United States of a plebiscite [vote] to determine the question of annexation, it would work a revolution in Hawaii which would abolish its constitution." They knew, in other words, that if the people were allowed to vote, not only would they reject annexation, they would also reject the Republic that had been forced upon them against their will.

The majority of the native population in Hawaii was indeed vociferously opposed to U.S. annexation. In a single weeklong petition drive, 21,000 signatures—representing well over half of the adult population of Hawaii at the time—were procured by horseback, boat and foot travel. These petitions were hand-carried to Washington and delivered to the United States Senate.

=== Spanish–American War and Newlands Resolution ===
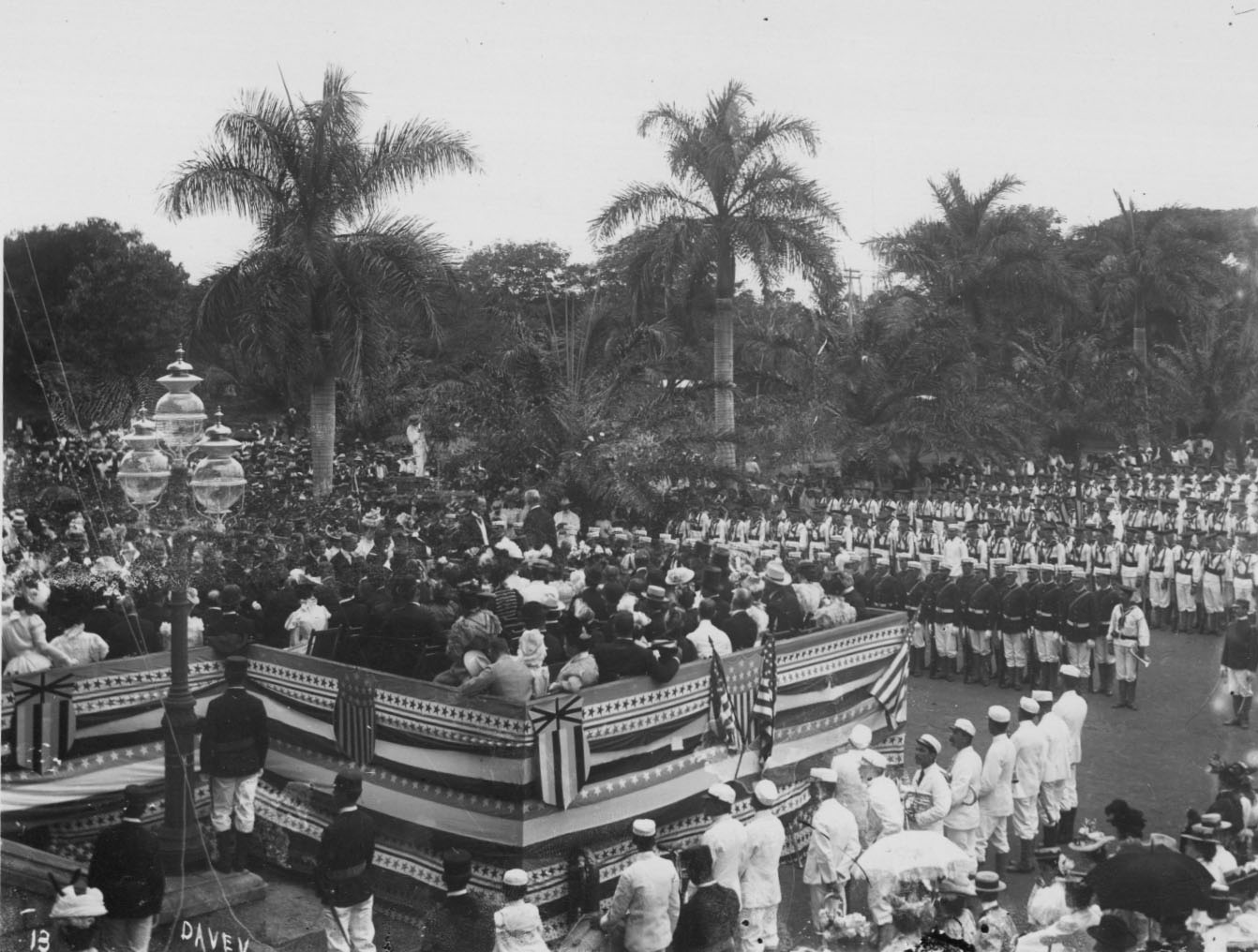
U.S. and Republic troops at U.S. flag-raising in 1898

In 1898, Cuba and the Philippines declared independence from Spain. The U.S. declared war on Spain as well in response to the USS Maine ship in Havana Harbor being blown up. With the Spanish–American War as its rationale, the United States Congress passed a joint resolution, referred to as the Newlands Resolution, by a simple majority of both houses. The flag of the United States was raised over Hawaii on August 12, 1898, protected by the United States Navy.

=== Territory of Hawaii ===
The Territory of Hawaii officially lasted from April 30, 1900, when President McKinley signed the Hawaiian Organic Act, until 1959. U.S. military expansion was enormous during this period, and commerce grew intensively. At the same time, use of the Hawaiian language was punished in schools, and native cultural practitioners were repressed.

=== Statehood plebiscite and Admissions Act ===
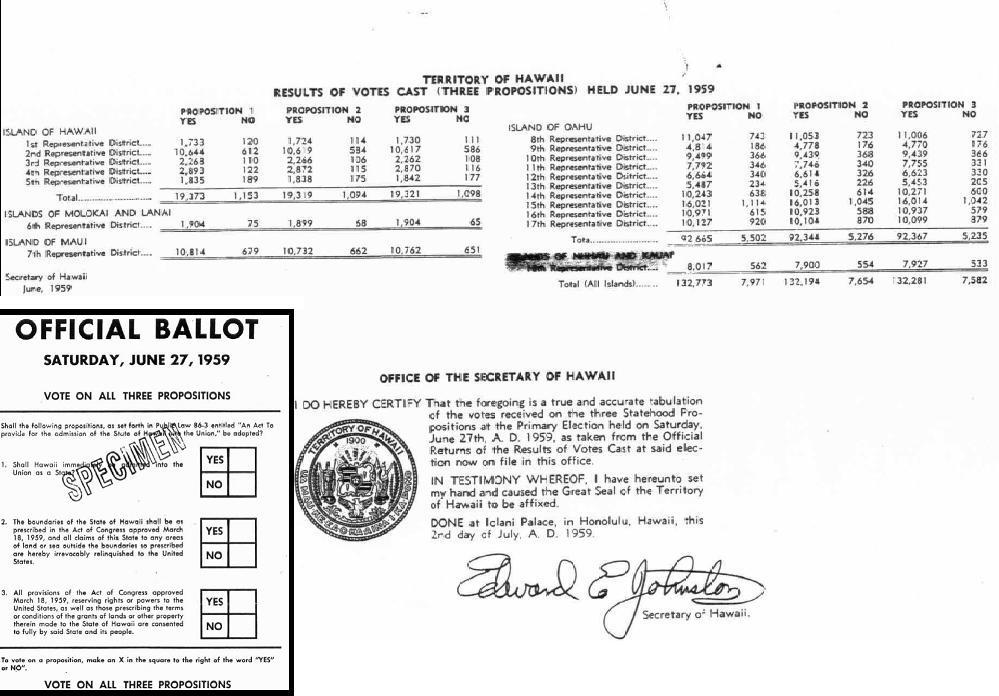
Ballot (inset) and referendum results for the Admission Act of 1959, showing choice between State and Territory status.

From the time of the United Nations' formation in 1946 until 1959, Hawaii was on the United Nations list of non-self-governing territories eligible for decolonization. The United States proposed a vote between two options: 1) become a State by passing the Hawaii Admission Act, or 2) remain a United States Territory. 93% of voters supported statehood in the statehood vote.

=== Permanent Court of Arbitration, the Hague, Netherlands ===
The Permanent Court of Arbitration decided in 2002 to drop a case brought by a private citizen against an entity calling itself the Kingdom of Hawaii.

The Tribunal concluded that it could not determine whether the Respondent has failed to discharge its obligations towards the Claimant without ruling on the legality of the acts of the United States of America – something the Tribunal was precluded from doing as the United States was not party to the case.

== Legal views on Hawaiian annexation ==
Critics argue the Newlands Resolution was not a legally permissible way to acquire territory under the U.S. Constitution, claiming that annexation of a foreign territory required a treaty. As such, they alleged that Hawaii is an independent nation under military occupation in which the Hague Conventions of 1899 and 1907 and the Fourth Geneva Convention continue to apply.

However, advocates stated the precedent was relied upon by the 1845 joint resolution that authorized the Texas annexation to the United States. In the 1901 case, DeLima v. Bidwell, the United States Supreme Court ruled that annexation via a joint resolution of Congress was legal according to American law. The court wrote:

A treaty made by that power is said to be the supreme law of the land—as efficacious as an act of Congress; and, if subsequent and inconsistent with an act of Congress, repeals it. This must be granted, and also that "one of the ordinary incidents of a treaty is the cession of territory," and that "the territory thus acquired is acquired as absolutely as if the annexation were made, as in the case of Texas and Hawaii, by an act of Congress."

In Territory of Hawaii v. Mankichi in 1903, the U.S. Supreme Court noted that "the status of the islands and the powers of their provisional government were measured by the Newlands resolution[.]" That point was made even more forcefully in a separate opinion in the case filed by Justice John Marshall Harlan. Harlan disagreed with the court on a different issue which concerned Hawaiian law as to jury trials, but on the issue of the validity of the Newlands resolution, he agreed fully with the majority, stating:

"By the resolution, the annexation of the Hawaiian Islands became complete, and the object of the proposed treaty, that 'those islands should be incorporated into the United States as an integral part thereof, and under its sovereignty' was accomplished."

In the 1910 case, Liliuokalani v. The United States, Liliʻuokalani's claims of personal ownership of the crown lands were denied by the United States Court of Claims, based primarily on Hawaiian Kingdom law.

== Contemporary legal actions ==
=== Hawaii v. Office of Hawaiian Affairs, (2009) ===
According to the decision of the U.S. Supreme Court of March 31, 2009, the "whereas" clauses of the 1993 Congressional Apology Resolution have no binding effect, and the resolution does not change or modify the "absolute" title to the public lands of the State of Hawaii. The decision also affirmed that federal legislation cannot retroactively cloud title given as a part of statehood in general and that the State of Hawaii has not established title to all land transferred to it from the federal government in 1959. The case was remanded to the State Supreme court to allow an injunction from the alienation of the Crown or Ceded lands, allowing for a finding consistent with federal law. Justice Alito in his opinion held that the court did not have jurisdiction over Hawaiian Law and suggested the question of who held "Perfect title" would have to be settled by further litigation.

== U.S. investigations ==
=== The Blount Report ===
On July 17, 1893, James H. Blount was sent by Grover Cleveland under secret orders shortly after his inauguration, Blount's investigation led him to believe that the U.S. was directly responsible for the overthrow of Queen Liliuokalani. He reported back to President Cleveland, who took steps to reinstate the queen based on Blount's information. As the president of the Provisional Government of Hawaii flatly refused to reinstate the Queen, Cleveland referred the matter to Congress on December 18, 1893, with a blistering letter condemning what he believed at the time to be the U.S. role in the overthrow.

=== The Morgan Report ===
On February 26, 1894, after Cleveland's referral of the matter to Congress, a second investigation committee was formed under the leadership of Senator John Tyler Morgan, an expansionist and segregationist. Over the course of several months, with extensive testimony under cross examination, they came to the exact opposite conclusion that Blount reached. In their conclusions, the U.S. military was completely exonerated, and blame for the Hawaiian Revolution was placed squarely on the shoulders of Queen Liliuokalani.

=== United States Commission on Civil Rights report ===
Considering the Akaka Bill on May 4, 2006, the United States Commission on Civil Rights found that the Hawaiian Kingdom "included Native Hawaiians, but also included residents of other races and ethnicities." They recommended strongly against the Akaka Bill as "legislation that would discriminate on the basis of race or national origin and further subdivide the American people".

== U.S. legislation ==
- Turpie Resolution, May 31, 1894
- Newlands Resolution, July 4, 1898
- Hawaiian Organic Act, April 30, 1900
- Apology Resolution, November 23, 1993

== See also ==
- Aloha ʻĀina
- Bayonet Constitution
- Black Week
- Declaration on the Granting of Independence to Colonial Countries and Peoples
- Declaration on the Rights of Indigenous Peoples
- Filipino-American War
- Hawaiian sovereignty movement
- Legal status of Alaska
- Legal status of Texas
- Nation-building
- Platt Amendment
- Right to exist
- Self-determination
- State formation
- Teller Amendment
- Treaty of Manila
- Treaty of Paris
- Tribal sovereignty
- Universal Declaration of Human Rights
- United States involvement in regime change
