= Apology Resolution =

1993 U.S. joint resolution on Hawaii

- Long title: A joint resolution to acknowledge the 100th anniversary of the January 17, 1893 overthrow of the Kingdom of Hawaii, and to offer an apology to Native Hawaiians on behalf of the United States for the overthrow of the Kingdom of Hawaii.
- Enacted by: the 103rd United States Congress
- Effective: November 23, 1993

Legislative history
- Introduced in the Senate as S.J.Res. 19 by Daniel Akaka (D–HI) on January 21, 1993; Committee consideration by Senate Indian Affairs; Passed the Senate on October 27, 1993 (65–34); Passed the House on November 15, 1993 (voice vote); Signed into law by President Bill Clinton on November 23, 1993

Public Law 103-150, informally known as the Apology Resolution, is a joint resolution of the U.S. Congress adopted in 1993 that "acknowledges that the overthrow of the Kingdom of Hawaii occurred with the active participation of agents and citizens of the United States and further acknowledges that the Native Hawaiian people never directly relinquished to the United States their claims to their inherent sovereignty as a people over their national lands, either through the Kingdom of Hawaii or through a plebiscite or referendum" (U.S. Public Law 103-150 (107 Stat. 1510)). The resolution has been cited as impetus for the Hawaiian sovereignty movement, and has been the subject of debate.

The resolution was adopted by both houses of the United States Congress on November 23, 1993. A joint resolution, it was signed by President of the United States Bill Clinton on the same day.

The resolution was passed in the Senate by a vote of 65–34. In the House, it was passed by a two-thirds voice vote. It was sponsored on January 21, 1993, as S.J.Res.19 by Daniel Akaka and co-sponsored by Daniel Inouye, both Democratic senators from Hawaii.

== Arguments for ==
=== Historical evidence ===
The Apology Resolution derives mainly from the Blount Report, which was compiled shortly after the overthrow of the Hawaiian monarchy (spring 1893). Blount found strongly in the favor of Queen Liliʻuokalani and her supporters, and his report was an official criticism of the U.S. role in the overthrow. President Grover Cleveland was also strongly supportive of the Queen, and made official statements supporting the view held in the Blount Report. These official statements by the U.S. government are seen as historical evidence for the claims made by the Apology Resolution.

=== Parallels between Native Hawaiians and Native Americans ===
Although the histories of Native Hawaiians and Native Americans are significantly different, there is still a widely held perception that Native Hawaiians have received similar kinds of unfair treatment from the U.S. government as Native Americans. The Apology Bill is thus seen as a means of acknowledging historical grievances that they believe are valid. Some also see it as a step towards identifying Native Hawaiians as an indigenous people to preserve for them specific legal rights based on ancestry; some also see it as the beginning of a process to provide compensation or reparation to native Hawaiians for alleged past injustices.

How this decision on the "nonsubstantive" nature of the Apology Resolution will affect the pursuit of the Akaka Bill, which has based itself on the Apology Resolution, is not yet clear.

In 2009, the U.S. Congress passed a similar resolution, S.J.Res. 14, "To acknowledge a long history of official depredations and ill-conceived policies by the Federal Government regarding Indian tribes and offer an apology to all Native Peoples on behalf of the United States."

== Arguments against ==
=== Disputed historical basis ===
Although the Blount Report of July 17, 1893, upon which the Apology Resolution was based, was an official report of the U.S. government, it was followed by the Morgan Report on February 26, 1894, which after public hearings and testimony under oath found the Blount Report to be mistaken on many of the facts reported. Some of the criticisms of the Blount Report included the fact that it was done in secrecy, with no opportunity for cross-examination of witnesses and no witnesses placed under oath. Opponents of the Apology Resolution point to this official repudiation of the Blount Report as sufficient reason to dismiss any conclusions based on it. Despite being staunchly in favor of reinstating the monarchy, President Grover Cleveland also reversed himself upon receipt of the Morgan Report, refusing requests from the queen for further aid in her restoration, and acknowledging both the Provisional Government and Republic of Hawaii as the legitimate successors to the Kingdom.

Washington-based constitutional lawyer and Grassroot Institute of Hawaii consultant Bruce Fein has outlined a number of counterarguments challenging the historical accuracy and completeness of the assertions made in the Apology Resolution.

=== Allegations that the bill was rushed through ===
There has been criticism of the 1993 Apology Bill for its use in buttressing the Akaka Bill. The Apology Bill of 1993 was passed with only one hour of debate on the Senate floor with only five senators participating, three opposed (Slade Gorton, Hank Brown, John C. Danforth) and two in favor (Akaka and Inouye). It passed the house on November 15 in less time with no debate and no objections. Senator Inouye, wrapping up the debate, said:

As to the matter of the status of Native Hawaiians, as my colleague from Washington knows, from the time of statehood we have been in this debate. Are Native Hawaiians Native Americans? This resolution has nothing to do with that.

The reliance upon the text of the Apology Resolution as justification for the Akaka Bill has been seen by some as contradicting Inouye's statements on the matter in 1993.

In 1993, Senators Slade Gorton and Hank Brown did not take issue with the historical accuracy of the bill, although they voted against it. More recently they have described it as being a piece of historical revisionism. They wrote an article in The Wall Street Journal titled "The Opposite Of Progress" in which they were critical of the historical veracity of the Apology Bill.

== Practical legal effect ==
In a response to the State of Hawai'i Appeal of the Arakaki Decision, the plaintiffs argued that the "whereas" clauses should not be given legal effect.

Legislative statements in a preamble may help a court interpret the operative clauses of a particular statute by clarifying the legislative intent, but they do not legislate facts or confer rights. Singer, Sutherland on Statutory Construction, §20.03 (5th ed. 1993). The Apology Resolution has no legally operative provisions. Indeed, it expressly settles no claims. 107 Stat. 1510 §3. The committee report says that the Resolution has no regulatory impact and does not change any law. S. Rep. 123-126. Its sponsor assured the Senate that it is only "a simple resolution of apology" and that it "has nothing to do" with "the status of Native Hawaiians." 139 Congressional Record S14477, S14482 (October 27, 1993), SER 14. The Supreme Court in Rice demonstrated how to deal with the Apology Resolution: the Court cited it but decided the case based on the facts in the record.

In testimony before the United States Senate Committee on the Judiciary, April 17, 2002, Michael Glennon opined that whereas clauses have "no binding legal effect":

Under traditional principles of statutory construction, these provisions have no binding legal effect. Only material that comes after the so-called "resolving clause"—"Resolved by the Senate and House of Representatives of the United States of America in Congress assembled"—can have any operative effect. Material set out in a whereas clause is purely precatory. It may be relevant for the purpose of clarifying ambiguities in a statute’s legally operative terms, but in and of itself such a provision can confer no legal right or obligation.

In March 2009, the US Supreme Court ruled in Hawaii v. Office of Hawaiian Affairs that the Apology Resolution's 37 whereas clauses have no legally binding effects and therefore did not create any new rights for native Hawaiians to raise legal claims. In its unanimous decision, the Supreme Court noted that federal legislation cannot retroactively alter the Hawaiian state government's ownership over its land when granted as part of its admission to the United States.
