= William Burgess =

William Burgess may refer to:

- William Burgess (cricketer) (1888–1970), English cricketer
- William Burgess (painter) (died 1812), English painter
- William Burgess (politician) (1847–1917), member of the Tasmanian Parliament
- Bill Burgess (rugby league, born 1897), English rugby league footballer who played in the 1910s, 1920s and 1930s
- Bill Burgess (rugby, born 1939), English rugby union, and rugby league footballer who played in the 1960s and 1970s
- William Burgess (sailor) (born 1930), Canadian yacht racer
- William J. Burgess (died 1996), American politician
- William Oakley Burgess (died 1844), engraver
- William Starling Burgess (1878–1947), American yacht designer, aviation pioneer, and naval architect
- H. William Burgess (1929–2016), Hawaiian lawyer
- Ron Burgess (footballer) (William Arthur Ronald Burgess, 1917–2005), Welsh international association football player, and later manager

== See also ==
- Bill Burgess (disambiguation)
- William Burges (1827–1881), English architect and designer
- William Burges (politician) (1806/8–1876), early settler in Western Australia
- William Sinclair-Burgess (1880–1964), New Zealand Army major general who served with Australian Forces during World War I
