= H. William Burgess =

American lawyer

H. William Burgess (March 13, 1929 – March 16, 2016) was an attorney who lived in Hawaii. He opposed the Hawaiian sovereignty movement and of government programs that benefit Native Hawaiians. Burgess brought two lawsuits seeking to have such programs declared unconstitutional.

== Notable cases ==
=== Arakaki v. State of Hawaii ===
In July 2000, Burgess filed suit against the State of Hawaii on behalf of 13 plaintiffs, among them Kenneth R. Conklin. The lawsuit, Arakaki v. State of Hawaii, challenged the requirement that trustees of the Office of Hawaiian Affairs (OHA) be of Hawaiian ancestry, on the basis of the Fourteenth Amendment, the Fifteenth Amendment and the Voting Rights Act. In August 2000, U.S. District Judge Helen Gillmor ruled against the OHA requirement, clearing the way for the plaintiff, Conklin: a non-Hawaiian, to make an unsuccessful election bid for OHA office that November. Two years later, in December 2002, the United States Court of Appeals for the Ninth Circuit upheld Gillmor's ruling clearing the way for all non-Hawaiians to run for election, and to serve if elected, as trustees of OHA, but based the ruling only on the Fifteenth Amendment finding it unnecessary to rule on the Fourteenth Amendment.

=== Arakaki v. Lingle ===
In March 2002, Burgess teamed up again with another attorney, Patrick W. Hanifin, to file a second lawsuit, Arakaki v. Lingle, on behalf of 16 plaintiffs challenging the constitutionality of OHA and the Hawaiian Homes Commission Act, demanding they be dismantled. In November 2003 U.S. District Judge Susan Oki Mollway removed the Hawaiian Homelands-related entities and the U.S. federal government from the suit and in January 2004 dismissed the rest of the suit on the grounds that legislatures, not courts, should decide the questions at issue. In August 2005, a 2 to 1 decision by the U.S. Ninth Circuit Court of Appeals reversed Mollway, finding that state taxpayers had standing to challenge appropriation of tax moneys to OHA.

On February 2, 2006, Hawaii Governor Linda Lingle petitioned the U.S. Supreme Court for a writ of certiorari, arguing that state citizens "simply because they pay taxes to the state", may not challenge her and other officials' use of some public money, land and privileges exclusively for one race. The petition asked the high court to resolve the "very important and fundamental state taxpayer standing questions" presented.

The plaintiffs, Earl Arakaki and 13 other Hawaii residents, saw the governor's petition as an opportunity for the Supreme Court to resolve all standing questions. On March 3, 2006, the plaintiffs filed a Conditional Cross-Petition for a Writ of Certiorari, asking the Supreme Court, if it granted the Governor's petition, to also grant theirs, and review all the "standing" orders including those dismissing plaintiffs' "very important and fundamental" trust beneficiary standing, as well as the orders restricting their state taxpayer standing.

On March 7, 2006, the plaintiffs filed a Brief in Opposition to the governor, pointing out that they did not sue "simply because they pay taxes", but because the state does not treat all taxpayers equally. It singles out plaintiffs and other taxpayers similarly situated and denies them the benefit of the part of their taxes used exclusively for those of the favored racial ancestry.

On March 9, 2006, twenty states filed an amicus curiae brief in support of the governor's petition. They argued that "certiorari is necessary to restore certainty to the law".

On May 8, 2006, the Solicitor General filed a brief for the United States in opposition to the cross petition, arguing that the plaintiffs lacked standing to sue because the U.S. "does not require the State of Hawaii to impose taxes to support those undertakings". As to Plaintiffs' trust beneficiary claims, the Solicitor General argued that the HHCA and Admission Act "extinguished any trustee role that the United States might once have had".

The plaintiffs filed their reply brief on May 17, 2006.

== Aloha for All ==
In 1999 Burgess and his wife created the Aloha for All website to spread their message that every citizen of Hawaii is entitled to the equal protection of the laws whatever his or her ancestry. In 2003, former Honolulu Advertiser publisher Thurston Twigg-Smith founded a limited liability corporation called Aloha for All.

On August 14, 2005, Honolulu Advertiser reported that Burgess was both lead attorney for Aloha for All and legal counsel for the Grassroot Institute of Hawaii, a second non-profit that had lobbied against the Akaka Bill. In response, both Burgess and Grassroot Institute of Hawaii stated that Burgess was a member but had never been legal counsel for the Grassroot Institute, and that Grassroot's role with respect to the Akaka bill had been to foster public education and discourse.
