= Bill Burgess (disambiguation) =

Bill Burgess (1872–1950) was the second person to successfully complete a swim of the English Channel.

Bill Burgess may also refer to:

- Bill Burgess (American football) (1941–2023), American football player and coach
- Bill Burgess (rugby, born 1939), English rugby union and rugby league footballer
- Bill Burgess (rugby league, born 1897) (1897–?), English rugby league footballer

== See also ==
- William Burgess (disambiguation)
