= John D. Waiheʻe IV =

American politician

John Waiheʻe IV

Member of the Office of Hawaiian Affairs Board of Trustees
- In office November 28, 2000 – November 3, 2026
- Preceded by: Frenchy DeSoto; Mililani Trask
- Succeeded by: Ikaika Anderson
- Constituency: At-large district

Personal details
- Born: John David Waiheʻe IV; 1969 or 1970 (age 55–56) Michigan, U.S.
- Party: Democratic
- Relatives: John D. Waiheʻe III (father); Lynne Waihee (mother)
- Education: Honolulu Community College (AA)

John David Waiheʻe IV (born 1969/1970) is a Native Hawaiian politician. From 2000 to 2026, he served as an At-Large Trustee for the Office of Hawaiian Affairs (OHA). He is the son of John D. Waiheʻe III, former Governor of Hawaii, who was instrumental in creating OHA. In the 2026 Office of Hawaiian Affairs election, Waiheʻe lost his At-Large seat in the general election.

== Early life and education ==
Waiheʻe was born in Michigan and grew up in Kalihi, a neighborhood of Honolulu, Hawaiʻi. He attended Hawaiian Mission Academy in Honolulu and graduated from Honolulu Community College in 1993 with an associate degree in commercial arts.

== Career ==
Prior to elected office, Waiheʻe worked as a bar manager at Keo's restaurant in Waikīkī.

He has also served on the Kahoʻolawe Island Reserve Commission, the Native Hawaiian Historic Preservation Council, and the King Kamehameha Hawaiian Civic Club, and has been affiliated with the National Association for the Advancement of Colored People and the Japanese American Citizens League.

=== Office of Hawaiian Affairs (2000–2026) ===
Waiheʻe was first elected on November 7, 2000 and took office as an At-Large Trustee upon election certification on November 28, 2000. He was ceremonially sworn in at an investiture at Kawaiahaʻo Church on December 20, 2000. He was first motivated to run for OHA after the U.S. Supreme Court's decision in Rice v. Cayetano opened the door for non-Native Hawaiians to serve on the board.

Upon his election at age 30, he was the youngest member of the board. By 2022, he became the longest-serving member on the board. Among his top priorities on the board have been Hawaiian home ownership and housing. His accomplishments include initiating partnerships with Waimea Valley for land acquisition and the Center for Hawaiian Studies at the University of Hawaiʻi to create new classes and a PhD program.

In 2018, a state audit report found questionable trustee allowance spending, including Waihee's expenses of an airplane upgrade and a beneficiary's rent. The ethics commission later determined ethics rules were not broken.

From 2025 to 2026, Waiheʻe served as the chair of the Budget and Finance Committee. After losing his seat in2026, his term in office ended on November 3, 2026, the day of the general election.
