= Arakaki v. Hawaii =

Arakaki v. State of Hawai'i
- Court: United States Court of Appeals for the Ninth Circuit
- Full case name: Earl F. Arakaki, Evelyn C. Arakaki, Patrick Barrett, Sandra P. Burgess, Edward U. Bugarin, Patricia A. Carroll, Robert M. Chapman, Brian Clarke, Kenneth R. Conklin, Michael Y. Garcia, Toby M. Kravet, Thurston Twigg-smith, and Jean Yokoyama v. State of Hawaii, Benjamin J. Cayetano, in His Official Capacity As the Governor of the State of Hawaii, Dwayne D. Yoshina, in His Official Capacity As Chief Election Officer of the State of Hawaii
- Argued: May 6, 2002
- Decided: December 31, 2002
- Citation: 314 F.3d 1091

Case history
- Prior history: No. 00-cv-514 (D. Haw.)

Court membership
- Judges sitting: J. Clifford Wallace, A. Wallace Tashima, Richard C. Tallman

Case opinions
- Majority: Tashima, joined by Tallman
- Concurrence: Wallace

Arakaki v. Hawaii, 314 F.3d 1091 (9th Cir. 2002), was a lawsuit challenging the requirement that candidates for election to the Office of Hawaiian Affairs board of trustees be Native Hawaiians.

In 2000, after being barred from applying for nomination papers in June because he was not of Hawaiian ancestry, Kenneth R. Conklin was one of 13 plaintiffs in a controversial lawsuit Arakaki v. State of Hawai'i challenging the requirement that candidates for election to the Office of Hawaiian Affairs board of trustees be Hawaiian. The suit, argued by attorneys H. William Burgess and co-counsel Patrick W. Hanifin, claimed the restriction violated the equal protection clause of the Fourteenth Amendment, the Fifteenth Amendment, and the Voting Rights Act. In August, U.S. District Judge Helen Gillmor issued a judgment allowing non-Hawaiians to run for OHA trustee. Conklin then ran unsuccessfully for OHA trustee in November 2000, placing 4th out of 20 candidates for one "at large" seat. (The winner, Haunani Apoliona, took 58,264 votes or 15.7%, and Conklin took 18,115 votes or 4.9% - there were also 117,597 blank votes or 31.7%)
