= Linda Dela Cruz =

Hawaiian singer and activist

- Born: November 20, 1929; Honolulu, Oahu, Territory of Hawaii
- Died: March 15, 2007 (aged 77) Hilo, Hawaii
- Occupation: vocalist
- Formerly of: Halekulani Girls

Linda Dela Cruz (November 20, 1929 – March 15, 2007) was a Native Hawaiian singer known as "Hawaii's Canary" and acclaimed for the Hawaiian "ha'i" (falsetto) style of singing. She was honored as an inductee of the Hawaiian Music Hall of Fame twice, once in 2006 as an individual and again in 2015 as part of the Halekulani Girls. After retiring from her musical career, Dela Cruz worked as an activist for Hawaiian rights and served on the board of trustees of the Office of Hawaiian Affairs.

== Early life and education ==
Lillian Leialoha Keaweehu was born in Honolulu on November 20, 1929. Her family moved to Papakolea when she was twelve years old. She attended President William McKinley High School, Windward Community College, and the University of Hawaiʻi at Hilo.

== Musical career ==
As a child Linda would listen to Lena Machado records and sing at family parties. She began singing at large outdoor jam sessions as a teenager and was recruited to record at Bell Records at age sixteen, eventually becoming the label's premier soloist. Linda was promoted as "Hawaii's Canary" as an echo of Lena Machado's nickname, "Hawaii's Songbird". Dela Cruz's first professional performance was at the Holoholo Inn, located at King Street and Dillingham Boulevard in Honolulu; she would perform at venues such as Café Pagoda, Club Polynesia, and the Halekulani Hotel.

After starting as a solo artist, she and Sybil Bright Andrews joined Alice Fredlund's group, the Halekulani Girls, becoming Hawaii's most popular trio in the late 1950s. Hawaiian music historian Harry B. Soria Jr. described Dela Cruz's impressive vocal range in the liner notes of a 2005 anthology of her music, saying "her voice climbed the peaks of any soprano register in one moment and descended to the deep guttural chants of her ancestors in the next."

She retired from the music business in 1975.

== Activism and later life ==
In the 1960s Dela Cruz owned and operated Linda's School of Hula in Kaneohe, where she taught hula. In 1975 she and her husband moved to a 10-acre guava orchard near Hilo on Hawaiian home land.

She served as president for several organizations including the Pana'ewa Farmers Association, the Pana'ewa Hawaiian Homes Community Association, and the Keaukaha-Pana'ewa Community Association. Dela Cruz sued the Department of Hawaiian Home Lands as part of an effort to prevent publicly held land being ceded to private entrepreneurs. She ran for public office unsuccessfully multiple times in the 1980s and 1990s.

Dela Cruz was elected as a trustee of the Office of Hawaiian Affairs in 2000, representing the island of Hawaii. She was reelected in 2004 and served until her death. Dela Cruz died March 15, 2007, at her home in Hilo. During her time on the OHA board of trustees, she advocated for programs such as a native Hawaiian registry and a microloan program for native Hawaiians in emergency situations.

== Honors and awards ==
She was honored by the members of the Hawaii Academy of Recording Arts with a Na Hoku Hanohano Lifetime Achievement Award in 2003. Dela Cruz was inducted into the Hawaiian Music Hall of Fame in 2006 for her solo musical career. In 2015, Dela Cruz was named an honoree of the Hawaiian Music Hall of Fame again, as a member of the Halekulani Girls.

Hawaii Governor Linda Lingle declared March 30, 2007 Linda Dela Cruz Day in recognition of her achievements.
