= Ikaika Anderson =

American politician

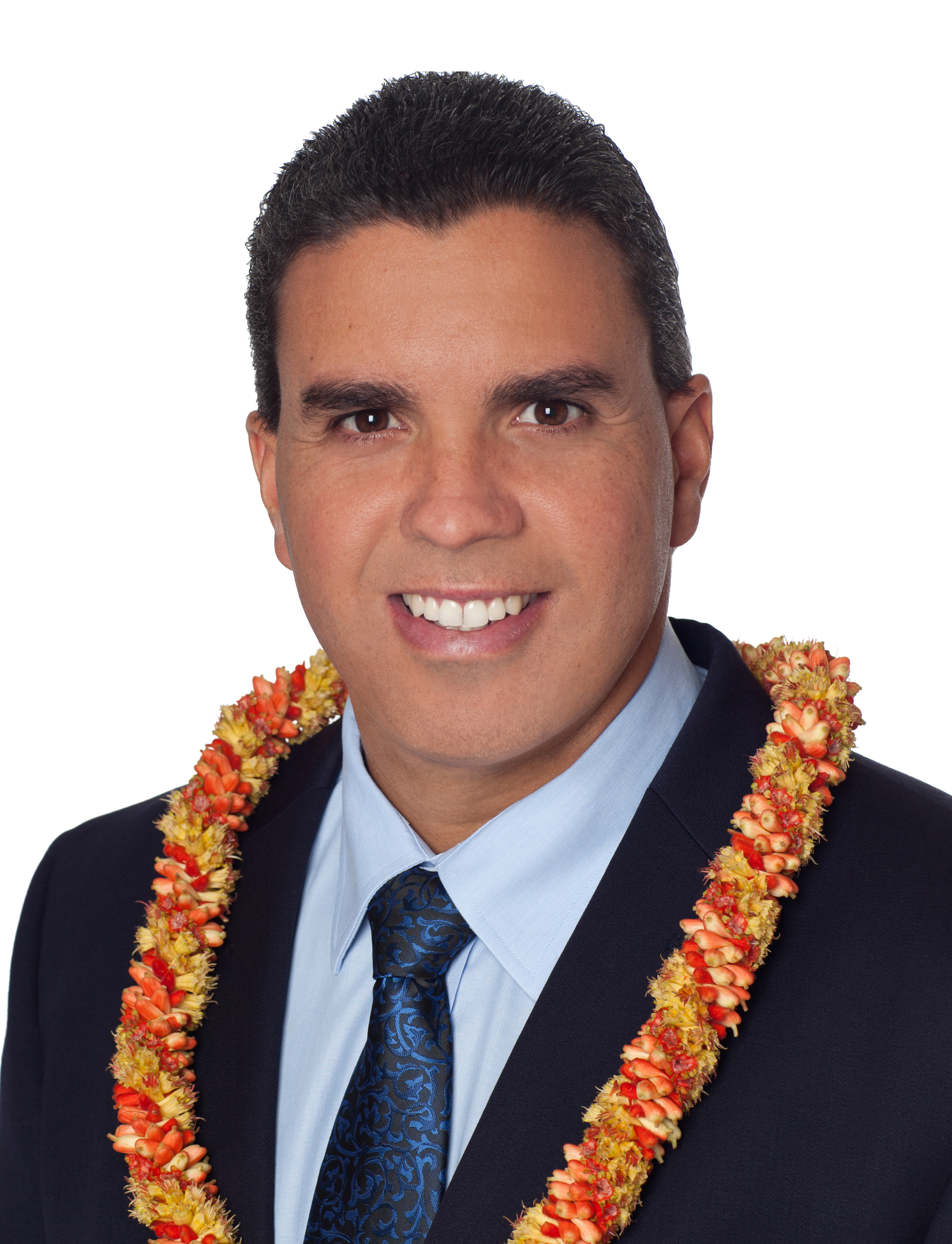
- Anderson in 2014

Member of the Office of Hawaiian Affairs Board of Trustees
- Incumbent
- Assumed office November 3, 2026
- Preceded by: John Waihee IV
- Constituency: At-Large Trustee

Chair of the Honolulu City Council
- In office May 2019 – September 23, 2020
- Preceded by: Ernest Martin
- Succeeded by: Tommy Waters

Vice Chair of the Honolulu City Council
- In office July 2011 – May 2019
- Preceded by: Breene Harimoto
- Succeeded by: Ann Kobayashi

Member of the Honolulu City Council from the 3rd district
- In office May 27, 2009 – September 23, 2020
- Preceded by: Barbara Marshall
- Succeeded by: Esther Kiaʻāina

Personal details
- Born: Justin-Michael Ikaika Anderson; February 5, 1978 (age 48) Honolulu, Hawaii, U.S.
- Party: Democratic
- Children: 4
- Relatives: Whitney Anderson (grandfather); D. G. Anderson (grand-uncle)
- Education: University of Hawaii, Manoa (BA)

Justin-Michael (Ikaika) Anderson (born February 5, 1978) is an American politician from Hawaii and a member of the Democratic Party. In 2026, Anderson assumed office as an At-Large Trustee on the Office of Hawaiian Affairs Board of Trustees.

Anderson formerly served as chair and presiding officer of the Honolulu City Council and councilmember for the Honolulu County's District 3 (which includes Waimānalo, Kailua and Kāneʻohe). Over his 11 years on the council from 2009 to 2020, he has also served as past vice chair and former chair of its Zoning and Planning Committee.

In September 2020, Anderson resigned from the Honolulu City Council to care for his grandparents, although he faced some criticism for taking a full-time job with Local 630 soon after resigning. While Anderson announced on September 9 that his resignation would be effective September 23, he had been working for Local 630 part-time since September 1.

In October 2021, Anderson announced his candidacy for lieutenant governor in the 2022 elections. He previously announced his intention to run for a seat in the U.S. House of Representatives (Hawaii's 1st congressional district) in the 2014 election but was defeated in the primary election by Mark Takai.

In 2022, Anderson was tapped by Governor Josh Green to lead the Department of Hawaiian Home Lands but was ultimately not confirmed by the Hawaii Senate.

In 2026, he successfully ran for an At-Large seat on the Board of Trustees for the Office of Hawaiian Affairs.

== Early life ==
Anderson was born on Oahu and raised on the windward side of the island by his single mother, Kim. His grandfather Whitney Anderson and his grand-uncle D.G. "Andy" Anderson both served in both chambers of the Hawaii State Legislature. At age two, Anderson was adopted by his grandparents and collectively raised by his grandparents and mother as hānai, a custom in Hawaii.

He attended and graduated from Kamehameha Schools and attended the University of Hawaiʻi at Mānoa. He earned Bachelor of Arts degrees in journalism and political science.

== Political career ==
While attending the University of Hawaiʻi at Mānoa, Anderson served on the Associated Students of the University of Hawaii (ASUH) Senate. While attending the University of Hawaii, Anderson was the assistant committee clerk for the Hawaii House of Representatives' Judiciary Committee. He worked as a clerk for five legislative sessions.

Anderson launched two unsuccessful Hawaii state legislature attempts. He was elected to the Honolulu City Council in a 2009 special election for the seat of the late Barbara Marshall. Anderson served as Marshall's legislative assistant and she mentored his political career. He was endorsed by Cliff Ziems, Marshall's husband, to succeed her seat on the city council. He was sworn into office on May 27, 2009. Anderson was a member of Honolulu's Agricultural Development Task Force and was the vice chair of the council as well as the chair of the Zoning and Planning Committee prior to being chair.

He won his reelection in 2012 with about 64 percent of the vote.

In June 2012, the Honolulu Ethics Commission issued a "stern advisory opinion" for Anderson's behavior during a parking incident in December 2010.

In August 2013, Anderson announced he would seek the democratic nomination for the U.S. House of Representatives for Hawaii's 1st congressional district, which encompasses the urban core of Honolulu. In the 2014 Democratic primary, Anderson received 6.7 percent of the votes, with the nomination going to Mark Takai.

In October 2015, the Honolulu Ethics Commission dismissed complaints against Anderson and other councilmembers over "claims that they failed to disclose gifts from lobbyists before taking critical rail votes."

In May 2018, Anderson (who was chair of the Honolulu City Council's Planning Committee at the time), introduced a bill to demolish large homes built without proper permitting in residential communities. The bill was signed into temporary law for two years on March 13, 2018, putting a moratorium on the homes.

In May 2019, Anderson was unanimously elected as Chair of the Honolulu City Council.

In August 2019, Anderson introduced a resolution to the city council that would allow voters to decide on the elimination of the Honolulu Authority for Rapid Transportation. The bill was deferred.

In May 2019, it was announced that Anderson is in the process of drafting a tax on vacant properties.

== Personal life ==
Anderson is a single father and caretaker for his ʻohana. He has four children: Tianni, JW and twins Kaleb and Kaili.

In May 2023, Anderson was charged with alleged domestic abuse of a family member. The case was dismissed with prejudice the following month.
