= Peter Apo =

Hawaiian politician and musician

- Apo in 2011

Member of the Office of Hawaiian Affairs
- In office 2011–2019
- Preceded by: Walter Heen
- Succeeded by: Kalei Akaka
- Constituency: Oʻahu

Personal details
- Born: 1939 (age 86–87)

Peter Apo (born c. 1939) is a Hawaiian politician and musician. He is a former trustee of the Office of Hawaiian Affairs and President of The Peter Apo Company, LLC, a cultural tourism consulting firm. He is also an accomplished musician in the folk and Hawaiian music genres, with a career stretching back to the early 1960s.

== Career ==
In 1980, Apo was elected to the first Board of Trustees of OHA. In 1982 he won election to the Hawaii State House of Representatives where he served for 14 years. In 1994 Honolulu Mayor Jeremy Harris appointed him to become the City’s Director of Culture and Arts. In 1996 he assumed the position of Special Assistant on Hawaiian Affairs to Governor Ben Cayetano. He subsequently returned to the City & County of Honolulu as Director of Waikiki Development. He was re-elected as a Trustee of the Office of Hawaiian Affairs in 2010. Apo would eventually rack up the largest ethics fine in Hawaii history, $25,000, after OHA paid out a $50,000 settlement over sex harassment allegations against Apo.

He is a founding member of the Native Hawaiian Hospitality Association, served as its past chairman, and was its Director of Culture & Education. He has chaired the Pacific Islanders in Communications, and is a past chair of the Historic Hawaii Foundation and the Friends of the Natatorium. He has also served on the Chaminade University Board of Regents and the board of directors for the Hawaii Visitors and Convention Bureau. He also had the honor of serving as Civilian Aide to the U.S. Secretary of the Army for West Oahu and Kauai. He continues serving the community on numerous boards and commissions.

== Travelers 3 ==
Apo is also an accomplished singer and songwriter. He is one of three founding members of the 1960s folk band The Travelers 3. The group recorded a total of four albums, from 1962 to 1965, their first three for Elektra Records, then, their fourth with Capitol Records. The trio's last bassist, Joe Lamanno, subsequently joined The Association.

He has since performed as a soloist, as well as in several other bands.
