= Barbara Marshall =

American journalist

Chair of the Honolulu City Council
- In office January 2, 2007 – November 12, 2008
- Preceded by: Donovan Dela Cruz
- Succeeded by: Todd K. Apo

Honolulu City Council member, District III
- In office January 2003 – February 22, 2009
- Preceded by: Steve Holmes
- Succeeded by: Ikaika Anderson

Personal details
- Born: Barbara Novak Marshall; March 5, 1944 Berwyn, Illinois, U.S.
- Died: February 22, 2009 (aged 64) Orange County, California, U.S.
- Spouse: Cliff Ziems
- Children: Joe Marshall
- Education: BS, Radio-TV Journalism
- Alma mater: University of Illinois
- Occupation: Television Journalist
- Website: http://www.BarbaraMarshall.org

Barbara Novak Marshall (March 5, 1944 – February 22, 2009) was an American television broadcast journalist and politician. She was elected three times to the Honolulu City Council in Honolulu, Hawaii following her retirement from broadcasting.

Marshall was known throughout Hawaii for a long career as an investigative journalist, consumer advocate, documentary filmmaker, news anchor and reporter for KHON-TV television station.

== Biography ==
Born Barbara Novak in Berwyn, Illinois she went on to become the first female graduate of the Radio and Television Journalism program at the University of Illinois in 1965. As Barbara Novak, she broke through television journalism's glass ceiling to become the first woman Radio-TV grad to anchor a regularly scheduled broadcast television news program in the United States. She rose to further prominence as Barbara Marshall in Boston, where she worked for a decade as an award-winning reporter for two Boston television stations, first for channel 56 WLVI and then for channel 4 WBZ-TV. A number of her interviews and stories were broadcast on NBC-TV network newscasts.

Marshall transported her career to Honolulu in 1979, working for 23 years as reporter, news anchor and producer for channel 2 KHON. During her tenure at KHON, Marshall initiated Action Line (a TV-consumer complaint line), live television election coverage and created the first morning news program in Hawaii. She won awards for two documentaries: One on the eruption of the Kilauea volcano, and another on the life of Challenger astronaut Ellison Onizuka.

In 2002, she won a seat on the Honolulu City Council in her first attempt at elective office. She was reelected to the council seat on September 18, 2004, and again on September 25, 2008, and was elected chairman by her peers on January 2, 2007.

== Personal ==
Marshall died on February 22, 2009, aged 64, after an eight-month battle with colon cancer. Marshall's husband, Cliff Ziems, endorsed her aide, Ikaika Anderson, to fill her city council seat; he was elected in a special election and was sworn into office on May 27, 2009.
