= Ka Wai Ola =

Newspaper in Hawaii

- Founded: February 1984; 42 years ago
- OCLC number: 8271429
- Website: https://kawaiola.news

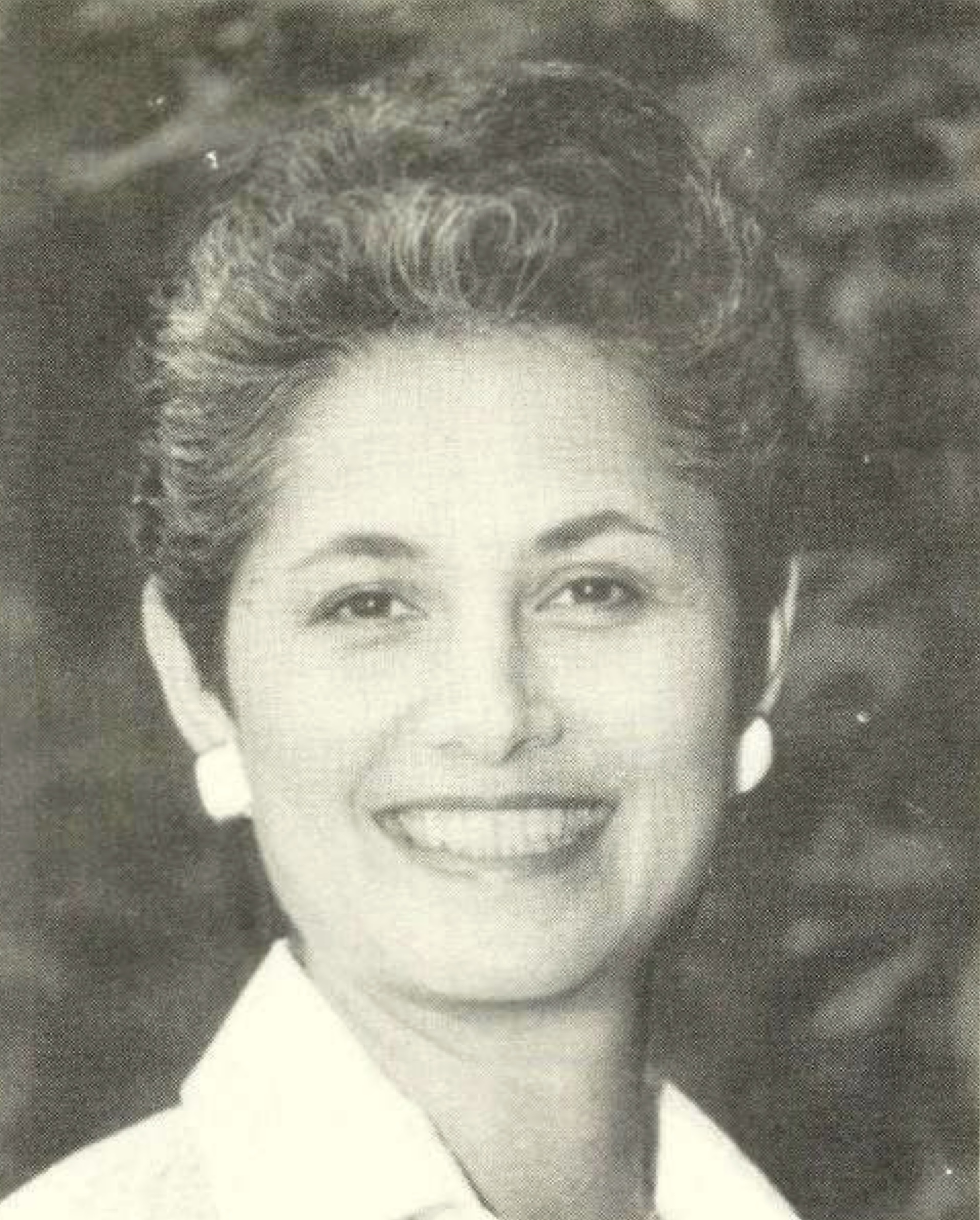
Leina'ala Ann Teruya Drummond, Ka Wai Ola photograph, October 1988

Ka Wai Ola is a Hawaii-based newspaper published monthly by the Office of Hawaiian Affairs.

The newspaper was first published in February 1984. As of 2017, the paper was distributed to over 60,000 people. It has some Hawaiian language columns.

The paper often covers Office of Hawaiian Affairs meetings.

== Awards ==
- Ka Wai Ola has received nine awards from the Native American Journalists Association, seven in 2020, and two in 2019.

== See also ==
- Hawaii Tribune-Herald
- Honolulu Star-Advertiser
