= 2026 Office of Hawaiian Affairs election =

- November 3, 2026

5 of 9 seats on the Office of Hawaiian Affairs
| | First party | Second party | Third party |
|---|---|---|---|
| Party | Independent | Democratic | Republican |
| Seats before | 4 | 3 | 2 |

The 2026 Office of Hawaiian Affairs election was held on November 3, 2026 to elect five of nine seats on the Office of Hawaiian Affairs. Primary elections were held on August 8. The election is officially nonpartisan, but candidates may affiliate with a political party.

== At-large trustee (3 seats) ==
From the primary election, six candidates advanced to the general election, and three of them were elected to office.

=== Candidates ===
==== Advanced to general ====
- Adrian Akina (Independent), educator
- Ikaika Anderson (Democratic), former Honolulu City Councilmember (2009–2021) and candidate for lieutenant governor in 2022
- Kanekoa Crabbe (Independent), fisherman and boat builder
- Brickwood Galuteria (Democratic), incumbent board member
- Keoni Souza (Republican), incumbent board member
- John Waihee IV (Independent), incumbent board member

==== Eliminated in primary ====
- Karl Veto Baker (Independent), mortgage banker
- Shelby Billionaire (Independent), laborer and We the People Party nominee for U.S. Senate in 2024
- Michelle Costello (Independent), management consultant
- Jackie Kahookele Burke (Independent), planner, designer and artist
- Brendon Kalei'aina Lee (Independent), former board member (2019–2023)
- Clifford Kauaula (Independent), social services manager
- Philip Martin (Independent), system administrator
- R. Kunani Nihipali (Independent), retired police officer
- Kalena Parish (Independent), musician

=== Primary election ===
==== Results ====
Nonpartisan primary results
| Candidate | Votes | % |
|---|---|---|
| Brickwood Galuteria (incumbent) | 74,796 | 15.12 |
| John Waihee IV (incumbent) | 70,761 | 14.30 |
| Ikaika Anderson | 58,918 | 11.91 |
| Keoni Souza (incumbent) | 58,000 | 11.72 |
| Adrian Akina | 44,038 | 8.90 |
| Kanekoa Crabbe | 30,308 | 6.13 |
| Kalena Parish | 28,309 | 5.72 |
| Brendon Kalei'aina Lee | 23,497 | 4.75 |
| Michelle Costello | 22,754 | 4.60 |
| Karl Veto Baker | 19,976 | 4.04 |
| R. Kunani Nihipali | 19,194 | 3.88 |
| Jackie Kahookele Burke | 14,488 | 2.93 |
| Shelby Billionaire | 11,458 | 2.32 |
| Philip Martin | 9,126 | 1.84 |
| Clifford Kauaula | 9,077 | 1.83 |
| Total votes | 494,700 | 100.00 |

=== General election ===
==== Results ====
General election results
| Candidate | Votes | % |
|---|---|---|
| Keoni Souza (incumbent) | 125,084 | 17.83 |
| Ikaika Anderson | 124,370 | 17.73 |
| Brickwood Galuteria (incumbent) | 118,375 | 16.88 |
| John Waihee IV (incumbent) | 117,319 | 16.73 |
| Adrian (Kealii) Akina | 116,330 | 16.59 |
| Kanekoa (Koa) Crabbe | 99,884 | 14.24 |
| Total votes | 701,362 | 100.00 |

== Maui resident trustee ==
=== Candidates ===
==== Advanced to general ====
- Carmen Hulu Lindsey (Independent), incumbent board member
- Ke'eaumoku Kapu (Independent), cultural programs coordinator and candidate for this district in 2018

=== General election ===
==== Results ====
General election results
| Candidate | Votes | % |
|---|---|---|
| Carmen Hulu Lindsey (incumbent) | 115,168 | 51.2 |
| Ke'eaumoku Kapu | 109,717 | 48.8 |
| Total votes | 224,885 | 100.00 |

== Oahu resident trustee ==
=== Candidates ===
==== Advanced to general ====
- Kalei Akaka (Democratic), incumbent board member
- Hinaleimoana Wong (Independent), educator

=== General election ===
==== Results ====
General election results
| Candidate | Votes | % |
|---|---|---|
| Kalei Akaka (incumbent) | 147,607 | 54.8 |
| Hinaleimoana Wong (Hina) | 121,787 | 45.2 |
| Total votes | 269,394 | 100.00 |
