= Kalei Akaka =

American politician

Member of the Office of Hawaiian Affairs Board of Trustees
- Incumbent
- Assumed office December 10, 2018
- Preceded by: Peter Apo
- Constituency: Oʻahu

Personal details
- Born: Kaleihikina Anastasia Akaka; 1982 or 1983 (age 43–44)
- Party: Democratic
- Spouse: Tyler Akaka
- Relatives: Daniel Akaka (grandfather)
- Education: Chaminade University (BA)

Kaleihikina Anastasia (Kalei) Akaka is a Native Hawaiian politician serving as the Oʻahu Resident Trustee since 2018 for the Office of Hawaiian Affairs (OHA). She is the granddaughter of the late U.S. Senator Daniel K. Akaka. Akaka was first elected to the OHA Board of Trustees in 2018.

In the 2022 primary election, she secured a second term outright by receiving over 50% of the vote, a margin that precluded a general election contest under Hawaii election law. She was reelected in 2026 after being challenged for the seat by Hinaleimoana Wong-Kalu.

== Early life and education ==
Akaka was raised in Kailua-Kona on the island of Hawaiʻi. She attended Chaminade University of Honolulu, graduating in 2004 with a Bachelor of Arts in Communications and Marketing. Her paternal lineage includes a long history of participation in Hawaiʻi's Democratic party and federal representation.

== Career ==
Prior to her elective office, Akaka was a legislative aide in the Hawaiʻi State Legislature, working for Representative Gilbert Keith-Agaran and Senator Brian Taniguchi. Her professional background also includes work in public relations and marketing. She unsuccessfully sought election to the Hawaiʻi House of Representatives in 2012 and 2014, losing to Nicole Lowen.

=== Office of Hawaiian Affairs (2018–Present) ===
Akaka took office as Oʻahu Resident Trustee starting in 2018. During her tenure, she has served as vice-chair of the Beneficiary Advocacy and Empowerment (BAE) committee. This committee is responsible for OHA's legislative agenda and advocacy regarding Native Hawaiian rights and land assets. In 2022, Akaka was one of several OHA incumbents to win their seats in the primary round, a result attributed to high name recognition and support from organized labor.
