= Native Hawaiians =

Indigenous Polynesian people of Hawaii

Kānaka Maoli, Hawaiʻi Maoli
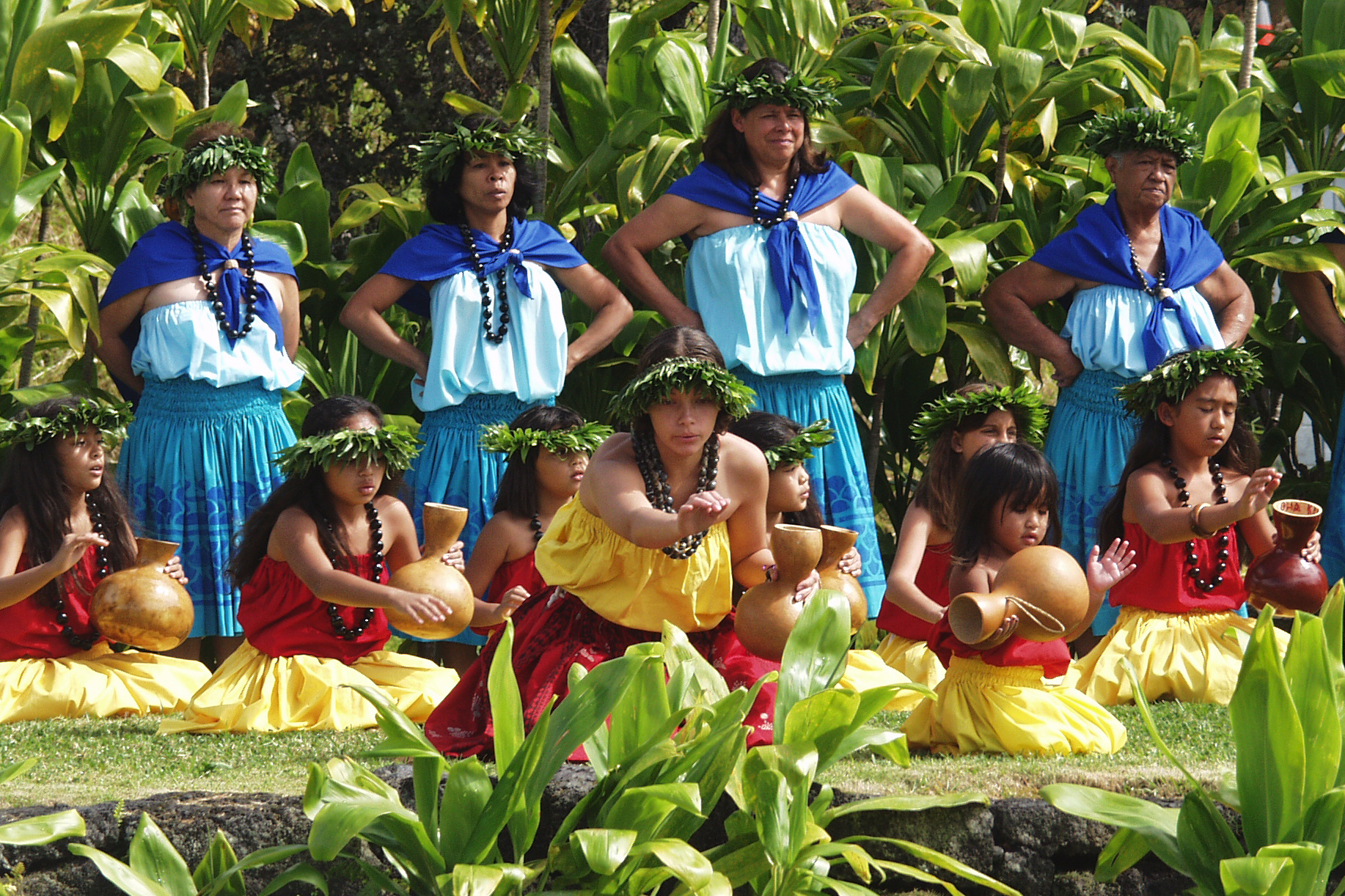
- Native Hawaiians performing a hula (2005)

Total population
- 640,442 (2020 census)

Regions with significant populations
- United States: 640,442
- Canada: 3,300
- New Zealand: 699
- Australia: 300

Languages
- English; Hawaiian; Hawaiʻi Sign Language (HSL); Hawaiian Pidgin

Religion
- Christianity; Hawaiian religion

Related ethnic groups
- other Polynesians, other Pacific Islanders

Native Hawaiians (also known as Indigenous Hawaiians, Kānaka Maoli, Aboriginal Hawaiians, or simply Hawaiians; Hawaiian: kānaka, kānaka ʻōiwi, Kānaka Maoli, and Hawaiʻi maoli) are the Indigenous Polynesian people of the Hawaiian Islands.

Hawaiʻi was settled at least 800 years ago by Polynesians who sailed in two voyages, one from the Marquesas, and the next from Tahiti (or the Hawaiian name Kahiki), both around 1000-1200 CE. The settlers gradually became detached from their homeland and developed a distinct Hawaiian culture and identity in their new home. They created new religious and cultural structures, in response to their new circumstances and to pass knowledge from one generation to the next. Hence, the Hawaiian religion focuses on ways to live and relate to the land and instills a sense of community. Though a unique civilization, they have retained synergy with other Polynesian peoples across the Pacific. The Hawaiian language, for example, shares many similarities with other Polynesian languages.

The Hawaiian Kingdom was formed in 1795, when Kamehameha the Great, of the then-independent island of Hawaiʻi, conquered the independent islands of Oʻahu, Maui, Molokaʻi, and Lānaʻi to form the kingdom. In 1810, Kauaʻi and Niʻihau joined the Kingdom, the last inhabited islands to do so. The Kingdom received many immigrants from the United States and Asia. The Hawaiian sovereignty movement seeks autonomy or independence for Hawaiʻi.

In the 2010 U.S. census, people with Native Hawaiian ancestry were reported to be residents in all 50 of the U.S. states, as well as Washington, D.C., and Puerto Rico. Within the United States in 2010, 540,013 residents reported Native Hawaiian or Other Pacific Islander ancestry alone, of which 135,422 lived in Hawaii. In the United States overall, 1.2 million people identified as Native Hawaiian and Other Pacific Islander, either alone or in combination with one or more other races. The Native Hawaiian and Other Pacific Islander population was one of the fastest-growing groups between 2000 and 2010.

== History ==
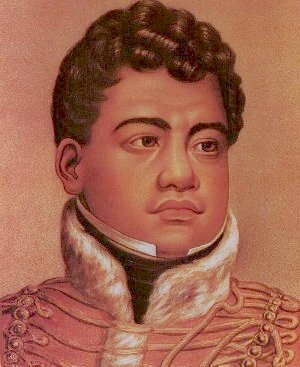
King Kamehameha II

The history of Kānaka Maoli, like the history of Hawaii, is commonly broken into four major periods:

- the pre-unification period (before c. 1800)
- the unified monarchy and republic period (c. 1800 to 1898)
- the U.S. territorial period (1898 to 1959)
- the U.S. statehood period (1959 to present)

=== Origins ===
One theory is that the first Polynesians arrived in Hawaiʻi in the 3rd century from the Marquesas by travelling in groups of waka, and were followed by Tahitians in AD 1300, who conquered the original inhabitants. Another is that a single, extended period of settlement populated the islands. Evidence for Tahitian conquest include the legends of Hawaiʻiloa and the navigator-priest Paʻao, who is said to have made a voyage between Hawaiʻi and the island of "Kahiki" (Tahiti) and introduced many customs. Early historians, such as Abraham Fornander and Martha Beckwith, subscribed to this Tahitian invasion theory, but later historians, such as Patrick Kirch, do not mention it. King Kalākaua claimed that Paʻao was from Sāmoa.

Some writers claim that earlier settlers in Hawaiʻi were forced into remote valleys by newer arrivals. They claim that stories about the Menehune, little people who built heiau and fishponds, prove the existence of ancient peoples who settled the islands before the Hawaiians, although similar stories exist throughout Polynesia.

== Demographics ==
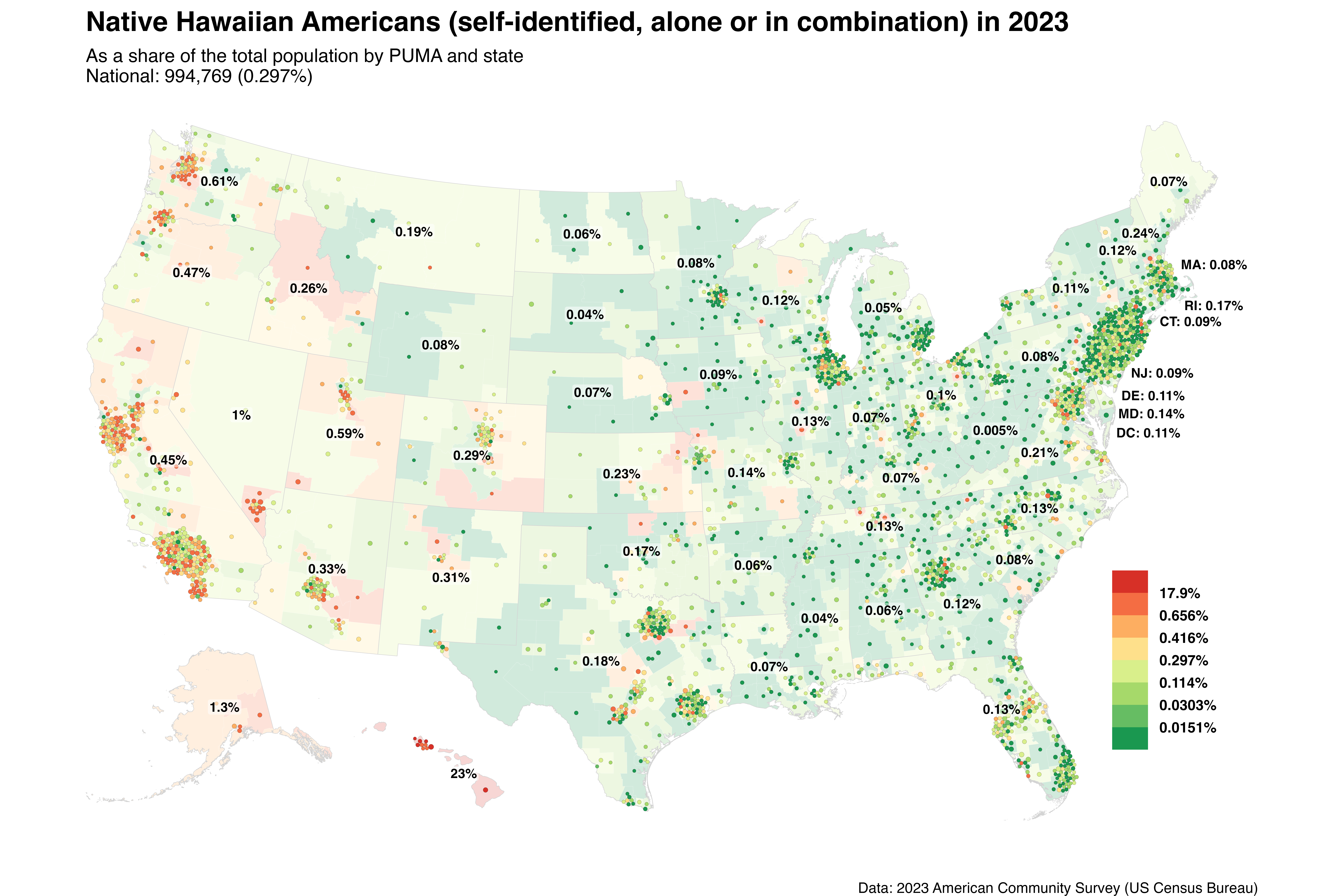
Native Hawaiian Americans

At the time of Captain Cook's arrival in 1778, the population is estimated to have been between 250,000 and 800,000. This was the peak of the Native Hawaiian population. During the first century after contact, Kānaka Maoli were nearly wiped out by diseases brought by immigrants and visitors. Kānaka Maoli had no resistance to smallpox, measles, or whooping cough, among others. These diseases were similarly catastrophic to indigenous populations in the Americas.

The current 293,000 include dual lineage Native Hawaiian and mixed lineage/multi-racial people. This was the highest number of any Kānaka Maoli living on the island until 2014, a period of almost 226 years. This long spread was marked by an initial die-off of 1-in-17, which would gradually increase to almost 8–10 dying from contact to the low point in 1950.

The 1900 U.S. census identified 37,656 residents of full or partial Native Hawaiian ancestry. The 2000 U.S. census identified 283,430 residents of Native Hawaiian or Pacific Islander ancestry, showing a steady growth trend over the century.

=== Diaspora ===
Some Hawaiians left the islands during the period of the Hawaiian Kingdom. For example, Harry Maitey became the first Hawaiian in Prussia.

Kiha Kaʻawa, born at Palawai, Lānaʻi, was adopted as a young man by Sandwich Islands Mormon Missionary President George Nebeker and emigrated with King Lunalilo's permission to the mainland US, where in 1873 he was the first native Hawaiian to become a US citizen. Kiha Kaʻawa Nebeker stayed in the US until his death December 26, 1931.

The Native Hawaiian population has increased outside the state of Hawaiʻi, with states such as California and Washington experiencing dramatic increases in total population. Due to a notable Hawaiian presence in Las Vegas, the city is sometimes called the "Ninth Island" in reference to the eight islands of Hawaiʻi.

== Culture and arts ==
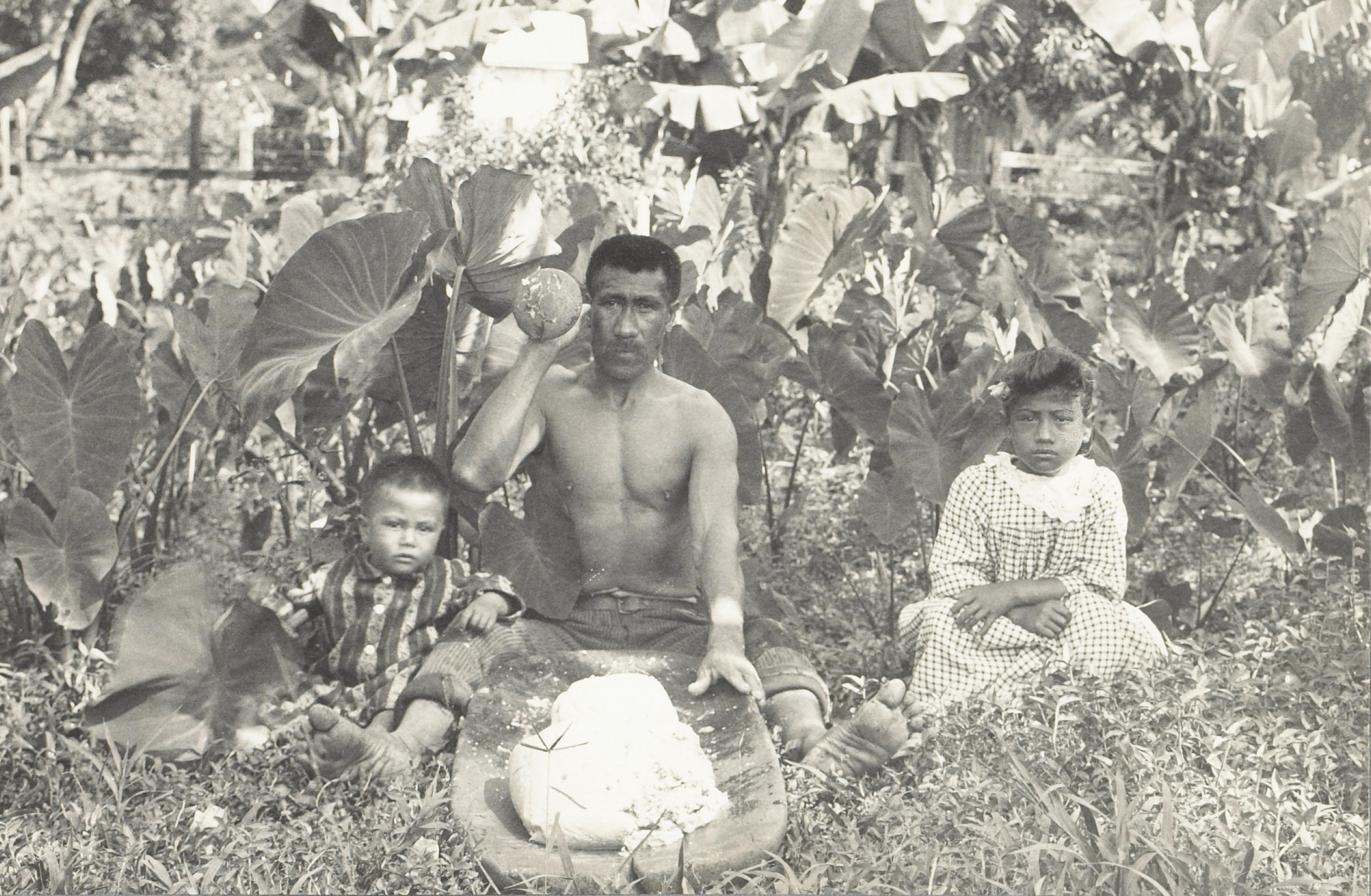
Hawaiian man with his two children, c. 1890

Several cultural preservation societies and organizations were established. The largest is the Bernice Pauahi Bishop Museum, established in 1889 and designated as the Hawaiʻi State Museum of Natural and Cultural History. The museum houses the largest collection of native Hawaiian artifacts, documents, and other information. The museum has links with major colleges and universities throughout the world to facilitate research.

The Polynesian Voyaging Society reignited interest in Polynesian sailing techniques, both in ship construction and in instrument-free navigation. The Society built multiple double-hulled canoes, beginning with Hōkūleʻa and followed by Makaliʻi, Alingano Maisu, and Moʻokiha O Piʻilani. The canoes and their worldwide voyages contributed to the renewal and appreciation of Hawaiian culture.

=== Religion and society ===
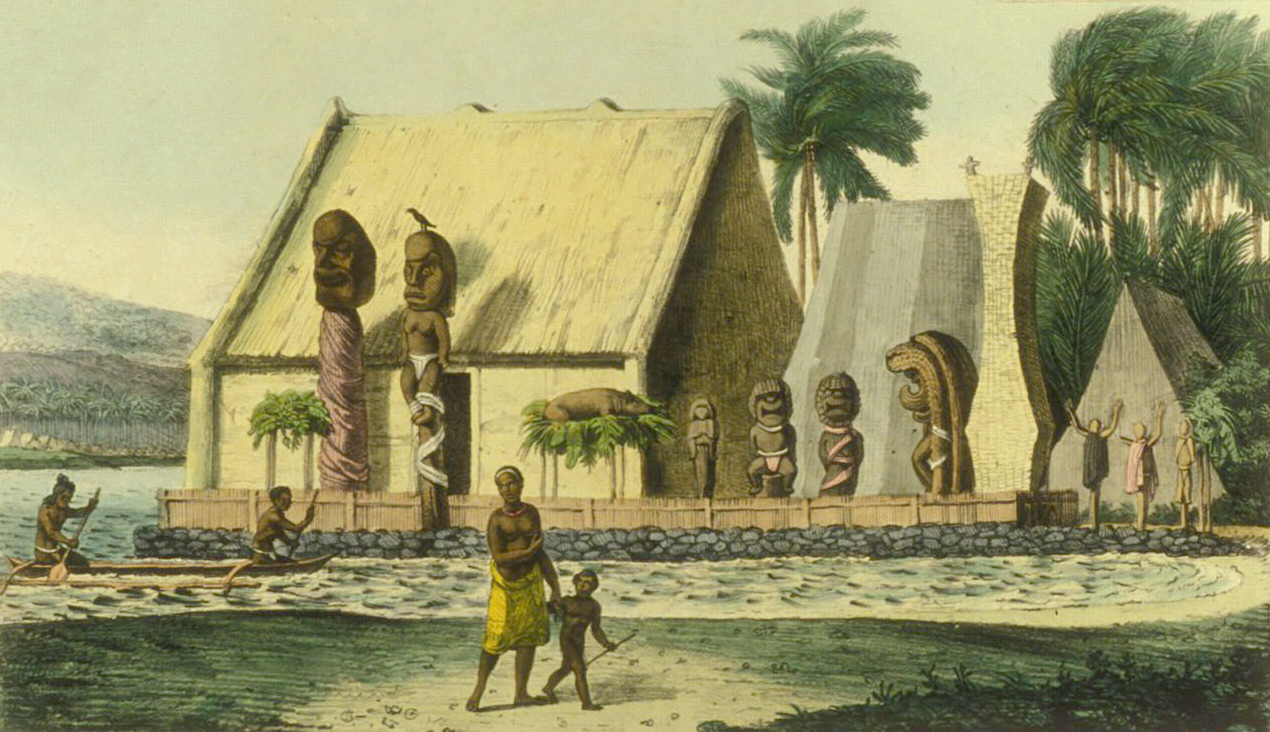
A depiction of a royal heiau (Hawaiian temple) at Kealakekua Bay, c. 1816

Native Hawaiian culture grew from their Polynesian roots, creating a local religion and cultural practices. This new worship centered on the ideas of land (ʻāina) and family (ʻohana). Land became a sacred part of life and family. Hawaiian religion is polytheistic, but mostly focuses on the gods Wākea and Papahānaumoku, the mother and father of the Hawaiian Islands. Their stillborn child formed the deep roots of Hawaii, and whose second child, Hāloa, is the god from whom all Hawaiians originate.

Hawaiian culture is caste-oriented, with specific roles based on social standing. Caste roles are reflected in how land was controlled.

=== Land tenure ===
Each island was divided into moku, which were given to people of high standing and kept within the family. Each moku was split into smaller ahupuaʻa, each of which extended from the sea to the top of the nearest mountain. This was to ensure that each ahupuaʻa provided all necessary resources for survival, including hardwoods and food sources. Each ahupuaʻa was managed by managers, who were charged by the island chief to collect tributes from the residents. Splits of the ahupuaʻa were based on the level of tribute. The major subdivisions were ʻili. Each ʻili gave a tribute to the chief of the ahupuaʻa and another to the island chief. In contrast to the European system of feudalism, Hawaiian peasants were never bound to the land and were free to move as they chose.

Kānaka Maoli refer to themselves as kamaʻāina, a word meaning "people of the land", because of their connection to and stewardship of the land. It was also part of the spiritual belief system that attributes their origin to the land itself. This is reinforced by the cultivation of taro, a plant that is said to be the manifestation of Hāloa. The represents the deep roots that tether Hawaiians to the islands, as well as symbolizing the branching networks that Hawaiian people created.

=== Hula ===
Hula is one of Hawaii's best-known indigenous artforms. Traditionally, hula was a ritualistic dance performed to honor the gods and goddesses. Hula is typically categorized as either hula kahiko or hula ʻauana. Each hula tells a story via its movements and gestures.

Hula kahiko is a traditional style. Its interpretive dance is known for its grace and romantic feel. Dances are accompanied by percussion instruments and traditional chanting. The traditional instruments include the pahu hula, kilu or puniu, ipu, hano or ʻohe hano ihu, ka, pu, oeoe, pahupahu kaʻekeʻeke, hokio, and wi. Dancers add to the effect using ʻuli, puʻili, ʻiliʻili, papahehi, and kalaʻau.

Hula ʻauana was influenced by later Western factors. It is accompanied by non-traditional musical instruments and colorful outfits. It became popularized with tourists and it is this form that is most widely practiced beyond the islands. ʻUkuleles and guitars are common.

=== Holidays ===
The Hawaiian people celebrate traditions and holidays. The most popular form of celebration in Hawaiʻi is the Lūʻau. A lūʻau is a traditional Hawaiian banquet, commonly featuring foods such as poi, poke, lomi-lomi salmon, kālua pig, haupia, and entertainment such as ʻukulele music and hula.

One of the most important holidays is Prince Kūhiō Day. Celebrated every year since 1949 on his birthday (March 26), the holiday honors Prince Jonah Kūhiō Kalanianaʻole, a Congressman who succeeded in helping Native Hawaiian families become landowners. It is celebrated with canoe races and lūʻaus across the islands. Every June 11 Kānaka Maoli celebrate King Kamehameha day. Kamehameha I was the king who unified the islands and established the Kingdom of Hawaiʻi. He was known as a fearless warrior, wise diplomat, and the most respected leader in the history of the Hawaiian monarchy. The holiday is celebrated with parades and lei draping ceremonies, where Kānaka Maoli bring lei (flower necklaces) to King Kamehameha statues located across the islands and drape them from his cast bronze arms and neck to honor his contributions to the people of Hawaiʻi.

== Hawaiian cultural revival ==
Native Hawaiian culture underwent a renaissance beginning in the 1970s. It was in part triggered by the 1978 Hawaiʻi State Constitutional Convention, held 200 years after the arrival of Captain Cook. At the convention, state government committed itself to the study and preservation of Hawaiian culture, history, and language.

Hawaiian culture was introduced into Hawaii's public schools, teaching Hawaiian art, lifestyle, geography, hula, and Hawaiian language. Intermediate and high schools were mandated to teach Hawaiian history to all their students.

Many aspects of Hawaiian culture were commercialized to appeal to visitors from around the world. This includes hula, use of the word "Aloha", lei, and the assimilation of Hawaiian culture into non-native lifestyles. This has provided significant financial support for cultural practices, while emphasizing aspects that have popular appeal over those that respect tradition.

Statutes and charter amendments were passed acknowledging a policy of preference for Hawaiian place and street names. For example, with the closure of Barbers Point Naval Air Station in the 1990s, the region formerly occupied by the base was renamed Kalaeloa.

=== Activism ===
While Native Hawaiian protest has a long history, beginning just after the overthrow of the Hawaiian Kingdom, many notable protests came during or after the Hawaiian cultural revival. These include the Kalama Valley protests, the Waiāhole-Waikāne struggle, the Kahoʻolawe Island protests, and protests over the presence and management of astronomical observatories atop Hawaii's mountains, most notably the Thirty Meter Telescope protests.

== Hawaiian language ==
=== Hawaiian traditional language ===
The Hawaiian language (or ʻŌlelo Hawaiʻi) was once the language of native Hawaiian people; today, Kānaka Maoli predominantly speak English. A major factor for this change was an 1896 law that required that English "be the only medium and basis of instruction in all public and private schools". This law excluded the Hawaiian language from schools. In spite of this, some Kānaka Maoli (as well as non-Kānaka Maoli) learned ʻŌlelo Hawaiʻi. As with other Hawaiʻi locals, Kānaka Maoli typically speak Hawaiian Creole English (referred to locally as Pidgin) in daily life. Pidgin is a creole that developed during the plantation era in the late nineteenth and early twentieth centuries, mixing words and diction from the various ethnic groups living in Hawaiʻi then.

ʻŌlelo Hawaiʻi later became an official language of the State of Hawaiʻi, alongside English. The state enacted a program of cultural preservation in 1978. Programs included Hawaiian language immersion schools, and a Hawaiian language department at the University of Hawaiʻi at Mānoa. Ever since, Hawaiian language fluency has climbed among all races.

In 2006, the University of Hawaiʻi at Hilo established a masters program in Hawaiian, and in 2006, a Ph.D. program. It was the first doctoral program established for the study of any pre-contact language in the United States.

Hawaiian is the primary language of the residents of Niʻihau.

=== Hawaiʻi Sign Language ===
Alongside ʻŌlelo Hawaiʻi, some Kānaka Maoli used the little-studied Hawaiʻi Sign Language.

== Education ==
In Hawaiʻi, the public school system is operated by the Hawaiʻi State Department of Education rather than local school districts. Under the administration of Governor Benjamin J. Cayetano from 1994 to 2002, the state's educational system established Hawaiian language immersion schools. In these schools, all courses are taught in the Hawaiian language and incorporate Hawaiian subject matter. These schools are not exclusive to native Hawaiians.

Kānaka Maoli are eligible for an education from Kamehameha Schools (KS), established through the last will and testament of Bernice Pauahi Bishop of the Kamehameha Dynasty. The largest and wealthiest private school system in the United States, KS was intended to benefit orphans and the needy, with preference given to Kānaka Maoli. The schools educate thousands of children of native Hawaiian children ancestry and offers summer and off-campus programs not restricted by ancestry. KS practice of accepting primarily gifted students, has been controversial in the native Hawaiian community. Many families feel that gifted students could excel anywhere, and that the Hawaiian community would be better served by educating disadvantaged children to help them become responsible community contributors.

Many Kānaka Maoli attend public schools or other private schools.

== Office of Hawaiian Affairs ==
The Office of Hawaiian Affairs (OHA) is a self-governing corporate body of the State of Hawaii created by the 1978 Hawaii State Constitutional Convention. It is often described as the fourth branch of government in Hawaiʻi.

OHA's mandate is to advance the education, health, housing and economics of (Kānaka Maoli) Native Hawaiians. OHA conducts research and advocacy to shape public policies. OHA works with communities to share information and build public support for Hawaiian issues.

OHA was given control over certain public lands, and acquired other land-holdings for the provision of housing, supporting agriculture, and supporting cultural institutions. The lands initially given to OHA were originally crown lands of the Kingdom of Hawaiʻi, which had gone through various forms of public ownership since the overthrow of the Hawaiian Kingdom.

OHA is a semi-autonomous government body administered by a nine-member board of trustees, elected by the people of the State of Hawaiʻi through popular suffrage. OHA manages more than $600 million worth of assets on behalf of Native Hawaiians. Although OHA is independent from the governor's office and other state departments, the state has significant control over the organization's general funding from public land trust revenues.

== Federal developments ==
Ka Hae Hawaiʻi (Official Flag of the Kingdom of Hawaiʻi & State of Hawaiʻi)

=== United States annexation ===
In 1893, during the Hawaiian rebellions of 1887–1895 and after the ascension of Queen Liliʻuokalani to the Hawaiian Throne in 1891, Sanford Dole created the "Committee of Safety", who overthrew the monarchy. This was in part due to the Queen's rejection of the 1887 Constitution, which severely limited her authority. This diminished traditional governance and installed a US-backed, plantation-led government. One reason for the overthrow was over Kalākaua's unwillingness to sign the amended Treaty of Reciprocity that would have damaged Hawaiian trade, and opened up part of Oʻahu for the Pearl Harbor military base.

The event was challenged by Grover Cleveland, but was eventually supported by President William McKinley in his Manifest Destiny plan, which harmed indigenous peoples in the continental United States and Hawaiʻi. The change left Kānaka Maoli as the only major indigenous group with no "nation-to-nation" negotiation status and without any degree of self determination.

=== Native American Programs Act ===
In 1974, the Native American Programs Act was amended to include Kānaka Maoli. This paved the way for Kānaka Maoli to become eligible for some federal assistance programs originally intended for continental Native Americans. Today, Title 45 CFR Part 1336.62 defines a Native Hawaiian as "an individual any of whose ancestors were natives of the area which consists of the Hawaiian Islands prior to 1778".

=== United States apology resolution ===
On November 23, 1993, U.S. President Bill Clinton signed United States Public Law 103–150, also known as the Apology Resolution, which had previously passed Congress. This resolution "apologizes to Kānaka Maoli on behalf of the people of the United States for the overthrow of the Kingdom of Hawaiʻi".

=== Native Hawaiian Government Reorganization Act of 2009 ===
In 2009, the Congressional delegation of the State of Hawaiʻi introduced the Native Hawaiian Federal Recognition Bill (Akaka bill), an attempt to recognize and form a Native Hawaiian government entity to negotiate with state and federal governments. The bill would establish, for the first time, a formal political and legal relationship between a Native Hawaiian entity and the US government. Proponents consider the legislation to be an acknowledgement and partial correction of past injustices. They included Hawaii's Congressional delegation, as well as former Governor Linda Lingle. Opponents include the U.S. Commission on Civil Rights (who doubted the constitutionality of creating a race-based government), libertarian activists (who challenged the accuracy of claims of injustice), and other Native Hawaiian sovereignty activists (who claimed that the legislation would prevent complete independence from the United States).

A Ward Research poll commissioned in 2003 by the Office of Hawaiian Affairs reported that "Eighty-six percent of the 303 Hawaiian residents polled by Ward Research said 'yes.' Only 7 percent said 'no,' with 6 percent unsure ... Of the 301 non-Hawaiians polled, almost eight in 10 (78 percent) supported federal recognition, 16 percent opposed it, with 6 percent unsure." A Zogby International poll commissioned in 2009 by the Grassroot Institute of Hawaii indicated that a plurality (39%) of Hawaiʻi residents opposed it and that 76% indicated that they were unwilling to pay higher taxes to offset any resulting tax revenue loss due to the act.

The bill did not pass.

=== Ka Huli Ao: Center for Excellence in Native Hawaiian Law ===
In 2005, with the support of U.S. Senator Daniel Inouye, federal funding through the Native Hawaiian Education Act created the Center for Excellence in Native Hawaiian Law at UH Mānoa William S. Richardson School of Law. The program became known as Ka Huli Ao: Center for Excellence in Native Hawaiian Law.

Ka Huli Ao focuses on research, scholarship, and community outreach. Ka Huli Ao maintains a social media presence and provides law students with summer fellowships. Law school graduates are eligible to apply for post-J.D. fellowships.

=== Department of Interior Self-Governance Proposal ===
In 2016, the Department of Interior (DOI), under the direction of Secretary Sally Jewell, started the process of recognizing the Hawaiians' right to self governance and the ability for nation-to-nation negotiation status and rights. This created opposition from the Hawaiian Sovereignty movement who believed that Kānaka Maoli should not have to navigate US structures to regain sovereignty and viewed the process as incomplete. The outcome ultimately allowed nation-to-nation relationships if Kānaka Maoli created their own government and sought that relationship. The government formation process was stopped by Justice Anthony Kennedy, using his earlier precedent in Rice v. Cayetano that "ancestry was a proxy for race" in ancestry-based elections, but the voting itself was not stopped.

=== Asian American, Native Hawaiian and Pacific Islander Heritage Month ===
The United States government has permanently designated the month of May to be Asian American, Native Hawaiian and Pacific Islander Heritage Month; before 2021 it was known as Asian Pacific American Heritage Month.

=== Native Hawaiian Community Consultation Policy ===
On October 18, 2022, the Department of Interior published a press release announcing the establishment of a new policy that would require the federal government to formally consult the Native Hawaiian Community in order to "further affirm and honor the special political and trust relationship between the United States and the Native Hawaiian Community." Secretary Deb Haaland noted in the press release that the new consultation policy would assist in upholding the sovereignty and right to self-determination Native Hawaiian communities have.

In addition to bi-annual meetings between the Secretary and representatives of Native Hawaiian organizations on "matters of mutual interest", as well as mandatory training, the Consultation policy requires federal agencies to consult the Native Hawaiian Community before engaging in any actions that "have the potential to significantly affect Native Hawaiian resources, rights, or lands by correspondingly charging the Office with fully integrating the policy and practice of meaningful consultation by such Federal agencies." Its proposal explained the unique relationship Native Hawaiian have with the US government, defined as "government-to-sovereign" and recognized in 150 statutes: the unrelinquished sovereignty Native Hawaiiana have legally in the absence of a "government-to-government" relationship.

=== Violence Against Women Act ===
In December 2022, the Violence Against Women Act was amended to include Kānaka Maoli survivors of gender-based violence and Native Hawaiian organizations in grant funding.

== Notable Kānaka Maoli ==
In 1873, the first Kānaka Maoli were given permission from King Lunalilo (prior emigration of Kānaka Maoli outside of Hawaiʻi was not allowed) to permanently emigrate to the United States (Salt Lake City, Utah). They were Kiha Kaʻawa, and Kahana Pukahi, however Kahana Pukahi left the US in the later 1870's and went back to Hawaii, this remaining a subject of the Kingdom of Hawaii. Kiha kaʻawa however remained in the US and was adopted by Mormon Sandwich Islands (Hawaiian islands) Missionary President George Nebeker upon arriving to the US, thus making Kiha Kaʻawa (adopted surname Nebeker) the very first native Hawaiian to become a U.S. citizen in 1873 prior to Hawaiʻi's annexation. Kiha Kaʻawa was born November 15, 1862 in a village at Palawai, Lānaʻi Maui County, Hawaii, then moved to Lāʻie located at the Northeastern side of Oʻahu as a young boy to help develop the Mormon presence with George Nebeker and family at the present day site where the Mormon church is and the Polynesian Cultural Center is located. From Lāʻie, Kiha Kaʻawa emigrated via ship with Kahana Pukahi, the Nebekers and William King to Salt Lake City Utah. Kiha remained in Utah, married twice, and had several children largely in Salt Lake City Utah area until he died on December 26, 1931. Kiha was visited in the US by Hawaiian King Kalākaua, in Ogden Utah where the King and Kiha spoke for several hours in their native language before the King's schedule had him back on his US trip, and on a train.

== See also ==
- Culture of Hawaiʻi
- Hawaiian home land
- Hawaiian kinship
- Hawaiian sovereignty movement
- History of Hawaiʻi
- Population history of indigenous peoples of the Americas
