= Kaʻekeʻeke =

The kaʻekeʻeke is a Hawaiian idiophone consisting of a bamboo tube, usually between 0.3 and 1.0 meters. The kaʻekeʻeke is played by striking it against a mat on the ground. They are sometimes used to accompany hula.

== See also ==
- Hand percussion

== Sources ==
- Hawaiian dictionary: Hawaiian-English, English-Hawaiian. Mary Kawena Pukui, Samuel H. Elbert. University of Hawaii Press, 1986. ISBN 0-8248-0703-0, ISBN 978-0-8248-0703-0 Pg 109
