= Bill Burgess (rugby, born 1939) =

GB & England international rugby league footballer

Personal information
- Full name: William Burgess
- Born: 23 January 1939 Barrow-in-Furness, England
- Died: 11 June 2024 (aged 85)

Playing information

Rugby union
Club
Years	Team	Pld	T	G	FG	P
	Furness RUFC
	Fylde
	Total	0	0	0	0	0
Representative
Years	Team	Pld	T	G	FG	P
	Lancashire	1

Rugby league
- Position: Wing
Club
Years	Team	Pld	T	G	FG	P
1961–68	Barrow	222	179			537
1968–70	Salford	44	33	0	0	99
	Total	266	212	0	0	636
Representative
Years	Team	Pld	T	G	FG	P
1961–69	Lancashire	11	10	0	0	33
1962–69	England	3	3	0	0	9
1962–69	Great Britain	14	8	0	0	24
- Father: Bill Burgess Sr

William Burgess (23 January 1939 – 11 June 2024) was an English rugby union and professional rugby league footballer who played in the 1960s and 1970s. He played representative level rugby union (RU) for Lancashire, and at club level for Furness RUFC, and Fylde, and representative level rugby league (RL) for Great Britain, England and Lancashire, and at club level for Barrow and Salford, as a wing.

== Background ==
Burgess' birth was registered in Barrow-in-Furness district, Lancashire, England. He is the son of the rugby league footballer Bill Burgess.

== Playing career ==
=== Barrow ===
Burgess began his career in rugby union with Fylde RFC before switching to rugby league in 1961, signing for Barrow.

He played in Barrow's 12–17 defeat by Featherstone Rovers in the 1966–67 Challenge Cup Final during the 1966–67 season at Wembley Stadium, London on Saturday 13 May 1967,

Burgess is third in Barrow's all time try scorers list with 179-tries.

=== Salford ===
In December 1968, Burgess was transferred to Salford for a fee of £6,000.

He played in Salford's 6–11 defeat by Castleford in the 1968–69 Challenge Cup Final during the 1968–69 season at Wembley Stadium, London on Saturday 17 May 1969.

=== Representative honours ===
Burgess won caps for England (RL) while at Barrow in 1962 against France, in 1969 against Wales, and France, and won caps for Great Britain (RL) while at Barrow in 1962 against France, in 1963 against Australia, in 1965 against New Zealand (2 matches), in 1966 against France, Australia (3 matches), and New Zealand (2 matches), in 1967 against France, and Australia, in 1968 against France, and while at Salford in 1969 against France.

Burgess won a cap for Lancashire (RU) while at Fylde, and won caps for Lancashire (RL) while at Barrow.

== Honoured at Barrow Raiders ==
Burgess is a Barrow Raiders Hall of Fame inductee.
