= Rice v. Cayetano =

- Supreme Court of the United States

Argued October 6, 1999 Decided February 23, 2000
- Full case name: Harold F. Rice, Petitioner v. Benjamin J. Cayetano, Governor of Hawaii
- Citations: 528 U.S. 495 (more) 120 S. Ct. 1044; 145 L. Ed. 2d 1007; 2000 U.S. LEXIS 1538; 68 U.S.L.W. 4138; 2000 Cal. Daily Op. Service 1341; 2000 Daily Journal DAR 1881; 2000 Colo. J. C.A.R. 898; 13 Fla. L. Weekly Fed. S 105

Case history
- Prior: Injunction denied, 941 F. Supp. 1529 (D. Haw. 1996); summary judgment granted for defendant, 963 F. Supp. 1547 (D. Haw. 1997); affirmed, 146 F.3d 1075 (9th Cir. 1998); cert. granted, 526 U.S. 1016 (1999).
- Subsequent: Remanded, 208 F.3d 1102 (9th Cir. 2000).

Holding
- Hawaii's denial of the right to vote in OHA trustee elections based on ancestry violates the Fifteenth Amendment.

Court membership
- Chief Justice William Rehnquist Associate Justices John P. Stevens · Sandra Day O'Connor; Antonin Scalia · Anthony Kennedy; David Souter · Clarence Thomas; Ruth Bader Ginsburg · Stephen Breyer

Case opinions
- Majority: Kennedy, joined by Rehnquist, O'Connor, Scalia, Thomas
- Concurrence: Breyer (in result), joined by Souter
- Dissent: Stevens, joined by Ginsburg (Part II)
- Dissent: Ginsburg

Laws applied
- U.S. Const. amend. XV

Rice v. Cayetano, 528 U.S. 495 (2000), was a case filed in 1996 by Big Island rancher Harold "Freddy" Rice against the state of Hawaii and argued before the United States Supreme Court. In 2000, the Court ruled that the state could not restrict eligibility to vote in elections for the Board of Trustees of the Office of Hawaiian Affairs to persons of Native Hawaiian descent.

Rice was represented by the Gibson Dunn attorney (and future Solicitor General of the United States) Theodore B. Olson. John Roberts (who would later become the Chief Justice of the United States) argued for Ben Cayetano, the governor of Hawaii at the time. Deputy Solicitor General Edwin S. Kneedler represented the United States government as amicus curiae in support of the Hawaii law's constitutionality.

The February 2000 court ruling in Rice v. Cayetano encouraged Hawaiian sovereignty opponents to file a similar lawsuit, Arakaki v. State of Hawai‘i, months later. As the Rice case resulted in non-Hawaiians being allowed to vote in OHA elections, the Arakaki case resulted in non-Hawaiians being allowed to stand as candidates in OHA elections.

== Background ==
Beginning in 1978, Hawaii held statewide elections for the trustees of the Office of Hawaiian Affairs (OHA), an agency charged with disbursing particular funds and benefits to those who may be classified as "Native Hawaiians" ("any descendant of not less than one-half part of the races inhabiting the Hawaiian Islands previous to 1778"), or those who may be classified simply as "Hawaiian" ("any descendant[s] of the aboriginal peoples inhabiting the Hawaiian islands ... in 1778, and which peoples thereafter have continued to reside in Hawaii"). By law, only Native Hawaiians or Hawaiians could vote for, or be elected to, this Board of Trustees.

Harold F. Rice was a rancher of European descent whose family had resided in Hawaii since the mid-19th century. In March 1996, he attempted to register to vote for the OHA trustees. Where that application asked for confirmation that "I am also Hawaiian and desire to register to vote in OHA elections," Rice scratched out the words "am also Hawaiian and" and checked "Yes." Denied eligibility because he was not Hawaiian, Rice sued under the 14th and 15th Amendments to the U.S. Constitution.

The District Court for the State of Hawaii ruled against Rice, due to its conclusion (as summarized by the 9th Circuit Court of Appeals) that "the method of electing OHA trustees meets constitutional standards for the essential reason that the restriction on the right to vote is not based on race, but upon recognition of the unique status of native Hawaiians that bears a rational connection to Hawaii's trust obligations." The District Court held that the OHA does not sufficiently resemble a typical government bureau, with governmental powers, and that it is "carefully constrained by its overall purpose to work for the betterment of Hawaiians."

The 9th Circuit Court of Appeals also denied Rice's claim. For one thing, Rice contended that the legal status of an eligible voter is contingent solely upon race, and that Hawaii's contention that such status is a political designation, rather than a racial one, is an obvious effort to circumvent the Constitution with semantics. The Court of Appeals agreed that it might indeed be the case that the political designation is a racial designation under the state's statute, yet "the constitutionality of the racial classification that underlies the trusts and OHA is not challenged in this case. This means that we must accept the trust and their administrative structure as we find them, and assume that both are lawful." Because Rice had not challenged the OHA's very existence, which is predicated on a racial classification, the Court could assume that "the state may rationally conclude that Hawaiians, being the group to whom trust obligations run and to whom OHA trustees owe a duty of loyalty, should be the group to decide who the trustees ought to be." Thus, despite an apparent racial classification for eligibility to vote, within the context of the OHA's creation and mandate, the classification is actually "not primarily racial, but legal or political."

Furthermore, the Court of Appeals decided that the OHA trustee election was a "special purpose election" such as that upheld in Salyer Land Co. v. Tulare Water District (1973). In that case, the election for directors of a certain "special purpose water district" was limited to landowners in that district. The weight of a landowners vote was proportional to the amount of land that was owned, and thus seemed to contradict the 14th Amendment's Equal Protection clause. The Court held that because these landowners were disproportionately affected by the policies of the water district directors, and that such directors existed for a "limited purpose" and exhibited a "lack of normal governmental authority," the districts did not violate the Constitution when they denied a vote to those who did not own land in the district, and granted votes proportionally to the amount of land owned. The elections for the OHA Board of Trustees is similar to that of the water district directors, in that "the vote is for the limited purpose of electing trustees who have no governmental powers and perform no governmental purposes." Also, because Hawaiians, as defined by statute, are those disproportionately affected by the OHA, the vote for its trustees may be limited to them. Thus this exception to the 14th Amendment was used to justify the Hawaiian voting scheme under objections based on the 15th Amendment.

Finally, the Court of Appeals concluded that "the voting restriction for trustees is rooted in historical concern for the Hawaiian race ... carried through statehood when Hawaii acknowledged a trust obligation toward native Hawaiians ... and on to 1993, when Congress passed a Joint Resolution 'apologiz[ing] to Native Hawaiians on behalf of the people of the United States for the overthrow of the Kingdom of Hawaii ... and the deprivation of the rights of Native Hawaiians to self-determination'." Thus the 9th circuit held that native Hawaiians were entitled to "special treatment" much like the special treatment accorded Native American Indians in Morton v. Mancari, where "preferential treatment that is grounded in the government's unique obligation toward Indians is a political rather than a racial classification, even though racial criteria may be used in defining eligibility."

Rice appealed to the Supreme Court. There, he would argue that the eligibility requirements subverted the original intended purpose of the public lands as written in the Annexation and Organic Acts, both of which granted subsequent benefits to all "inhabitants" of Hawaii, regardless of race. Therefore, he claimed, the elections do not qualify as "special purpose" under Salyer, nor does the eligibility requirement denote a political rather than racial classification. Finally, he claimed that the protection under Morton v. Mancari was inappropriate. The Petitioner would deny that there is any "special relationship" at all, for there is no "former sovereign" or "historical relationship" clause in the Constitution, and the analogy with Indian tribes thus has no legal standing.

The State of Hawaii disagreed. They claimed that native Hawaiian people have a "special relationship" with the United States, indeed a sort of semi-sovereign status, analogous to that of native Indian tribes, which affords them a large measure of self-determination. They would seek to demonstrate that this status had been legitimized repeatedly by Congress, though it had never been made explicit by treaty or codified in the U.S. Constitution.

The Kingdom of Hawaii was an independent, sovereign nation from 1810 until 1893. Throughout this period, the increasing economic interests of American businessmen began to clash with the interests of the Hawaiian government. In 1887, under the threat of violence, the Kingdom's Prime Minister was compelled to resign, and a new Constitution was implemented. This heavily curtailed the administrative power of the monarchy. When Queen Liliʻuokalani took steps in 1893 to counter this imposition, she was overthrown in a coup d'état by the Committee of Safety which was composed of white businessmen, missionaries and colonists (both Hawaiian citizens and foreign nationals). The Committee set up a provisional government led by themselves, and the next year declared the existence of the Republic of Hawaii. In 1898, the Republic accepted annexation by the United States, and when President McKinley signed the Annexation and Organic Acts soon thereafter, Hawaii became a U.S. Territory. At this time, 1,800,000 acres (7,300 km^{2}) of land, formerly overseen by the crown, were ceded to the United States. The Annexation Act stipulated that all revenues and proceeds from the use of this public land would "be used solely for the benefit of the inhabitants of the Hawaiian Islands for educational and other purposes." The Organic Act similarly held that all "funds arising from the sale or lease or other disposal ... shall be applied such uses and purposes for the benefit of the inhabitants of the Territory of Hawaii."

Seeing the subsequent cultural and economic decline of Hawaii's native population, in 1920 the U.S. Congress passed the Hawaiian Homes Commission Act (HHCA), which placed 200,000 of those acres under the authority of said Commission, such that they could be leased by Native Hawaiians for token sums. A "Native Hawaiian" was defined as "any descendant of not less than one-half part of the blood of the races inhabiting the Hawaiian Islands previous to 1778." That date, 1778, is the year in which Captain Cook "discovered" the islands, and thus the date of the first known Western presence.

When Hawaii became a state in 1959, it was agreed that the state would include the HHCA in its own Constitution, including the specific definition of Native Hawaiian. In 1978 the state Constitution was amended to provide for the Office of Hawaiian Affairs (OHA), which would hold the lease on those lands not already under the purview of the HHCA. The OHA lands would be similarly held in a "trust" managed for the benefit of Native Hawaiians.

=== Petitioner's argument ===
For the Petitioner, the relevant history of Hawaii begins with the Annexation Resolution, not in the previous era of sovereignty. Claims of sovereignty based upon the status or political standing of Natives prior to the 1893 coup are both mistaken and irrelevant. The Petitioner's Brief notes that at the time of their transfer, "these 'public lands' were held by the Republic of Hawaii free and clear of any encumbrances or trust obligations. None of the former citizens of the Hawaiian kingdom held any cognizable interest in these lands" (3). To support this claim the Petitioner notes that only the Monarch enjoyed title to "Crown lands." When these lands were ceded by the Republic of Hawaii to the United States, the Resolution stipulated that these lands would "be used solely for the benefit of the inhabitants of the Hawaiian Islands for educational and other public purposes." (Emphasis added by Petitioner). The Petitioner would use population statistics up through the turn of the 20th century to show that the Kingdom of Hawaii had been "consciously multiracial," and thus the term "inhabitants" referred to numerous races, including Westerners. Furthermore, the date of 1778 had obviously been chosen for the eligibility requirements because "it marks the last days of what might be characterized as the era of relative 'racial purity' in the Hawaiian Islands." (25). Any claim of a connection between that date and sovereignty status for native Hawaiians is bogus, for the Kingdom of Hawaii did not exist until 1810. Also, during the era of the Hawaiian kingdom, many who would not qualify as Hawaiian under the OHA statute were, in fact, full citizens of the Kingdom. In particularly strong terms, the OHA is denounced for using a "blood quantum" to define eligibility status, a requirement that is "disturbingly reminiscent of the 'Blood Protection' and 'Citizenship' laws adopted as part of the infamous Nuremberg Laws".

The Petitioner also denies that Salyer, with its "special limited purpose" exception to the 14th Amendment's Equal Protection clause, is appropriate in this case. First, because Salyer dealt with land ownership, and not race, it does not apply to begin with. The 9th Circuit Court thus made a grievous error when it determined that this case was "'not the sort [of election] that has previously triggered Fifteenth Amendment analysis'." (Pet. Br. 18). Such a determination would "create an infinitely elastic loophole" in which anyone could circumvent the 15th amendment by simply claiming that the purposes of any such election was "limited." The Petitioner quotes Terry v. Adams (1953), which held that the 15th Amendment's prohibition of race-based election laws "included any election in which public issues are decided or public officials selected." (19) Furthermore, Salyer is an inappropriate defense under the 15th Amendment because it was decided as an exception to the 14th Amendment, due to that amendment's "one man, one vote" rule. Thus, it cannot be applied to the 15th Amendment's explicit ban on race-based qualifications. The Petitioner quotes from Gomillion v. Lightfoot (1960) to illustrate that the 15th Amendment is absolute, no matter how carefully constructed the means to a racially discriminatory end. That case concerned a district in Alabama that had been drafted such that it excluded all potential non-white voters. Though race was mentioned nowhere in the statute, it had been struck down due to the clearly racially discriminatory result. Quoting Lane v. Wilson (1939) as well, the Petitioner notes that the 15th Amendment "'nullifies sophisticated as well as simple-minded modes of discrimination'" and goes on to say that "In contrast to the purportedly race-neutral grandfather clauses, white primaries, and gerrymanders invalidated in the foregoing cases, the OHA voting restriction is startlingly 'simple-minded'. Hawaii closes its election booth to anyone who fails its racial test" (16).

The OHA cannot be justified on the grounds that enfranchisement is limited to those who are the interested parties, for the same logic could have been applied to the Gomillion gerrymander case. "Both constitute attempts to achieve a 'racially pure' voting bloc justified on the ground that the right to vote has merely been limited to those 'primarily affected' by the decisions of the elected officials." Besides, the entire concept of an exception under Salyer is inapplicable in the first place, even if it did constitute an exception to the 15th as well as the 14th amendment. This is because the "'disproportionate effect' prong requires, at a minimum, that the costs of those activities be borne disproportionately by those granted the right to vote ... the Salyer exception, therefore, cannot be applied to the OHA, a state agency that expends substantial funds drawn from taxes paid by all citizens of Hawaii without regard to race" (20). Because those state officials chosen in OHA elections "manage and spend both legislative appropriations and public lands proceeds, it is axiomatic that all Hawaiian citizens ... have a legitimate interest in the proper management of those funds" (20-21). Furthermore, the comparative wealth of those funds and the "sweeping" authority with which the OHA manages them, along with the numerous and government-like programs that it administers, render the comparison between a small water storage district and the OHA untenable.

More controversially, the Petitioner discounts the idea that there is a "compelling state interest" in limiting the OHA elections based on the history the State's relationship with native Hawaiians (i.e., in order to protect against current discrimination or offset the effects of past discrimination). "Nothing in the record demonstrates ... the existence of any past or present discrimination against racial 'Hawaiians'." (31). The Petitioner sarcastically notes that "The Respondent now takes the position that the State of Hawaii has a compelling interest in engaging in blatant discrimination today – and indefinitely into the future – in order to make up for even-handed treatment of all Hawaiian citizens, regardless of race, in the past" (32). Nor may a compelling interest be inferred from the necessity for the State to uphold its "trust" relationship with the natives, for the Supreme Court "has never held that a legislatively declared 'trust' relationship suffices to justify racial discrimination in voting" (31). Furthermore, the use of Morton v. Mancari to illustrate the nature of that implied "special relationship" has no bearing on Hawaii. For one thing, in recognizing that the Constitution's Indian Commerce and Treaty Clauses denotes such a relationship for Indian Tribes, Morton v. Mancari's outcome "was expressly predicated on the fact that the challenged preference involved a tribal, rather than racial, classification" (39). More importantly, native Hawaiians do not constitute a federally recognized Indian Tribe. The Petitioner notes that the 1867 treaty which ceded Alaska included a clause by which all inhabitants would be given U.S. citizenship "with the exception of the uncivilized native tribes." By contrast, the Organic Act of 1900, which granted territorial status to Hawaii, provided citizenship to "all persons who were citizens of the Republic of Hawaii" in 1898. This, of course, included native Hawaiians; the Petitioner then points out that, in fact, these Native Hawaiians "were the dominant political group in Hawaii for several decades after annexation, and were well represented in all forms of public office" (43). Thus the "special relationship" or "trust" based on tribal sovereignty no bearing on the situation in Hawaii.

=== Respondent's argument ===
Naturally, the Respondent did not agree. After reiterating that the voting qualifications are political rather than racial, and that the elections qualify for "limited purpose" and "disproportionate effect" exceptions, the Respondent turns quickly to the heart of the matter: the "special relationship." Though native Hawaiians are not formally recognized as an Indian tribe, Congress and the Court have "recognized a special obligation to America's first inhabitants and their descendants ... and have recognized that Congress is empowered to honor that obligation as it sees fit" (Res. Br. 2). Because Congress has explicitly noted that such an obligation pertains to Alaskan Natives, despite their distinction from traditional Indian tribes of the lower 48 states, it naturally follows that this distinction extends to Hawaiian natives as well. For the Petitioner to rely on the literal wording of treaties signed at the turn of the 20th century misses the point entirely. Indeed, by 1898, "the era of treaty-making with the indigenous people of the American continent had come to an end," and this is why there is no mention of such a distinction in the Annexation Act (6). Yet, with the creation of the HHCA in 1921, "Congress has recognized that it has a special relationship with indigenous Hawaiians, and has sought to enable them to benefit in some measure from their homelands" (6). The Respondent goes on to quote Congress' contemporary assertion that the HHCA "affirm[ed] the trust relationship between the United States and the Native Hawaiians" (42 U.S.C. § 11701 (13)) as well as the statement that "In recognition of the special relationship which exists between the United States and the Native Hawaiian people, [it] has extended to Native Hawaiians the same rights and privileges accorded to American Indian, Alaska Native, Eskimo, and Aleut communities" (20 U.S.C. § 7902(13)) (both as quoted in Respondent's Brief, 8–9).

Special attention is given to the 1993 Joint Resolution of Congress known as the "Apology Resolution," which expressed regret for the role of the United States in the 1893 coup and "the deprivation of the rights of Native Hawaiians to self-determination." The Respondent further notes that "The [apology resolution] specifically acknowledged that 'the health and well-being of the Native Hawaiian people is intrinsically tied to ... the land', that land was taken from Hawaiians without their consent or compensation, and that indigenous Hawaiians have 'never directly relinquished their claims ... over their national lands'." (8). The Respondent cites numerous other Congressional utterances that refer to "special" or "trust" relationships, or which refer to Native Hawaiians as "distinct" or "unique" indigenous peoples. In creating the OHA and the voting requirements thereof, Hawaii was simply "reaffirming the 'solemn trust obligation and responsibility to native Hawaiians'." (Res. Br. 9). The fact that Congress has consistently recognized and appropriated funds to the OHA implicitly affirms its legitimacy. So does the recognition that the "constitution and statutes of the State of Hawaii ... acknowledge the distinct land rights of the Native Hawaiian people as beneficiaries of the public lands trust ... [and] reaffirm and protect the unique right of the Native Hawaiian people to practice and perpetuate their cultural and religious customs, beliefs, practices, and language" (42 U.S.C. § 11701 (3) as quoted in Res. Br. 11). In addition, the Hawaiian Constitution was amended in 1978 to include the OHA after an affirmative vote open to all citizens of the State.

Finally, given the active role that the U.S. Legislature has taken in affirming the "special relationship," and the plenary power given to Congress in acknowledging tribal status (explicitly delegated, in this instance, to the State of Hawaii), it is not appropriate for the Court to deny its existence of that status, or to determine its terms. "Classifications based on Congress' decision to assume a special trust relationship with an indigenous people are not based on race, but rather the unique legal and political status that such a relationship entails," and, furthermore, "the Framers of the Constitution drew no distinctions among different groups of indigenous people in conferring [such] power ... on Congress, and the Framers of the Civil War Amendments never envisioned that those amendments would restrict the ability of Congress to exercise that power" (Res. Br. 14). In other words, by relying on a literal interpretation of said amendments or tribal classifications, the Petitioner was, again, missing the point.

== Opinion of the Court ==
The Supreme Court sided with the Petitioner. In a 7–2 decision based entirely on the 15th Amendment, they reversed the judgment of the Court of Appeals for the 9th Circuit, with Justices Stevens and Ginsburg dissenting. Justice Kennedy wrote the opinion for the Court, which was joined by Chief Justice Rehnquist, and Justices O'Connor, Scalia and Thomas. They note that the 15th Amendment is certainly not bound by the language or circumstances surrounding its enactment, and that it is "quite sufficient to invalidate a scheme which did not mention race but instead used ancestry in an attempt to confine and restrict the voting franchise" (16). After all, "ancestry can be a proxy for race. It is that proxy here" (18). The structure of the OHA elections is "neither subtle nor indirect. It is specific in granting the vote to persons of defined ancestry and to no others" (17). The Respondent's argument that "descendants ... of [the] aboriginal peoples" does not mean the same thing as "descendants ... of the races" is "undermined by its express racial purpose and by its actual effects" (20). As for Morton v. Mancari, were Hawaii's voting restrictions to be sustained under that authority, "we would be required to accept some beginning premises not yet established in our case law" (22). Regardless: "Even were we to take the substantial step of finding authority in Congress, delegated to the State, to treat Hawaiians or native Hawaiians as tribes, Congress may not authorize a State to create a voting scheme of this sort" — that is, one that uses race as an eligibility requirement (22). The 15th Amendment is absolute even under such conditions, for the election of OHA trustees is still a State election, to which the Amendment clearly applies. Nor is the restriction based on beneficiary status rather than race, for "although the bulk of the funds for which OHA is responsible appears to be earmarked for the benefit of 'native Hawaiians', the State permits both 'native Hawaiians' and 'Hawaiians' to vote" — that is, both those who qualify with a 50% blood quantum and those who qualify as descendants of residents in 1778 — and "[this] classification thus appears to create, not eliminate, a differential alignment between the identity of OHA trustees and what the State calls beneficiaries" (27). Yet, again, such details are irrelevant to the Court, for "Hawaii's argument fails on more essential grounds ... [i.e.] the demeaning premise that citizens of a particular race are somehow more qualified than others to vote on certain matters. That reasoning attacks the central meaning of the Fifteenth Amendment" (27). The Court's opinion ends with a brief lecture to the State of Hawaii, concluding with the observation that Hawaii must "seek the political consensus that begins with a sense of shared purpose. One of the necessary beginning points is this principle: The Constitution of the United States, too, has become the heritage of all the citizens of Hawaii" (28).

=== Breyer's concurrence ===
Justice Breyer, in a concurring opinion joined by Justice Souter, elaborates on the problematic analogy between the OHA and a trust for the benefit of an Indian tribe. For Breyer, such a trust does not exist for native Hawaiians under the circumstances, mainly because the OHA electorate "does not sufficiently resemble an Indian tribe" (2). The OHA's hereditary requirement of an ancestor living in Hawaii in 1778 might include persons with "1 possible ancestor out of 500, thereby creating a vast and unknowable body of potential members" (4). This, Breyer believes, goes well beyond any "reasonable" definition of tribal status.

=== Dissents ===
Justice Stevens' dissent, joined in part by Justice Ginsburg, takes a much more charitable view of the "special relationship" between Hawaii and the United States, believing that "two centuries of Indian law precedent" alone justifies the OHA's voting laws under the Constitution, for "there is simply no invidious discrimination present in this effort to see that indigenous peoples are compensated for past wrongs" (3). He agrees with the Respondent that under Morton v. Mancari preferential treatment is justified if such treatment "can be tied rationally to the fulfillment of Congress' unique obligation towards the Indians" (5). Such obligations, Stevens believes, are implicit in the Apology Resolution of 1993, in addition to the more than 150 "varied laws passed by Congress ... [which] expressly include native Hawaiians as part of the class of Native Americans benefited" (7). Like the Respondent, Stevens believes that to reject the State's claims because native Hawaiians are not technically a "tribe" is to miss the point. There is a "compelling similarity, fully supported by our precedent, between the once subjugated, indigenous peoples of the continental United States and the peoples of the Hawaiian Islands" (8). In addition, Stevens points out that tribal membership alone was not the "decisive factor" when the Court upheld preferential treatment in Morton v. Mancari. In that case, the preference "not only extended to non-tribal member Indians, it also required for eligibility ... a certain quantum of Indian blood" (9). Thus, there is no tribal limitation concerning the Federal Government's authority over considerations for native peoples. "In light of this precedent,” Stevens continues, "it is a painful irony indeed to conclude that native Hawaiians are not entitled to special benefits designed to restore a measure of native self-governance because they currently lack any vestigial native government – a possibility of which history and the actions of this Nation have deprived them." As for Breyer's concurring opinion, Stevens succinctly dismisses the objection that the OHA's definition of native is not "reasonable" by noting simply that "this suggestion does not identify a constitutional defect" (9).
