= Bill Burgess (rugby league, born 1897) =

GB & England international rugby league footballer

Personal information
- Full name: William Burgess
- Born: 8 May 1897 Barrow-in-Furness district, England
- Died: November 1968 (aged 71)

Playing information
- Position: Prop
Club
Years	Team	Pld	T	G	FG	P
1919–33	Barrow	464	55	537		1239
Representative
Years	Team	Pld	T	G	FG	P
≥1919–≤33	Lancashire	17
1923–30	England	8	4	11	0	34
1924–30	Great Britain	16	0	0	0	0
- Relatives: Bill Burgess Jr (son)

William Burgess (8 May 1897 – November 1968) was an English professional rugby league footballer who played in the 1910s, 1920s and 1930s. He played at representative level for Great Britain, England and Lancashire, and at club level for Barrow, as a prop.

== Background ==
Burgess' birth was registered in Barrow-in-Furness district, Lancashire, England.

== International honours ==
Burgess won caps for England while at Barrow in 1923 against Wales, in 1924 against Other Nationalities, in 1925 against Wales (2 matches), in 1926 against Wales, and Other Nationalities, in 1928 against Wales, and in 1930 against Other Nationalities, and won caps for Great Britain while at Barrow in 1924 against Australia (3 matches), and New Zealand (3 matches), in 1926–27 against New Zealand (3 matches), in 1928 against Australia (3 matches), and New Zealand (2 matches), and in 1929–30 against Australia (2 matches).

== Honoured at Barrow Raiders ==
Burgess is a Barrow Raiders Hall of Fame inductee.

== Personal life ==
Burgess was the father of the rugby league footballer; Bill Burgess.

== Outside of rugby league ==
Following his retirement from playing rugby league, Bill Burgess was the Landlord of the Washington Hotel, Roose Road, Barrow-in-Furness
