= Grassroot Institute of Hawaii =

Public policy think tank

Grassroot Institute
- Established: February 12, 2001
- Founder: Richard Rowland
- Tax ID no.: 99-0354937
- Legal status: 501(c)(3) nonprofit organization
- Services: Multifaceted efforts to shed light on government operations and spending; public education regarding the movement to create a sovereign Hawaiian nation and/or other governmental entity; research into the effect of the 1920 Jones Act on the state of Hawaii.
- President and chief executive officer: W. Keli'i Akina
- Chairman: Robin Stueber
- Budget: Revenue: $1.65 million Expenses: $1.72 million (FYE December 2023)
- Website: www.grassrootinstitute.org

The Grassroot Institute of Hawaii is a 501(c)(3) nonprofit public policy think tank based in Honolulu, Hawaii. The organization's stated mission is to "educate people about the values of individual liberty, economic freedom, and accountable government." It promotes free market values and produces research on subjects like the Jones Act and pension issues. The current Chief Executive Officer is Dr. Keli'i Akina. The Institute was formed on February 12, 2001 by Richard Rowland. The organization is a member of the State Policy Network, a conservative and libertarian network of state-based think tanks.

== Issues ==
The Grassroot Institute has published commentary on a variety of political issues, from a legal minimum wage to Hawaiian sovereignty. The Grassroot Institute conducts research and analysis of various issues from a free market perspective. Academic works are inspired by the writings of scholars such as Frederic Bastiat, Murray Rothbard, Milton Friedman, F.A. Hayek, and Adam Smith. Generally, the institute opposes tax increases, such as Hawaii's General Excise Tax.

=== The Jones Act ===
The Grassroot Institute of Hawaii supports reform of the Jones Act that would address its disproportionate shipbuilding and cargo shipping restrictions effect on Hawaii.

=== Honolulu rail project ===
The Grassroot Institute of Hawaii has been a vocal critic of the Honolulu Authority for Rapid Transportation's rail project in Honolulu. The Institute hasn't made any public comments on whether the rail should stop at Middle Street, which is a popular belief among opponents. The only official position of the Institute is that HART be subject to an independent audit for fraud, waste and abuse.

In 2017, the Institute launched the campaign to audit the rail, which eventually gained momentum and resulted in a financial and management audit by Hawaii state auditor Les Kondo in 2018.

=== Hawaiian sovereignty ===
The Grassroot Institute joined with other groups to file suit against the State of Hawaii's efforts to form and gain federal recognition of a race-based, sovereign nation. The lawsuit, filed in 2015, seeks to block state-funded race-based elections in Hawaii.
