= Office of Hawaiian Affairs =

Government body in the State of Hawaii, US

- Keʻena Kuleana Hawaiʻi (Hawaiian)
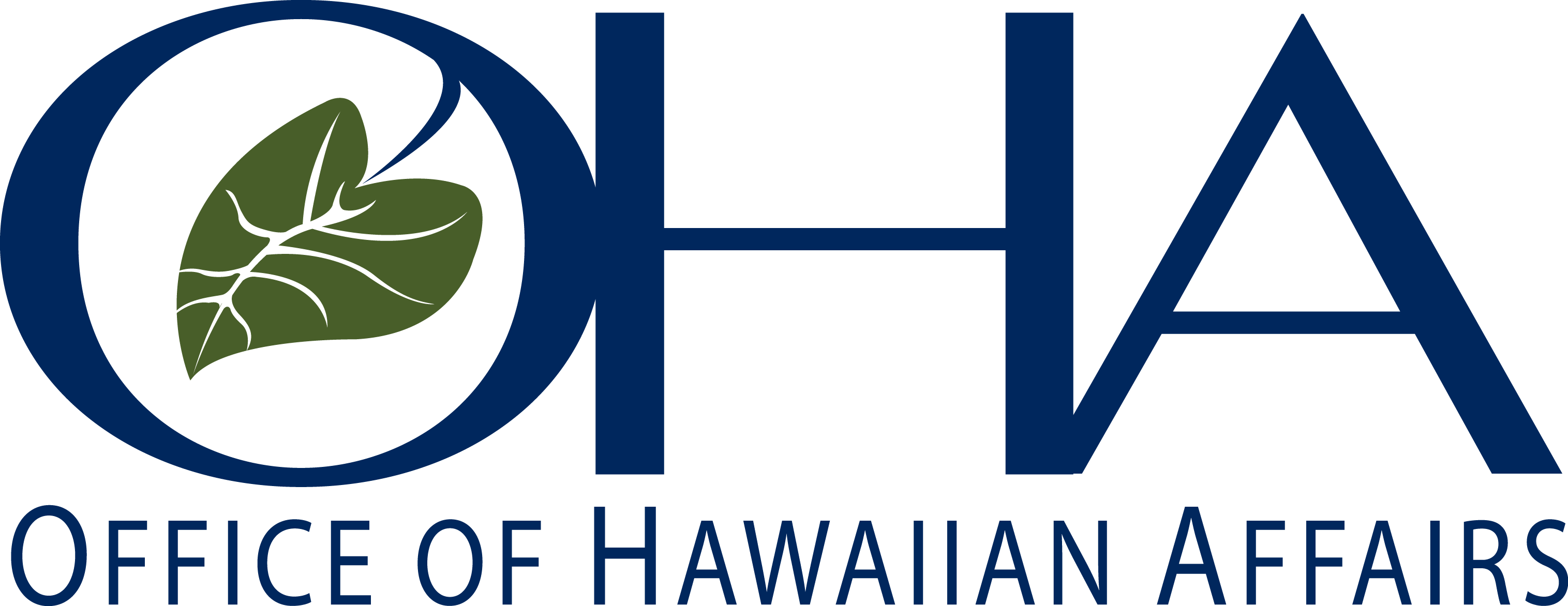

Agency overview
- Formed: 1978
- Headquarters: Nā Lama Kukui 560 N Nimitz Hwy #200 Honolulu, HI 96817
- Agency executives: Summer Sylva, Ka Pouhana Kūikawā (Interim Chief Executive Officer); K. Sean Kekina, Ka Pou Nui (Chief Operating Officer)
- Website: Official website

The Office of Hawaiian Affairs (OHA) (Hawaiian: Keʻena Kuleana Hawaiʻi) is a self-governing corporate body of the State of Hawaii created by the 1978 Hawaii State Constitutional Convention. It is often described as the fourth branch of government in Hawaiʻi.

OHA's mandate is to advance the education, health, housing and economics of (Kānaka Maoli) Native Hawaiians. OHA conducts research and advocacy to shape public policies. OHA works with communities to share information and build public support for Hawaiian issues.

OHA was given control over certain public lands, and acquired other land-holdings for the provision of housing, supporting agriculture, and supporting cultural institutions. The lands initially given to OHA were originally crown lands of the Kingdom of Hawaiʻi, which had gone through various forms of public ownership since the overthrow of the Hawaiian Kingdom.

OHA is a semi-autonomous government body administered by a nine-member board of trustees, elected by the people of the State of Hawaiʻi through popular suffrage. OHA manages more than $600 million worth of assets on behalf of Native Hawaiians. Although OHA is independent from the governor's office and other state departments, the state has significant control over the organization's general funding from public land trust revenues.

== Background ==
In 1893, pro-American elements in Hawaii overthrew the monarchy and formed the Republic of Hawaii, which the U.S. annexed in 1898. In 1921, in order to make amends for injustices associated with the overthrow and annexation, the US created the Hawaiian Homes Commissions Act which set aside 200,000 acres of land for the use of homelands for Native Hawaiians of 50% blood quantum or more. It was meant to create some compensation for forced colonization of the indigenous peoples, but in 1959 Hawaii was officially adopted as the fiftieth state of the US, with the Statehood Admissions Act defining "Native Hawaiian" as any person descended from the aboriginal people of Hawaii, living there prior to 1778. The Ceded lands (lands once owned by the Hawaiian kingdom monarchy) were transferred from the federal government to the State of Hawaii for the "betterment of the conditions of the native Hawaiians".

In 1978 the Office of Hawaiian Affairs (OHA) was created in response to the growing Hawaiian sovereignty movement of the 1970s to manage that portion of the ceded lands allotted to Hawaiian Homelands, advance the lifestyle of Native Hawaiians, preserve Hawaiian culture and protect Native Hawaiian rights. It was established during the 1978 state constitutional convention. Government funding has created programs, schools, scholarships and teaching curriculums through OHA. Many of these organizations, agencies and trusts like OHA, have had a good deal of legal issues over the years. OHA has also been questioned for programs and services to Hawaiians of less than the fifty percent required blood quantum (the minimum requirement to qualify for Hawaiian Homelands).

In 1980, OHA launched their publication, Ka Wai Ola. The digital version was launched in 2020.

In June 2026, OHA announced its intent to explore the purchase of Honolulu ABC affiliate KITV and its sister station KIKU from Allen Media Group. OHA said in a statement that ownership of a major television station would allow for the amplification of Native Hawaiian culture. A review is expected to take about 90 days. OHA previously explored purchasing KGMB in 2006.

== Board of trustees ==
OHA Board of Trustees
- Office of Hawaiian Affairs Board of Trustees
- Papa Kahu Waiwai (Hawaiian)
- Established: 1978 Hawaii State Constitutional Convention
- Type: Governmental
- Headquarters: Nā Lama Kukui
- Location: Honolulu, Hawaii
- Members: 9
- Official language: English, Hawaiian
- Chair: Kai Kahele
- Main organ: Elected board
- Publication: Ka Wai Ola

The Office of Hawaiian Affairs is governed by an elected board of nine trustees. The constitution provides an outline of that board, "There shall be a board of trustees for the Office of Hawaiian Affairs elected by qualified voters who are Hawaiians, as provided by law. The board members shall be Hawaiians. There shall be not less than nine members of the board of trustees; provided that each of the following Islands have one representative: Oahu, Kauai, Maui, Molokai and Hawaii. The board shall select a chairperson from its members. The board of trustees provision was amended upon a United States Supreme Court ruling in the case of Rice v. Cayetano that non-Hawaiians could not be excluded from the election process, including the right of non-Hawaiians to run for such an office. The board of trustees generally meets twice a month.

The constitution adds, "The board of trustees of the Office of Hawaiian Affairs shall exercise power as provided by law: to manage and administer the proceeds from the sale or other disposition of the lands, natural resources, minerals and income derived from whatever sources for native Hawaiians and Hawaiians, including all income and proceeds from that pro rata portion of the trust referred to in section 4 of this article for native Hawaiians; to formulate policy relating to affairs of native Hawaiians and Hawaiians; and to exercise control over real and personal property set aside by state, federal or private sources and transferred to the board for native Hawaiians and Hawaiians. The board shall have the power to exercise control over the Office of Hawaiian Affairs through its executive officer, the administrator of the Office of Hawaiian Affairs, who shall be appointed by the board." On January 30, 1989 the board of trustees agreed that salaries should be consistent with other departments of the State of Hawaii.

=== Elections ===
The first OHA trustee elections were held in November 1980. Approximately 54,000 eligible citizens with Hawaiian blood registered to vote, and almost 43,000 cast ballots for 136 candidates. However, in the U.S. Supreme Court case Rice v. Cayetano (2000), the court accused OHA of violating the fourteenth and fifteenth amendments to the United States constitution with voting provisions that were race-based, ruling that restricting voting to Native Hawaiians was unconstitutional. Although this ruling allowed all registered voters regardless of ancestry to cast votes for OHA, many voters customarily opt out, as in the 2022 elections, when 41.5% of ballots cast for the O'ahu resident trustee race were left blank.

Trustees are elected to a four-year term by general election of Hawaii registered voters. Four-year terms are staggered and begin and end on the date of the general election.

OHA trustee elections are nonpartisan. Although five of the nine seats on the Board of Trustees require candidates to reside on a designated island or island group, all OHA trustee contests are elected statewide by all registered voters in Hawaiʻi rather than solely by voters residing on the trustee's respective island.

==== List of elections ====
- 2026 Office of Hawaiian Affairs election

=== Current board of trustees ===
OHA Board of Trustees
District	Name	Start	Party	Next Election
At-Large	Keli‘i Akina	November 8, 2016	Republican	2028
At-Large	Brickwood Galuteria	November 8, 2022	Democratic	2030
At-Large	Keoni Souza, Vice Chair	November 8, 2022	Republican	2030
At-Large	Ikaika Anderson	November 3, 2026	Democratic	2030
Hawaii Island	Kai Kahele, Chair	November 5, 2024	Democratic	2028
Kauai and Niihau	Dan Ahuna	November 6, 2012	Independent	2028
Maui	Carmen Hulu Lindsey	January 17, 2012 (appointed)	Independent	2030
Molokai and Lanai	Luana Alapa	November 3, 2020	Independent	2028
Oahu	Kalei Akaka	November 6, 2018	Democratic	2030

Although the elections are nonpartisan, the party affiliations above reflect known political history, candidate self-declaration, or state party support.

==== Past chairs of the OHA board of trustees ====
- Frenchy DeSoto (1981–1982)
- Moses K. Keale Sr. (1982)
- Joseph G. Kealoha Jr. (1982–Feb. 1986)
- Rockne Freitas (Feb. 1986–Dec. 1986)
- Moses K. Keale Sr. (Jan. 1987–Aug. 1988)
- Louis "Lui" Ha'o (Aug. 1988–Nov. 1988)
- Thomas Kaʻulukukui Sr. (Nov. 1988–Dec. 1990)
- Moses K. Keale Sr. (Dec. 1990–May 1991)
- Clayton Hee (May 1991–Oct. 1997)
- Frenchy DeSoto (Nov. 1997–Dec. 1998)
- Rowena Akana (Dec. 1998–Jan. 2000)
- Clayton Hee (Jan. 2000–Dec. 2000)
- Haunani Apoliona (Dec. 2000–Sep. 2001)
- Clayton Hee (Sep. 2001–Feb. 2002)
- Haunani Apoliona (Feb. 2002–2010)
- Colette Machado (2010–2014)
- Robert Kamaile "Bob" Lindsey Jr. (2014–2016)
- Rowena Akana (Dec. 2016–Feb. 2017)
- Colette Machado (2017–2020)
- Carmen Hulu Lindsey (2020–2024)

==== Timeline ====
DeSoto
Keale
Kealoha
Freitas
Ha'o
Kaʻulukukui
Hee
Akana
Apoliona
Machado
R. Lindsey
C. Lindsey
Kahele
│
1981
│
1983
│
1985
│
1987
│
1989
│
1991
│
1993
│
1995
│
1997
│
1999
│
2001
│
2003
│
2005
│
2007
│
2009
│
2011
│
2013
│
2015
│
2017
│
2019
│
2021
│
2023
│
2025
│
2027
│
2029
OHA Chairs from 1981 to 2026

==== List of former OHA trustees ====
- Lei Ahu Isa
- Abraham Aiona
- Moanike'ala Akaka
- Rowena Akana
- Peter Apo
- S. Haunani Apoliona
- Billie Beamer
- Dante Carpenter
- Donald Cataluna
- Linda Dela Cruz
- Frenchy DeSoto
- Rocky Freitas
- Clayton Hee
- Walter Heen
- Kamaki Kanahele III
- Thomas Kaʻulukukui Sr.
- Moses Keale Sr.
- Samuel Kealoha
- Brendon Kalei'āina Lee
- Keola Lindsey
- Colette Machado
- Charles Ota
- Walter Ritte
- Oswald Stender
- Mililani Trask

== Administrator/Ka Pouhana ==
The OHA board appoints an executive officer who serves as the Administrator, or Ka Pouhana, of the Office of Hawaiian Affairs.

In September 2025, following the removal of former administrator Stacy Ferreira, the OHA board appointed Summer Sylva as interim administrator. Sylva served as chief of staff to the board of trustees and is a former executive director of the Native Hawaiian Legal Corporation.

=== Officers ===
Position	Name
Administrator & CEO/Ka Pouhana	Summer Sylva (interim)
COO/Ka Pou Nui	K. Sean Kekina

=== List of former OHA administrators ===
- Edwin Parker Lanikini Auld Jr. (Dec. 1980–1986)
- Thomas Awa "Kamaki" Kanahele III (1986–1989)
- Richard Kekumuikawaiokeola Paglinawan (1989–1993)
- Dante Keala Carpenter (1994–1995)
- Linda Colburn (1995–1997)
- Randall Ogata (1997–2001)
- Clyde Namuʻo (2001–2011)
- Dr. Kamanaʻopono Crabbe (2011–2019)
- Dr. Sylvia Hussey (2019–2023)
- Stacy Ann Kealohilani Ferreira (2023–2025)

== See also ==
- 1978 Hawaii State Constitutional Convention
- Hawaiian sovereignty movement
- Hawaiian Renaissance
- Kanaiolowalu
- Ceded lands (Hawaii)
- Hawaii v. Office of Hawaiian Affairs
