= Sam Kahaʻieuanalio Kaʻai =

Native Hawaiian master wood carver

Sam Kahaʻieuanalio Kaʻai (1938–present) is a Native Hawaiian master wood carver and is recognized as a Living Treasure of Hawaii by the Office of Hawaiian Affairs for his carving.

Born in 1938, Kaʻai was born in Hāna. He grew up in Wailuku and Waiehu. Kaʻai's middle name, Kahaʻieuanalio, means "the carrier of the world."

Kaʻai attended Central Intermediate School and McKinsley High School in Honolulu. He studied illustration under Joseph Feher at the Honolulu Academy of Arts. He also studied sculpture with Edward M. Brownlee. Kaʻai assisted South Kona carver Anton Akoni Grace with the Puʻuhonua o Hōnaunau National Historical Park restoration project in the 1960s and 1970s.

In 1976, Kaʻai carved two kiʻi (carved images of gods) for the sailing canoe Hōkūleʻa's first journey from Oʻahu to Tahiti. In October 1988, Kaʻai studied with the New Zealand Maori Arts South Pacific Council as a Fulbright Scholar.

In 2006, Kaʻai's work and life were showcased in an exhibit called "The Lifework and Collective Song of Sam Kaha'i Ka'ai, Naue Ka Honua (the earth shakes)—E ala mai ia Kihanuilulumoku (Kihanuilulumoku awakens)" at the Maui Arts & Cultural Center.

In 2017, Kaʻai was recognized as a Living Treasure of Hawaii by the Office of Hawaiian Affairs for his carving. In 2024, Kaʻai was awarded the Year of Community Spirit Award by the First Peoples Fund.

Kaʻai lost many of his wood carvings and cultural artifacts due to the 2023 Maui fires, including the two ki'i carved for the sailing canoe Hōkūleʻa.

== External Resources ==
- Oral history interview with Sam Kahaʻieuanlio Kaʻai, 2024 September 21 and 22 by Carolyn Melenani Kualiʻi for the Archives of American Art
