= List of Hawaiian royal residences =

This is a list of residences once occupied by Hawaiian royalty during the Kingdom of Hawaii. Few can be referred to as palaces; most were private residences used by the aliʻi nui.

== Royal residences ==
Residence	Location	Occupant	Current Status	Ref
ʻĀinahau	Honolulu	Kaʻiulani	Estate willed to the City of Honolulu for a park; the house burned down in early 1900s; the Sheraton Princess Kaiulani Hotel was built on the ground	
Brick Palace	Lāhainā	Meant for Kaʻahumanu, but she had a grass hut built next to it and Kamehameha I lived in it for about a year.	Built by Mr. Mela [Miller] and Mr. Keka ‘ele’ele for Kaahumanu. Used by Kamehameha when he moved his court to this location. Converted into storage shed and later torn down; only the foundation and a memorial plaque remain	
Haimoeipo	Honolulu	Queen Kalama, Victoria Kamāmalu, Lunalilo	now site of the Hawaii State Capitol	
Haleʻākala (ʻAikupika)	Honolulu	Bernice Pauahi Bishop & Liliʻuokalani	converted to the Arlington Hotel which was later torn down in October 1908	
Haleʻākala (Royal Bungalow)	Honolulu	Kalākaua, Queen Kapiʻolani	Bungalow build on the ground of ʻIolani Palace, also called King's House, Queen's House or Healani (same as the Boathouse)	
Halekamani	Lāhainā	Nāhiʻenaʻena	sold to Gorham D. Gilman; ?	
Hale Kauila (Halekauwila)	Honolulu	Nāhiʻenaʻena, Kamehameha IV, Queen Kalama	Built by Kīnaʻu for Nāhiʻenaʻena during his fatal pregnancy; used as a residence and meeting place for Kamehameha III prior to 1845	
Hale Piula (or Halehuki)	Lāhainā	Kamehameha III	converted into courthouse after capital transferred to Honolulu, stones reused to construct new courthouse in 1858; part of Moku'ula site	
Hāliʻimaile	Honolulu, corner of King and Richards streets	Boki and Kuini Liliha, later Victoria Kamāmalu and Lot Kapuāiwa	?	
Hānaiakamalama (Queen Emma Summer Palace)	Nuʻuanu (2913 Pali Highway)	Queen Emma	converted into museum by the Daughters of Hawaii	
Healani (Kalākaua's Boathouse)	Honolulu Harbor	Kalākaua	?	
Helumoa (Royal Groves)	Waikīkī	Kamehameha V	part of Bishop Estates; the royal cottage no longer exist; the Royal Hawaiian Center is on the spot but the royal coconut groves still remain	
Hoʻihoʻikea	Honolulu	Kamehameha III, Kamehameha IV, Kamehameha V	Smaller royal residence flanking the west side of ʻIolani Palace on the west side. Named Hoʻihoʻikea (Restoration) in honor of Kamehameha III's restoration after the Paulet Affair of 1843.	
Honokaʻupu	Honolulu	Kekāuluohi, Charles Kanaʻina	Two-story coral house built for Kekāuluohi and her husband Charles Kanaʻina	
Honuakaha	Honolulu	Kalākaua, Kapiʻolani	private residence of King Kalākaua, Queen Kapiʻolani near the corner of Queen and Punchbowl streets; inherited from Kalākaua's hānai parents Haʻaheo Kaniu and Keaweamahi Kinimaka, once described as one of the residence of Kamehameha III ?	
Huliheʻe Palace	Kailua-Kona	Keʻelikōlani	converted into museum by the Daughters of Hawaii in 1927	
Ihikapukalani and Kauluhinano	Honolulu	Kamehameha IV, Queen Emma, Albert Kamehameha	Smaller royal residence flanking the east side of ʻIolani Palace; the makai side was known as Kauluhinano, and the mauka side was known as Ihikapukalani; site of the Hawaii State Archive building	
ʻIolani Palace	Honolulu	Kamehameha III, Kamehameha IV, Kamehameha V, Lunalilo, Kalākaua, Liliʻuokalani	original palace torn down to make way for 2nd palace due to termite damage; after the overthrow the 2nd palace became the executive building of the Provisionial Government, the Republic, and the Territory of Hawaii; later converted and remodeled into a museum	
Kamakahonu	Kailua-Kona	Kamehameha I	now part of the King Kamehameha's Kona Beach Hotel with the ʻAhuʻena Heiau restored	
Kaniakapupu	Honolulu	Kamehameha III	Summer home in Nu`uanu at Luakaha Falls, adjacent to Kaniakapupu heiau of Lono. In ruins.	
Keʻalohilani	Hamohamo, Waikīkī	Liliʻuokalani	Inherited from Liliʻuokalani's grandfather ʻAikanaka along with Paoakalani, reserved for her retainers	
Keōua Hale	Honolulu (1302 Queen Emma Street)	Keʻelikōlani	originally called Kaʻakopua before it burned down in 1873, the 1883 building was converted into a grammar school; razed in 1926 due to termite damage; open as the Central Middle School in 1928	
Kīnaʻu Hale	Honolulu	Keoni Ana, later Kalama, Albert Kūnuiākea	converted into the chamberlain quarters in later years; used for the inauguration ceremony of King Kalākaua in 1874	
Marine Residence	Waikīkī	Lunalilo, later Queen Emma	part of Queen Emma's trust; now site of the International Market Place	
Marine Residence	Kailua-Kona	Kamehameha IV	he declared his neutrality during the American Civil War from here; ?	
Mokuʻula	Lāhainā	Kamehameha III	abandoned in the mid-1800s; converted into a baseball field; now an archaeological site managed by the Friends of Mokuʻula; plans to restore the island and lake of Mokuhinia	
Muʻolaulani	Kapālama	Liliʻuokalani	now the site of the Liliuokalani Children's Center	
Paoakalani	Hamohamo, Waikīkī	Liliʻuokalani	Inherited from Liliʻuokalani's grandfather ʻAikanaka along with Kealohilani	
Papakanene and Mokuaikaua	Honolulu	Victoria Kamāmalu, Kekūanaōʻa	originally the residence of Kalanimoku, on the south side of the Honolulu Fort	
Pualeilani	Waikīkī	Kalākaua, Queen Kapiʻolani, Jonah Kūhiō Kalanianaʻole	willed to the City of Honolulu by Prince Kūhiō; became the Kuhio Beach	
Rooke House	Honolulu	Queen Emma	during the 1900s it was a kindergarten named Queen Emma Hall in honor of the last owner of the house. Later the site of Rooke House was occupied by the Liberty Theater (which closed in 1980) and is now a parking lot.	
Ululani or Kēhaulani	Honolulu	Victoria Kinoiki Kekaulike	willed to be site of maternity home; now site of Kapiolani Medical Center for Women and Children	
Waipiʻo Palace	Waipiʻo Valley	ancient Kings of Hawaii Island	destroyed by the King Kahekili II of Maui in the 1700s	
Wānanakoa	Nuʻuanu	Bernice Pauahi Bishop	now the site of the Royal Mausoleum	
Washington Place	Honolulu	Liliʻuokalani	used as the Governor's mansion; now a museum	

== Gallery ==
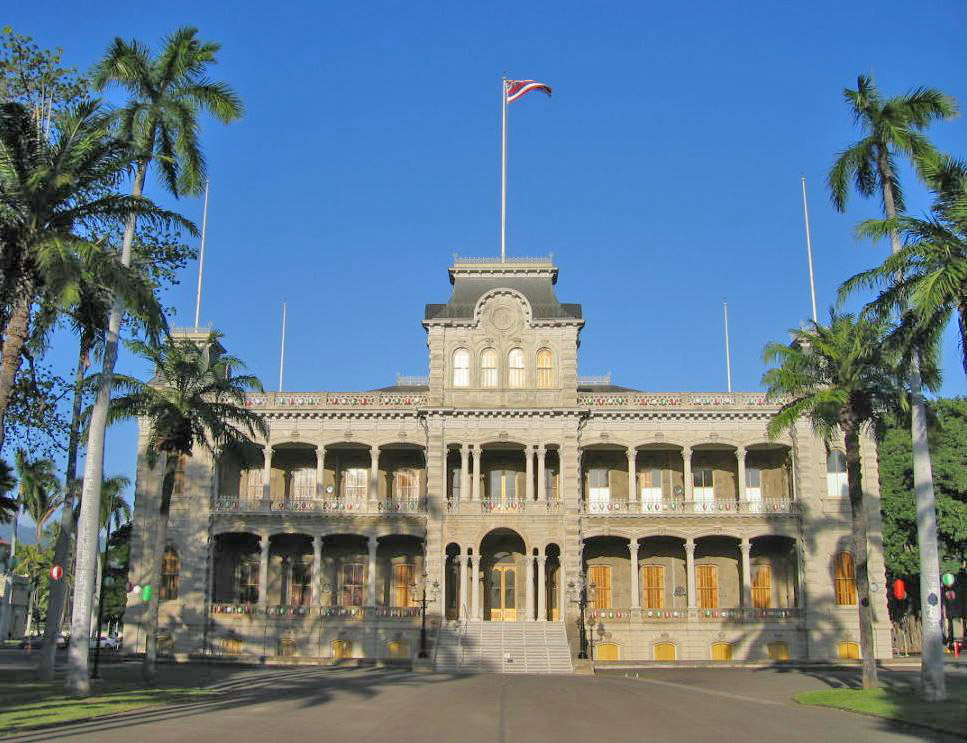
ʻIolani Palace

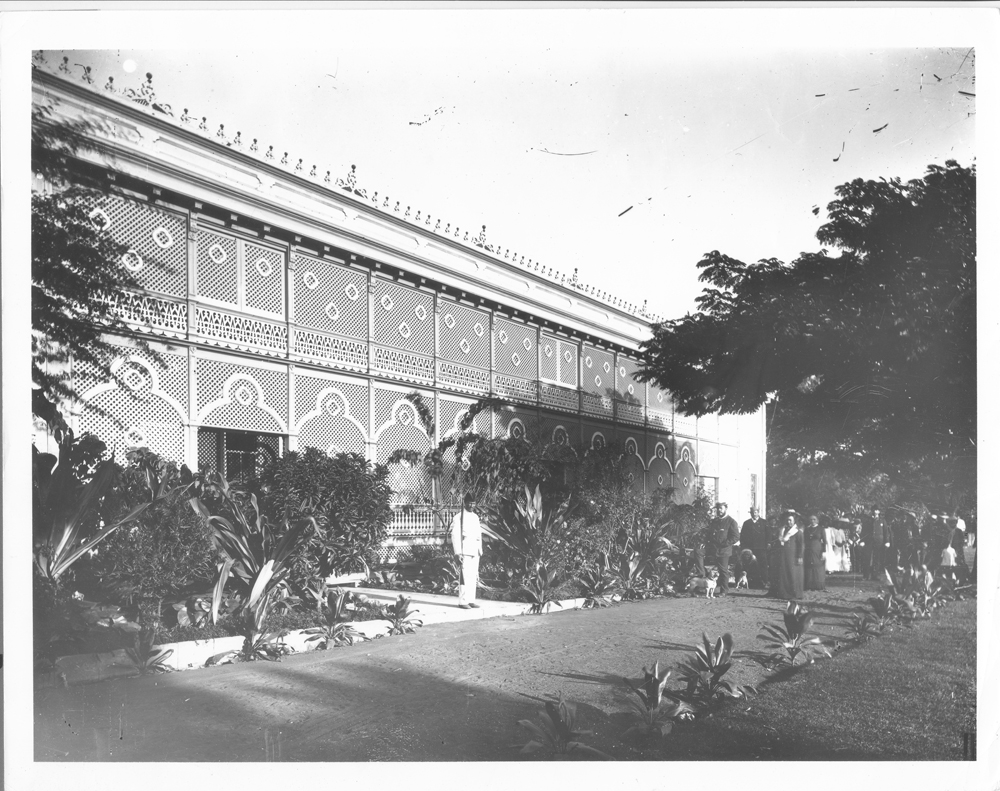
King Kalākaua's residence outside Iolani Palace before 1882

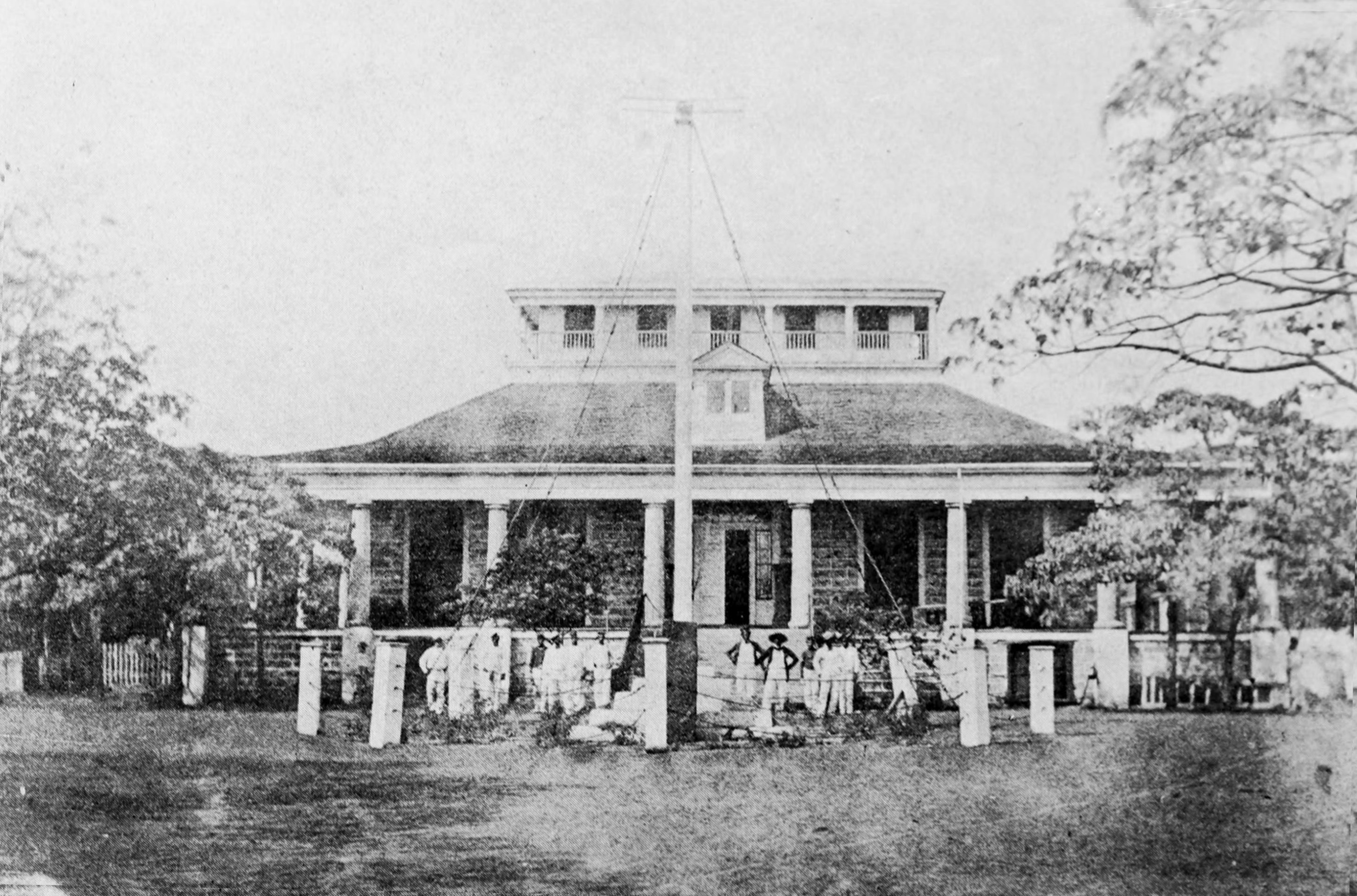
Hale Aliʻi, the first royal palace on the spot of the current ʻIolani Palace, in 1857.

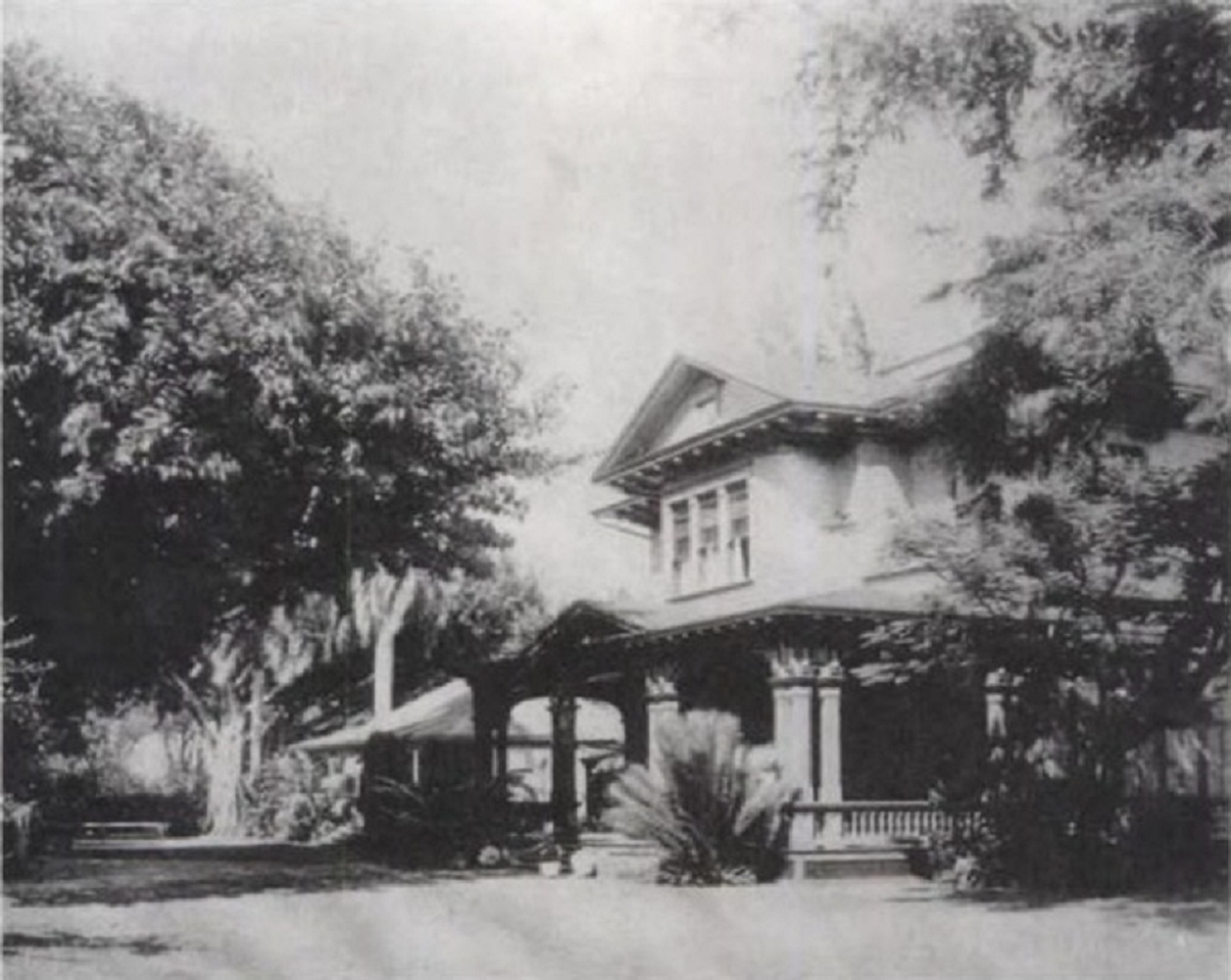
ʻĀinahau, home of Kaʻiulani, in the 1890s, showing the newly built Western house

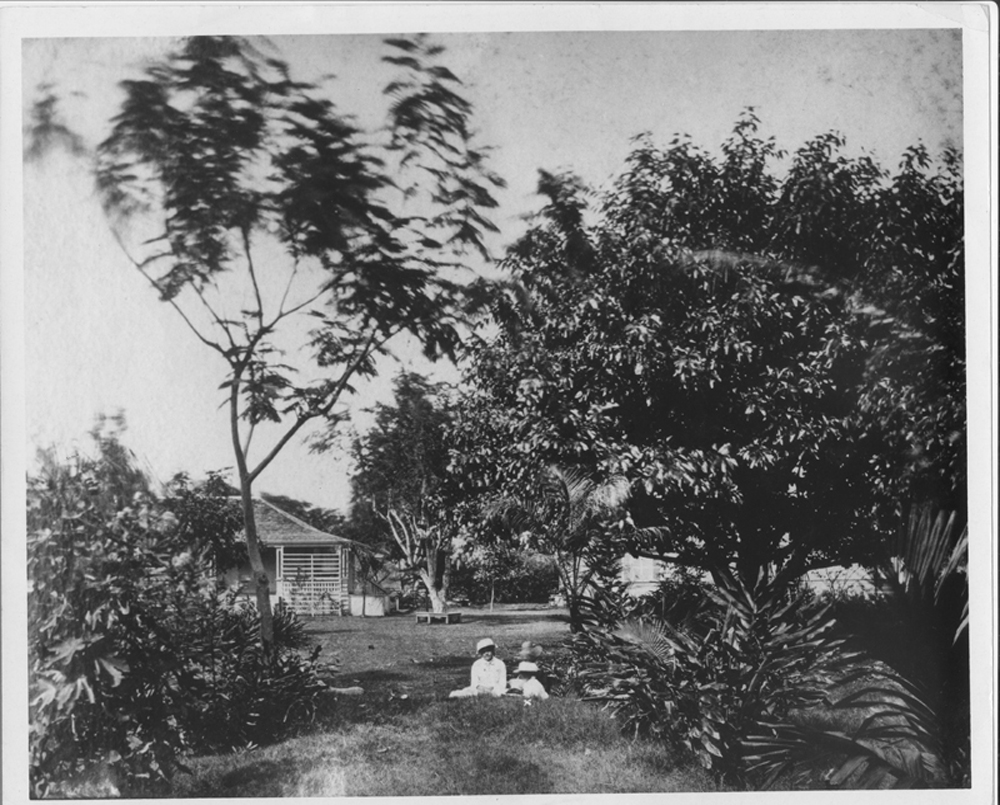
ʻĀinahau, home of Kaiʻulani, in the 1870s, showing the original family bungalow

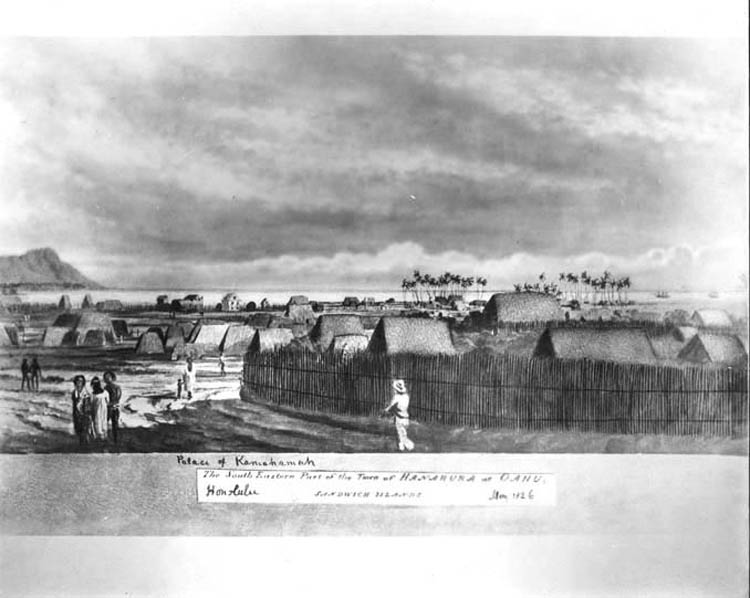
Grasshut palace of King Kamehameha III in Honolulu, 1826

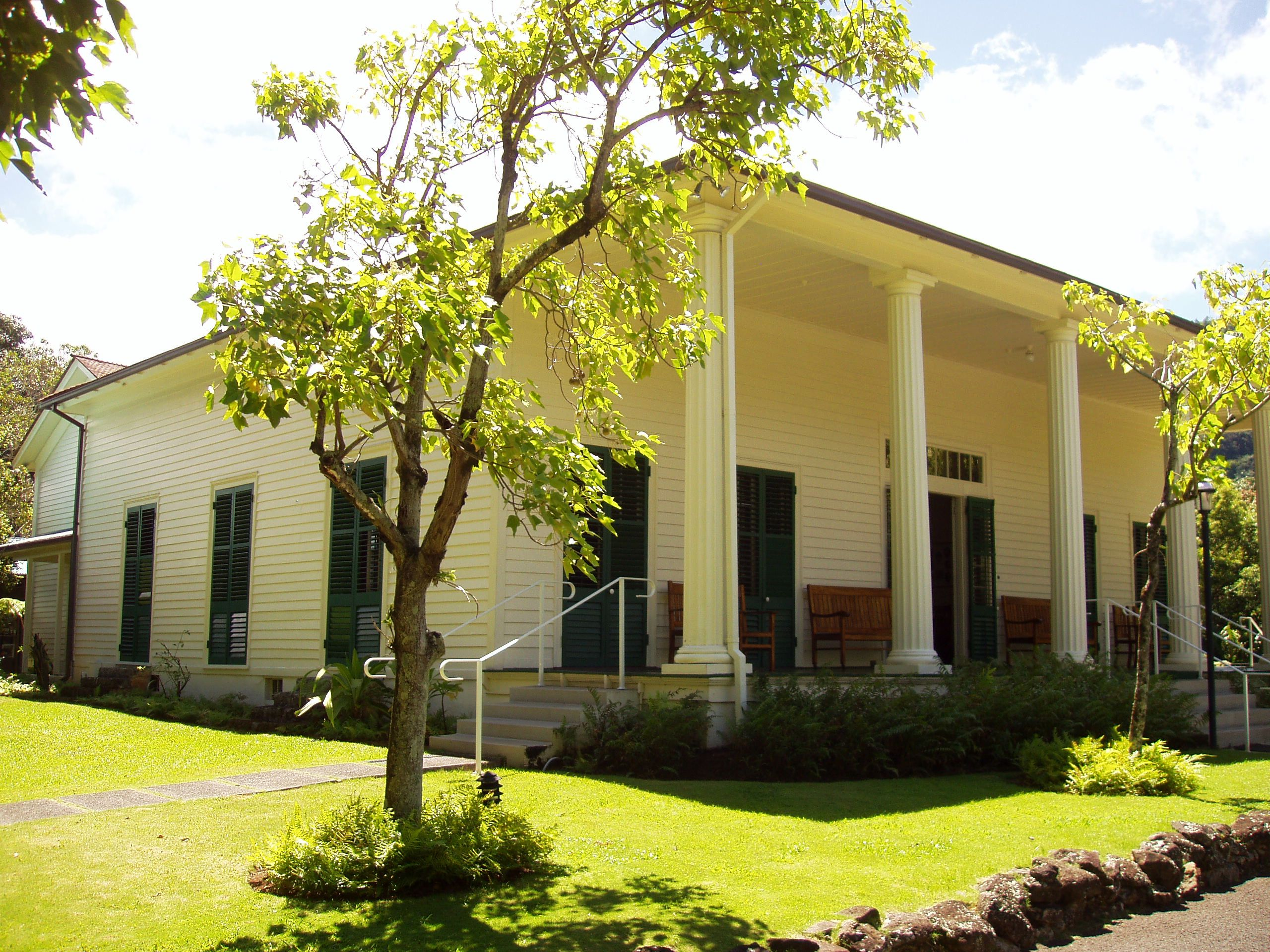
Hānaiakamālama, Queen Emma's Summer Palace in the Nuanuʻu Valley

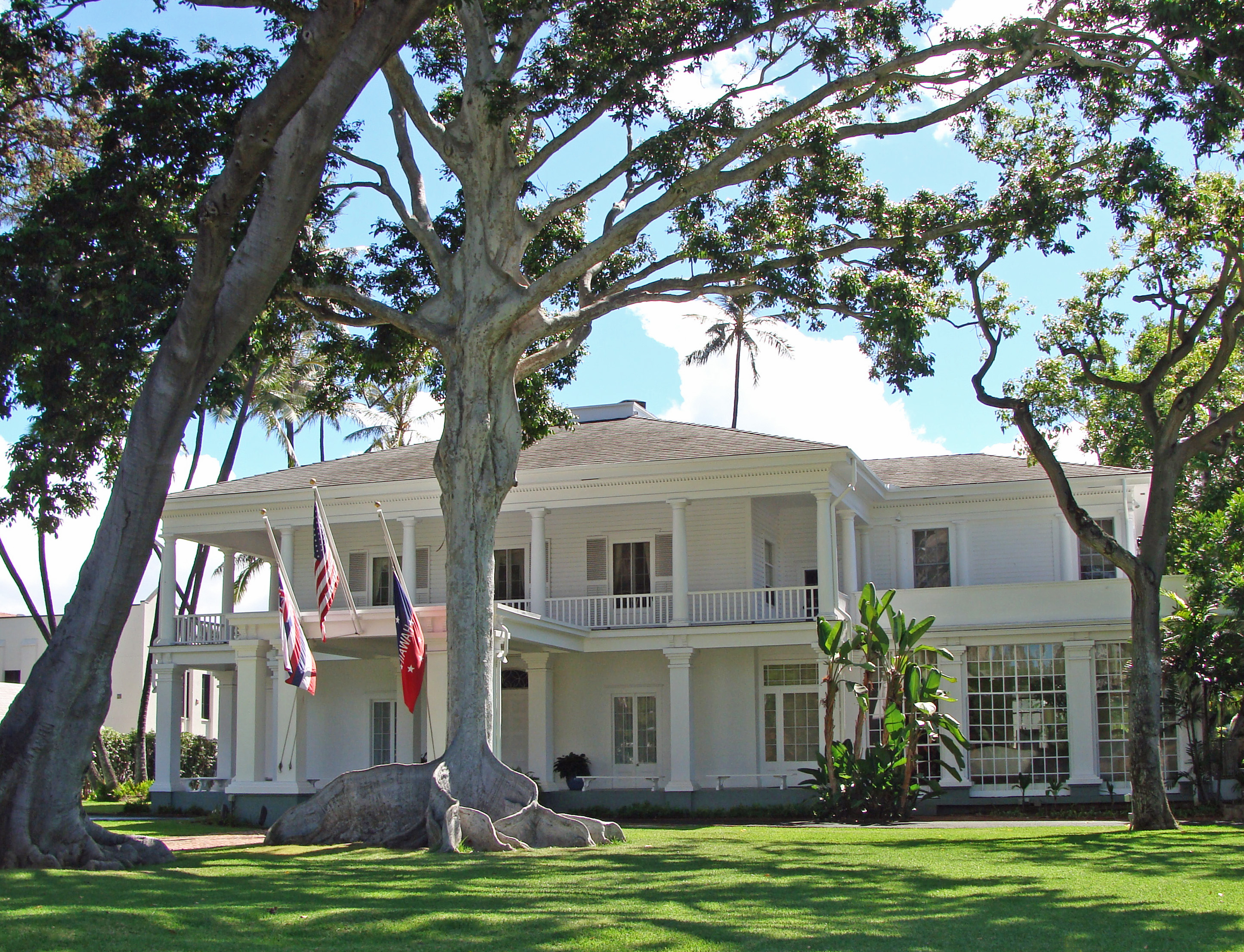
Washington Place, Liliʻuokalani's private residence inherited from her husband John Owen Dominis

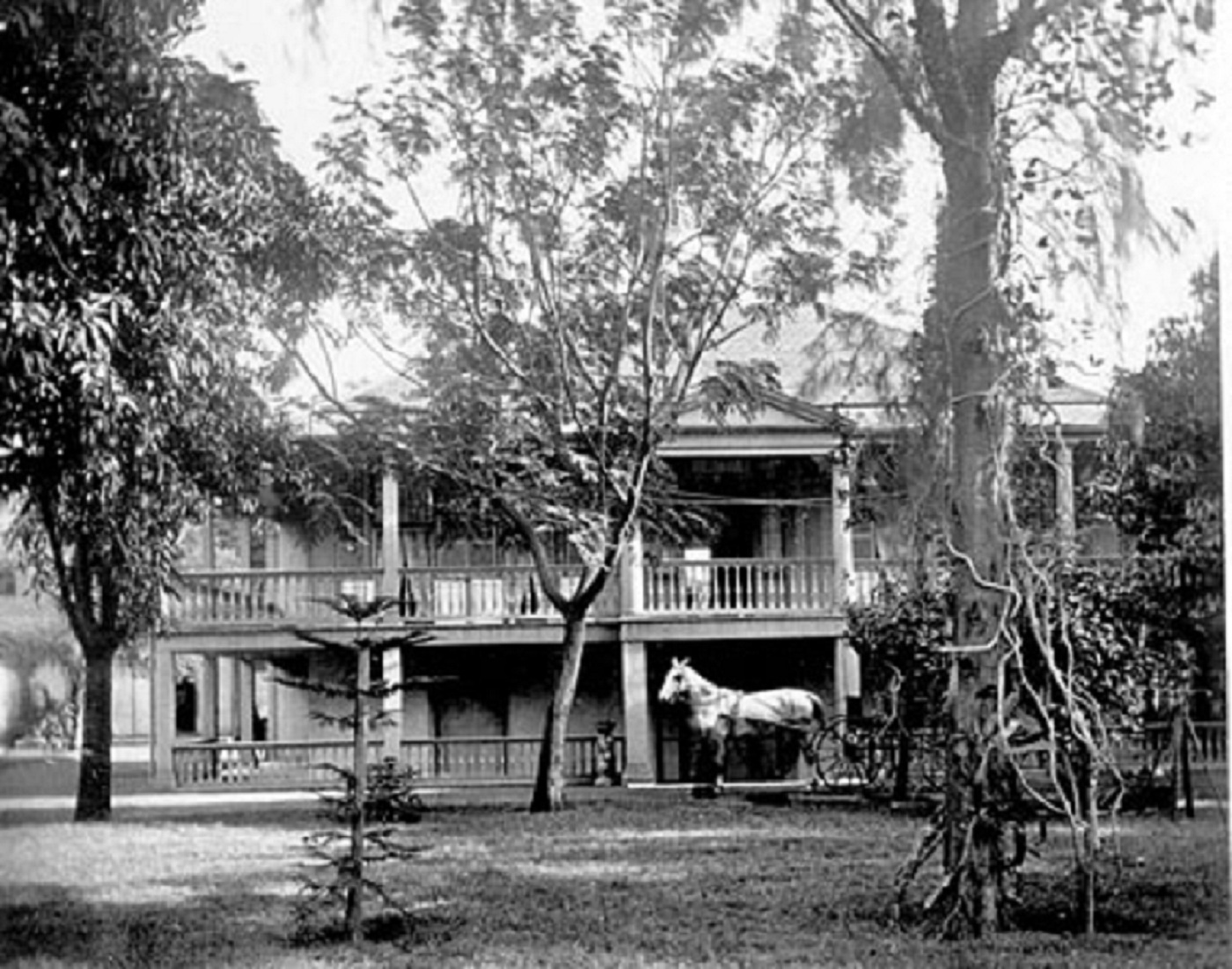
Rooke House, childhood home of Queen Emma

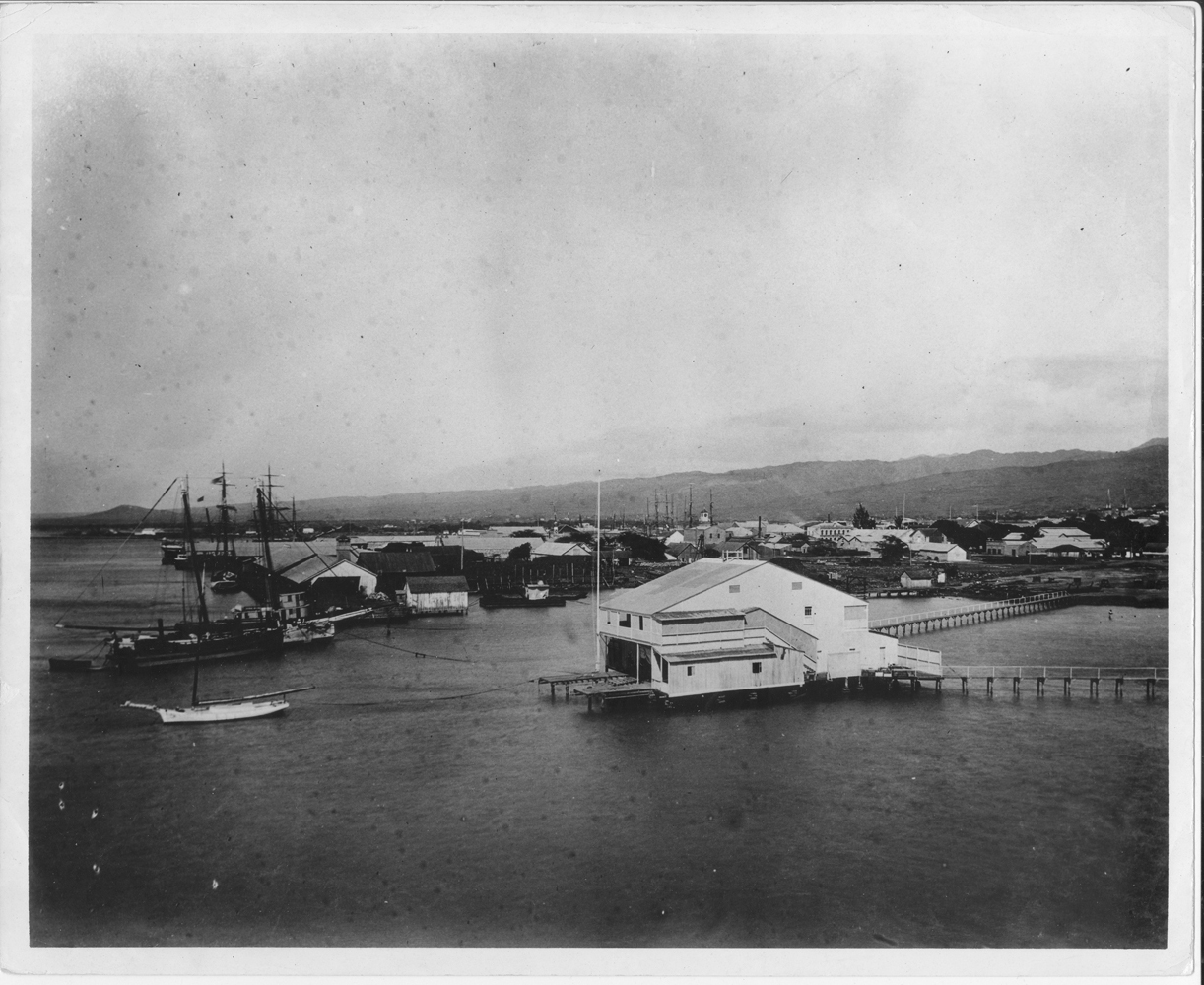
Healani, King Kalākaua's Boathouse where he spend a majority of his reign and where he entertained Robert Louis Stevenson

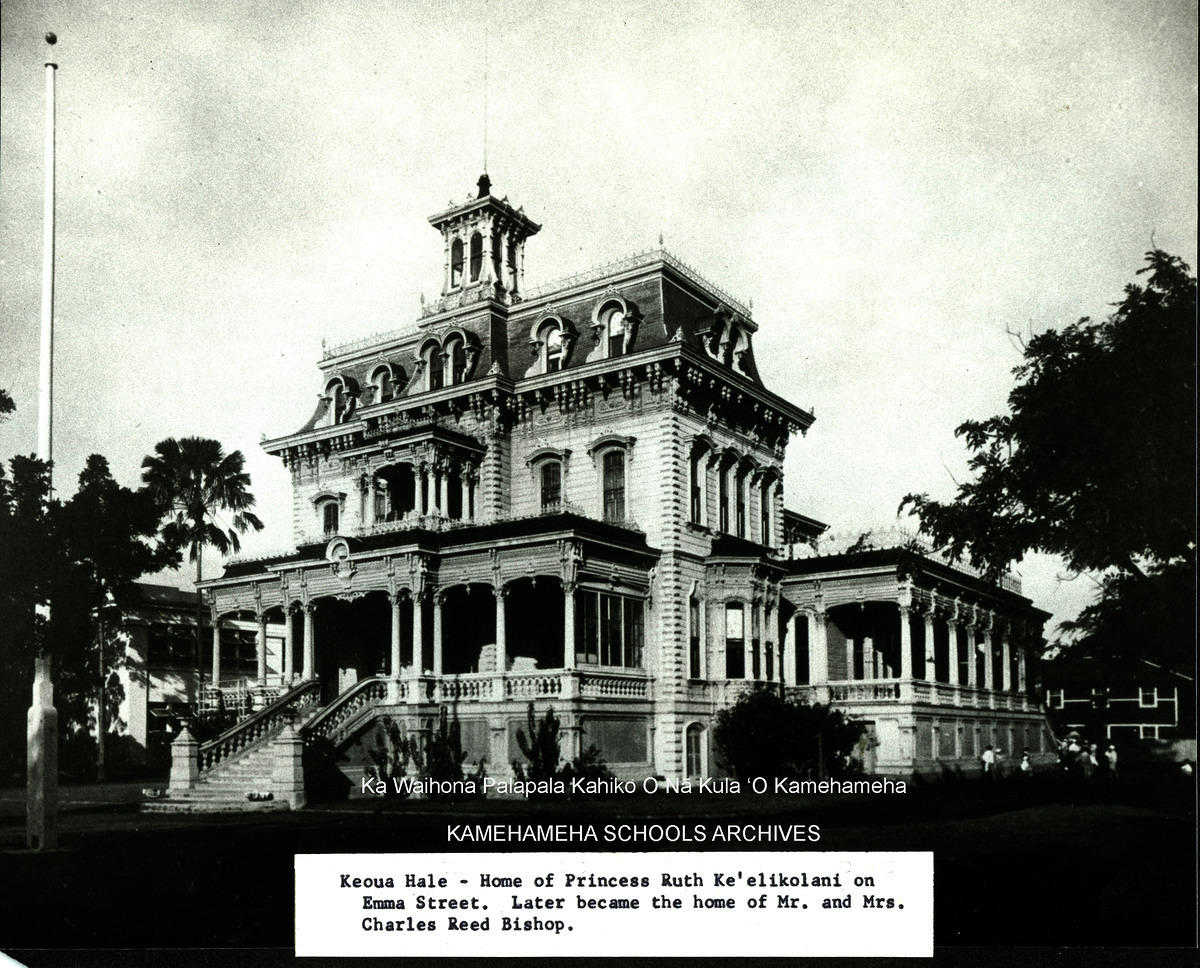
Keōua Hale, Keʻelikōlani's Honolulu residence which rivaled Kalakaua's Iolani Palace in size and granduer

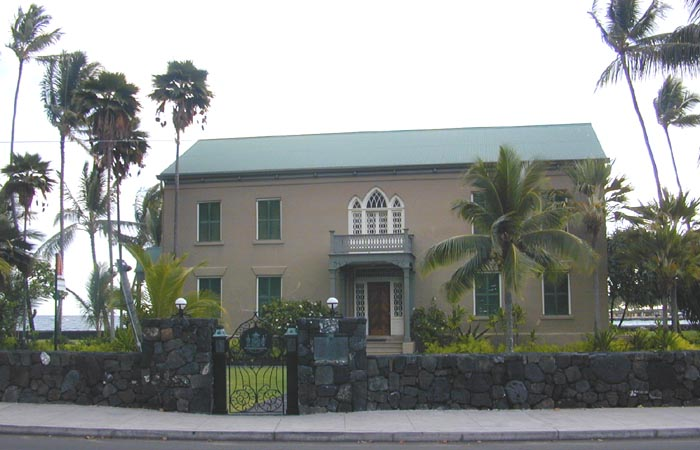
Huliheʻe Palace, Keʻelikōlani's residence in Kailua-Kona

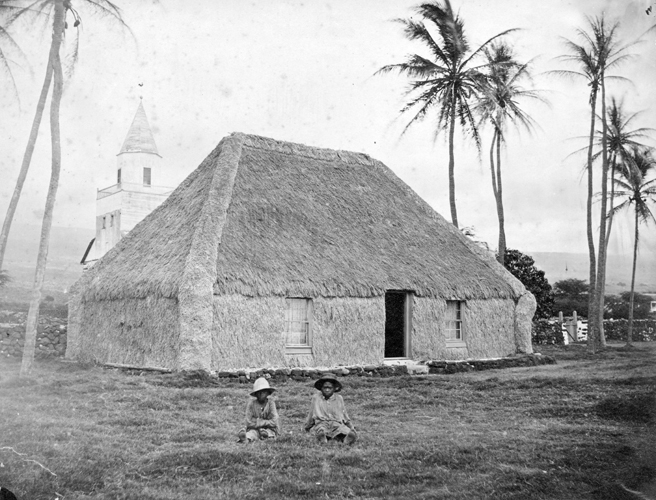
Grasshut on the grounds of Huliheʻe Palace where Keʻelikōlani much preferred to reside in

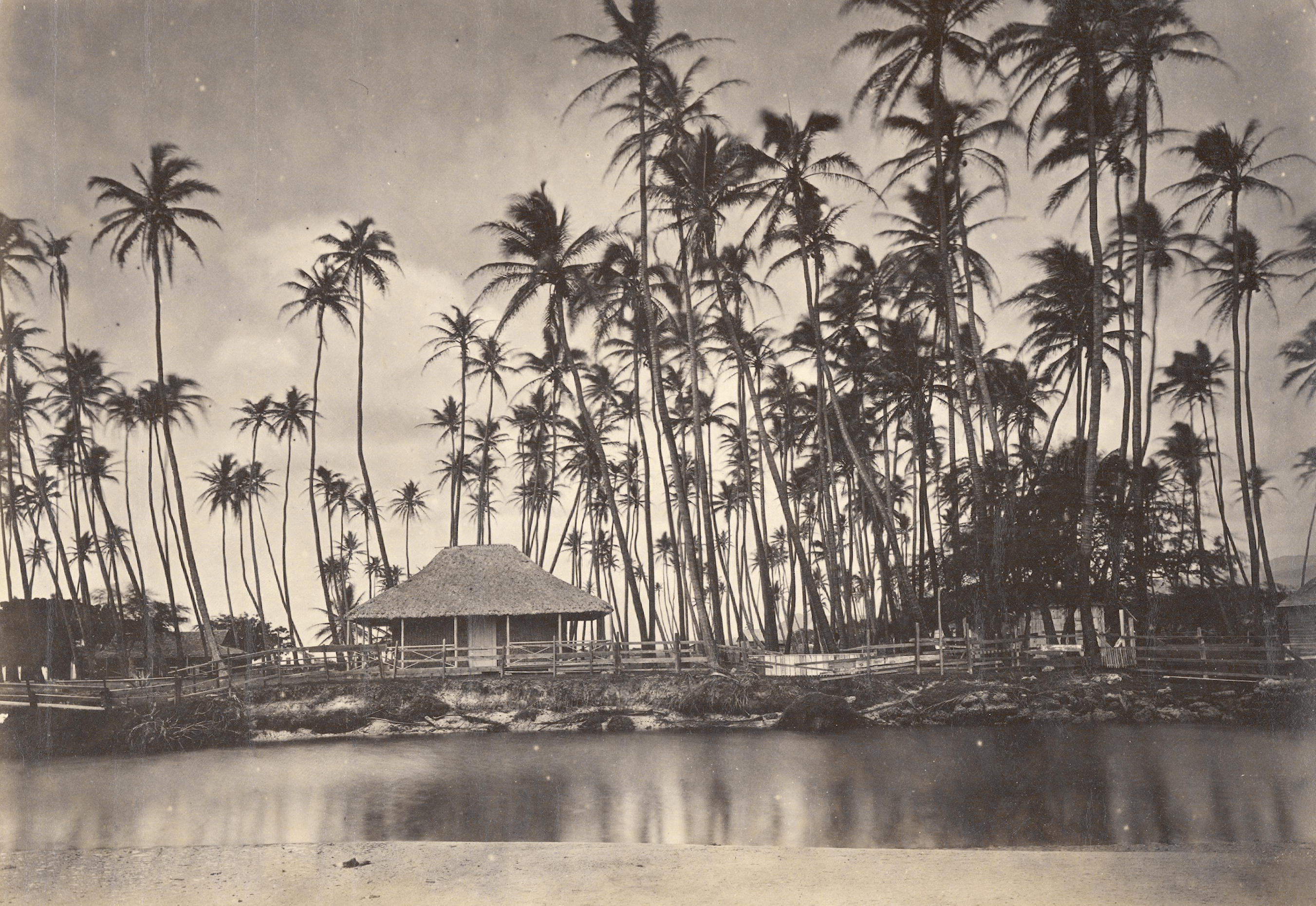
Heluma, King Kamehameha V's royal cottage amongst the sacred coconut groves

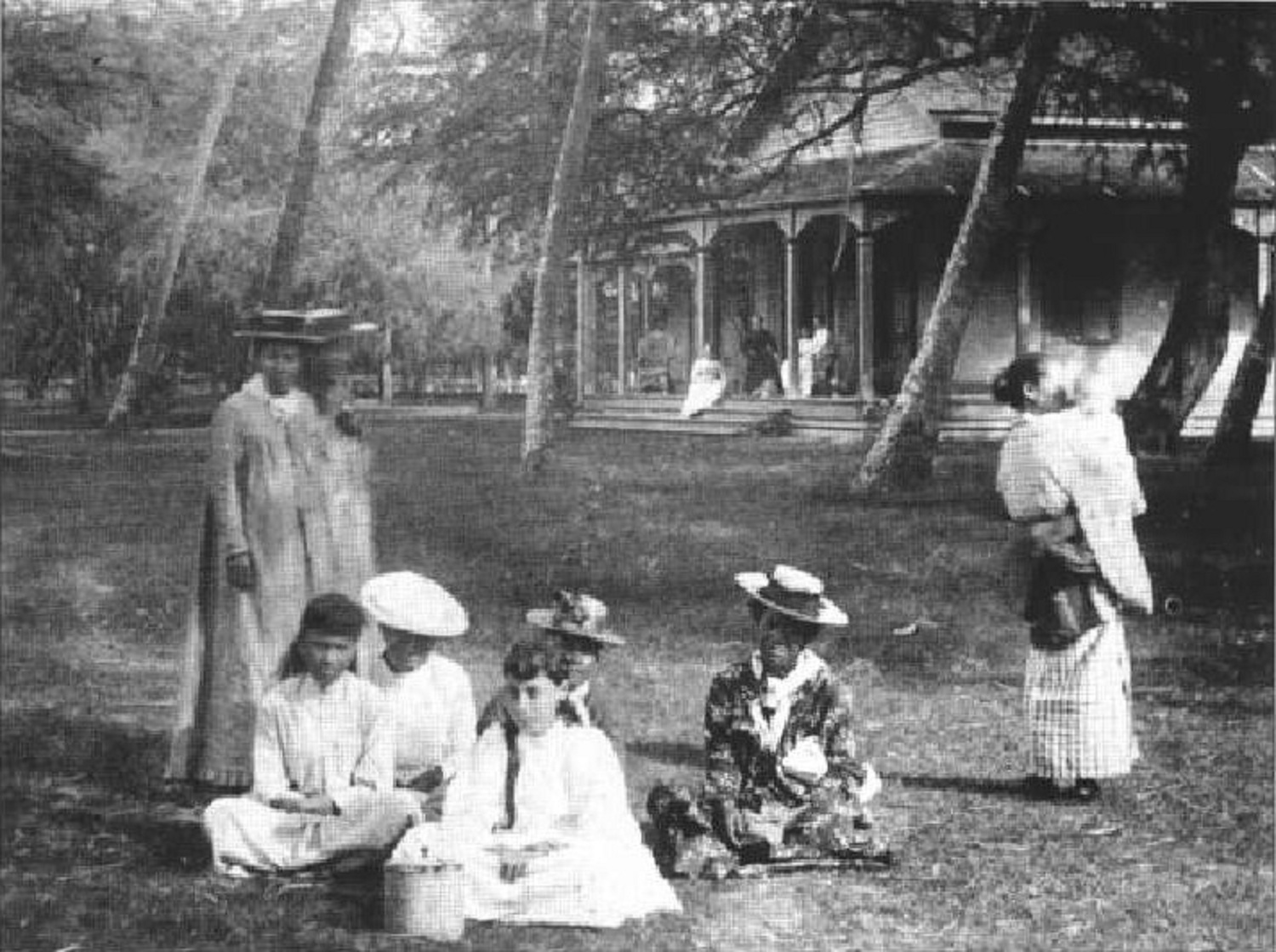
The Bishop's Waikiki residence

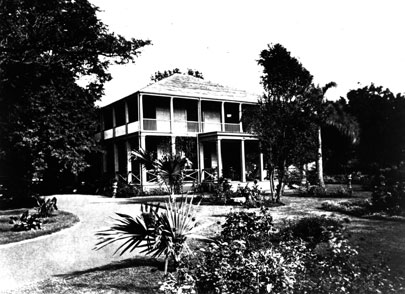
Residence built by Pākī for his family; Liliʻuokalani childhood home

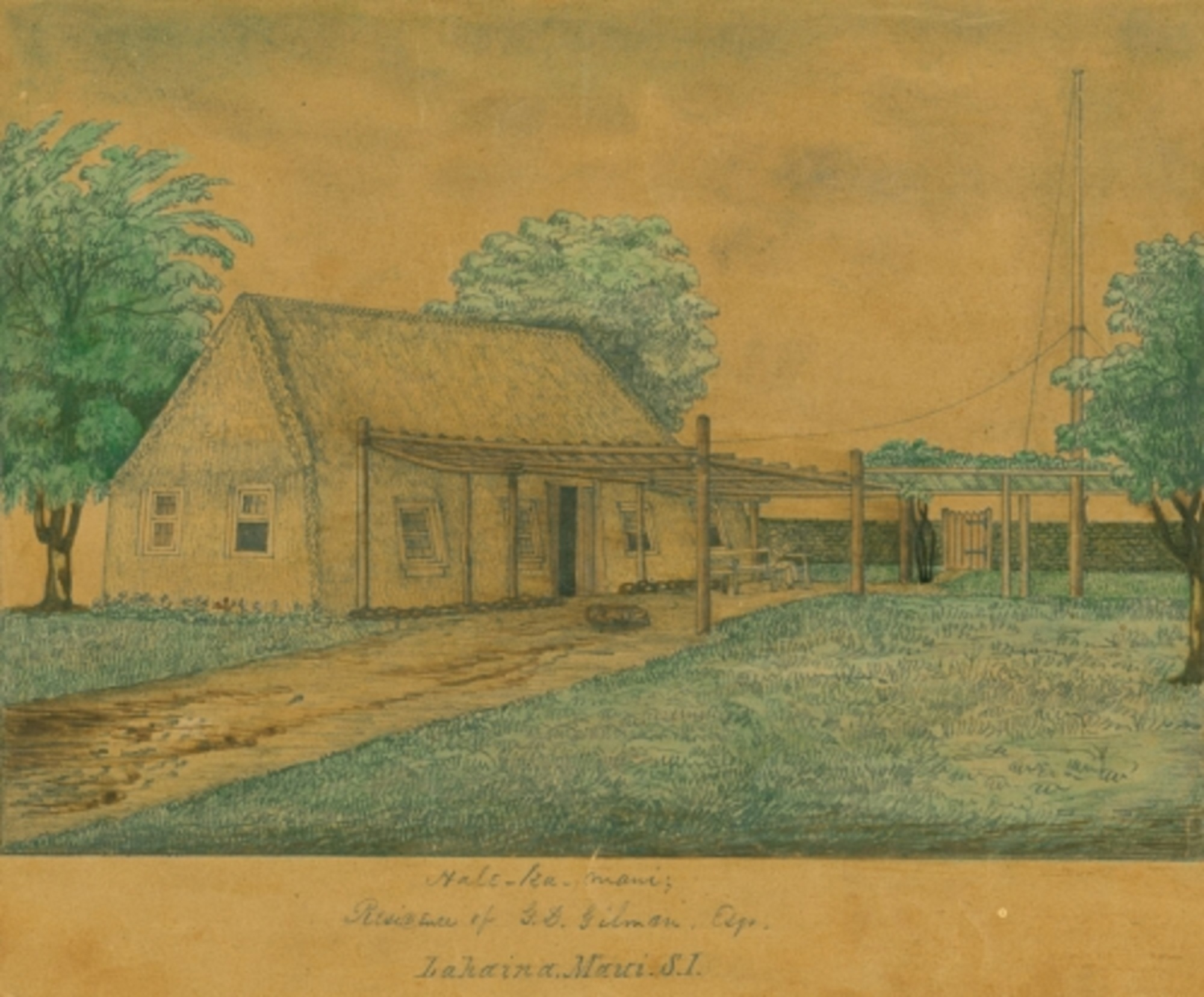
Halekamani, Princess Nāhiʻenaʻena's residence in Lāhainā

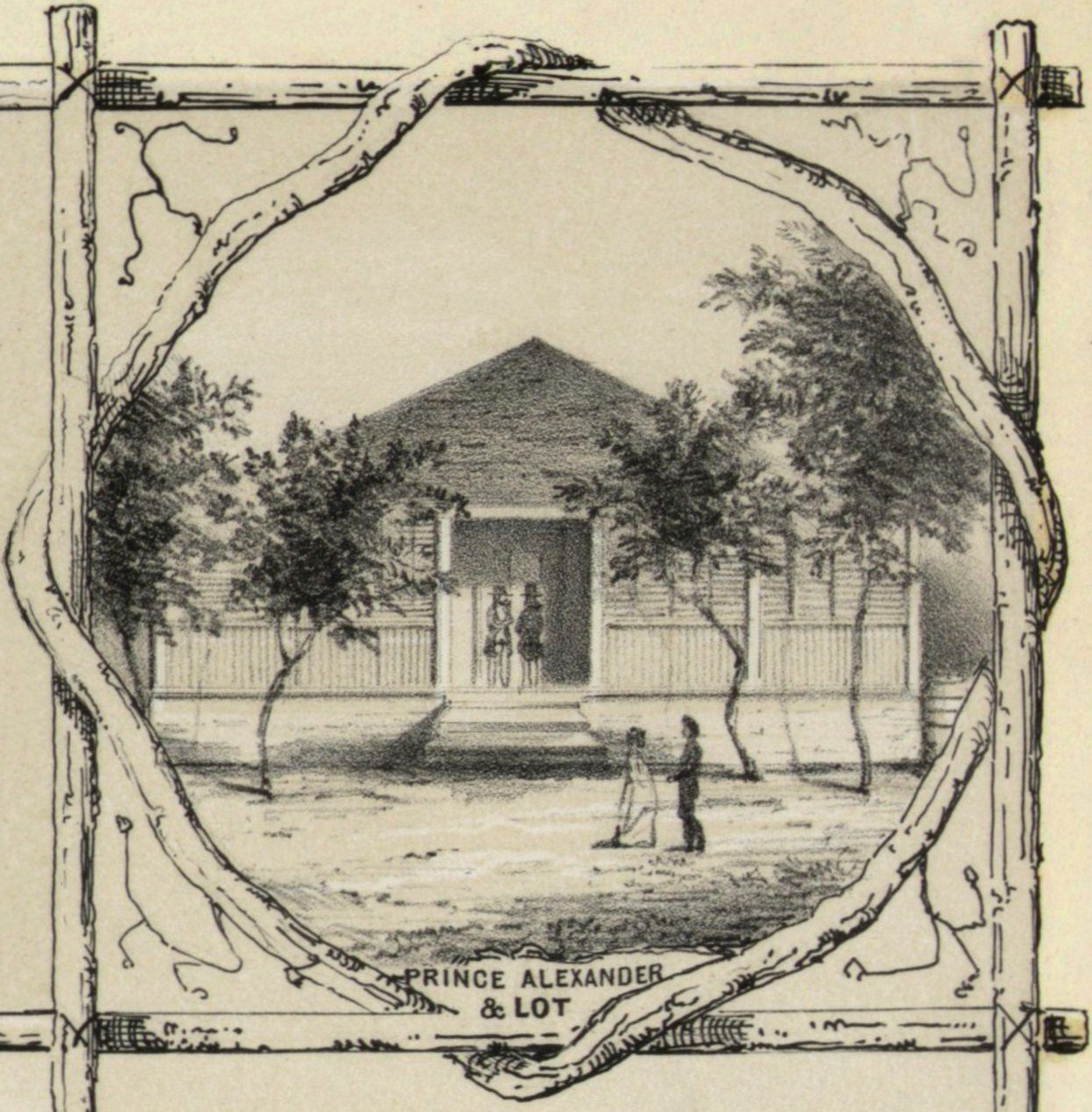
Hāliʻimaile, Princess Victoria Kamāmalu and Prince Lot Kapuāiwa's residence prior his accession as king

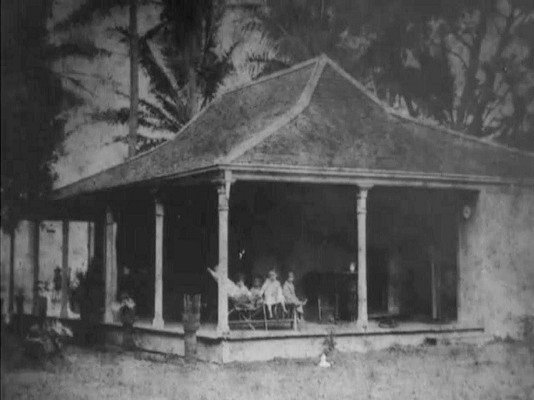
One of Queen Liliʻuokalani's Waikīkī residence at Hamohamo

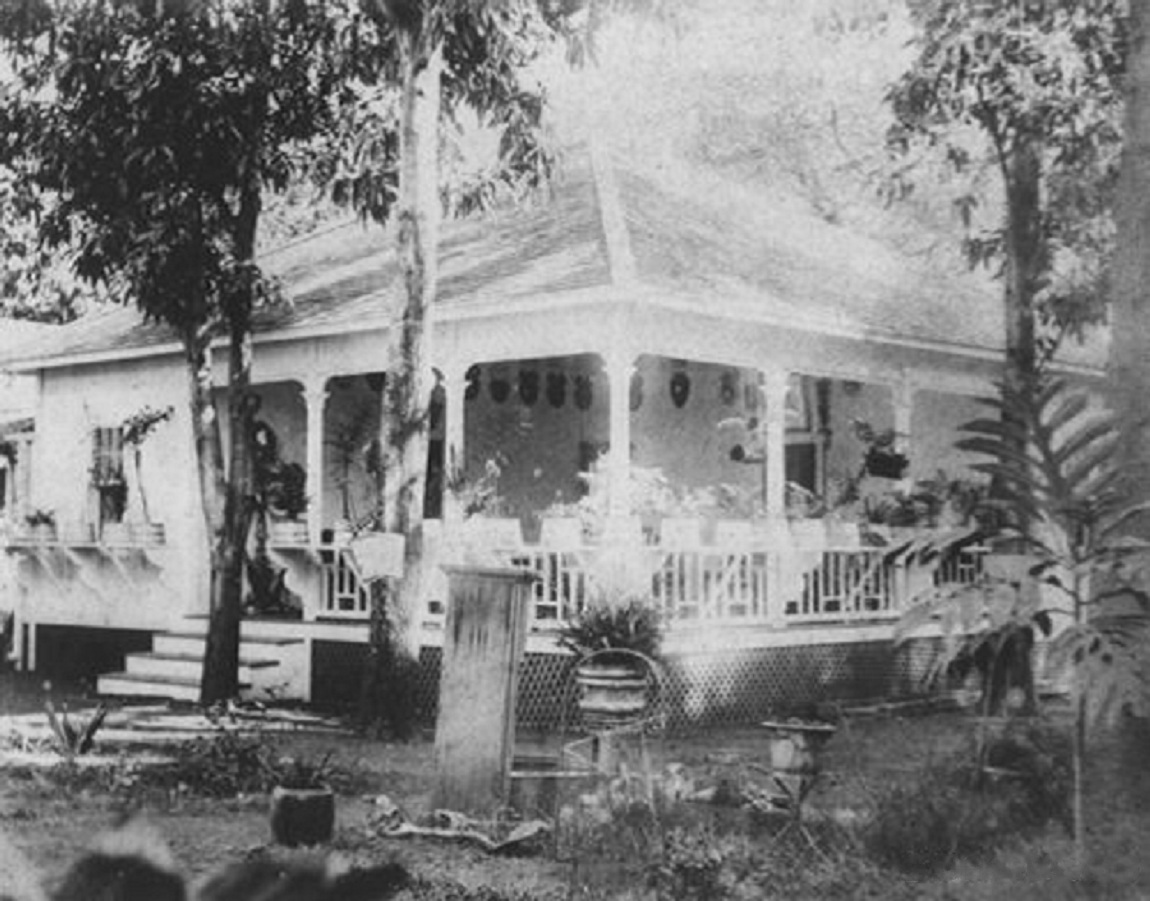
One of Liliʻuokalani's residences, unidentified

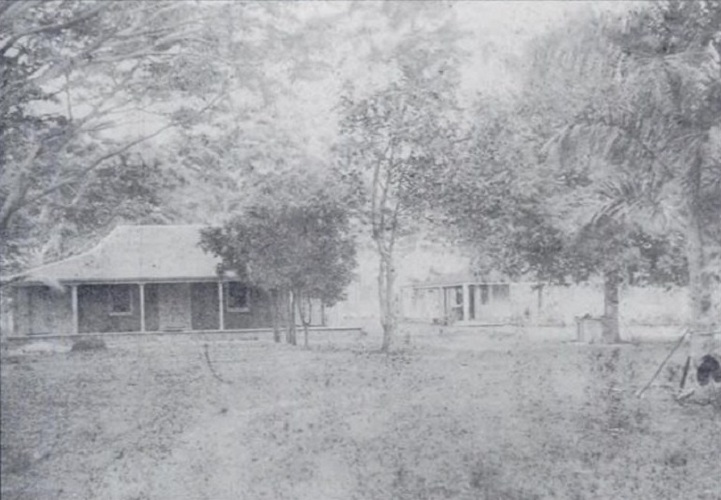
Paoakalani, Queen Liliʻuokalani's Waikīkī residence at Hamohamo

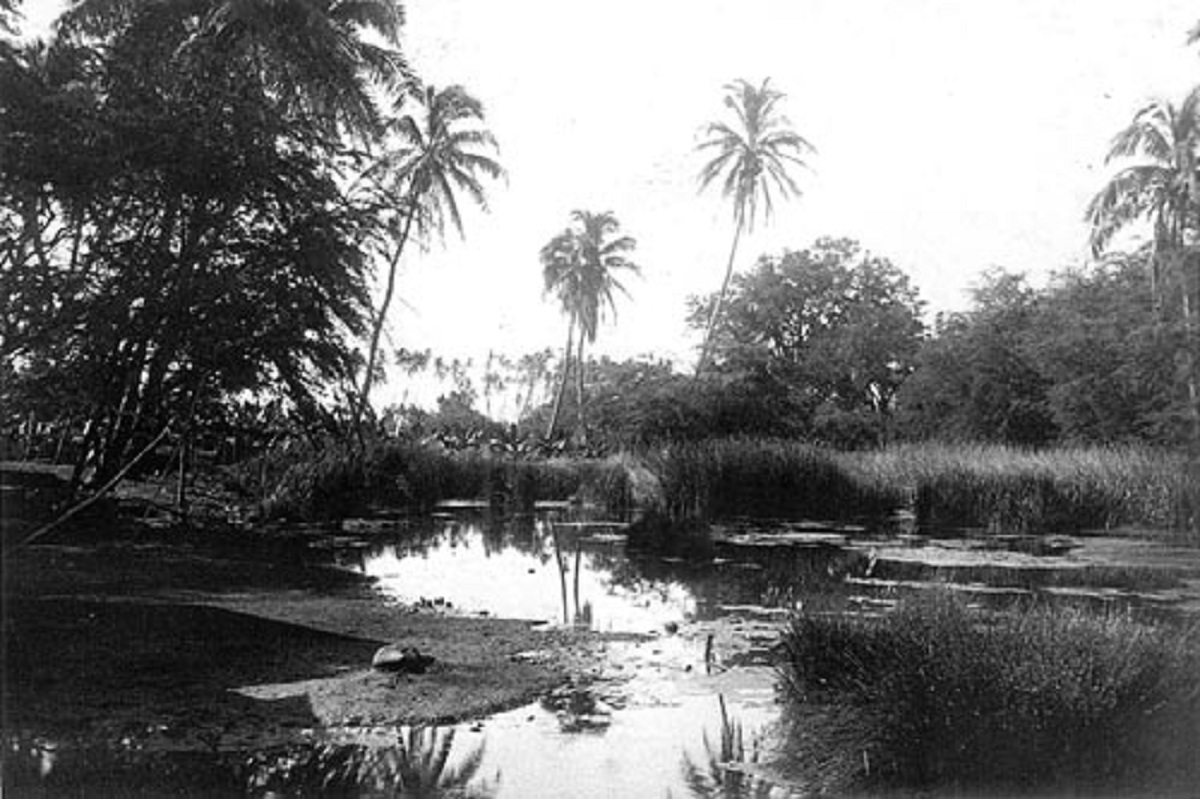
Mokuhinia the manmade lake upon which the island residence of Mokuʻula stood

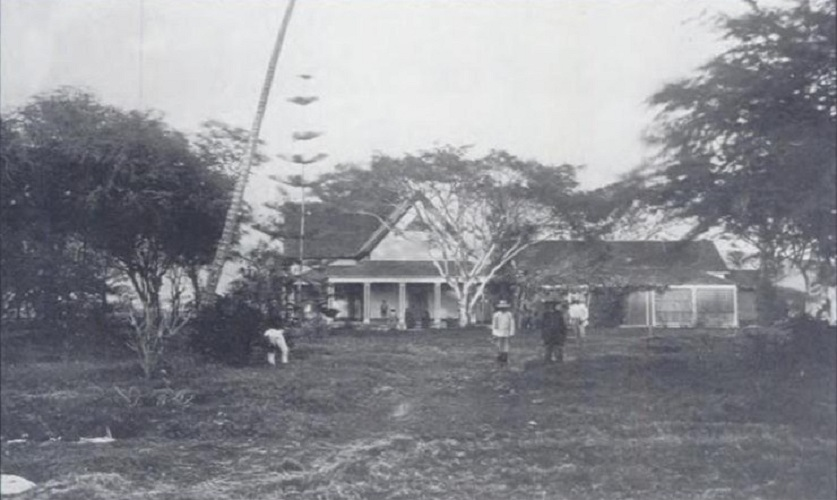
Queen Emma's Waikīkī residence probably the Marine Residence of Lunalilo

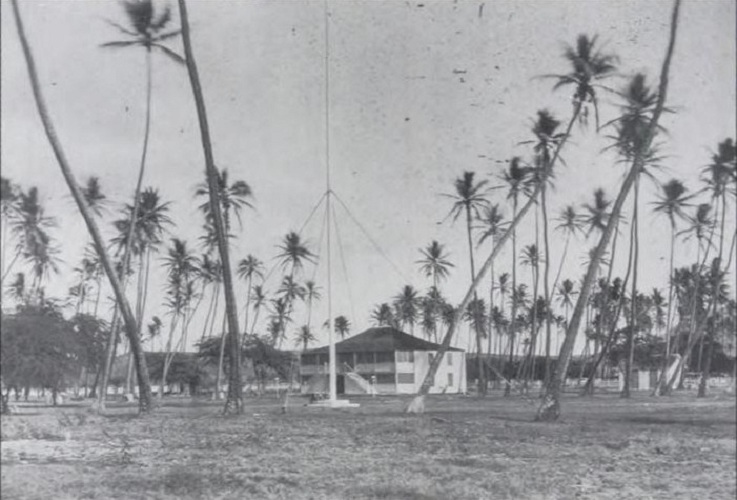
Queen Kapiʻolani's Waikīkī residence probably Pualeilani

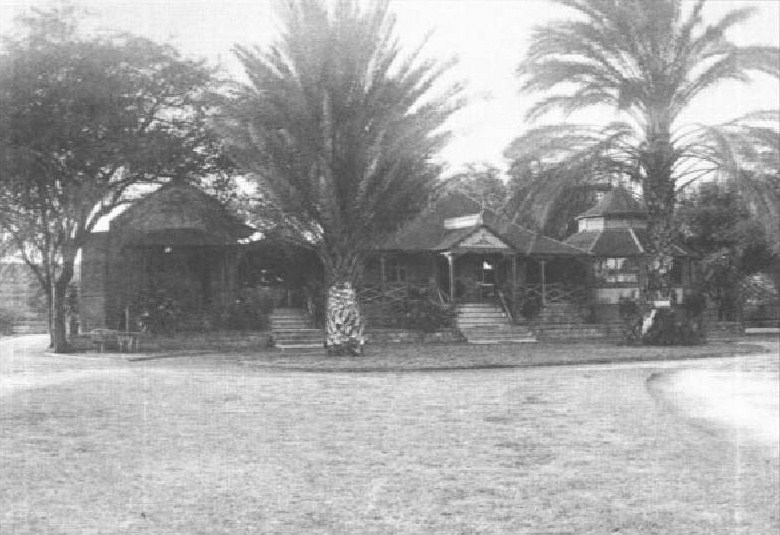
Kamehameha V Cottage, now the Moanalua Gardens

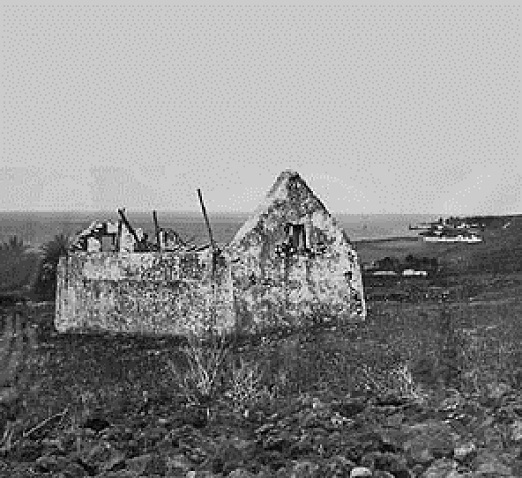
The ruins of John Young's house in Kawaihae where he raised his large family

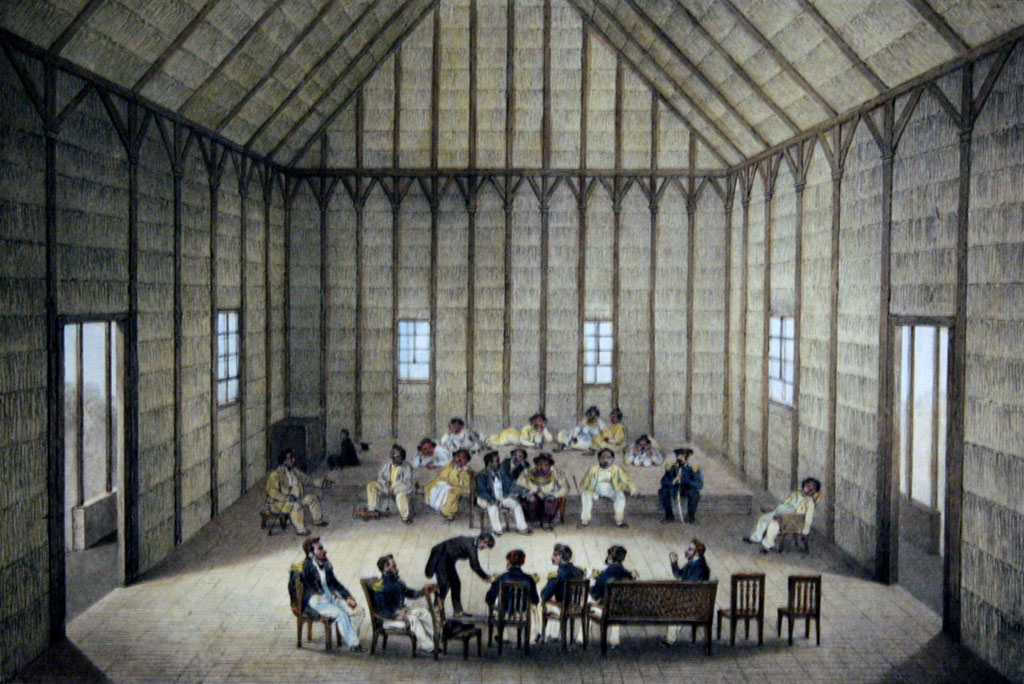
Hale Kauila in Honolulu

== Bibliography ==
- Fornander, Abraham (1880). Stokes, John F. G. (ed.). An Account of the Polynesian Race: Its Origins and Migrations, and the Ancient History of the Hawaiian People to the Times of Kamehameha I. Vol. 2. London: Trubner & Company. OCLC 4823096. Archived from the original on June 29, 2016.
- Judd, Walter F. (1975). Palaces and Forts of the Hawaiian Kingdom: From Thatch to American Florentine. Palo Alto, CA: Pacific Books, Publishers. ISBN 978-0-87015-216-0. OCLC 2073825.
- Kam, Ralph Thomas (2022). Lost Palaces of Hawaiʻi Royal Residences of the Kingdom Period. S. I.: McFarland, Incorporated, Publishers. ISBN 978-1-4766-8811-4. OCLC 1264273188.
- Kanahele, George S. (2002) [1986]. Pauahi: The Kamehameha Legacy. Honolulu: Kamehameha Schools Press. ISBN 978-0-87336-005-0. OCLC 173653971.
