= President William McKinley High School =

Public high school in Honolulu, Hawaii, United States

Location
- 1039 South King Street; Honolulu, Hawaii, 96814; United States

Information
- Type: Public high school
- Motto: Ike Makaukau Aloha
- Established: 1865
- School district: Honolulu District
- Principal: Ron Okamura
- Faculty: 89.50 (FTE)
- Grades: 9-12
- Enrollment: 1,502 (2022-23)
- Student to teacher ratio: 16.78
- Campus type: Urban
- Colors: Black and Gold
- Athletics: Oahu Interscholastic Association
- Team name: Tigers
- Rival: Farrington High School; Kaimuki High School; Roosevelt High School
- Accreditation: Western Association of Schools and Colleges
- Newspaper: The Pinion
- Yearbook: Black and Gold
- Endowment: McKinley High Foundation
- Military: United States Army JROTC
- Distinctions: National Register of Historic Places
- Website: mckinley.k12.hi.us
- McKinley High School
- U.S. National Register of Historic Places
- Location within Hawaii
- Location: 1039 S. King St., Honolulu, Hawaii
- Coordinates: 21°18′17″N 157°51′1″W
- Area: 8 acres (3.2 ha)
- Built: 1924
- Architect: Louis E. Davis; Vladimir Ossipoff
- Architectural style: Mission/Spanish Revival
- NRHP reference No.: 80001281
- Added to NRHP: August 11, 1980

President William McKinley High School, more commonly referred to as McKinley High School, is a comprehensive public high school in the Honolulu District of the Hawaii State Department of Education. It serves grades nine through twelve. McKinley is one of three schools in the Kaimuki-McKinley-Roosevelt Complex Area which includes Kaimuki High School and Roosevelt High School. It was founded as Fort Street English Day School in 1865. Later known as Honolulu High School, it was renamed in memorial to William McKinley, the twenty-fifth President of the United States, in 1907. President William McKinley High School is one of the oldest secondary schools in the state and several of its buildings have been listed on the National Register of Historic Places. The campus displays sculptures by Satoru Abe (1926–2025) and Bumpei Akaji (1921–2002). McKinley High School is accredited by the Western Association of Schools and Colleges.

== History ==
The high school was established in 1865 as the Fort Street English Day School and was founded by Maurice B. Beckwith. In November 1869, it was moved to Keōua Hale, the former palace of Princess Ruth Keʻelikōlani. In 1895, it was renamed to Honolulu High School. In 1907, it was moved to the corner of Beretania and Victoria Streets and renamed President William McKinley High School. It finally moved to its present campus on King Street in 1923.

On June 5, 1938, the school gave diplomas to 1,288 students, the largest number of diplomas in the history of the school.

=== Crosswalk incident ===
In February 2023, McKinley High School junior Sara Yara was killed in a hit and run after a driver ran her over on a crosswalk near the school. The driver was charged with negligent homicide, amongst other charges. As a result of the incident, speed bumps, raised crosswalks, and red light cameras were added around the school's vicinity.

== Academics ==
As of the 2023–2024 school year, the school is ranked #13 in Hawaii and #4,394 in national on the U.S. News & World Report. The school had a 44.4% advanced placement participation rate, with 20% passing the exam.

=== Graduation requirements ===
As of the 2023–2024 school year, the school requires six credits in Electives, four credits in English, four credits in Social Studies, three credits in Mathematics, three credits in Science, two credits in either Fine Arts, World Languages, or Career Technical Education/JROTC, one credit in Physical Education, a half credit in Health, and a half credit for the Personal Transition Plan (PTP), for a total of 24 credits.

=== Academy structure ===
The school utilizes a Smaller Learning Community (SLC) career academy structure, which places freshmen students into a single housed academy and allows them to choose a career academy for their sophomore through senior year. The career academies are the Academy of Health Sciences, the McKinley Business Academy, the Tiger Media Learning Center Academy, and the McKinley STEM Academy. The school also offers a Global Academy, which allows students to take electives that are not a part of an academy.

== Student demographics ==
School Year 2010-2011

- Enrollment - 1782
- Number of Economically Disadvantaged Students - 1026 (57.5%)

Racial composition:

- Native American - 9 (0.5%)
- Black - 12 (0.7%)
- Chinese - 449 (25.6%)
- Filipino - 347 (19.8%)
- Native Hawaiian - 173 (9.9%)
- Japanese - 163 (9.3%)
- Korean - 110 (6.3%)
- Portuguese - 10 (0.6%)
- Samoan - 72 (4.1%)
- Indo-Chinese - 151 (8.6%)
- Micronesian - 98 (5.6%)
- Tongan - 13 (0.7%)
- Guamanian/Chamorro - 8 (0.5%)
- White - 78 (4.5%)
- Other Asian - 10 (0.6%)
- Other Pacific Islander - 8 (0.5%)
- Pacific Islander (2 or more) - 1 (0.1%)
- Multiple (2 or more) - 4 (0.2%)

== Faculty ==
School Year 2001-2002

- Total number of teachers - 108
- Number of teachers with 5 or more years at this school - 85 (78.7%)
- Average years of experience - 18.1
- Number of teachers with advanced degrees - 32 (29.6%)

School Year 2010-2011

- Total number of teachers - 98
- Number of teachers with 5 or more years at this school - 69 (70%)
- Average years of experience - 17.2
- Number of teachers with advanced degrees - 42 (43%)

== Complex area information ==
McKinley High School is part of the Hawaii Department of Education Kaimuki-McKinley-Roosevelt Complex Area along with Kaimuki High School and Roosevelt High School.

=== McKinley Complex ===
The McKinley Complex consists of 11 elementary, middle, and public charter schools including McKinley.

- Central Middle School
- Halau Lokahi Public Charter School
- Kaahumanu Elementary School
- Kaiulani Elementary School
- Kauluwela Elementary School
- Lanakila Elementary School
- Likelike Elementary School
- Lunalilo Elementary School
- Myron B. Thompson Academy (Public Charter School)
- Royal Elementary School
- Voyager Public Charter School

=== Feeder Middle Schools ===
McKinley High School feeds primarily from 4 middle schools in the Honolulu area.

- Princess Ruth Keʻelikōlani Middle School
- Prince David Kawananakoa Middle School
- Robert Louis Stevenson Middle School
- President George Washington Middle School

== Extracurricular activities ==
=== Clubs ===
The school offers a variety of clubs. Notable clubs based on organizations include CyberPatriot, DECA, National FFA Organization, and HOSA. Notable service clubs include Key Club and Leo Club.

=== Athletics ===
McKinley competes in the Oahu Interscholastic Association. As of the 2024–2025 school year, McKinley has 56 teams competing in 19 sports. These sports include cheerleading, cross country running, football, volleyball, soft tennis, bowling, air riflery, softball, basketball, soccer, swimming, golf, wrestling, canoe paddling, baseball, tennis, judo, boys' volleyball, track and field, water polo, and flag football.

McKinley has fielded girls' teams in basketball, volleyball, and swimming as early as in the 1910s. Some years even fielded girls' baseball team before softball became recognized as its own sport. The yearbooks of those early years noted games often against St. Andrew's Priory, YWCA, Palama, Normal School (later merged with University of Hawaiʻi's College of Education), and even College of Hawaii (now known as University of Hawaiʻi). McKinley was a founding member of the Interscholastic League of Honolulu in 1909 alongside Punahou and Kamehameha. In 1970, McKinley left the ILH with four other Honolulu area public schools to join the Oahu Interscholastic Association.

The 1933 football team traveled across the Pacific Ocean and went on to defeat Weber College (now known as Weber State University), Brigham Young University freshmen team, and Ricks College (now known as Brigham Young University–Idaho). Ricks College traveled to Honolulu the following year. McKinley won again by the score of 24–6 in a game attended by about 19,000 fans.

==== Football ====
The McKinley Tigers varsity football team competes in the Oahu Interscholastic Association Division 2 under Head Coach Adam Treine-Aea.

In September 2012, the McKinley football team traveled to Corvallis, Oregon to play the OSAA 4A champions La Salle High School Falcons on the campus of Crescent Valley High School. McKinley won 43–22.

In 2024, McKinley broke ground for a new 2,400-seat stadium to be built on their current athletic complex which was previously renovated in 2017 to include an artificial track and turf field. The new stadium will also include new locker rooms and coaching facilities. McKinley's football team previously used Roosevelt High School's Ticky Vasconcellos Stadium.

===== Season records =====
Season	Head coach	Record	Division	Notes
2010	Joseph Cho	4-4-0 / 4-5-0	OIA White	Did not qualify for OIA White play-offs.
2011	Joseph Cho	5-3-0 / 6-4-0	OIA White	Finished ranked 4th in Division after losing in semi-final play-off versus Pearl City.
2012	Joseph Cho	3-3-0 / 4-5-0	OIA Red-East	Finished ranked 4th in Division after losing in wild card play-off versus Campbell.
2013	Joseph Cho	3-3-0 / 5-5-0	OIA Red-East	Finished ranked 3rd in Division after losing in quarter final play-off versus Campbell.
2014	Joseph Cho	1-1-0 / 1-4-0	OIA Red-East	Did not qualify for OIA Red-East play-offs.
2015	Joseph Cho	0-2-0 / 0-5-0	OIA Red	Did not qualify for OIA Red play-offs.
2016	Joseph Cho	0-3-0 / 0-4-0	OIA White	Did not qualify for OIA White play-offs.
2017	Joseph Cho	1-5-0 / 1-6-0	OIA White	Did not qualify for OIA White play-offs.
2018	Joseph Cho	3-5-1 / 4-5-1	OIA Division II	Did not qualify for OIA Division II play-offs.
2019	Joseph Cho	1-8-0 / 1-9-0	OIA Division II	Did not qualify for OIA Division II play-offs.
2020	Joseph Cho	/ -	OIA Division II	Season impacted by COVID-19 pandemic; no games played.
2021	Joseph Cho	0-8-0 / 0-8-0	OIA Division II	Did not qualify for OIA Division II play-offs.
2022	Joseph Cho	0-7-0 / 0-8-0	OIA Division II	Did not qualify for OIA Division II play-offs.
2023	Joseph Cho	0-9-0 / 0-9-0	OIA Division II	Did not qualify for OIA Division II play-offs.

==== McKinley Athletic Complex ====
In September 2008, it was announced that McKinley was planning to upgrade its aging athletic facilities. Expected to cost more than $121 million, the upgrade has 14 elements including a 1,200 stall parking lot, construction of a second gym, renovation of the current gym, construction of a girls softball stadium, construction of a baseball stadium, construction of a 50-meter swimming pool, and construction of a 10,000 seat football stadium. In December 2024, the school broke ground on the Athletic Complex.

In 2011, ground was broken on the softball stadium. When completed, the softball stadium would be designated as the OIA softball championship field; The stadium was completed in 2015.

==== Championships ====
OIA TITLES
Sport	Championship Years
Baseball	1976, 1978
Basketball (girls)	1988, 1995, 1996, 1997, 2007, 2008
Bowling (boys)	1994
Bowling (girls)	1976, 1977, 1981, 1982, 1983
Cross Country (boys)	1988, 1989, 2001
Cross Country (girls)	1989
Judo (boys)	1983, 1989, 1993,
Soft Tennis (boys)	2012, 2013
Soft Tennis (girls)	2013
Soccer (boys)	1973, 1974, 1975, 1976, 1977
Track & Field (boys)	1989
Volleyball (boys)	1976, 2012
Volleyball (girls)	1991, 1994, 1996
Wrestling (boys)	1972, 1996, 1997, 1999
Wrestling (girls)	1998, 1999

STATE TITLES
Sport	Championship Years
Basketball (boys)	2007
Basketball (girls)	2011
Bowling (boys)	1974, 1994
Bowling (girls)	1982, 1983, 1984
Judo (girls)	2007
Soccer (boys)	1978
Wrestling (girls)	1998

== Noted alumni ==
Listed alphabetically by last name (year of graduation):

- Satoru Abe (born 1926–2025), sculptor
- Joseph Kaiponohea ʻAeʻa (1882–1914), former hānai son of Queen Liliʻuokalani
- Abraham Akaka, former minister and proponent of statehood for Hawaii
- George Ariyoshi (1944), former governor of Hawaiʻi (1974–1986) and first Japanese-American to serve as U.S. governor
- Gladys Kamakakuokalani Brandt, educator and civic leader
- Larry Buenafe (1988), Sergeant Major (retired), U.S. Marine Corps, Highly decorated Marine, who was awarded the Legion of Merit Medal, by the President and 4 Meritorious service medal, who Served 4 Combat tour to Iraq, and 2 Combat tour to Afghanistan .
- William Y. Chang, founder of The Chinese-American Times newspaper
- Tammy Duckworth (1985), U.S. Army Major, Iraq War veteran, former U.S. Representative, and U.S. Senator from Illinois
- Hiram L. Fong (1924), former U.S. senator (1959–1977)
- Harry "Fuji" Fujiwara (1949), former pro wrestler known as Mr. Fuji
- Leina'ala Kalama Heine (1958), kumu hula
- Yuna Ito (2001), J-pop singer
- Daniel Inouye (1942), former member of U.S. Army's 442nd Regimental Combat Team in World War II who rescued a Texas battalion surrounded by German forces in a battle known as the rescue of "The Lost Battalion", Medal of Honor recipient; U.S. Representative (1959–1962); U.S. Senator (1962–2012). President pro tempore of the United States Senate, fourth-highest-ranking member of the U.S. government
- Dwayne "The Rock" Johnson (1986–1987, freshman and sophomore year only), actor and former professional wrestler
- Sam Kahaʻieuanalio Kaʻai, master wood carver and recognized Living Treasure of Hawaii
- Duke P. Kahanamoku, former Olympic gold medalist in swimming in 1912 and 1920
- Benny Kalama, musician and falsetto singer
- Keichi Kimura (1932), artist
- Wah Kau Kong (ca. 1937), first Chinese-American fighter pilot in World War II
- Ford Konno (1952), four-time medal winner in swimming at the 1952 and 1956 Olympic Games, including two gold medals and two silver medals, set Olympic record in the 1500m free
- Arthur Lyman (1951), former jazz vibraphonist
- Masaji Marumoto (1924), former Hawaii Supreme Court judge
- Fujio Matsuda (1942), educator
- Edith Kawelohea McKinzie (1925–2014), author, genealogist, and traditional hula expert
- Leroy A. Mendonca (1950), U.S. Army sergeant killed in combat in the Korean War, Medal of Honor recipient
- Johnny Naumu (1919–1982), American football player
- Alice Sae Teshima Noda (1894–1964), entrepreneur
- Frederick Pang (1954), former U.S. Assistant Secretary of the Navy
- Paul Schrier (1985), actor
- Alfred H. Song (1936–2004), former California State Assemblyman and State Senator
- John Chin Young (1909–1997), former artist

== Architecture gallery ==
The architect most involved in the early layout of the King Street campus and design of its Spanish Colonial Revival buildings was Louis E. Davis. The original quadrangle was placed on the National Register of Historic Places in 1980.

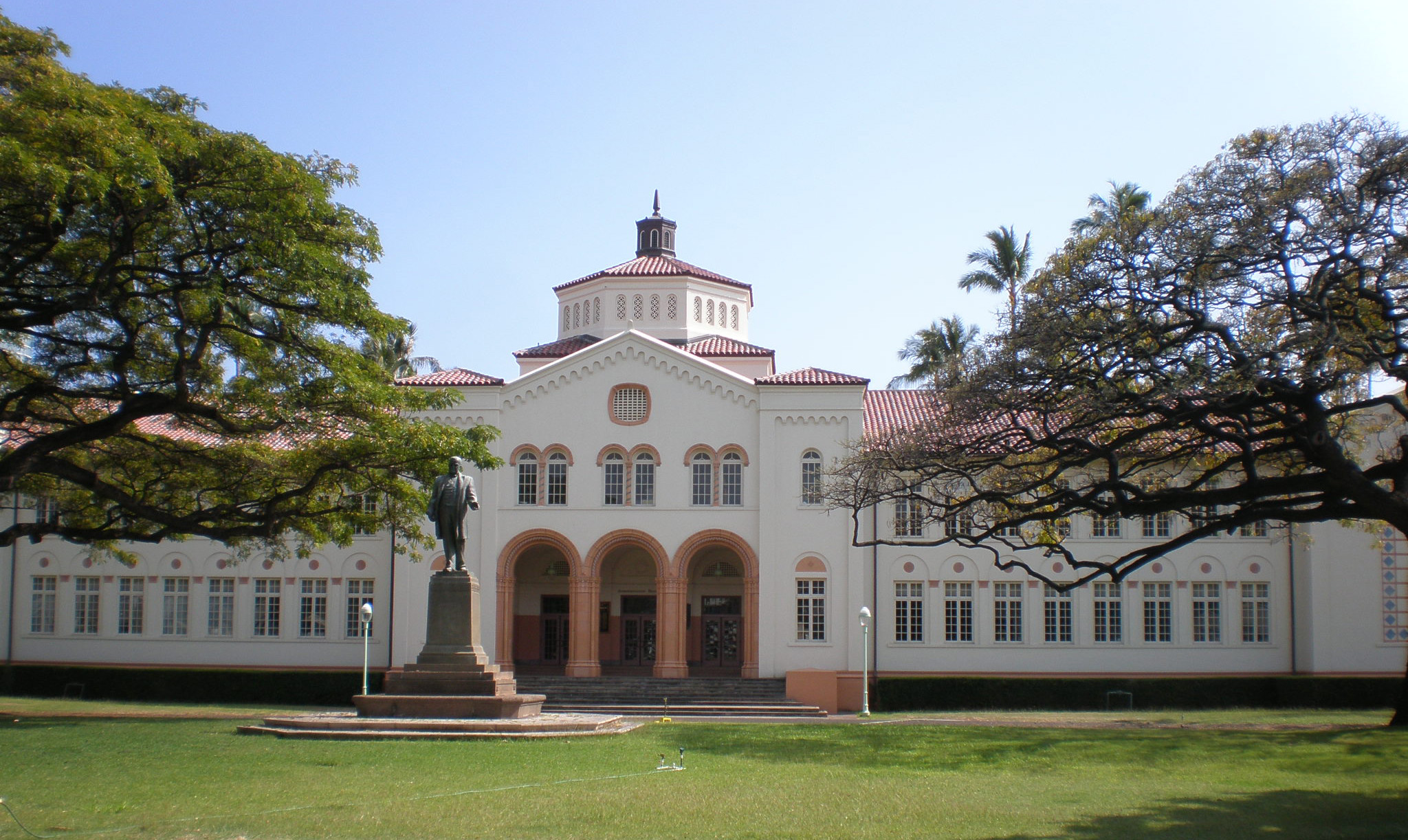
Statue and main administration building

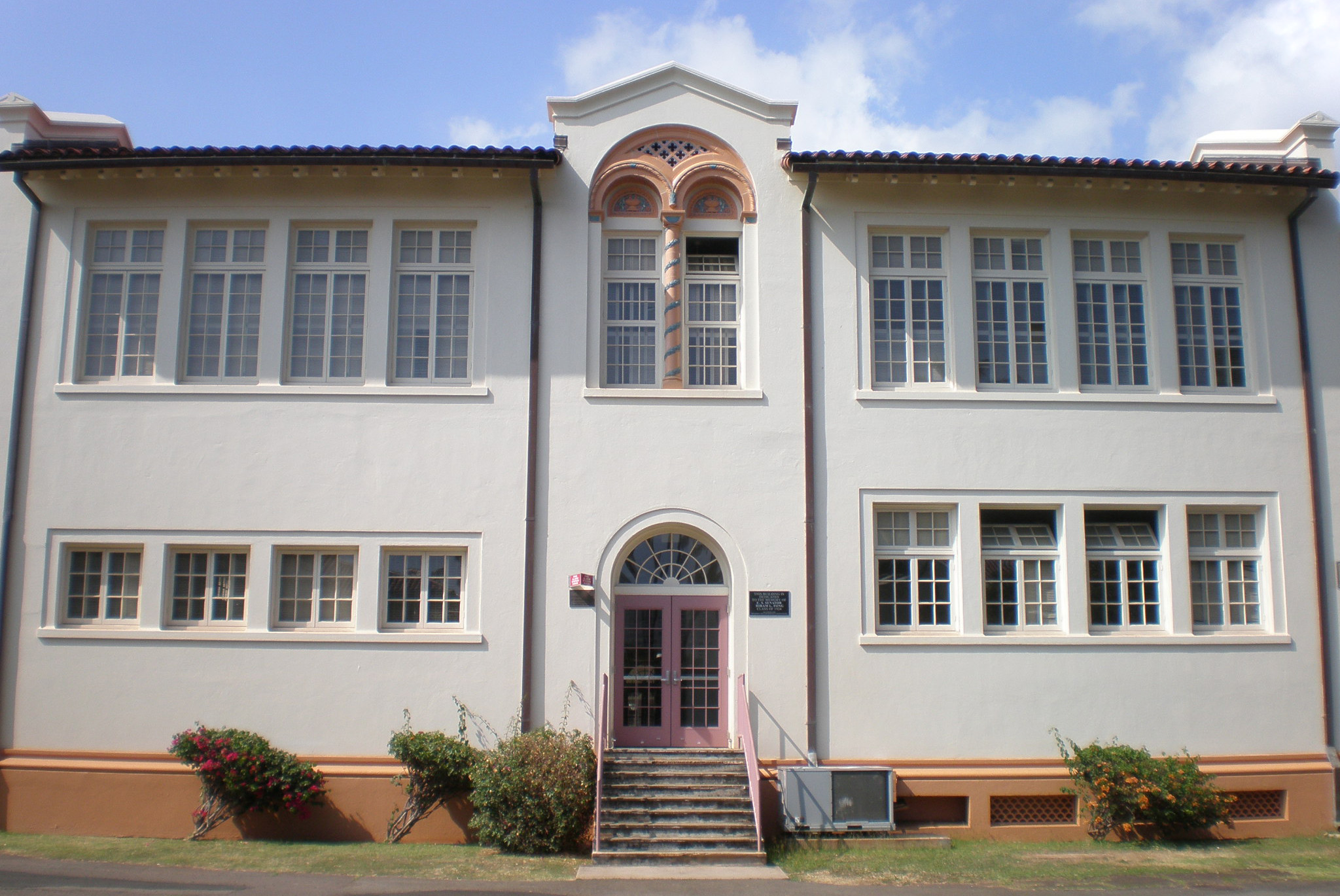
Commercial building (B), with NRHP and Hiram Fong plaques

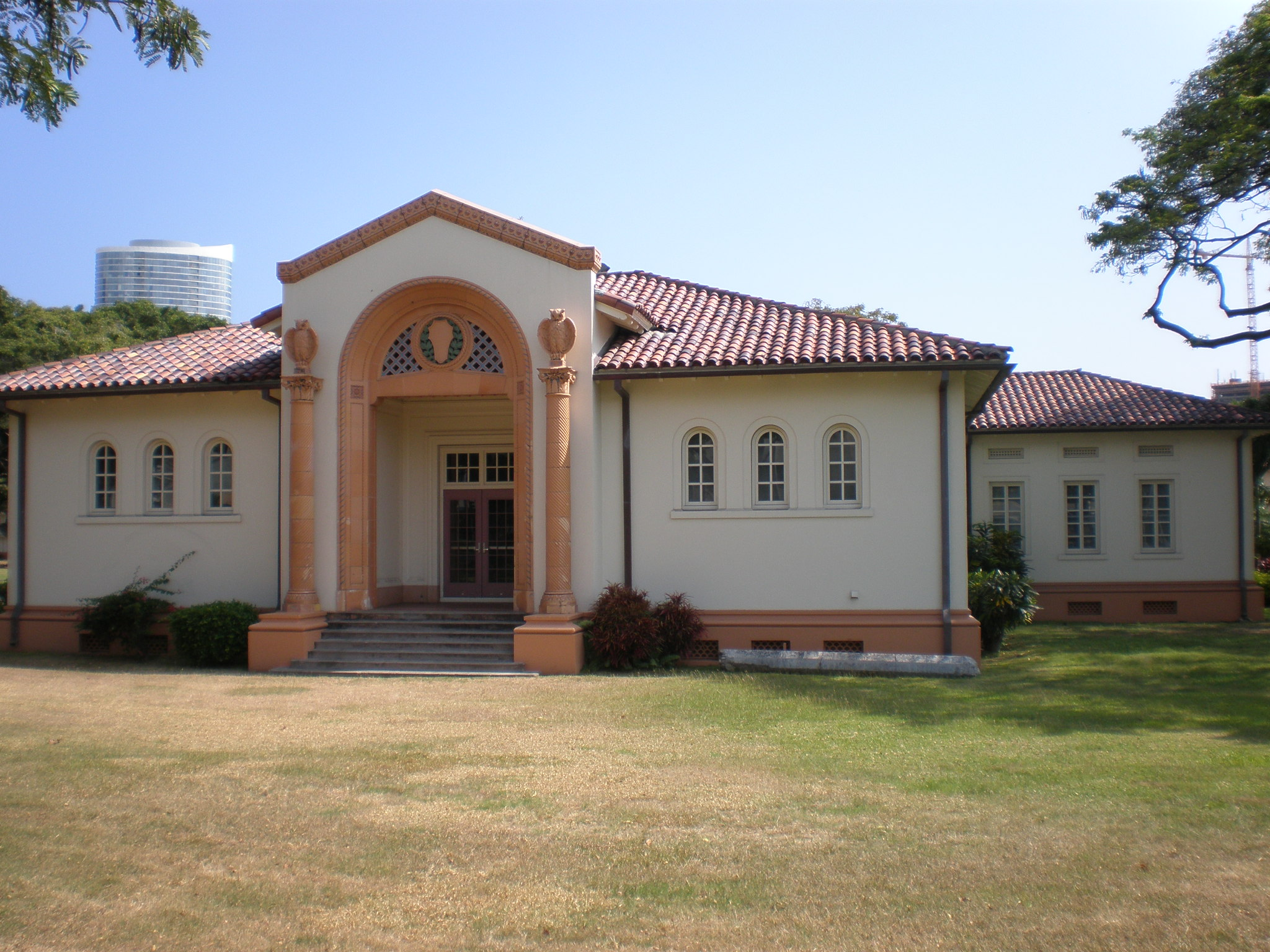
Art building (D), with owl columns

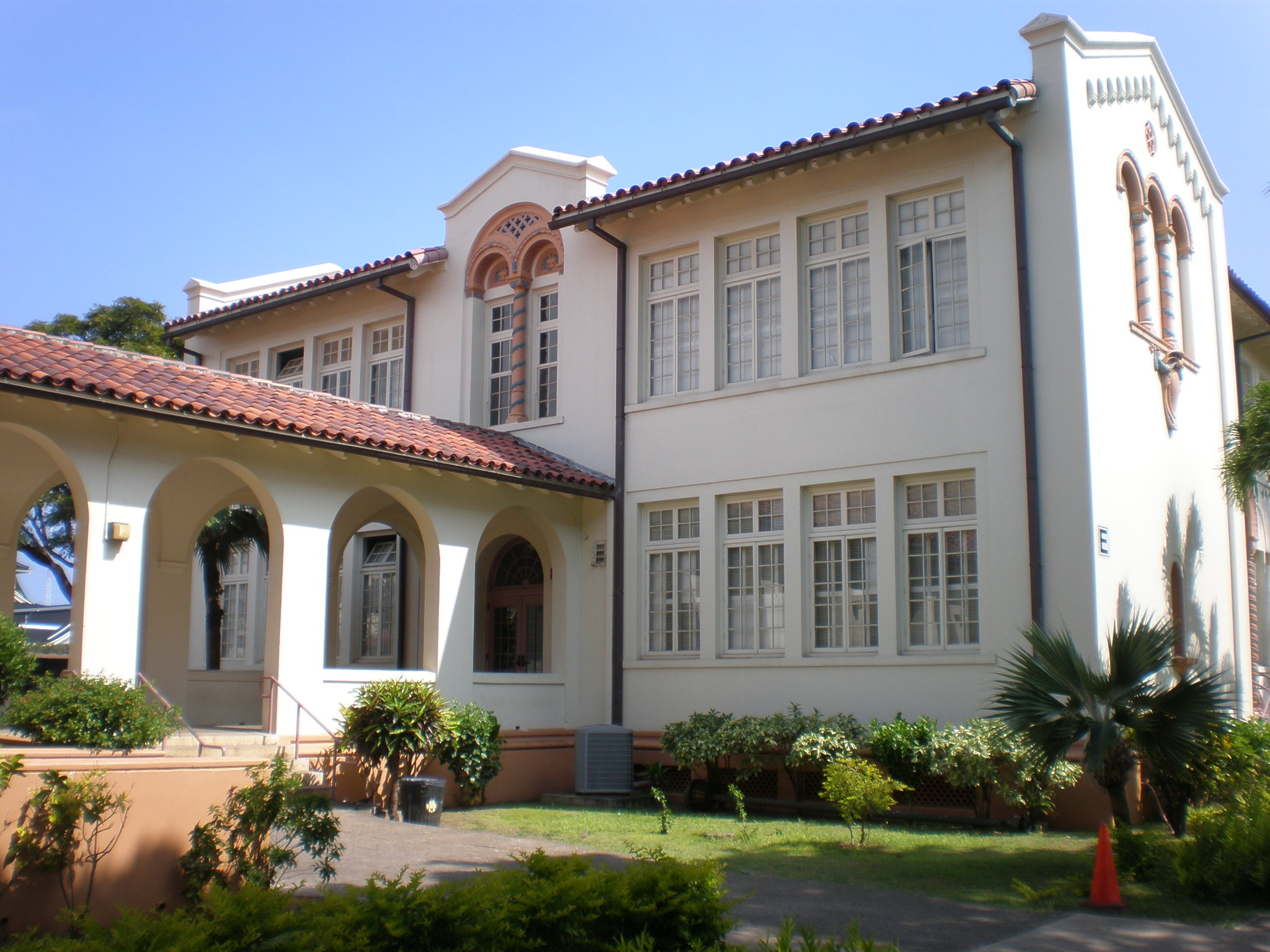
Walkway to Beckwith Hall (E)

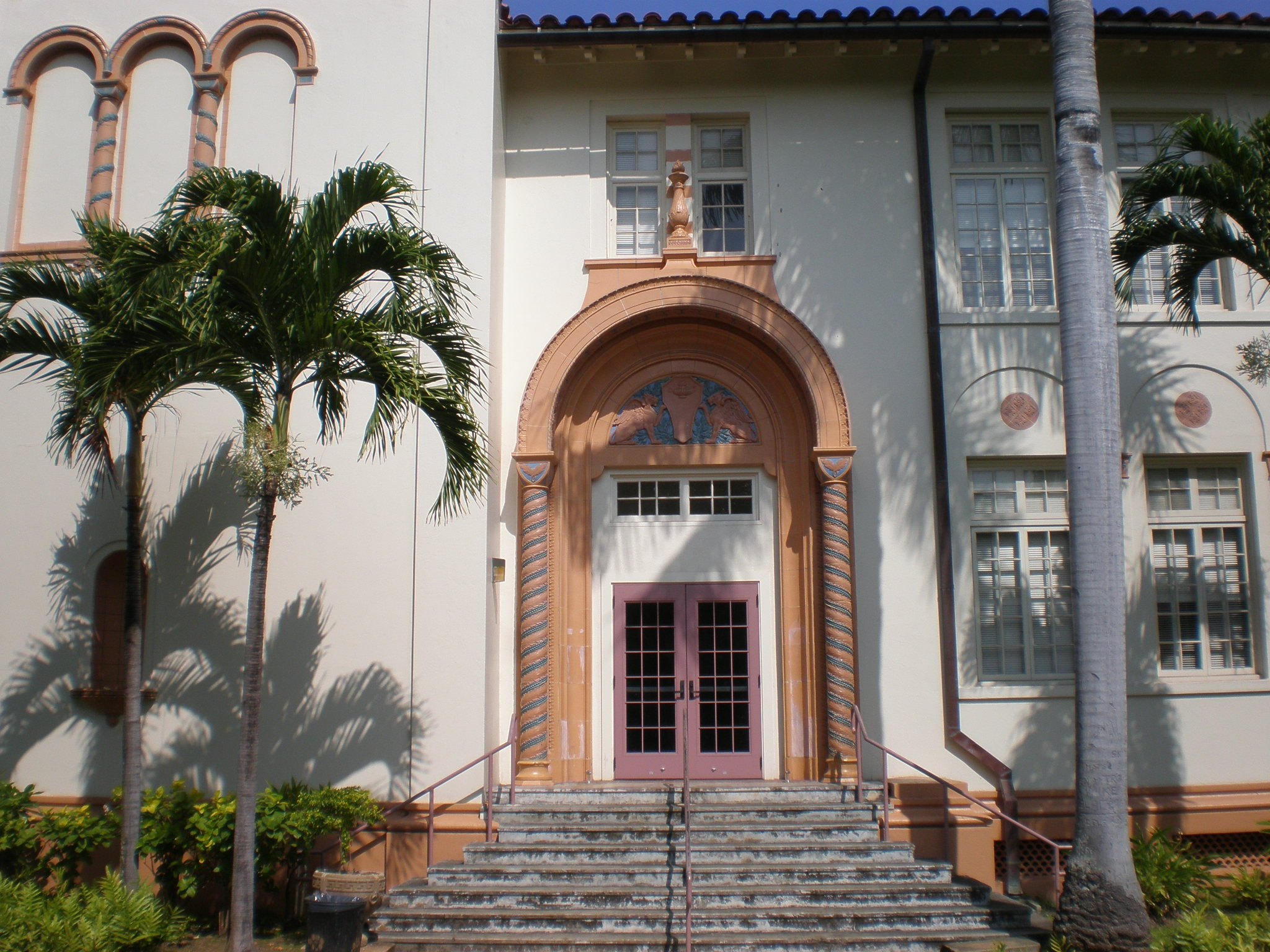
Miles E. Cary Circle doorway to Beckwith Hall (E)

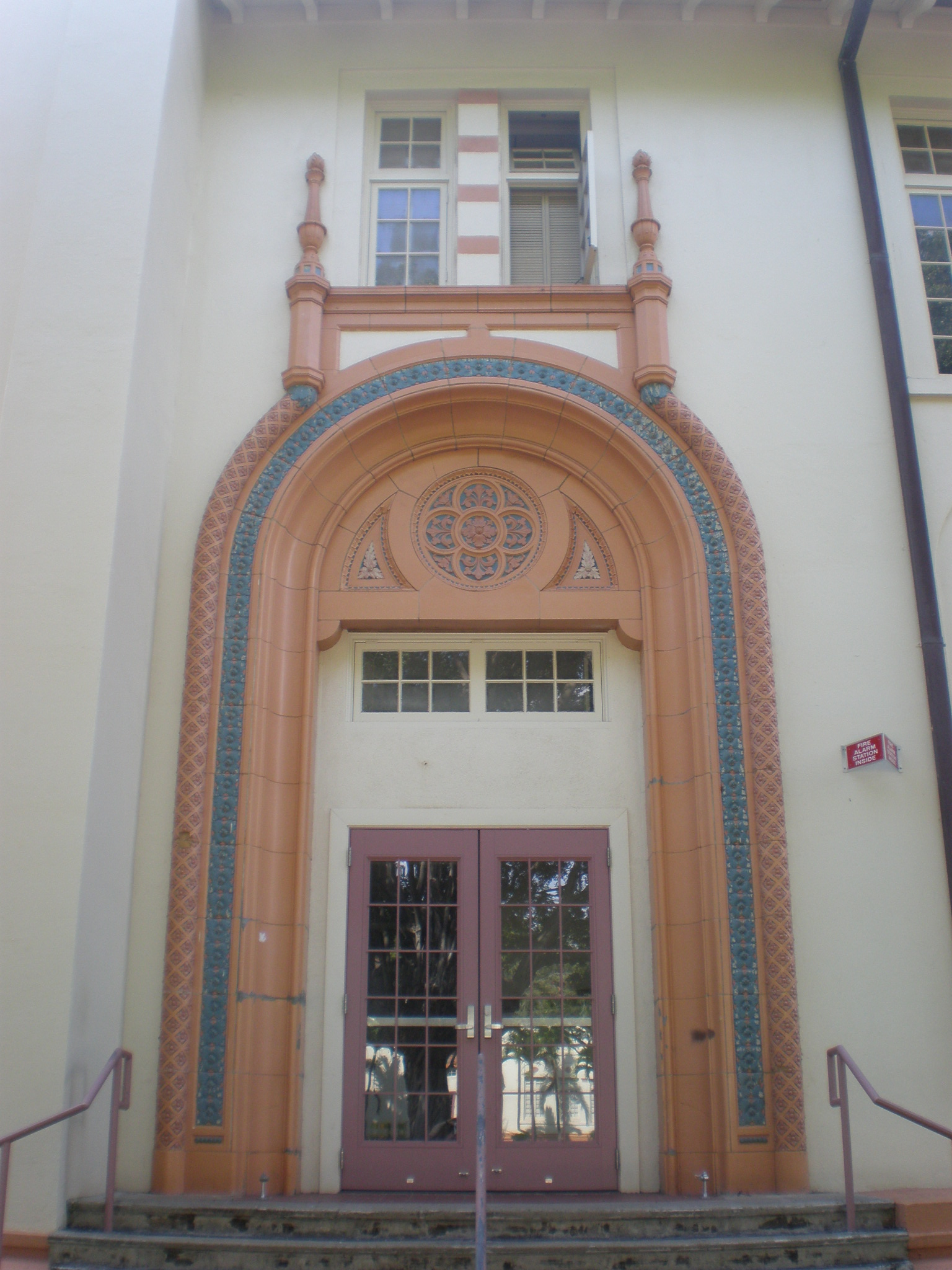
Miles E. Cary Circle doorway to Commercial building (B)

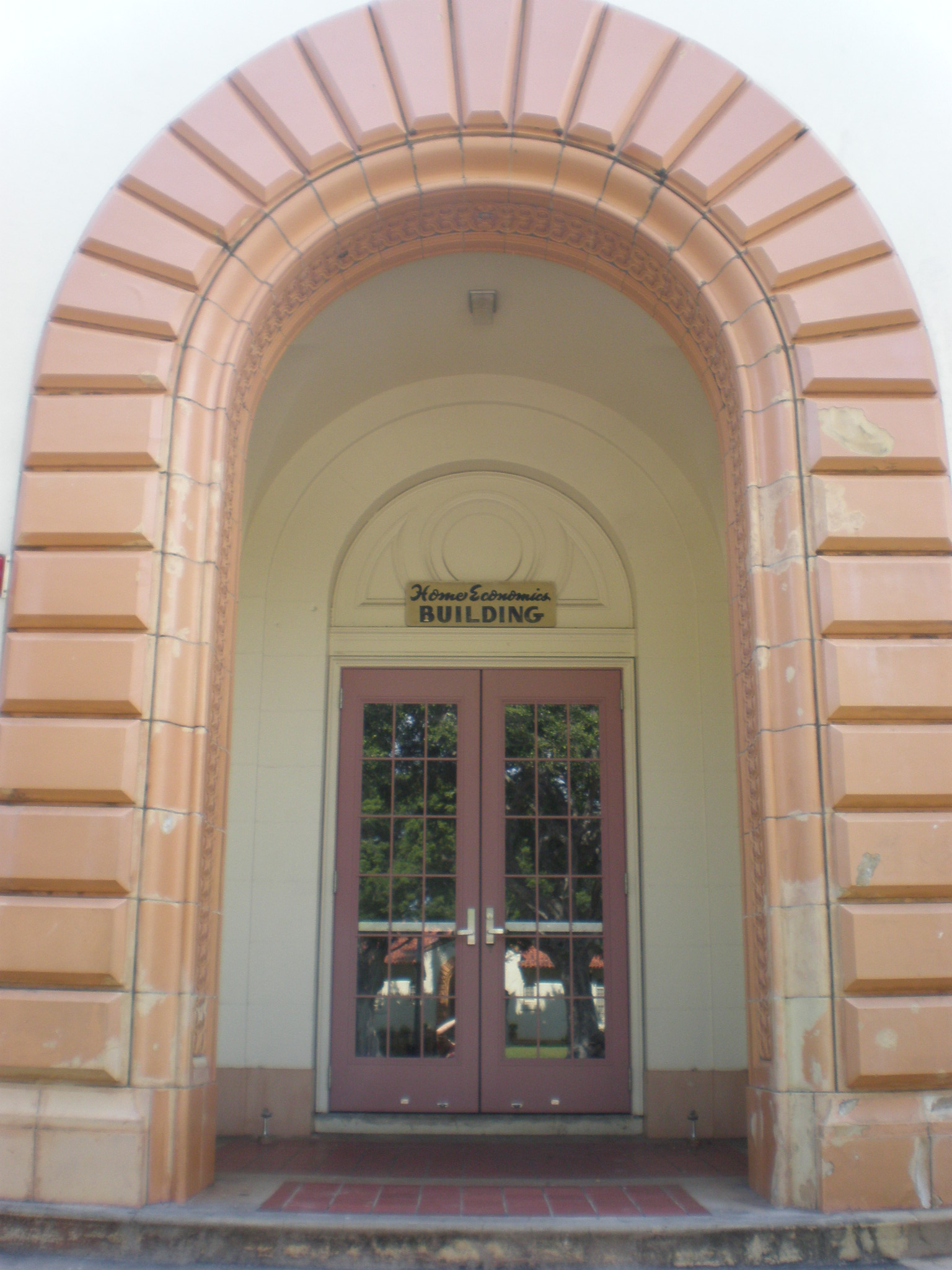
Doorway to Home Economics building (C)

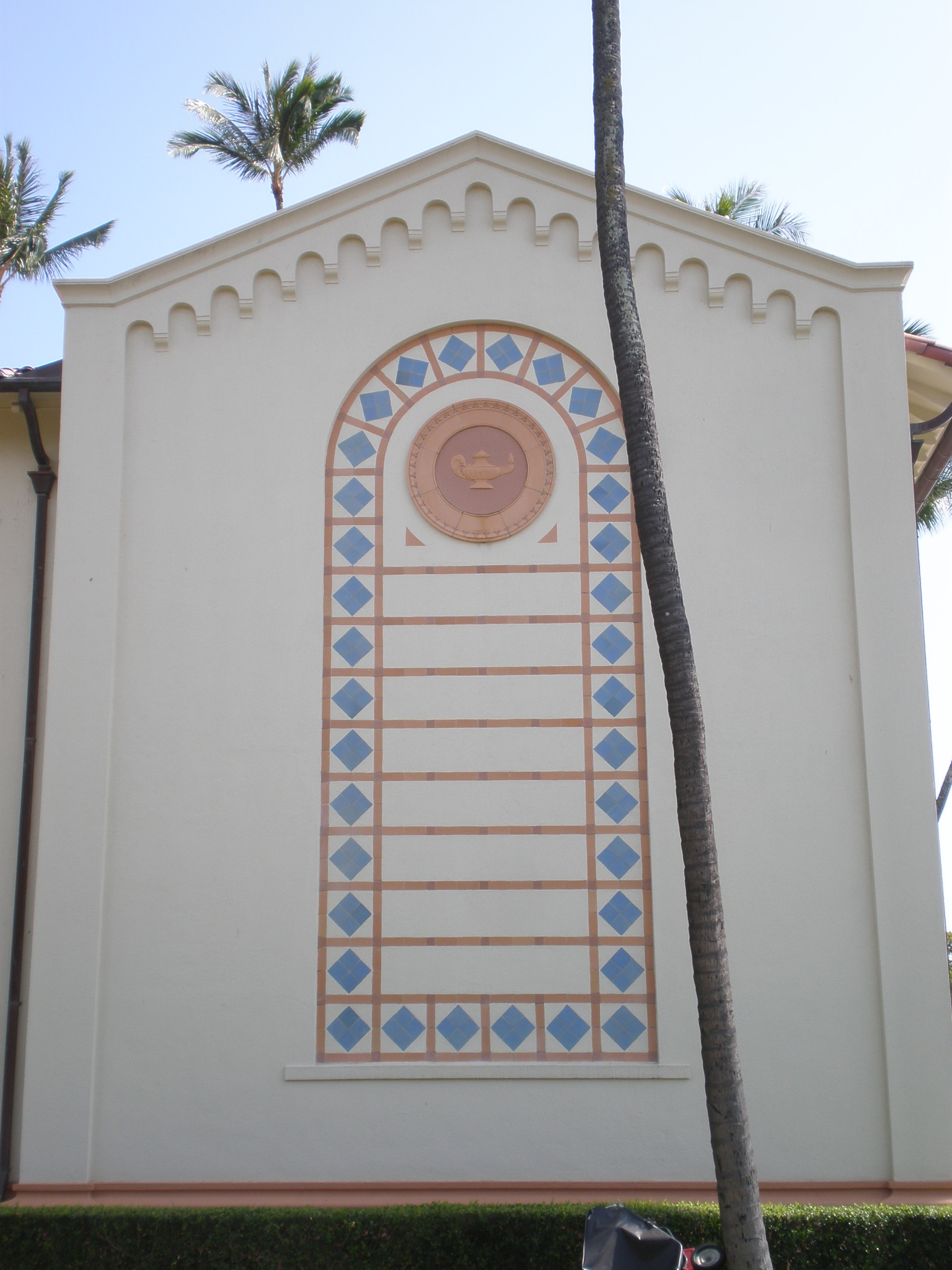
Main administration building end wing

== In popular culture ==
Several characters of the ninth part of JoJo's Bizarre Adventure, The JoJoLands attend the school, including the main protagonist, Jodio Joestar.
