= Maʻiki Aiu Lake =

Hula teacher and composer (1925 – 1984)

Margaret Ma'iki Souza Aiu Lake
- Born: 28 May 1925; Honolulu, Hawaii
- Died: 19 June 1984 (aged 59)
- Resting place: Diamond Head Memorial Park, Honolulu, Hawaii U.S.
- Occupations: Professional Hula Dancer, Hula Instructor, Song Composer, Master Kumu Hula, mother of seven (7)
- Spouse(s): Boniface Stephen Kaweokaohelani Aiu (m. 1947), Haywood Kahauanu Lake

Margaret Ma'iki Souza Aiu Lake (28 May 1925 – 19 June 1984) was a hula dancer, master kumu hula, composer, and influential figure in the second Hawaiian Renaissance. She was recognized as "Mother of the Hawaiian Renaissance" because of her revolutionary teaching and methodology. Many of her students became noted teachers themselves, making her the "most important hula teacher of the 20th century." In 2005, Honolulu Magazine named her one of the 100 most influential people of Hawai'i.

She, along with her Uncle Claude Malani, composed her beloved "Aloha Kaua'i" - a mele for the gracious people of the Garden Isle, who welcomed her when she performed weekends at nightclubs there during her youth. She did not, at the time, know of any family or friends living on the island. Also, she describes her love for Kaua'i's natural beauty and the fragrant mokihana berries woven into lei with maile lau li'i (fragrant small leaf maile).

== Early life ==
Margaret Ma’iki Souza was born in Honolulu, Hawai'i on May 28, 1925. Though her parents were Peter Charles Souza and Cecilia Pai’ohe Gilman Souza, she was first adopted and living with her great-aunt, Cecilia Rose Mahoe, and husband John William Kealoha in the Palolo Valley. As hānai, (Hawaiian term for informal adoption) Ma’iki considered them to be her grandparents. After the death of her adoptive family, she briefly returned to live with her biological mother, Cecilia Pai’ohe (who she is now buried with). Shortly after, she went to go live with her other great-aunt, Helen Pamaieulu Ha’o Correa who sparked her inspiration in hula.

Ma’iki started to learn the hula dance between the ages of 14 and 15. Though her great-aunt Helen was her original mentor in hula, she would later go on to professionally study under Lōkālia Montgomery and officially graduate as an ʻōlapa (dancer) in 1964 at the age of 18. Lōkālia Montgomery was known as a “master of ancient hula.” Lōkālia had a very traditional way of teaching hula. Her teaching style was described as stern yet breathtaking.

While continuing to study hula, she simultaneously worked as a professional contemporary/modern hula dancer at the Club Pago Pago and La Hula Rhumba in Waikiki for the next 8 years. Ma'iki would continue to seek mentorship from masters of hula and cultural research while working, such as Hawaiian scholar and Kumu Hula Mary Kawena Puku'i, noted ancient hula dancer 'Iolani Luahine, Vicki 'Ii Rodrigues, Bina Mossman and Kumu Hula Pua Ha'aheo regarding male hula styles. Ma'iki is noted for bringing back men dancers in hula, as they were in ancient times, the forefront performers in festivals and religious rituals. For Ma’iki, learning hula was not only about the choreography, but the culture, rich history, and deep meaning of it as well. So as a Christian it was difficult for Ma’iki to comfortably study the art of hula and its goddess, Laka, but with the help of her tutu (grandmother), she overcame the conflict.

== Career ==
Though Lake was studying to become a nurse through heavy influence from friends and family she was convinced to pursue her dream to become a Kumu Hula (dance master). She first started her career as a hula teacher by teaching to the Hawaiian Society at Blessed Sacrament Church where they occasionally put on performances. Teaching at the church did not satisfy Ma’iki so she opened a dance studio of her own called Margaret Aiu's Hula Studio. After gaining approval from her teachers, in 1952 she changed the name of the studio to Hālau Hula O Ma’iki. Lake's school was the first of the 20th century to be able to be claimed as a hālau. On the islands, there is a very big distinction between a normal hula studio that can be found on any part of the mainland and a Hālau Hula. Normal hula studios teach the traditional Polynesian dance forms like hula, Tahitian, Maori, or Samoan dance. Students at a hula studio are taught by staff members, not the actual Kumu Hula (master). Sometimes if there are advanced enough students, they can be taught by the Kumu Hula in a separate class. In a Hālau Hula though, it is organized so information from the Kumu Hula is directly given to the students. Students of the Hālau Hula are expected to pass down this information that they are given from a specific lineage of Kumu Hula to the next generation.

In 1972, Ma’iki advertised for a public Kumu Hula class. This was the first time that a class like that had been offered publicly. Many people were critical of Lake's decision at first until it became noticeable that a substantial number of students interested were extremely skilled and devoted to hula. Some of the students who graduated from Ma’iki Aiu Lake's Hālau ended up becoming some of the most well-known hula teachers/performers. Some of her students included Mapuana De Silva, Leina'ala Kalama Heine, and Robert Cazimero (one of the first men who participated in the reintroduction of male hula dancers in the Merrie Monarch Festival in the 1970s) of The Brothers Cazimero.

At the time traditional hula was becoming a dying practice but because of Lake's modern teaching style, there was a new generation infatuated with it and a huge demand from the tourist industry. As part of her revolutionary movement in the Hawaiian Renaissance, Lake would accept any students who were interested in learning the hula no matter their background or gender so they could “experience the art of Hawaiian dance, expressing all that we see, hear, smell touch taste and feel.” Because of this, it sparked questions during the Hawaiian Renaissance as to why men were not present in hula before. She was able to reconcile the traditional and modern aspects of hula. Whilst doing this she was able to bring back the love and appreciation for the dance in younger generations.

Ma’iki Aiu Lake taught people of all ages and skill levels, from young to old or beginner to advanced. At Hālau Hula O Ma’iki, her students learned not only the dance but the traditional genealogies, mannerisms, legends, poetry, and culture of Hawai'i. As part of Lake's new techniques, she created new pedagogical systems for her students. One new technique she utilized was requiring her students to keep notebooks filled with the chants and dances they learned to help with memorization. To keep the ancient traditions of hula alive, Lake would teach them how to responsibly gather materials to make their own leis, mats, and costumes. Lake would train her students in a variety of dances like kahiko (dance traditionally performed as a ceremony with chants and percussion instruments) and ‘auana (a less formal form of hula, where a ceremony is not needed). Though Ma’iki could be a strict teacher like Lōkālia according to her students, she was also seen as a mother figure to them.

Some of the several venues(1) and civic events(2) Halau Hula 'O Ma'iki performed at and participated in include:

1) - 'IOLANI PALACE and QUEEN EMMA SUMMER PALACE in Honolulu; The Queen Kapi'olani, The Princess Ka'iulani, The Royal Hawaiian, The Halekulani, The Moana/Surfrider, The Kaimana Beach hotels and King's Alley - all located in Waikiki. For several years, Ma’iki was the welcoming Host/MC at Paradise Parks' lu'au show in Manoa Valley, along with selected students performing from her school. In the mid-1970s Halau Hawai'i, built in Waikiki, was the culmination of Ma'iki's dream to have a multi-purpose Hawaiian cultural center - consisting of a resource museum and library (similar to the Bishop Museum), a music room and several class/dance rooms for teaching hula, as it was Halau Hula 'O Ma'iki's new home. During the evening, in a large theater space of the center, a showcase/tableau of Hawai'i's Native Hawaiian history was performed in chant, dance and music - from the ancient/pre Western contact period through modern times.

2) - The King Kamehameha Day Celebration Floral Parade, The Aloha Week Festivals and Parade, "May Day (is Lei Day)" concert at the Waikiki Shell, The Hula Bowl at Honolulu Stadium, "Kanikapila" at UH Manoa's Andrews Amphitheater, Ali'i Sunday at Kawaiha'o Church, Ali'i Birthday Remembrance at Mauna 'Ala in Nu'uanu and Prince Kuhio Festival on Kaua'i.

Also, she would present her entire haumana (students), including the "Gracious Ladies", in a halau concert every four years, beginning at McKinley High School Auditorium and later at the Neal S. Blaisdell Concert Hall in Honolulu. One year, Ma'iki presented the concert at the Sheraton Waikiki Hotel, where she publicly announced the formation of Kawena Corporation (the parent company of Halau Hula 'O Ma'iki and 'Ahahui Ka'iulani).

== Family and legacy ==
Ma’iki was married to Honolulu Fire Chief Boniface K. Aiu on February 21, 1947. The couple raised seven children together, with the two eldest from her previous marriage. Ma’iki divorced and remarried to her final husband, a Hawaiian entertainer named Haywood Kahauanu Lake. He was lead singer and songwriter of the Kahauanu Lake Trio, which Ma’iki and her many students of Halau Hula 'O Ma'iki often performed with over several decades. Their collaboration of Lake's popular contemporary music and Ma'iki's signature graceful/flowing style of hula ku'i and hula 'auana (modern hula) became well-known to kama'aina (local resident) and tourist audiences alike. Two of her known daughters, Karen Ka'ohulani Aiu, a Kumu Hula of her mother's first graduating class in Hula Kahiko (ancient hula) - 'Uniki Papa Lehua, and Coline Kaualoku Aiu Ferranti, a former Miss Hawai'i, are also talented/skilled/knowledgeable in the "Art of Hawaiian Dance". Coline teaches in Honolulu as Kumu Hula for Halau Hula 'O Ma'iki and published the book, "Hula Is Life" - the story of Halau Hula 'O Ma'iki. Karen, Kumu Hula of Halau Hawai'i, continues Ma'iki's legacy by teaching and performing her hula troupe in Waikiki, as well as at several cities in Japan. Currently, she is writing her memoir. Ma'iki's only granddaughter, Faith 'Eomaikalani Aiu, is a special education teacher in Hawaiian studies/culture and also is a Kumu Hula in Honolulu.
