= Keōua Hale =

Mansion in Honolulu, Hawaii

Coordinates: 21°18.646′N 157°51.424′W

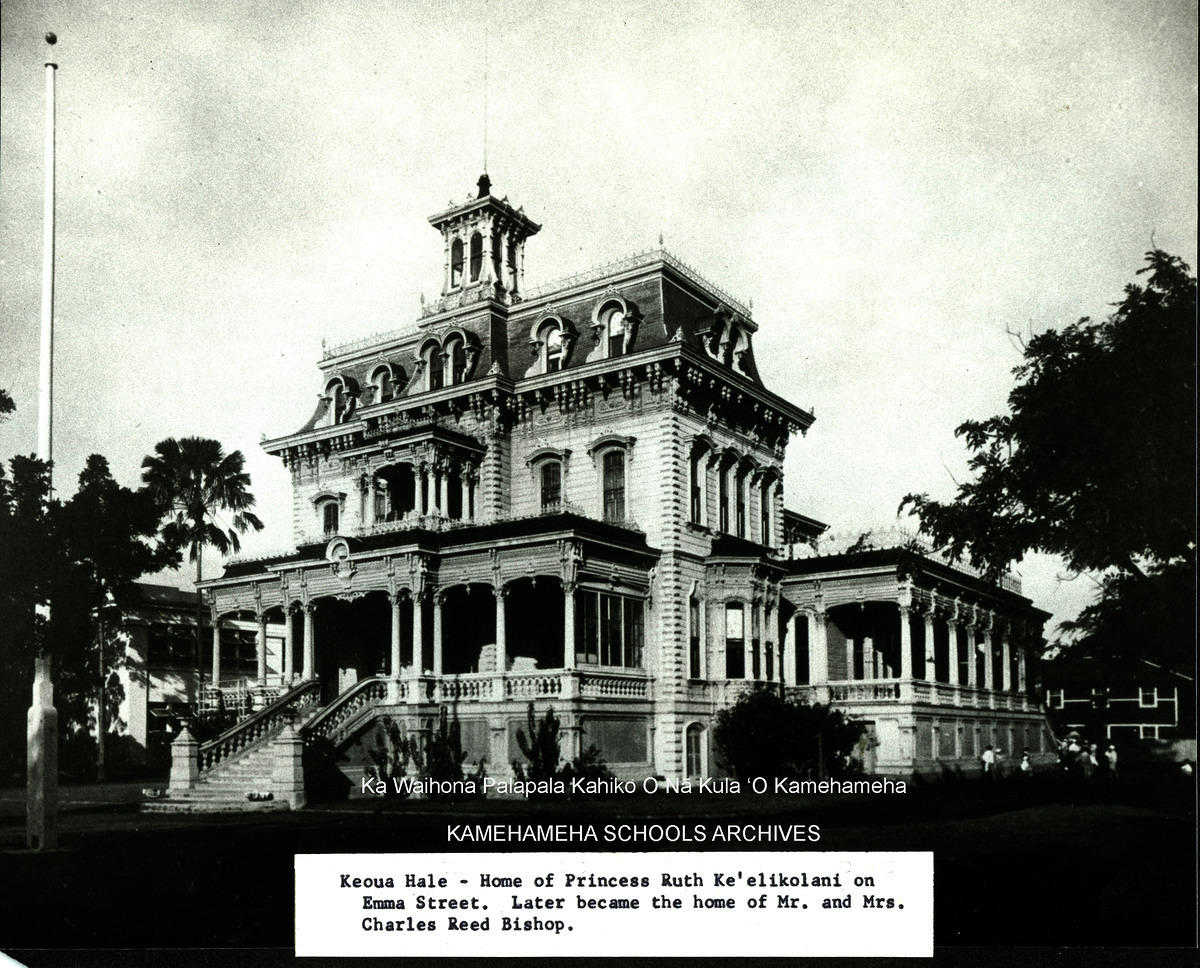
Keōua Hale

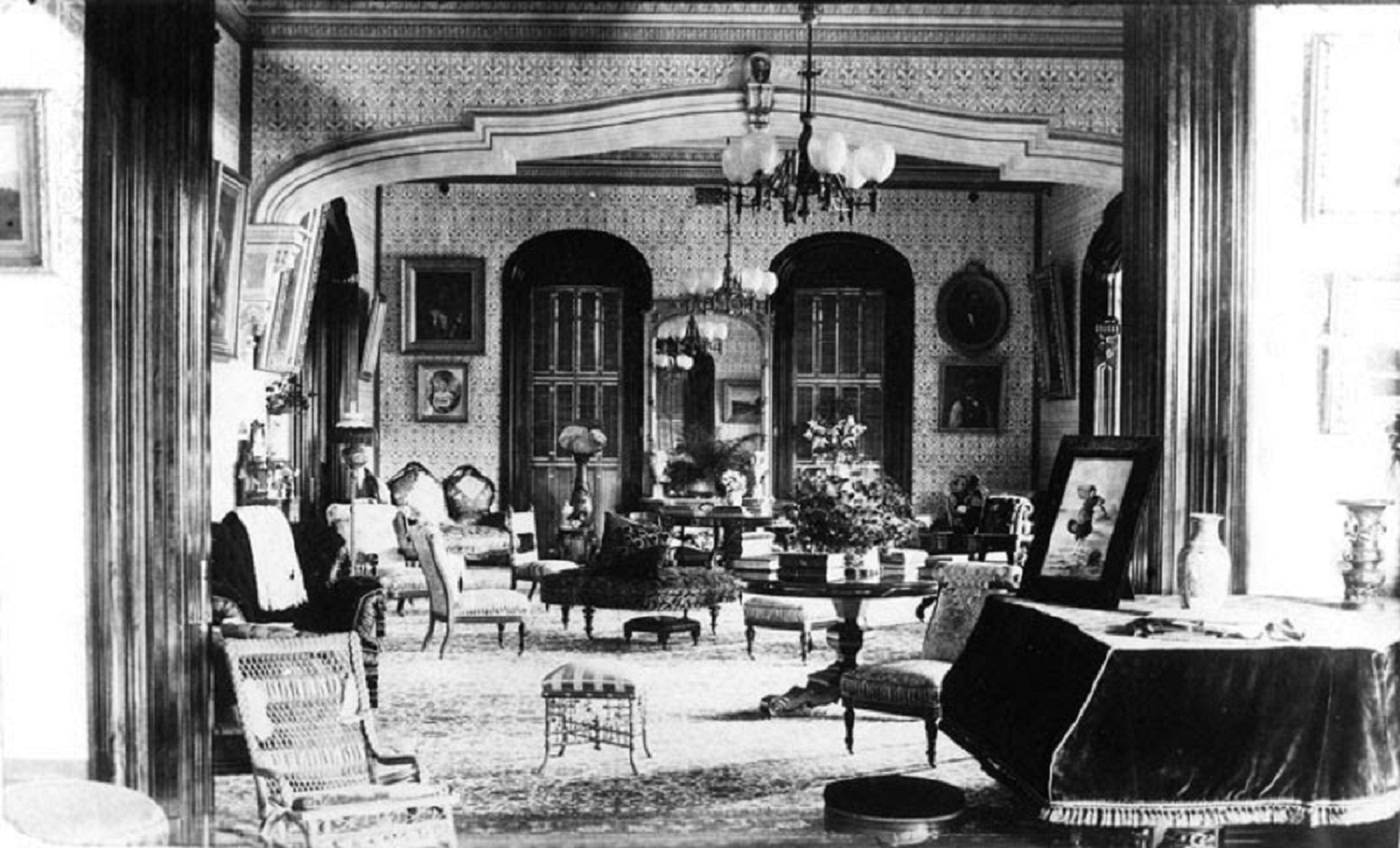
Drawing room of Keōua Hale

Keōua Hale was the mansion of Princess Ruth Keʻelikōlani at 1302 Queen Emma Street in downtown Honolulu, Hawaii.

== History ==
The mansion was built upon the site of Ruth and her adoptive son Leleiohoku's residence in Honolulu, Kaʻakopua. It burned down in 1873 and plans were made to build a grander home on the location. In the meantime Keʻelikōlani and Leleiohoku resided in another house on King Street until the house was completed, although most of her time was spent on the Big Island of Hawaii at the Hulihee Palace. Leleiohoku never saw the building completed, dying in 1877.

The main architect behind new structure was Charles J. Hardy, an American from Chicago, employed at the Enterprise Planing Mill in Honolulu. The gaslit interior of the mansion was celebrated for its ornate plaster work and frescoes. It followed the Second Empire architecture, or so-called French style of architecture, and was considered a classical Victorian-style mansion. Surrounded by extensive, well-kept gardens, it was characterized by mansard roof, broad lanais, from which lofty flights of steps led down into the gardens, and a large drawing-room upon the ceiling of which was emblazoned the Hawaiian coat of arms.

In the spring of 1883 the building was completed. It was larger than the ʻIolani Palace. Ruth gave a grand luau to celebrate the event. This was followed by a ball in the evening, which was attended by all the best society of Honolulu, whether of native or foreign birth. But after these festivities the princess was taken suddenly ill, and left for Kailua on Hawaiʻi island hoping to restore her health. She received medical attention, but did not recover. On 24 May her remains were brought back to Honolulu, and lay in state in the new house. It was later inherited by Princess Bernice Pauahi who died in it.

Today, the site of Keōua Hale is occupied by Princess Ruth Keʻelikōlani Middle School.

== See also ==
- List of Hawaiian royal residences
