= Princess Ruth Keʻelikōlani Middle School =

Location
- 1302 Queen Emma Street; Honolulu, HI 96813

Information
- Other name: Ke‘elikōlani Middle School
- Former names: Central Grammar School, Central Intermediate School, Central Middle School
- Established: 1928
- NCES District ID: 1500030
- NCES School ID: 150003000223
- Principal: Joseph Passantino
- Grades: 6-8
- Enrollment: 372 (2023-2024)
- Student to teacher ratio: 14.31
- Mascot: Bulldog
- Website: https://www.keelikolanimiddle.org/

- Princess Ruth Keʻelikōlani Middle School (as Central Intermediate School)
- U.S. National Register of Historic Places
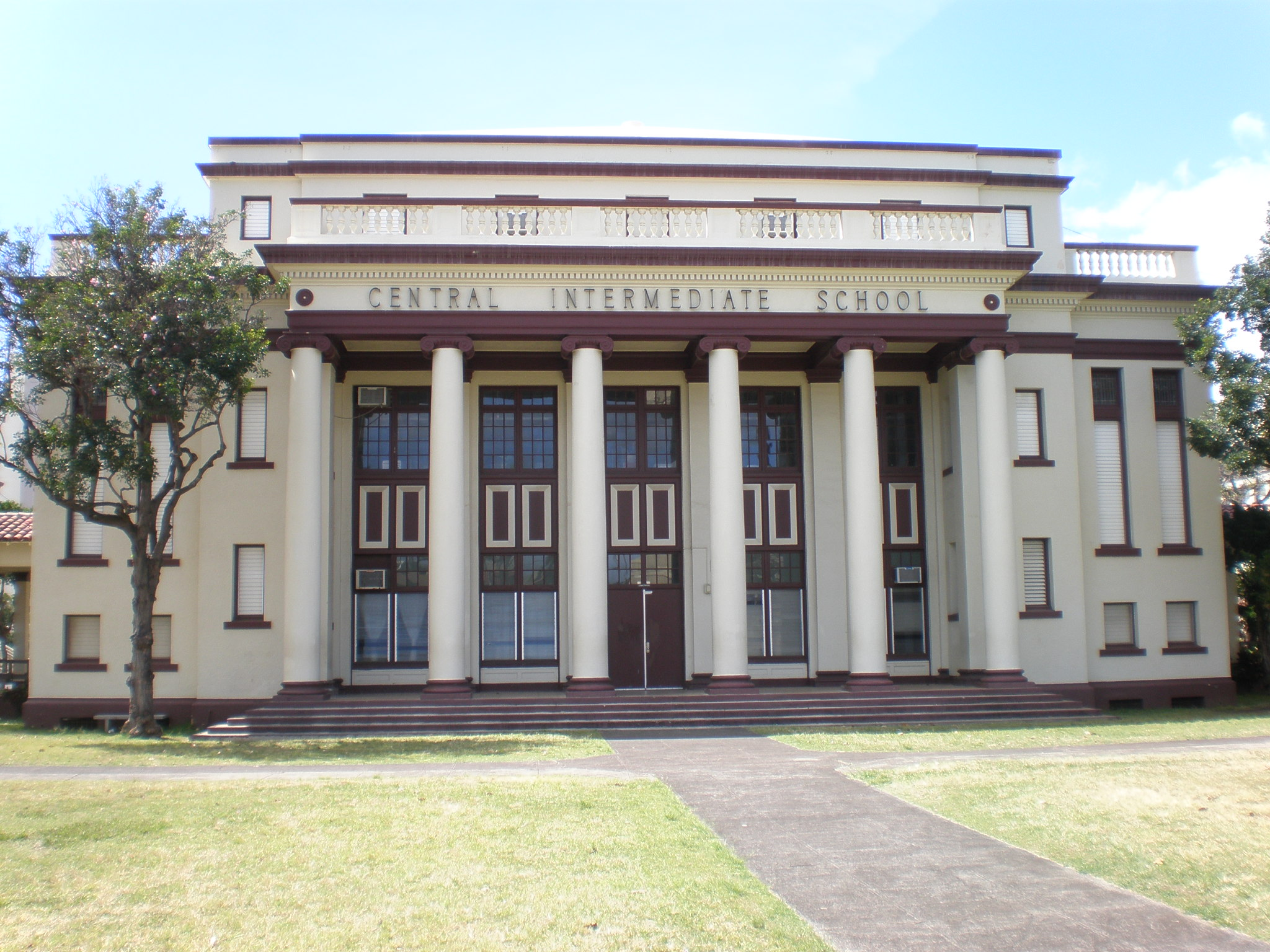

- Location within Hawaii
- Location: 1302 Queen Emma Street, Honolulu, Hawaii
- Coordinates: 21°18′41″N 157°51′24″W
- Area: 3 acres (1.2 ha)
- Built: 1925-27
- Architect: Walter L. Emory and Marshall H. Webb, Harry K. Stewart
- Architectural style: Neoclassical Revival
- NRHP reference No.: 03001049
- Added to NRHP: February 11, 2004

Princess Ruth Keʻelikōlani Middle School, shortened as Ke‘elikōlani Middle School (formerly known as Central Middle School, Central Intermediate School, Central Grammar School, and Ke‘elikōlani School) is a co-ed, middle school of the Hawaii Department of Education that occupies a historic building in Honolulu, Hawaiʻi, built on the grounds of Keōua Hale, the former palace of Princess Ruth Keʻelikōlani of Hawaiʻi.

== History ==
A large palace for Princess Ruth Keʻelikōlani, known as Keoua Hale was built on this site in 1878. After she died in 1883, her estate passed to her first cousin, Bernice Pauahi Bishop, who died in 1884. Later, the palace was sold to the government to be used for educational purposes. In 1895, Honolulu High School (formerly Fort Street English Day School) classes were held there until 1907, when the school was renamed McKinley High School and relocated to a new building facing Thomas Square. (That building later housed the Linekona School and is now the Honolulu Museum of Art School). Central Grammar School then took McKinley's old place in Keʻelikōlani's former palace.

In 1920, Central Grammar School was designated a forerunner of what would become the "English Standard" type of public school. Soon thereafter, English-language exams were required for entrance. Plans for a new building were commissioned to accommodate the rapid growth of students going on to secondary schools during the booming 1920s. The palace was demolished, and the makai wing of the new building opened in 1925. The school was originally named Keʻelikōlani School, but was renamed Central Grammar School in 1927 after it became too difficult for others to pronounce (One can still see the name "Keelikolani School" engraved over the first-story windows on that side.) After the other two wings were completed in 1927, Central Grammar School became Central Junior High School, one of only six public secondary schools in Honolulu at the time. In 1932, all junior high schools were renamed intermediate schools.

=== 2021 name change ===
In 2021, Central Middle School was renamed to Princess Ruth Keʻelikōlani Middle School in honor of Keʻelikōlani. The effort to change the name began in 2019, and the change was approved by the Board of Education in September 2021. The renaming celebration took place on February 9, 2022.

== Academics ==
As of the 2024-2025 school year, students are required to take core classes for each grade in English, mathematics, social studies, and science. For English, the Wonders Reading workshop is used for grade six, while the Amplify curriculum is used for grades seven and eight. Mathematics courses use the i-Ready software for implementation.

The school also requires advisory and Social Emotional Learning (SEL) classes. For electives, the school offers a variety of courses, including band, orchestra, and physical education.

== Architecture ==
The original design of the school was drawn up in 1922 by the prominent architectural firm of Walter Emory and Marshall Webb, who also designed such notable buildings as the grand Tudor Revival residence of Charles M. Cooke Jr. (1912), the eclectic Indian-Western-style Honpa Hongwanji Hawaii Betsuin Buddhist Temple (1918), and the Neoclassical Revival and Art Deco Hawaii Theatre (1921). Their first design showed more influences of the Mediterranean Revival style that characterized many public buildings of that era, but they modified the plans in 1924 to add more Neoclassical Revival features, such as Ionic and Corinthian columns. This style was further enhanced by the Territorial building inspector at the time, Harry K. Stewart, a graduate of Central Grammar School who went on to design many other public buildings in the Territory, such as Baldwin High School and Molokai Public Library.

== Enrollment and demographics ==
As of the 2023-2024 school year, the school has a total of 372 students. Of this, 210 students are Native Hawaiian or Pacific Islander, 83 students are Asian, 30 students are Hispanic, 5 students are White, and 41 students identify as two or more races. Approximately 65% of students are eligible for free lunch, and 10.6% are eligible for reduced-price lunch.

== Notable achievements ==
In May 2024, principal Joe Passantino was named the Hawaii State Principal of the Year by the Hawaii Association of Secondary School Administrators, a national affiliate of the National Association of Secondary School Principals. Passantino was credited for doubling math scores and increasing English preparedness by 50%.
