= Irie =

Irie is a feminine given name, the diminutive or pet form of Iris.

- Irie (surname)
- D-Irie, German rapper (b. 1981)
- Elysée Irié Bi Séhi, Ivorian soccer player (b. 1989)
- Irie Love, American reggae singer (b. 1985)

Irie may also refer to:

- Irie, a word in Jamaican Patois and Rastafarian English (see Iyaric)
- Irie Maffia, Hungarian band formed in 2005
- Irie Révoltés, German music band from Heidelberg, formed in 2000
- Irie Time, American reggae band formed in the early 1990s
- Muroran Irie Stadium, athletic stadium in Japan
