= Guitar tunings =

Adjusting pitches of guitar strings

The range of a guitar with standard tuning

Standard tuning (listen)

Guitar tunings are the assignment of pitches to the open strings of guitars, including classical guitars, acoustic guitars, and electric guitars. Tunings are described by the particular pitches that are made by notes in Western music. By convention, the notes are ordered and arranged from the lowest-pitched string (i.e., the deepest bass-sounding note) to the highest-pitched string (i.e., the highest sounding note), or the thickest string to thinnest, or the lowest frequency to the highest. This sometimes confuses beginner guitarists, since the highest-pitched string is referred to as the 1st string, and the lowest-pitched is the 6th string.

Standard tuning defines the string pitches as E (82.41 Hz), A (110 Hz), D (146.83 Hz), G (196 Hz), B (246.94 Hz), and E (329.63 Hz), from the lowest pitch (low E_{2}) to the highest pitch (high E_{4}). Standard tuning is used by most guitarists, and frequently used tunings can be understood as variations on standard tuning. To aid in memorising these notes, mnemonics are used, for example, Eddie Ate Dynamite Good Bye Eddie.

The term guitar tunings may refer to pitch sets other than standard tuning, also called nonstandard, alternative, or alternate. There are hundreds of these tunings, often with small variants of established tunings. Communities of guitarists who share a common musical tradition often use the same or similar tuning styles.

== Standard and alternatives ==
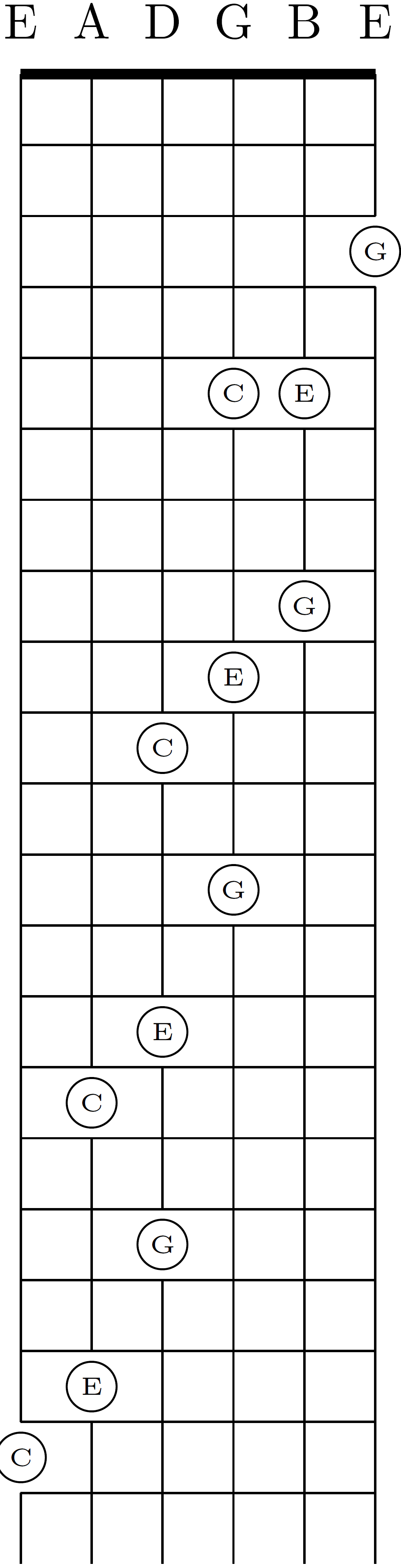
In standard tuning, the C-major chord has multiple shapes because of the irregular major-third between the G- and B-strings. Three such shapes are shown above.

=== Standard ===
Standard tuning is the tuning most frequently used on a six-string guitar and musicians assume this tuning by default if a specific alternate (or scordatura) is not mentioned. In scientific pitch notation, the guitar's standard tuning consists of the following notes: E_{2}–A_{2}–D_{3}–G_{3}–B_{3}–E_{4} .

String frequencies of standard tuning
String	Frequency	Scientific pitch notation
1 (E)	329.63 Hz	E_{4}
2 (B)	246.94 Hz	B_{3}
3 (G)	196.00 Hz	G_{3}
4 (D)	146.83 Hz	D_{3}
5 (A)	110.00 Hz	A_{2}
6 (E)	82.41 Hz	E_{2}

The guitar is a transposing instrument; that is, music for guitars is notated one octave higher than the true pitch. This is to reduce the need for ledger lines in music written for the instrument, and thus simplify the reading of notes when playing the guitar.

Standard tuning provides reasonably simple fingering (fret-hand movement) for playing standard scales and basic chords in all major and minor keys. Separation of the second (B) through fifth (A) strings being tuned in minor 3rds and second (e) following the low (E) string as the separation being tuned in 5ths, and creating as by a five-semitone interval (a perfect fourth) allows the guitarist to play a chromatic scale with each of the four fingers of the fretting hand controlling one of the first four frets (index finger on fret 1, little finger on fret 4, etc.) only when the hand is in the first position.

The open notes of the second (B) and third (G) strings are separated by four semitones (a major third). This tuning pattern of (low) fourths, one major third, and one fourth was inherited by the guitar from its predecessor instrument, the viol. The irregular major third breaks the fingering patterns of scales and chords, so that guitarists have to memorize multiple chord shapes for each chord. Scales and chords are simplified by major thirds tuning and all-fourths tuning, which are regular tunings maintaining the same musical interval between consecutive open string notes.

When barring each fret in standard tuning, all of the notes of the minor pentatonic scale based on the note of the first fret (along with its relative major pentatonic scale) are produced. For example, the open strings E, A, D, G, B, E yield the notes of the E minor pentatonic scale (G major pentatonic), and barring the third fret produces the notes of the G minor pentatonic scale (B♭ major pentatonic).

Chromatic note progression
	0	I	II	III	IV
String	open	1st fret (index)	2nd fret (middle)	3rd fret (ring)	4th fret (little)
6th	E_{2}	F_{2}	F^{♯}_{2} / G^{♭}_{2}	G_{2}	G^{♯}_{2} / A^{♭}_{2}
5th	A_{2}	A^{♯}_{2} / B^{♭}_{2}	B_{2}	C_{3}	C^{♯}_{3} / D^{♭}_{3}
4th	D_{3}	D^{♯}_{3} / E^{♭}_{3}	E_{3}	F_{3}	F^{♯}_{3} / G^{♭}_{3}
3rd	G_{3}	G^{♯}_{3} / A^{♭}_{3}	A_{3}	A^{♯}_{3} / B^{♭}_{3}	B_{3}
2nd	B_{3}	C_{4}	C^{♯}_{4} / D^{♭}_{4}	D_{4}	D^{♯}_{4} / E^{♭}_{4}
1st	E_{4}	F_{4}	F^{♯}_{4} / G^{♭}_{4}	G_{4}	G^{♯}_{4} / A^{♭}_{4}

=== Alternative ===
Alternative ("alternate") tuning refers to any open string note arrangement other than standard tuning. These offer different kinds of deep or ringing sounds, chord voicings, and fingerings on the guitar. Alternative tunings are common in folk music. Alternative tunings change the fingering of common chords when playing the guitar, and this can ease the playing of certain chords while simultaneously increase the difficulty of playing other chords.

Some tunings are used for particular songs and may be named after the song's title. There are hundreds of these tunings, although many are slight variations of other alternate tunings. Several alternative tunings are used regularly by communities of guitarists who share a common musical tradition, such as American folk or Celtic folk music.

The various alternative tunings have been grouped into the following categories:

- dropped
- open
- both major and minor (cross note)
- modal
- instrumental (based on other stringed instruments)
- miscellaneous ("special").

Joni Mitchell developed a shorthand to specify guitar tunings: one letter naming the note of the open lowest string, followed by the relative fret (half-step) offsets between adjacent strings; in this format, the standard tuning is E55545. This scheme highlights pitch relationships and simplifies comparisons among different tuning schemes.

==== String gauges ====
String gauge refers to the thickness and diameter of a guitar string, which influences the overall sound and pitch of the guitar depending on the guitar string used. Some alternative tunings are difficult or even impossible to achieve with conventional guitars due to the sets of guitar strings, which have gauges optimized for standard tuning. With conventional sets of guitar strings, some higher tunings increase the string-tension until playing the guitar requires significantly more finger-strength and stamina, or even until a string snaps or the guitar is warped. However, with lower tunings, the sets of guitar strings may be loose and buzz. The tone of the guitar strings is also negatively affected by using unsuitable string gauges on the guitar.

Generally, alternative tunings benefit from re-stringing of the guitar with string gauges purposefully chosen to optimize particular tunings by using lighter strings for higher-pitched notes (to lower the tension of the strings) and heavier strings for lower-pitched notes (to prevent string buzz and vibration).

== Dropped tunings ==
A dropped tuning is one of the categories of alternative tunings and the process starts with standard tuning and typically lowers the pitch of ("drops") one or more strings, almost always the lowest-pitched (E) string on the guitar.

The drop D tuning is common in electric guitar and heavy metal music. The low E string is tuned down one whole step (to D) and the rest of the strings remain in standard tuning. This creates an "open power chord" (three-note fifth) with the low three strings (DAD).

Although the drop D tuning was introduced and developed by blues and classical guitarists, it is well known from its usage in contemporary heavy metal and hard rock bands. Early rock songs tuned in drop D include the Beatles' "Dear Prudence" (1968) and Led Zeppelin's "Moby Dick" (1969). Tuning the lowest string one tone down, from E to D, allowed these musicians to lower the key of songs of their choosing and thus acquire a heavier and darker sound than in standard tuning, without needing to re-tune all six guitar strings; this, plus the fact that it expands the guitar's range by two semitones (D and D^{♯}), makes drop D a decidedly convenient tuning.

In the mid-1980s, three alternative rock bands, King's X, Soundgarden, and Melvins, influenced by Led Zeppelin and Black Sabbath, made extensive use of drop D tuning. While playing power chords (a chord that includes the prime, fifth, and octave) in standard tuning requires a player to use two or three fingers, drop D tuning needs just one, similar in technique to playing barre chords. This allowed them to use different methods of articulating power chords (legato for example) and more importantly, it allowed guitarists to change chords faster. This new technique of playing power chords introduced by these early grunge bands was a great influence on many artists, such as Rage Against the Machine and Tool. The same drop D tuning then became common practice among alternative metal acts such as the band Helmet, who used the tuning a great deal throughout their career and would later influence many alternative metal and nu metal bands.

There is also a double drop D tuning, in which both E strings are tuned down a whole step (to D). The rest of the strings keep their original pitch.

== Open tunings ==
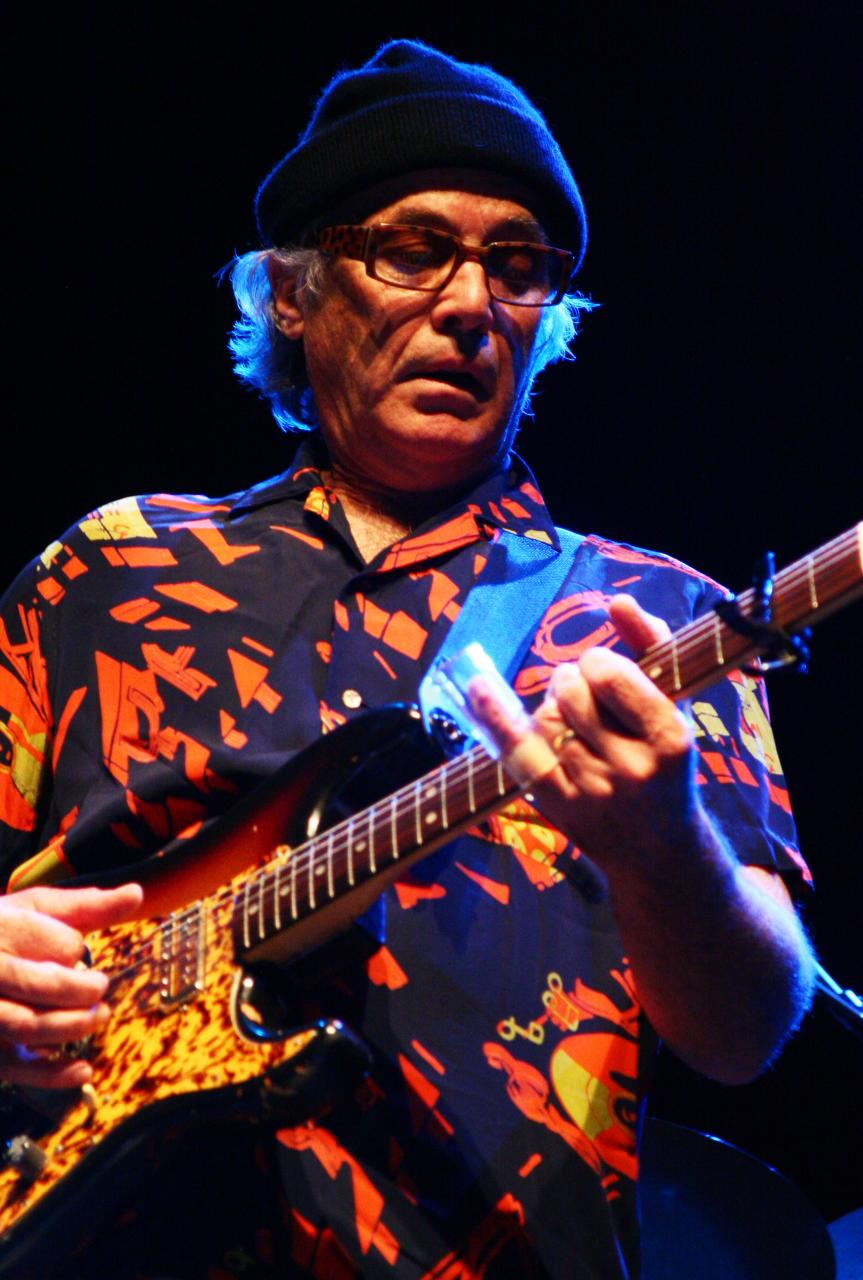
Ry Cooder plays slide guitar with open tunings

An open tuning allows the guitarist to play a chord by strumming the open strings (no strings fretted).

Open tunings may be chordal or modal. In chordal open tunings, the open chord consists of at least three different pitch classes. In a given key, these are the root note, its 3rd and its 5th, and may include all the strings or a subset. The tuning is named for the base chord when played open, typically a major chord, and all similar chords in the chromatic scale are played by barring all strings across a single fret. Open tunings are common in blues and folk music. These tunings are frequently used in the playing of slide and lap-slide ("Hawaiian") guitars, and Hawaiian slack key music. A musician who is well known for using open tuning in his music is Ry Cooder, who uses open tunings when playing the slide guitar.

Most modern music uses equal temperament because it facilitates the ability to play the guitar in any key—as compared to just intonation, which favors certain keys, and makes the other keys sound less in tune.

Repetitive open tunings are used for two classical non-Spanish guitars. For the English guitar, the open chord is C major (C–E–G–C–E–G); for the Russian guitar, which has seven strings, it is G major (D–G–B–D–G–B–D).

When the open strings constitute a minor chord, the open tuning may sometimes be called a cross-note tuning.

=== Major key tunings ===
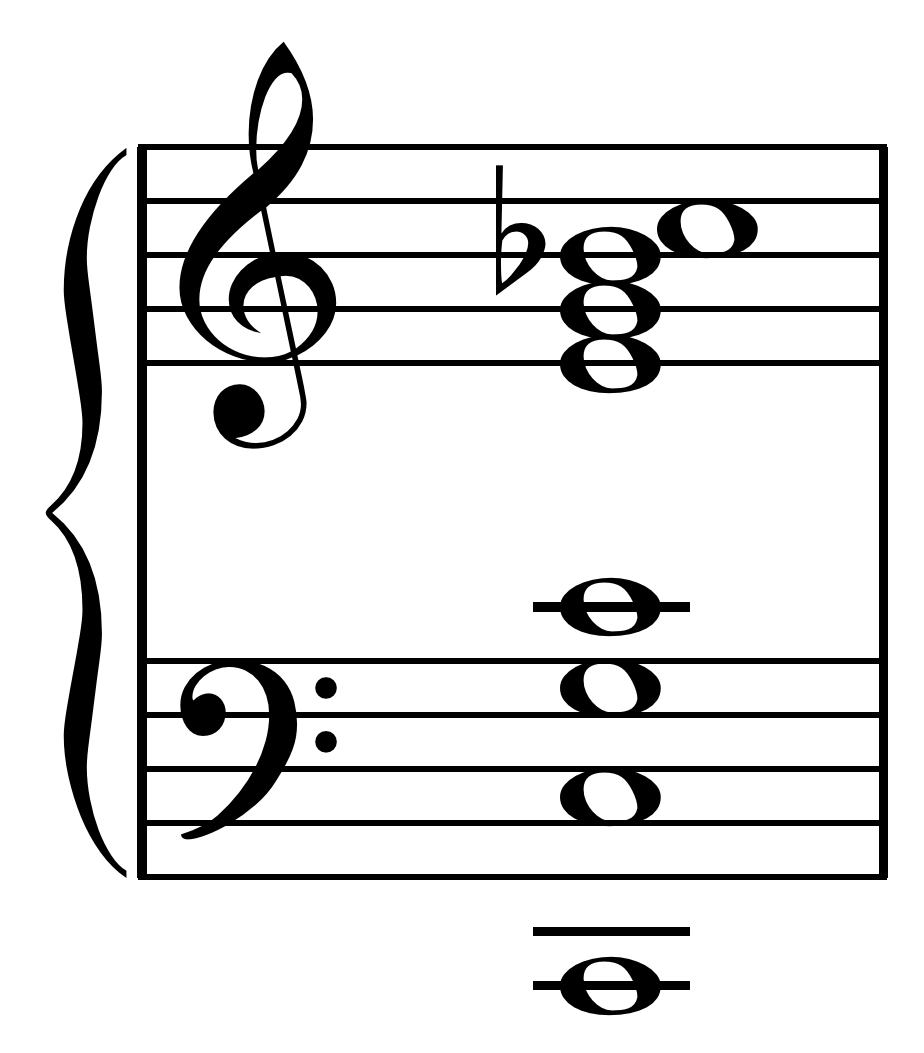
C's first 8 harmonics (C, C, G, C, E, G, B♭, C)

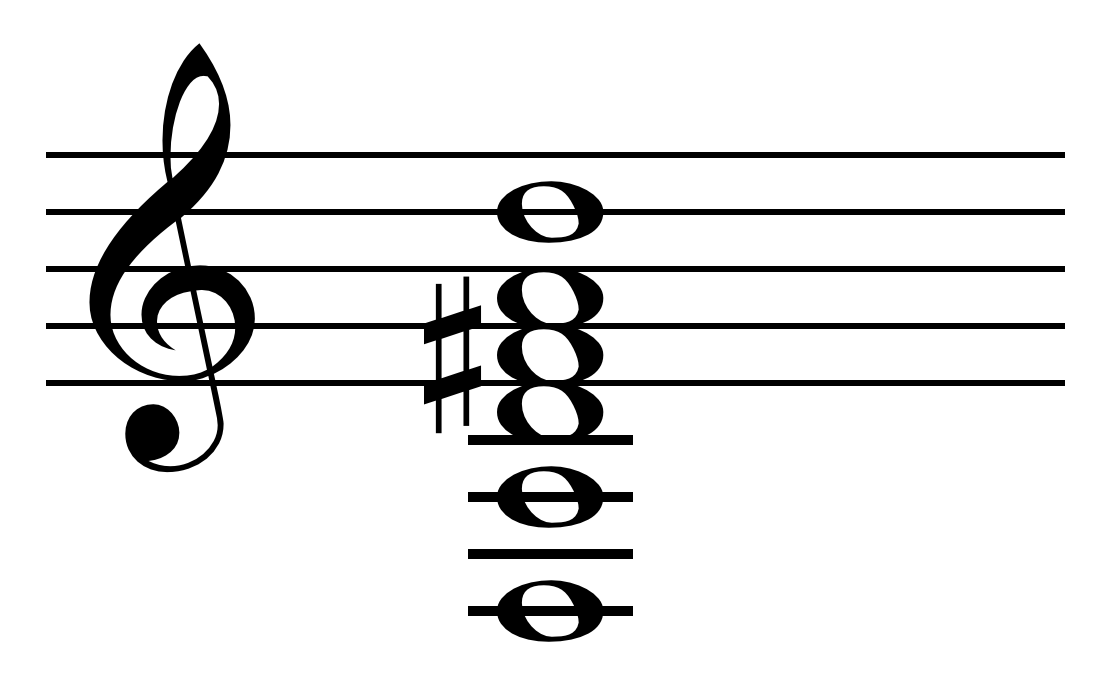
Open D tuning

Open D tuning (listen)

Open G tuning (listen)

Major open tunings give a major chord with the open strings.

Open tunings
	Major triad	Repetitive	Overtones	Other (often most popular)
Open A	(A,C^{♯},E)	A–C♯–E–A–C^{♯}–E	A–A–E–A–C^{♯}–E	E–A–C^{♯}–E–A–E
Open B	(B,D^{♯}, F♯)	B–D^{♯}–F^{♯}–B–D^{♯}–F^{♯}	B–B–F^{♯}–B–D^{♯}–F^{♯}	B–F^{♯}–B–F^{♯}–B–D^{♯}
Open C	(C,E,G)	C–E–G–C–E–G	C–C–G–C–E–G	C–G–C–G–C–E
Open D	(D,F^{♯},A)	D–F^{♯}–A–D–F^{♯}–A	D–D–A–D–F^{♯}–A	D–A–D–F^{♯}–A–D
Open E	(E,G^{♯},B)	E–G^{♯}–B–E–G^{♯}–B	E–E–B–E–G^{♯}–B	E–B–E–G^{♯}–B–E
Open F	(F,A,C)	F–A–C–F–A–C	F–F–C–F–A–C	C–F–C–F–A–F
Open G	(G,B,D)	G–B–D–G–B–D	G–G–D–G–B–D	D–G–D–G–B-D

Open tunings often tune the lowest open note to C, D, or E and they often tune the highest open note to D or E; tuning down the open string from E to D or C reduces the risk of breaking strings, which is associated with tuning strings up to a higher pitch.

==== Open D ====
The open D tuning (D–A–D–F♯–A–D), also called "Vestapol" tuning, is a common open tuning used by European and American / Western guitarists working with alternative tunings. The Allman Brothers Band instrumental "Little Martha" used an open D tuning raised one half step, giving an open E^{♭} tuning with the same intervallic relationships as open D.

==== Open C ====
The English guitar used a repetitive open C tuning (with distinct open notes C–E–G–C–E–G) that approximated a major-thirds tuning. This tuning is evident in William Ackerman's song "Townsend Shuffle", as well as by John Fahey for his tribute to Mississippi John Hurt.

The C–C–G–C–E–G tuning uses some of the harmonic sequence (overtones) of the note C. This overtone-series tuning was modified by Mick Ralphs, who used a high C note rather than the high G note for "Can't Get Enough" on Bad Company. Ralphs said, "It needs the open C to have that ring," and "it never really sounds right in standard tuning".

==== Open G ====
Mick Ralphs' open C tuning was originally an open G tuning, which listed the initial six overtones of the G note, namely G–G–D–G–B–D; Ralphs used this open G tuning for "Hey Hey" and while writing the demo of "Can't Get Enough".

Open-G tuning usually refers to D–G–D–G–B–D. The open G tuning variant G–G–D–G–B–D was used by Joni Mitchell for "Electricity", "For the Roses", and "Hunter (The Good Samaritan)". Truncating this tuning to G–D–G–B–D, for his five-string guitar, Keith Richards uses this overtones-tuning on the Rolling Stones's "Honky Tonk Women", "Brown Sugar" and "Start Me Up".

The seven-string Russian guitar uses the open G tuning D–G–B–D–G–B–D, which contains mostly major and minor thirds.

==== Creating any kind of open tuning ====
Any kind of chordal tuning can be achieved, simply by using the notes in the chord and tuning the strings to those notes. For example, A^{sus4} has the notes A, D, E; by tuning the strings to only those notes, it creates a chordal A^{sus4} tuning.

Power chord (fifths) open tunings:
A^{5}	E–A–E–A–A–E
B^{5}	F^{♯}–B–F^{♯}–B–B–F^{♯}
C^{5}	C–G–C–G–G–G
D^{5}	D–A–D–A–D–D
E^{5}	E–B–E–E–B–E
F^{5}	F–C–C–C–C–F
G^{5}	D–G–D–G–D–G

Bass players may omit the last two strings.

=== Minor or "cross-note" tunings ===
Cross-note tunings include a minor third, so giving a minor chord with open strings. Fretting the minor-third string at the first fret produces a major-third, so allowing a one-finger fretting of a major chord. By contrast, it is more difficult to fret a minor chord using an open major-chord tuning.

Bukka White and Skip James are well known for using cross-note E-minor (E B E G B E) in their music, as in 'Hard Time Killin Floor Blues'.

=== Other open chordal tunings ===
Some guitarists choose open tunings that use more complex chords, which gives them more available intervals on the open strings. C^{6}, E^{6}, E^{7}, E^{6/9} and other such tunings are common among lap-steel players such as Hawaiian slack-key guitarists and country guitarists, and are also sometimes applied to the regular guitar by bottleneck (a slide repurposed from a glass bottle) players striving to emulate these styles. A common C^{6} tuning, for example, is C–E–G–A–C–E, which provides open major and minor thirds, open major and minor sixths, fifths, and octaves. By contrast, most open major or open minor tunings provide only octaves, fifths, and either a major third/sixth or a minor third/sixth—but not both. Don Helms of Hank Williams band favored C^{6} tuning; slack-key artist Henry Kaleialoha Allen uses a modified C^{6/7} (C^{6} tuning with a B♭ on the bottom); Harmon Davis favored E^{7} tuning; David Gilmour has used an open G^{6} tuning.

=== Modal tunings ===
Modal tunings are open tunings in which the open strings of the guitar do not produce a tertian (i.e., major or minor, or variants thereof) chord. The strings may be tuned to exclusively present a single interval (all fourths; all fifths; etc.) or they may be tuned to a non-tertian chord (unresolved suspensions such as E–A–B–E–A–E, for example). Modal open tunings may use only one or two pitch classes across all strings (as, for example, some metal guitarists who tune each string to either E or B, forming "power chords" of ambiguous major/minor tonality).

Popular modal tunings include D Modal (D-G-D-G-B-E) and C Modal (C-G-D-G-B-D).

=== Lowered (standard) ===
Derived from standard EADGBE, all the strings are tuned lower by the same interval, thus providing the same chord positions transposed to a lower key. Lower tunings are popular among rock and heavy metal bands. The reason for tuning down below the standard pitch is usually either to accommodate a singer's vocal range or to get a deeper/heavier sound or pitch. Common examples include:

==== E♭ tuning ====
Rock guitarists (such as Jimi Hendrix on the songs "Voodoo Child (Slight Return)" and "Little Wing") occasionally tune all their strings down by one semitone to obtain E♭ tuning. This makes the strings easier to bend when playing and with standard fingering results in a lower key. It also facilitates E shape fingerings when playing with horn instruments. Grunge band Nirvana also used this tuning extensively throughout their career, which they used occasionally on their album Bleach, and on every song from In Utero. Guns N' Roses guitarist Slash also commonly uses E♭ tuning on songs such as 'Sweet Child o' Mine' and 'Welcome to the Jungle'. Thrash metal band Metallica mainly used E♭ Tuning on their album's Load & Reload.

Many older bands use E♭ tuning during live shows to play songs originally recorded in standard tuning: this is usually to make it easier for the (often aging) singer. Examples include Led Zeppelin's 2007 reunion concert, where most of their set list was played in E♭, and Metallica, who have performed most of their standard tuned songs a half step down (or a full step down in the case of "Seek and Destroy") since 1995.

==== D tuning ====
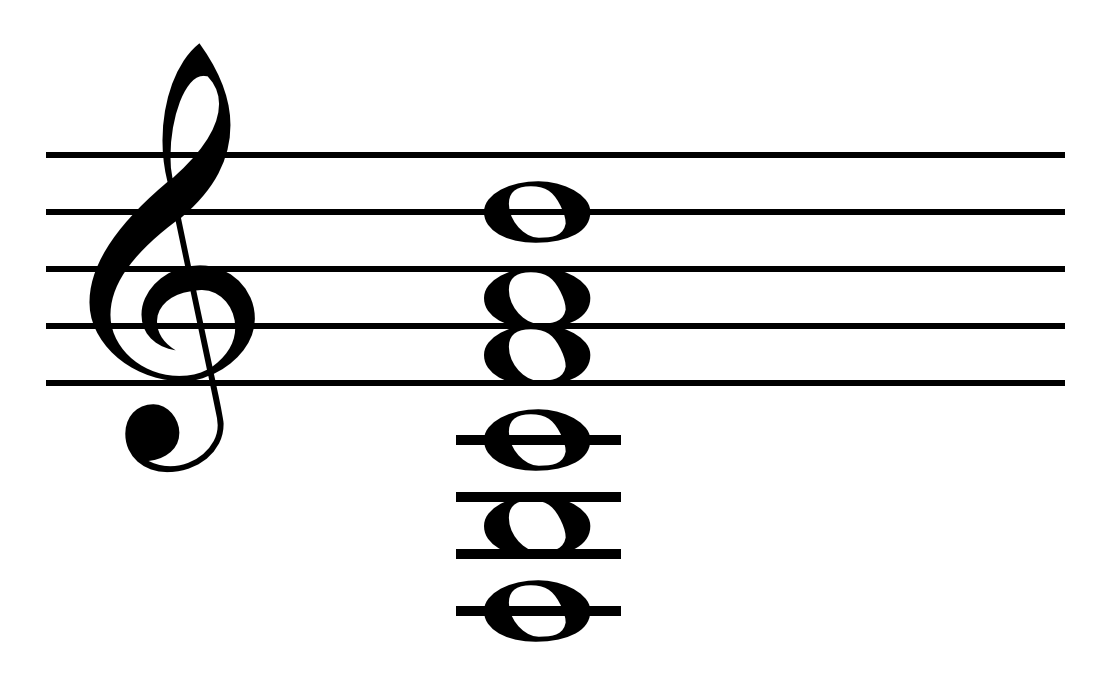
D tuning

D Tuning, also called One Step Lower, Whole Step Down, Full Step or D Standard, is another alternative. Each string is lowered by a whole tone (two semitones) resulting in D-G-C-F-A-D. It is used mostly by heavy metal bands to achieve a heavier, deeper sound, and by blues guitarists, who use it to accommodate string bending and by 12-string guitar players to reduce the mechanical load on their instrument. Among musicians, Elliott Smith was known to use D tuning as his main tuning for his music. It was also used for several songs on the Velvet Underground's album The Velvet Underground & Nico. Thrash metal band Megadeth has also been using this tuning since their album Dystopia to facilitate frontman Dave Mustaine's age and voice after his battle with throat cancer. Metallica have used this tuning for select songs such as 'The Thing That Should Not Be', 'Sad But True', 'Devil's Dance', and 'Dream No More'.

== Regular tunings ==
Regular tunings
- For regular guitar-tunings, the distance between consecutive open strings is a constant musical-interval, measured by semitones on the chromatic circle. The chromatic circle lists the twelve notes of the octave.

Basic information
- Aliases: Uniform tunings

Advanced information
- Advantages: Simplifies learning by beginners and improvisation by advanced guitarists
- Disadvantages: Replicating the open chords ("cowboy chords") of standard tuning is difficult; intermediate guitarists must relearn the fretboard and chords.

Regular tunings (semitones)
- Trivial (0)
- Minor thirds (3)
- Major thirds (4)
- All fourths (5)
- Augmented fourths (6)
- New standard (7, 3)
- All fifths (7)
- Minor sixths (8)

In the standard guitar tuning, one major-third interval is interjected amid four perfect-fourth intervals. In each regular tuning, all string successions have the same interval.

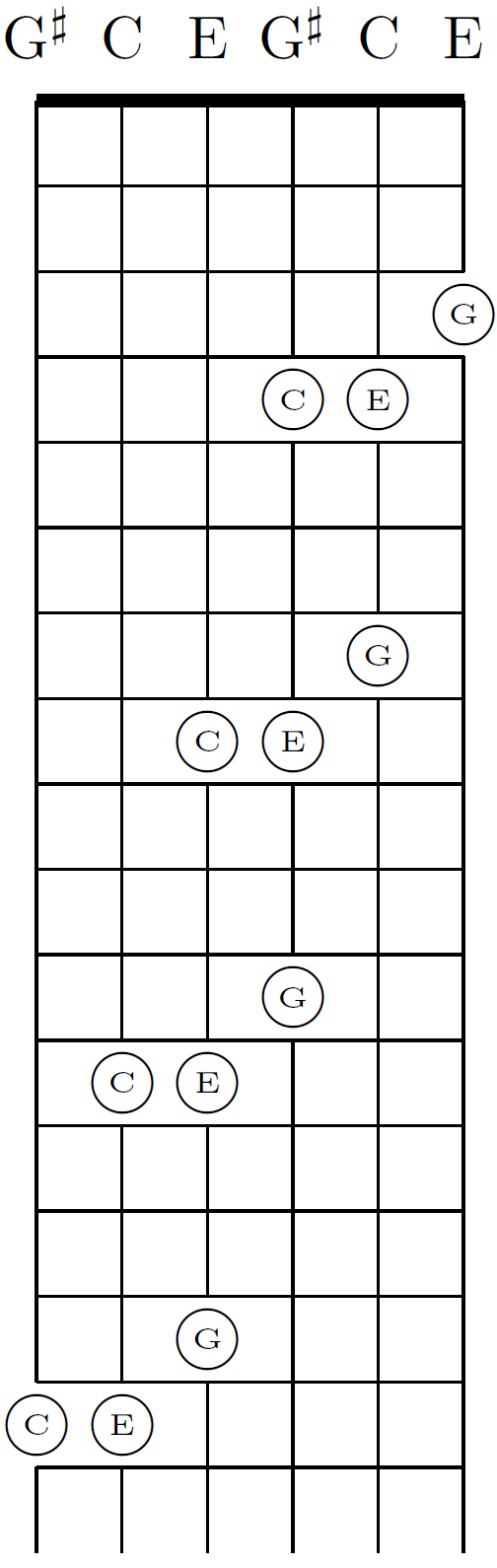
Chords can be shifted diagonally in major-thirds tuning and other regular tunings. In standard tuning, chords change their shape because of the irregular major-third G-B.

In standard tuning, there is an interval of a major third between the second and third strings, and all the other intervals are fourths. This means chords cannot be shifted around the fretboard in the standard tuning E–A–D–G–B–E, which requires four chord-shapes for the major chords. There are separate chord-forms for chords having their root note on the third, fourth, fifth, and sixth strings. These are called inversions.

In contrast, regular tunings have equal intervals between the strings, and so they have symmetrical scales all along the fretboard. This makes it simpler to translate chords. For the regular tunings, chords may be moved diagonally around the fretboard. The diagonal movement of chords is especially simple for the regular tunings that are repetitive, in which case chords can be moved vertically: Chords can be moved three strings up (or down) in major-thirds tuning, and chords can be moved two strings up (or down) in augmented-fourths tuning. Regular tunings thus appeal to new guitarists and also to jazz-guitarists, whose improvisation is simplified by regular intervals.

On the other hand, five- and six-string open chords ("cowboy chords") are more difficult to play in a regular tuning than in standard tuning. Instructional literature uses standard tuning. Traditionally a course begins with the hand in first position, that is, with the left-hand covering frets 1–4. Beginning players first learn open chords belonging to the major keys C, G, and D. Guitarists who play mainly open chords in these three major-keys and their relative minor-keys (Am, Em, Bm) may prefer standard tuning over many regular tunings, On the other hand, minor-thirds tuning features many barre chords with repeated notes, properties that appeal to acoustic-guitarists and beginners.

=== Major thirds and perfect fourths ===
Standard tuning mixes a major third (M3) with its perfect fourths. Regular tunings that are based on either major thirds or perfect fourths are used, for example, in jazz.

All fourths tuning E_{2}–A_{2}–D_{3}–G_{3}–C_{4}–F_{4} keeps the lowest four strings of standard tuning, changing the major third to a perfect fourth. Jazz musician Stanley Jordan stated that all-fourths tuning "simplifies the fingerboard, making it logical".

Major-thirds tuning (M3 tuning) is a regular tuning in which the musical intervals between successive strings are each major thirds, for example E_{2}–G♯_{2}–C_{3}–E_{3}–G♯_{3}–C_{4}. Unlike all-fourths and all-fifths tuning, M3 tuning repeats its octave after three strings, which simplifies the learning of chords and improvisation. This repetition provides the guitarist with many possibilities for fingering chords. With six strings, major-thirds tuning has a smaller range than standard tuning; with seven strings, the major-thirds tuning covers the range of standard tuning on six strings.

Major-thirds tunings require less hand-stretching than other tunings, because each M3 tuning packs the octave's twelve notes into four consecutive frets. The major-third intervals let the guitarist play major chords and minor chords with two three consecutive fingers on two consecutive frets.

Chord inversion is especially simple in major-thirds tuning. The guitarist can invert chords by raising one or two notes on three strings—playing the raised notes with the same finger as the original notes. In contrast, inverting triads in standard and all-fourths tuning requires three fingers on a span of four frets. In standard tuning, the shape of an inversion depends on the involvement of the major-third between the 2nd and 3rd strings.

=== All fifths and "new standard tuning" ===
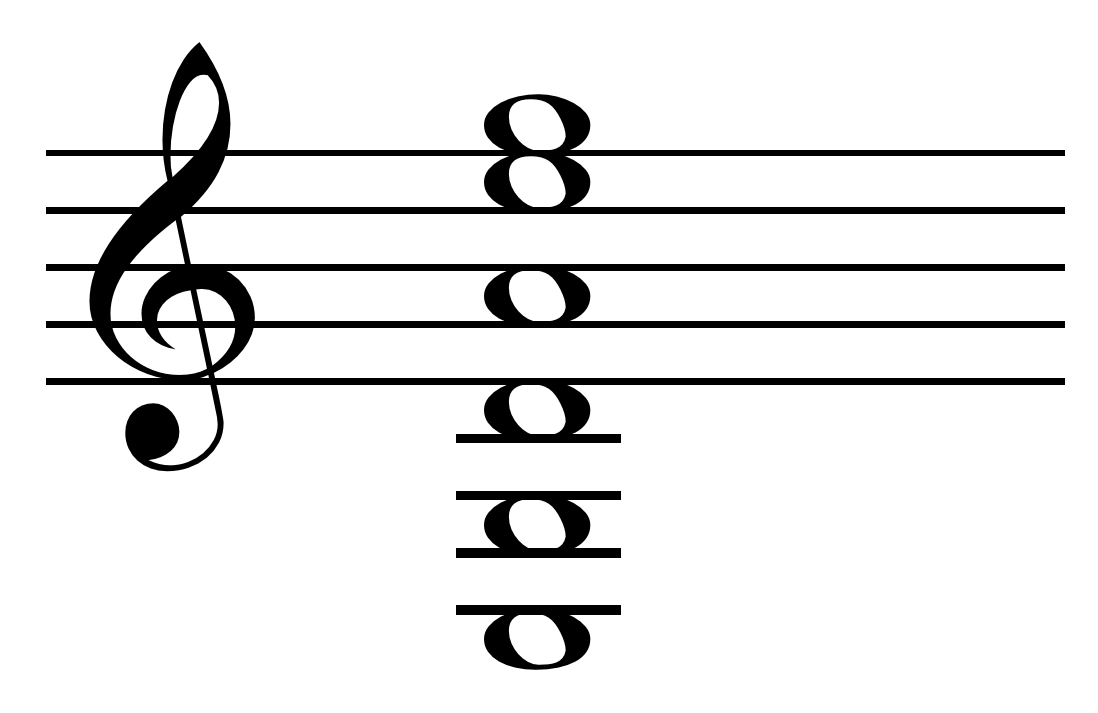
New standard tuning.

New Standard Tuning's open strings

C_{2}–G_{2}–D_{3}–A_{3}–E_{4}–B_{4}

All-fifths tuning is a tuning in intervals of perfect fifths like that of a mandolin or a violin; other names include "perfect fifths" and "fifths". It has a wide range. Its implementation has been impossible with nylon strings and has been difficult with conventional steel strings. The high B makes the first string very taut, and consequently, a conventionally gauged string easily breaks.

Jazz guitarist Carl Kress used a variation of all-fifths tuning—with the bottom four strings in fifths, and the top two strings in thirds, resulting in B♭_{1}–F_{2}–C_{3}–G_{3}–B_{3}–D_{4}. This facilitated tenor banjo chord shapes on the bottom four strings and plectrum banjo chord shapes on the top four strings. Contemporary New York jazz-guitarist Marty Grosz uses this tuning.

All-fifths tuning has been approximated by the so-called "New Standard Tuning" (NST) of King Crimson's Robert Fripp, in which NST replaces all-fifths' high B_{4} with a high G_{4}. To build chords, Fripp uses "perfect intervals in fourths, fifths and octaves", so avoiding minor thirds and especially major thirds, which are slightly sharp in equal temperament tuning (in comparison to thirds in just intonation). It is a challenge to adapt conventional guitar-chords to new standard tuning, which is based on all-fifths tuning. (Note: Musicologist Eric Tamm wrote that despite "considerable effort and search I just could not find a good set of chords whose sound I liked" for rhythm guitar.) Some closely voiced jazz chords become impractical in NST and all-fifths tuning.

== Instrumental tunings ==
These are tunings in which some or all strings are retuned to emulate the standard tuning of some other instrument, such as a lute, banjo, cittern, mandolin, etc. Many of these tunings overlap other categories, especially open and modal tunings.

== Miscellaneous or "special" tunings ==
This category includes everything that does not fit into any of the other categories, for example (but not limited to): tunings designated only for a particular piece; non-western intervals and modes; micro- or macro-tones (half sharps/flats, etc.); and "hybrid tunings" combining features of major alternate tuning categories – most commonly an open tuning with the lowest string dropped.

== See also ==
- Bass guitar tuning
- List of guitar tunings
- Music and mathematics
- Open G tuning
- Stringed instrument tunings
- DADGAD
