= Melveen Leed =

American singer (born 1943)

Melveen Leed (born on Molokai island in 1943, Hawaii) is an American singer. She graduated from Radford High School in Honolulu. After winning the title of "Miss Molokai" she began singing in the mid-1960s and has released a number of records in the genres of Hawaiian, country, and jazz music.

She won the Na Hoku Hanohano Award for Best Female Vocalist in 1978, 1979, 1981, 1984 and 1987. She has had several guest roles on Hawaii Five-O and sang at the Grand Ole Opry. She has performed in Hawaii, Las Vegas, Japan and on the west coast of California.

She was the anchor performer at the International Marketplace in Waikiki every Saturday from 2011 until the Marketplaces's closing in December, 2014. She performed in the Hawaiian Summer Concert at Carnegie Hall, in 2014.

== Recordings ==
- Best of Melveen, Vol. II
- Grand Old Hawaiian Music, Nashville Style
- Hawaiian Country Girl
- I Love You, Hawai'i
- Melveen's Hawaiian Country Hits, Vols. I and II
- My Isle of Golden Dreams
- A Part of Me, A Part of You
- Sur Cette Plage
- With the Best of Slack Key

She also recorded these albums with a group "The Local Divas", consisting of her, Carole Kai, Loyal Garner and Nohelani Cypriano:

- Local Diva's Christmas
- Timeless
