= List of stage names: K =

This list of stage names lists names used by those in the entertainment industry, alphabetically by their stage name's surname (or the best approximation) followed by the given name (or the best approximation) where the surname begins with "K". One-word stage names are presented in List of one-word stage names.

| Stage name | Birth name | Life | Notability | Notes |
|---|---|---|---|---|
| Greg K. | Gregory David Kriesel | 1965– | American musician (The Offspring) | |
| Positive K | Darryl Gibson | 1967– | American rapper | |
| Shad K | Shadrach Kabango | 1982– | Canadian rapper | Also known as "Shad" |
| Special K | Kevin Keaton | 1963– | American rapper | |
| Tracey K | Tracey Kelliher | Unknown | Irish singer and songwriter | |
| Ya Kid K | Manuela Barbara Kamosi Moaso Djogi | 1972– | Congolese-Belgian musician (Technotronic) | |
| Yaki Kadafi | Yafeu Akiyele Fula | 1977–1996 | American rapper (Outlawz) | |
| Takeshi Kaga | Shigekatsu Katsuta | 1950– | Japanese actor | |
| Carole Kai | Carole Shimizu | 1944– | American musician | Also known as Carol Kai |
| Musa Kaleem | Orlando Wright | 1921–1988 | American musician | |
| Mindy Kaling | Vera Mindy Chokalingam | 1979– | American actress, comedian, screenwriter and producer | |
| Stefan Kalipha | Stephen Siegfried Behrendt | 1940– | Trinidadian actor | |
| Hemmo Kallio | Herman Puttonen | 1863–1940 | Finnish actor | |
| Ini Kamoze | Cecil Campbell | 1957– | Jamaican musician | |
| Sean Kanan | Sean Perelman | 1966– | American actor | |
| Artie Kane | Aaron Cohen | 1929–2022 | American pianist, composer and conductor | |
| Big Daddy Kane | Antonio Hardy | 1968– | American rapper, producer and actor (Juice Crew) | |
| Fred Kaps | Abraham Bongers | 1926–1980 | Dutch magician | |
| James Karen | Jacob Karnofsky | 1923–2018 | American character actor | |
| Tzeni Karezi | Evgenia Karpouzi | 1932–1992 | Greek actress | |
| Maya Karin | Maya Karin Roelcke | 1979– | Malaysian actress, television personality and singer | |
| Rita Karin | Rita Karpinowicz | 1919–1993 | Polish-American actress | |
| Anna Karina | Hanne Karin Blarke Bayer | 1940–2019 | Danish-French actress, director, writer, model and singer | |
| Olga Karlatos | Olga Vlassopulos | 1945– | Greek-Bermudian actress and lawyer | |
| John Karlen | John Adam Karlewicz | 1933–2020 | American character actor | |
| Miriam Karlin | Miriam Samuels | 1925–2011 | English actress | |
| Boris Karloff | William Henry Pratt | 1887–1969 | English actor | |
| Mick Karn | Andonis Michaelides | 1958–2011 | Cypriot-English musician (Japan) | |
| Richard Karn | Richard Karn Wilson | 1956– | American actor and comedian | |
| Fred Karno | Frederick Westcott | 1866–1941 | English theatre manager | |
| Mariana Karr | María Coppola-González | 1949–2016 | Argentine-Mexican actress | |
| Vasilis Karras | Vasilis Kesogidlis | 1953– | Greek folk singer | |
| Vybz Kartel | Adidja Palmer | 1976– | Jamaican musician | |
| Shizuko Kasagi | Shizuko Kamei | 1914–1985 | Japanese jazz singer and actress | |
| Anna Kashfi | Joan O'Callaghan | 1934–2015 | British actress | |
| Philippe Katerine | Philippe Blanchard | 1968– | French singer-songwriter, actor, director and writer | |
| Katherine Kath | Rose Marie Lily Faess | 1920–2012 | French ballerina | |
| Shintaro Katsu | Toshio Okumura | 1931–1997 | Japanese actor, singer and dancer | |
| Beatrice Kay | Hannah Beatrice Kuper | 1907–1986 | American actress | |
| Charles Kay | Charles Piff | 1930–2025 | English actor | |
| Connie Kay | Conrad Kirnon | 1927–1994 | American musician (Modern Jazz Quartet) | |
| Crystal Kay | Crystal Kay Williams | 1986– | Japanese singer, songwriter, actress and radio presenter | |
| John Kay | Joachim Frauledat | 1944– | German-American singer, songwriter and musician (Steppenwolf) | |
| Jay Kay | Jason Luís Cheetham | 1969– | English singer-songwriter (Jamiroquai) | |
| Lesli Kay | Lesli Kay Pushkin | 1965– | American actress | |
| Celia Kaye | Celia Kay Burkholder | 1942– | American actress | |
| Danny Kaye | David Daniel Kaminsky | 1911–1987 | American comedian, actor, singer and dancer | |
| David Kaye | David Hope | 1964– | Canadian voice actor | |
| Sammy Kaye | Samuel Zarnocay | 1910–1987 | American bandleader and songwriter | |
| Stubby Kaye | Bernard Kotzen | 1918–1997 | American actor and comedian | |
| Thorsten Kaye | Thorsten Kieselbach | 1966– | German-American actor | |
| Elia Kazan | Elias Kazanjoglou | 1909–2003 | American director, producer, screenwriter and actor | |
| Lainie Kazan | Lainie Levine | 1940– | American actress and singer | |
| Ernie K-Doe | Ernest Kador Jr. | 1933–2001 | American singer | |
| Staci Keanan | Anastasia Sagorsky | 1975– | American attorney and former actress | |
| Michael Keaton | Michael John Douglas | 1951– | American actor | |
| Chief Keef | Keith Farrelle Cozart | 1995– | American rapper, singer, songwriter and record producer | |
| Tom Keene | George Duryea | 1896–1943 | American actor | |
| Andrew Keir | Andrew Buggy | 1926–1997 | Scottish actor | |
| Byron Keith | Cletus Leo Schwitters | 1917–1996 | American actor | Also known as Clete Lee |
| Donald Keith | Francis Feeney | 1903–1969 | American actor | |
| Ian Keith | Keith Ross | 1899–1960 | American actor | |
| Kool Keith | Keith Thornton | 1963– | American rapper and producer | |
| Penelope Keith | Penelope Hatfield | 1940– | English actress | |
| Robert Keith | Rolland Keith Richey | 1898–1966 | American actor | |
| Toby Keith | Toby Keith Covel | 1961– | American country singer, songwriter, actor and record producer | |
| Killa Kela | Lee Potter | 1979– | English beatboxer and rapper | |
| Keri Kelli | Kenneth Fear Jr. | 1971– | American musician | |
| Roy Kellino | Philip Roy Gislingham | 1912–1956 | English film director, producer and cinematographer | |
| W. P. Kellino | William Philip Gislingham | 1874–1957 | English musician, performer and film director | |
| Angel Kelly | Pamela Moore | 1962– | American pornographic actress | |
| Jonathan Kelly | Jonathan Ledingham | 1947–2020 | Irish singer | |
| Shotgun Tom Kelly | Thomas Irwin | 1949– | American radio and television personality | |
| Jackie Kelso | John Kelson Jr. | 1922–2012 | American jazz musician (The Capp-Pierce Juggernaut) | |
| Ed Kemmer | Edward Kemmerer | 1921–2004 | American actor | |
| William Hunter Kendal | William Hunter Grimston | 1843–1917 | English actor | |
| Marie Kendall | Mary Holyome | 1873–1964 | English comedienne and actress | |
| Tony Kendall | Luciano Stella | 1936–2009 | Italian actor | |
| Emma Kennedy | Elizabeth Emma Williams | 1967– | English actress | |
| Kevin Kennedy | Kevin Williams | 1961– | English actor and musician | |
| Merna Kennedy | Maude Kahler | 1908–1944 | American actress | |
| Tom Kennedy | James Narz | 1927–2020 | American television personality | |
| Big Kenny | William Alphin | 1963– | American singer (Big & Rich) | |
| Allegra Kent | Iris Cohen | 1937– | American ballet dancer, actress, author and columnist | |
| Jean Kent | Joan Summerfield | 1921–2013 | English actress | |
| Paul Kent | Paul Ingelese | 1930–2011 | American actor and director | |
| Paula Kent | Paula Baer | 1931–2014 | American executive and philanthropist | |
| Annette Kerr | Catherine Annette Kerr Peacock | 1920–2013 | Scottish actress | |
| Deborah Kerr | Deborah Jane Trimmer | 1921–2007 | Scottish actress | |
| Margaret Kerry | Margaret Lynch | 1929– | American actress | |
| Norman Kerry | Arnold Kaiser | 1894–1956 | American actor | |
| cEvin Key | Kevin Crompton | 1961– | Canadian musician, songwriter, producer and composer (Skinny Puppy) | Also known as Scaremeister |
| T'Keyah Crystal Keymáh | Crystal Walker | 1962– | American actress and singer | |
| Alicia Keys | Alicia Cook | 1981– | American singer-songwriter | |
| Mia Khalifa | Sarah Joe Chamoun | 1993– | Lebanese-American former pornographic actress | |
| Wiz Khalifa | Cameron Thomaz | 1987– | American rapper | |
| Chaka Khan | Carole Stevens | 1953– | American singer (Rufus) | |
| Cynthia Khan | Li-Tsang Yang | 1968– | Taiwanese actress | |
| Junaid Khan | Junaid Khan Niazi | 1981– | Pakistani actor, producer and singer-songwriter | |
| Shakib Khan | Masud Rana | 1979– | Bangladeshi actor and producer | |
| Mary Kid | Marie Keul | 1901–1988 | German actress | |
| Simple Kid | Kieran Macfeely | | Irish singer-songwriter and musician | |
| Johnny Kidd | Frederick Heath | 1935–1966 | English singer-songwriter (Johnny Kidd & the Pirates) | |
| Michael Kidd | Milton Greenwald | 1915–2007 | American choreographer, dancer and actor | |
| Udo Kier | Udo Kierspe | 1944–2025 | German actor | |
| Masta Killa | Elgin Turner | 1969– | American rapper (Wu-Tang Clan) | |
| Ghostface Killah | Dennis Coles | 1970– | American rapper (Wu-Tang Clan) | |
| Bounty Killer | Rodney Price | 1972– | Jamaican deejay | |
| Cut Killer | Anouar Hajoui | 1971– | Moroccan-French DJ and record producer | |
| Natalia Kills | Natalia Keery-Fisher | 1986– | English singer and actress (Cruel Youth) | |
| Andy Kim | Andrew Youakim | 1946– | Canadian singer and songwriter | |
| Lil' Kim | Kimberly Jones | 1974– | American rapper | |
| Sandra Kim | Sandra Calderone | 1972– | Belgian singer | |
| Ras Kimono | Ekeleke Elumelu | 1958–2018 | Nigerian musician | |
| Alan King | Irwin Alan Kniberg | 1927–2004 | American actor and comedian | |
| Albert King | Albert Nelson | 1923–1992 | American musician | |
| Andrea King | Georgette André Barry | 1919–2003 | American actress | |
| Anita King | Anita Keppen | 1884–1963 | American actress | |
| Ash King | Ashutosh Ganguly | 1980– | British singer, songwriter and composer | |
| Ben E. King | Benjamin Earl Nelson | 1938–2015 | American singer and record producer | |
| Carole King | Carole Klein | 1942– | American singer-songwriter and musician | |
| Earl King | Earl Johnson IV | 1934–2003 | American singer, musician and songwriter | |
| Kip King | Jerome Kattan | 1937–2010 | American actor | |
| Larry King | Lawrence Zeiger | 1933–2021 | American television and radio presenter | |
| Morgana King | Maria Grazia Morgana Messina | 1930–2018 | American jazz singer and actress | |
| Pee Wee King | Julius Kuczynski | 1914–2000 | American country singer-songwriter | |
| Sonny King | Luigi Schiavone | 1922–2006 | American singer | |
| Zalman King | Zalman Lefkowitz | 1941–2012 | American director, writer, producer and actor | |
| Ben Kingsley | Krishna Banji | 1943– | English actor | |
| Natalie Kingston | Natalia Ringstrom | 1905–1991 | American actress | |
| Sean Kingston | Kisean Anderson | 1990– | American singer and rapper | |
| Kathleen Kinmont | Kathleen Kinmont Smith | 1965– | American actress | |
| Klaus Kinski | Klaus Nakszyński | 1926–1991 | German actor | |
| Nastassja Kinski | Nastassja Nakszyński | 1961– | German actress | |
| Bruce Kirby | Bruno Quidaciolu | 1925–2021 | American character actor | |
| Bruno Kirby | Bruno Quidaciolu Jr. | 1949–2006 | American actor | |
| Jack Kirby | Jacob Kurtzberg | 1917–1994 | American comic book artist, writer and editor | |
| Milos Kirek | Miloš Kučírek | 1946–1993 | Czech actor | |
| Phyllis Kirk | Phyllis Kirkegaard | 1927–2006 | American actress | |
| Katie Kissoon | Katherine Farthing | 1951– | Trinidadian singer (Mac and Katie Kissoon) | |
| Eartha Kitt | Eartha Keith | 1927–2008 | American singer and actress | |
| Miss Kittin | Caroline Hervé | 1973– | French music producer, DJ, singer and songwriter | |
| Alisha Klass | Alicia Pieri | 1972– | American former pornographic actress | |
| Harry Klynn | Vasilis Triantafillidis | 1940–2018 | Greek comedian and singer | |
| Beverley Knight | Beverley Smith | 1973– | English singer, songwriter, actress and radio personality | |
| June Knight | Margaret Valliquietto | 1913–1987 | American actress and singer | |
| Marjorie Knight | Patricia Heintzen | 1915–2004 | American actress | |
| Robert Knight | Robert Peebles | 1940–2017 | American singer | |
| Ted Knight | Tadeusz Konopka | 1923–1986 | American actor | |
| Dr. Know | Gary Miller | 1958– | American musician (Bad Brains) | |
| Barbara Knox | Barbara Brothwood | 1933– | English actress | |
| Betty Knox | Alice Elizabeth Peden | 1906–1963 | American dancer and journalist | |
| Elyse Knox | Elsie Kornbrath | 1917–2012 | American actress, model and fashion designer | |
| Nick Knox | Nick Stephanoff | 1953–2018 | American musician (The Cramps) | |
| Johnny Knoxville | Philip John Clapp | 1971– | American actor, producer and writer | |
| Bobby Knutt | Robert Wass | 1945–2017 | English actor and comedian | |
| Ruth Kobart | Ruth Kahn | 1924–2002 | American actress | |
| Oja Kodar | Olga Palinkaš | 1941– | Croatian actress, screenwriter and director | |
| King Kolax | William Little | 1912–1991 | American jazz musician and bandleader | |
| Caroline Kole | Caroline Kudelko | 1997– | American singer, songwriter and musician | |
| Ajith Kollam | Ajith Haridas | 1962–2018 | Indian actor | |
| Krzysztof Komeda | Krzysztof Trzciński | 1931–1969 | Polish composer and musician | |
| Liliana Komorowska | Liliana Głąbczyńska | 1956– | Polish actress and filmmaker | |
| Andrei Konchalovsky | Andrei Mikhalkov | 1937– | Russian filmmaker | |
| Al Kooper | Al Kuperschmidt | 1944– | American retired songwriter, record producer and musician (Blood, Sweat & Tears) | |
| Alexander Korda | Sándor Kellner | 1893–1956 | Hungarian-English film director, producer and screenwriter | |
| Véra Korène | Rébecca Véra Korestzky | 1901–1996 | Russian-French actress and singer | |
| Baltasar Kormákur | Baltasar Kormkákur Samper | 1966– | Icelandic actor, director and producer | |
| Fritz Kortner | Fritz Kohn | 1892–1970 | Austrian actor and director | |
| Uncle Kracker | Matthew Shafer | 1974– | American singer, rapper and musician | |
| Billy J. Kramer | William Ashton | 1943– | English singer | |
| Marta Kristen | Birgit Rusanen | 1945– | Norwegian-American actress | |
| Liv Kristine | Liv Kristine Espenæs | 1976– | Norwegian singer | |
| Diane Kruger | Diane Heidkrüger | 1976– | German actress | |
| Olek Krupa | Aleksander Krupa | 1947– | Polish-American actor | |
| Akshay Kumar | Rajiv Bhatia | 1967– | Indian-Canadian actor | |
| Ashok Kumar | Kumudlal Ganguly | 1911–2001 | Indian actor | |
| Dilip Kumar | Muhammad Khan | 1922–2021 | Indian actor | |
| Kishore Kumar | Abhas Kumar Ganguly | 1929–1987 | Indian singer and actor | |
| Susumu Kurobe | Takashi Yoshimoto | 1939– | Japanese actor | |
| Stanley Kwan | Jinpang Guan | 1957– | Hong Kong film director and producer | |
