= Music of Hawaii =

The music of Hawaii includes an array of traditional and popular styles, ranging from native Hawaiian folk music to modern rock and hip hop. Styles like slack-key guitar are well known worldwide, while Hawaiian-tinged music is a frequent part of Hollywood soundtracks. Hawaii also made a contribution to country music with the introduction of the steel guitar. In addition, the music which began to be played by Puerto Ricans in Hawaii in the early 1900s is called cachi cachi music, on the islands of Hawaii.

The traditional music of Hawaii's Native Hawaiian community is largely religious in nature, and includes chanting and dance music. Hawaiian music has had a notable impact on the music of other Polynesian islands; Peter Manuel called the influence of Hawaiian music a "unifying factor in the development of modern Pacific musics".

== Music festivals and venues ==
Major music festivals in Hawaii include the Merrie Monarch Hula Festival, which brings together hula groups from across the world, as well as a number of slack-key and steel guitar festivals: Big Island Slack Key Guitar Festival, Steel Guitar Association Festival and the Gabby Pahinui/Atta Isaacs Slack Key Festival. April's Aloha Week is a popular tourist attraction, as is the Moloka'i Music Festival held around Labor Day. There was also a Hawaii International Jazz Festival, which ran from 1993 until 2007. The annual Pacific Rim Jazz Festival occurs in mid-autumn at the Hawaii Convention Center. The annual Manoa Jazz & Heritage Festival takes place in early autumn at the Andrews Amphitheatre on the University of Hawaiʻi at Mānoa campus.

Hawaii is home to numerous hotels, many of which feature music in the afternoon or evening; some of the more prominent ones include the Kahala Hilton, the Sheraton Moana Hotel, the Sheraton Waikiki, the Halekulani, Casanova's and the King Kamehameha Hotel. Large music venues in Hawaii include the University of Hawaiʻi at Hilo Performing Arts Center, which has 600 seats and is the largest venue on the Big Island. A 560-seat venue and cultural exhibition center on Kauai is the Kauai Community College Performing Arts Center. In Honolulu, the Neal S. Blaisdell Center Arena, Concert Hall, and Exhibition Hall are three of the largest venues in the state. Other venues for Hawaiian music on Oahu include the Waikiki Shell, an establishment used primarily for concerts and entertainment purposes. Over the years many local, as well as international artists, have graced the stage there. It is a unique outdoor theater located in Kapiolani Park. This venue seats 2,400 persons, with the capacity to hold up to 6,000 more on the lawn area. Concerts, graduation ceremonies, and hula shows are very popular at this site, as well as Kennedy Theatre and Andrews Amphitheatre on the campus of the University of Hawaiʻi at Mānoa, the Blaisdell Center Concert Hall, the Hawaii Theatre in downtown Honolulu, the Red Elephant (a performance space and recording studio in downtown Honolulu), Paliku Theatre on the campus of Windward Community College, and the Leeward Community College Theatre. The historic Lanai Theatre is a cultural landmark on Lanai, dating back to the 1930s.

== Music institutions and industry ==
Hawaii is home to a number of renowned music institutions in several fields. The Honolulu Symphony Orchestra is an important part of the state's musical history, and is the oldest orchestra in the United States west of the Rocky Mountains, founded in 1900. The Orchestra has collaborated with other local institutions, like the Hawaii Opera Theatre and the Oʻahu Choral Society, which sponsors the Honolulu Symphony Chorus and the Honolulu Chamber Choir.

Numerous businesses have been created supporting the special musical styles and instruments suited to the Hawaiian musical tradition. The Guitar and Lute Workshop was an early manufacturer and proponent of specialty slack-key guitars in the early 1970s, and the Kamaka Ukulele company was established as key manufacturer of ukuleles for Hawaiian musical acts.

== Folk music ==
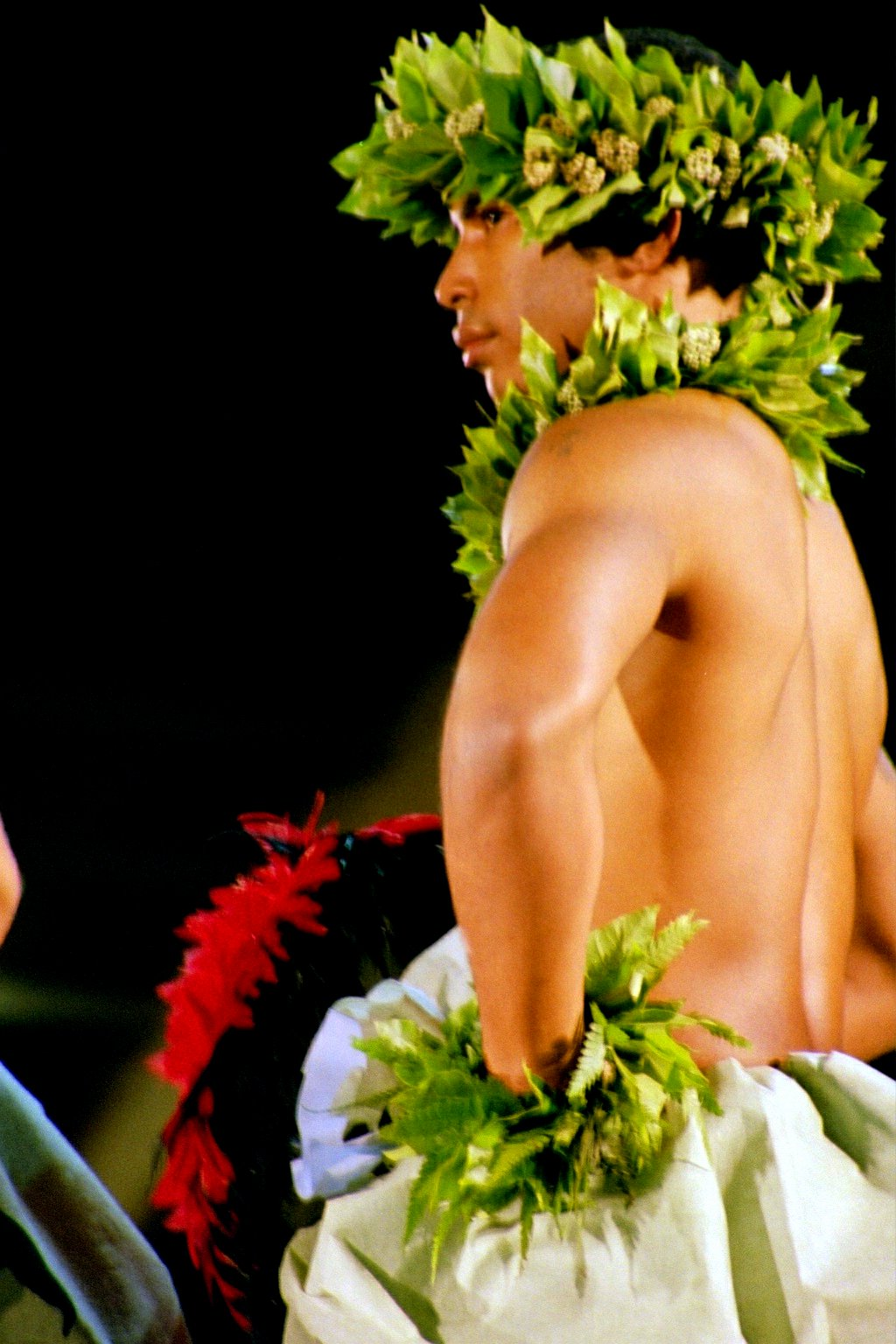
Dancer with ʻuliʻuli, hula kahiko competition, Merrie Monarch Festival 2003

Hawaiian folk music includes several varieties of chanting (mele) and music meant for highly ritualized dance (hula). Traditional Hawaiian music and dance was functional, used to express praise, communicate genealogy and mythology, and accompany games, festivals and other secular events. The Hawaiian language has no word that translates precisely as music, but a diverse vocabulary exists to describe rhythms, instruments, styles and elements of voice production. Hawaiian folk music is simple in melody and rhythm, but is "complex and rich" in the "poetry, accompanying mimetic dance (hula), and subtleties of vocal styles... even in the attenuated forms in which they survive today".

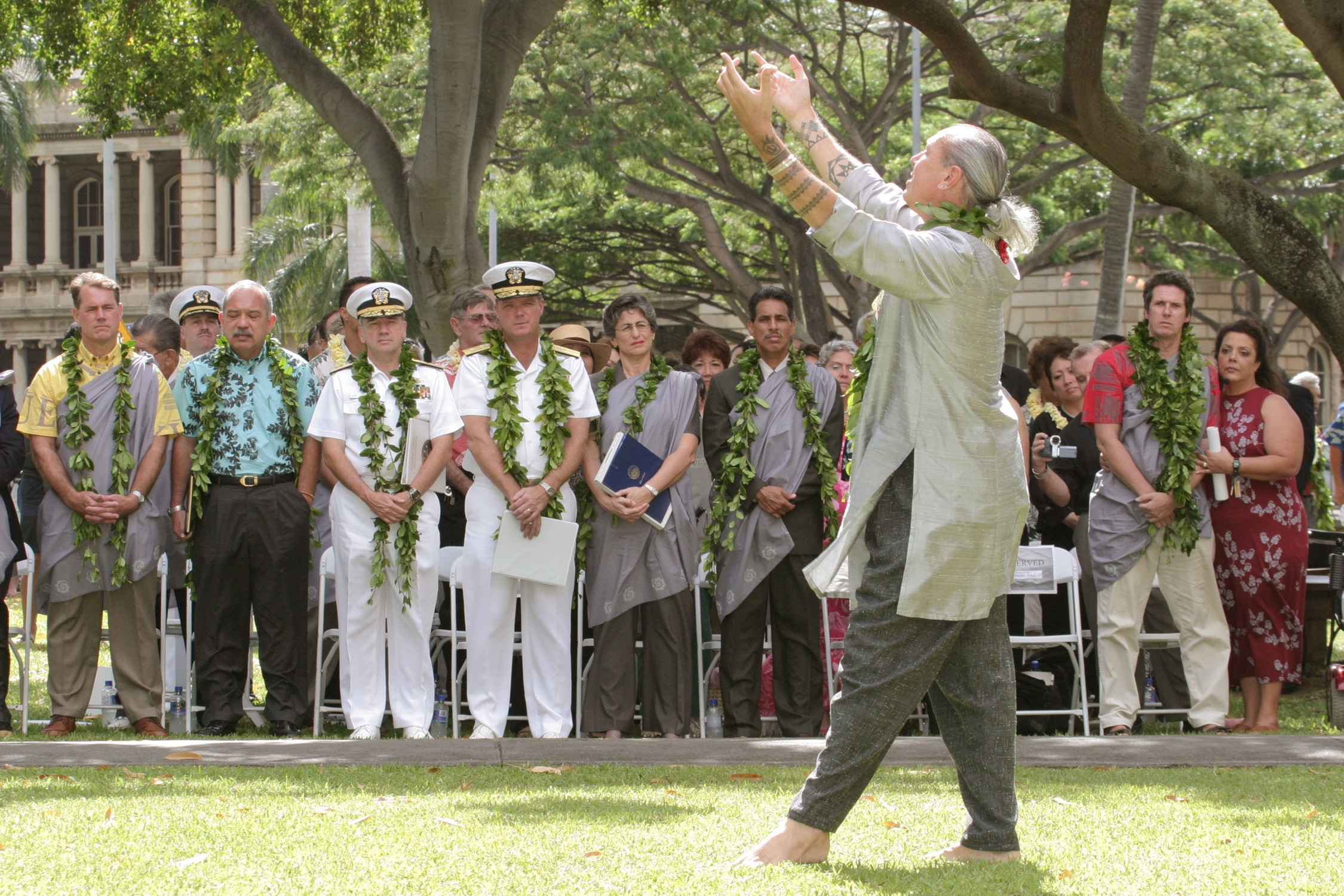
Hula performance at a ceremony depicting the turning over U.S. Navy control over the island of Kahoʻolawe to the state performed by Uncle Frank Kawaikapuokalani Hewett

The chant (mele) is typically accompanied by an ipu heke (a double gourd) and/or pahu (sharkskin covered drum). Some dances require dancers to utilize hula implements such as an ipu (single gourd), ʻiliʻili (waterworn lava stone castanets),ʻuliʻuli (feathered gourd rattles), pu`ʻili (split bamboo sticks), or kalaʻau (rhythm sticks). The older, formal kind of hula is called kahiko, while the modern version is ʻauana. There are also religious chants called ʻoli; when accompanied by dancing and drums, it is called mele hula pahu.

In the pre-contact Hawaiian language, the word mele referred to any kind of poetic expression, though it now translates as song. The two kinds of Hawaiian chanting were mele oli and mele hula. The first were a cappella individual songs, while the latter were accompanied dance music performed by a group. The chanters were known as haku mele and were highly trained composers and performers. Some kinds of chants express emotions like angst and affection, or request a favor from another person. Other chants are for specific purposes like naming, (mele inoa), prayer (mele pule), surfing (mele he'e nalu), and genealogical recitations (mele koihonua). Mele chants were governed by strict rules, and were performed in a number of styles include the rapid kepakepa and the enunciate koihonua.

== Music history ==
Historical documentation of Hawaiian music does not extend prior to the late 18th century, when non-Hawaiians (haoles) arrived on the island. From 1778 onward, Hawaii began a period of acculturation with the introduction of numerous styles of European music, including the hymns (himeni) introduced by Protestant missionary choirs. Spanish-speaking Mexican cowboys (paniolos), were particularly influential immigrants in the field of music, introducing string instruments such as the guitar and possibly also the technique of falsetto singing, while Portuguese immigrants brought the ukulele-like braguinha. Also immigrants from all over the world had brought their own instruments along with them to the islands.

Elizabeth Tatar divided Hawaiian music history into seven periods, beginning with the initial arrival of Europeans and their musical cultures, spanning approximately from 1820 to 1872. The subsequent period lasted to the beginning of the 20th century, and was marked by the creation of an acculturated yet characteristically Hawaiian modern style, while European instruments spread across the islands. Tatar's third period, from 1900 to about 1915, saw the integration of Hawaiian music into the broader field of American popular music, with the invention of hapa haole songs, which use the English language and only superficial elements of Hawaiian music; the beginning of the Hawaiian recording industry was in 1906, when the Victor Talking Machine Company made the first 53 recordings in the territory. By 1912, recorded Hawaiian music had found an audience on the American mainland. Puerto Rican immigration to Hawaii began when Puerto Rico's sugar industry was devastated by two hurricanes in 1899. The devastation caused a worldwide shortage in sugar and a huge demand for the product from Hawaii. Hawaiian sugarcane plantation owners began to recruit the jobless, but experienced, laborers in Puerto Rico. They took with them their music and in the early 1900s introduced what is known as Cachi Cachi music, on the islands of Hawaii.

From 1915 to 1930, mainstream audiences outside of Hawaii became increasingly enamored of Hawaiian music, though by this time the songs marketed as Hawaiian had only peripheral aspects of actual Hawaiian music. Tahitian and Samoan music had an influence on Hawaiian music during this period, especially in their swifter and more intricate rhythms. The following era, from about 1930 to 1960, has been called the "Golden Age of Hawaiian music". National radio host Webley Edwards, broadcasting from Honolulu, first introduced most Americans to authentic and adapted for orchestra and big band styles through his popular hour-long radio show Hawaii Calls. Hawaiian performers like Lani McIntire, John Kameaaloha Almeida and Sol Hoʻopiʻi became mainstream stars as regulars on the show and through live performances. In the 1960s, Hawaiian-style music declined in popularity amid an influx of rock, soul and pop acts from the American mainland. This trend reversed itself in the final period of Hawaiian music history, the modern period beginning with the Hawaiian Renaissance in the 1970s and continuing with the foundation of a variety of modern music scenes in fields like indie rock, Hawaiian Rap (Na mele paleoleo) and Jawaiian.

=== Liliʻuokalani and Henri Berger ===
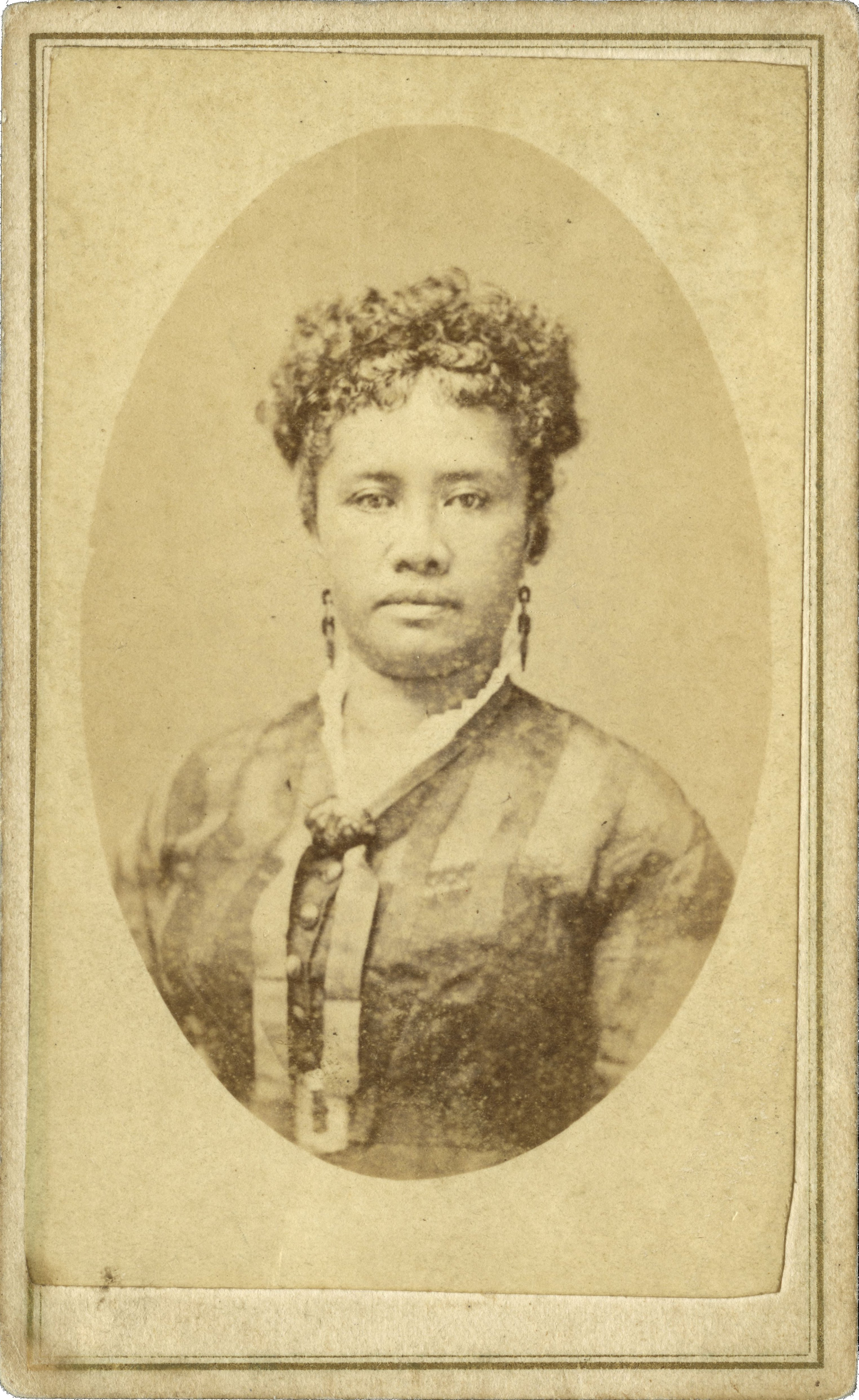
Lili'uokalani

Queen Liliʻuokalani was the last Queen of Hawaii before the Hawaiian monarchy was overthrown. She was also a musician and prolific composer who wrote many musical works. She was best known for Aloha 'Oe. A compilation of her works, titled "The Queen's Songbook", was published in 1999 by The Queen Lili'uokalani Trust.

Aloha'oe performed by Madam Alapai in 1911

Lili'uokalani was one of many members of the Hawaiian royal family with musical inclinations. They studied under a Prussian military bandleader, Henri Berger, who was sent by the Kaiser at the request of Kamehameha V. Berger became fascinated by Hawaiian folk music, and wrote much documentation on it. However, he also brought his own musical background in German music, and heavily guided the Hawaiian musicians and composers he worked with.

King Kamehameha V also, in 1847, sent to Germany for a "band Leader" for "The Kings Own Band", now the Royal Hawaiian Band, William Mersberg, from Weimar, Germany. He is Henry Kaleialoha Allen's great grandfather. Henry Kaleialoha Allen is "one of Hawaii's Living Treasures of Hawaiian Music" and a master music educator and has been honored many times on the Senate Floor and by the Legislature for such.

=== Guitar innovations ===
Guitars could have come to Hawaii from several sources: sailors, missionaries, or travelers to and from California. The most frequently told story is that it accompanied the Mexican cowboys (vaqueros) brought by King Kamehameha III in 1832 in order to teach the natives how to control an overpopulation of cattle. The Hawaiian cowboys (paniolo) used guitars in their traditional folk music. The Portuguese introduced an instrument called the braguinha, a small, four-stringed Madeira variant of the cavaquinho; this instrument was a precursor to the `ukulele.

Steel-string guitars also arrived with the Portuguese in the 1860s and slack-key had spread across the chain by the late 1880s. A ship called the Ravenscrag arrived in Honolulu on August 23, 1879, bringing Portuguese field workers from Madeira. Legend has it that one of the men, João Fernandes, later a popular musician, tried to impress the Hawaiians by playing folk music with a friend's braguinha; it is also said that the Hawaiians called the instrument `ukulele (jumping flea) in reference to the man's swift fingers. Others have claimed the word means gift that came here or a corruption of ukeke lele (dancing ukeke, a three-string bow).

The popularity throughout the 1920s of Hawaiian music, with its unique slide-style of guitar playing, prompted the invention of the electric guitar in 1931, as a lap steel guitar, the "frying pan", by George Beauchamp. Electric amplification allowed the Hawaiian-style guitar to be heard in performances of larger popular bands.

=== Late 19th and early 20th century ===
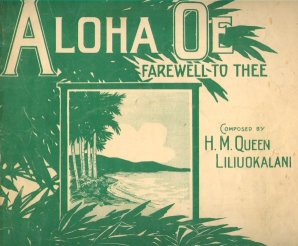
1913 sheet music cover

In the 1880s and 90s, King David Kalakaua promoted Hawaiian culture and also encouraged the addition of new instruments, such as the ukulele and possibly steel guitar; Kalakaua died in 1891, and so it is highly unlikely he would have heard it. Kalakaua's successor, his sister Lili'uokalani, was also a prolific composer and wrote several songs, like "Aloha 'Oe", which remain popular. During this period, Hawaiian music evolved into a "new distinctive" style, using the derivatives of European instruments; aside from the widespread string instruments, brass bands like the Royal Hawaiian Band performed Hawaiian songs as well as popular marches and ragtimes.

In about 1889, Joseph Kekuku began sliding a piece of steel across the strings of a guitar, thus inventing steel guitar (kika kila); at about the same time, traditional Hawaiian music with English lyrics became popular. Vocals predominated in Hawaiian music until the 20th century, when instrumentation took a lead role. Much of modern slack-key guitar has become entirely instrumental.

From about 1895 to 1915, Hawaiian music dance bands became in demand more and more. These were typically string quintets. Ragtime music influenced the music, and English words were commonly used in the lyrics. This type of Hawaiian music, influenced by popular music and with lyrics being a combination of English and Hawaiian (or wholly English), is called hapa haole (literally: half white) music. In 1903, Albert "Sonny" Cunha composed My Waikiki Mermaid, arguably the first popular hapa haole song (The earliest known hapa haole song, "Eating of the Poi", was published in Ka Buke o na Leo Mele Hawaii...o na Home Hawaii in Honolulu in 1888 [See Kanahele, George S., Hawaiian Music and Musicians pages 71–72]).

In 1927, Rose Moe (1908–1999), a Hawaiian singer, with her husband Tau Moe (1908–2004), a Samoan guitarist, began touring with Madame Riviere's Hawaiians. In 1929 they recorded eight songs in Tokyo. Rose and Tau continued touring for over fifty years, living in countries such as Germany, Lebanon and India. They even performed in Germany as late as 1938 when the Nazi racism was on the rise and people of a darker color were regarded as inferior people; it is said that they even performed for Adolf Hitler himself. With their children, the Tau Moe family did much to spread the sound of Hawaiian folk music and hapa haole music throughout the world. In 1988, the Tau Moe family re-recorded the 1929 sessions with the help of musician and ethnomusicologist Bob Brozman.

The 1920s also saw the development of a uniquely Hawaiian style of jazz, innovated by performers at the Moana and Royal Hawaiian Hotels.

==== Slack key guitar ====
Slack-key guitar (kī ho`alu in Hawaiian) is a fingerpicked playing style, named for the fact that the strings are most often "slacked" or loosened to create an open (unfingered) chord, either a major chord (the most common is G, which is called "taro patch" tuning) or a major 7th (called a "wahine" tuning). A tuning might be invented to play a particular song or facilitate a particular effect, and as late as the 1960s they were often treated as family secrets and passed from generation to generation. By the time of the Hawaiian Renaissance, though, the example of players such as Auntie Alice Namakelua, Leonard Kwan, Raymond Kane, and Keola Beamer had encouraged the sharing of the tunings and techniques and probably saved the style from extinction. Playing techniques include "hammering-on", "pulling-off", "chimes" (harmonics), and "slides," and these effects frequently mimic the falsettos and vocal breaks common in Hawaiian singing.

The guitar entered Hawaiian culture from a number of directions—sailors, settlers, and contract workers. One important source of the style was Mexican cowboys hired to work on the Big Island of Hawaiʻi in the first half of the 19th century. These paniolo brought their guitars and their music, and when they left, the Hawaiians developed their own style of playing the instrument.

Slack key guitar evolved to accompany the rhythms of Hawaiian dancing and the melodies of Hawaiian chant. Hawaiian music in general, which was promoted under the reign of King David Kalakaua as a matter of national pride and cultural revival, drew rhythms from traditional Hawaiian beats and European military marches, and drew its melodies from Christian hymns and the cosmopolitan peoples of the islands (although principally American).

==== Popularization ====
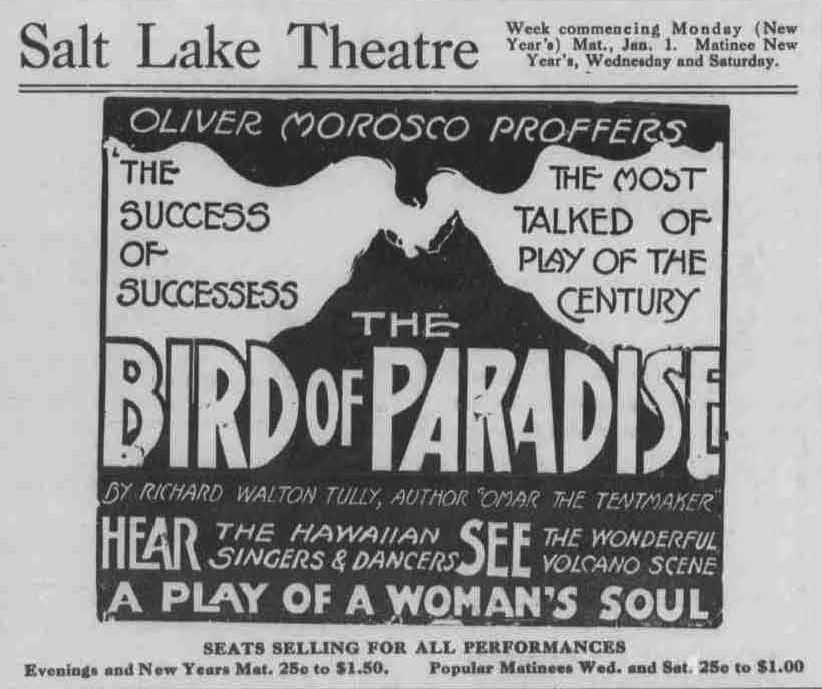
An advertisement for the Broadway show The Bird of Paradise

In the early 20th century Hawaiians began touring the United States, often in small bands. A Broadway show called Bird of Paradise introduced Hawaiian music to many Americans in 1912 and the Panama–Pacific International Exposition in San Francisco followed in 1915; one year later, recordings of indigenous Hawaiian music outsold all other U.S. musical genres.

The increasing popularization of Hawaiian music influenced blues and country musicians; this connection can still be heard in modern country. In reverse, musicians like Bennie Nawahi began incorporating jazz into his steel guitar, ukulele, and mandolin music, while the Kalama Quartet introduced a style of group falsetto singing.

The musician Sol Hoʻopiʻi arose during this time, playing both Hawaiian music and jazz, Western swing and country, and developing the pedal steel guitar; his recordings helped establish the Nashville sound of popular country music. Lani McIntire was another musician who infused a Hawaiian guitar sound into mainstream American popular music through his recordings with Jimmie Rodgers and Bing Crosby.

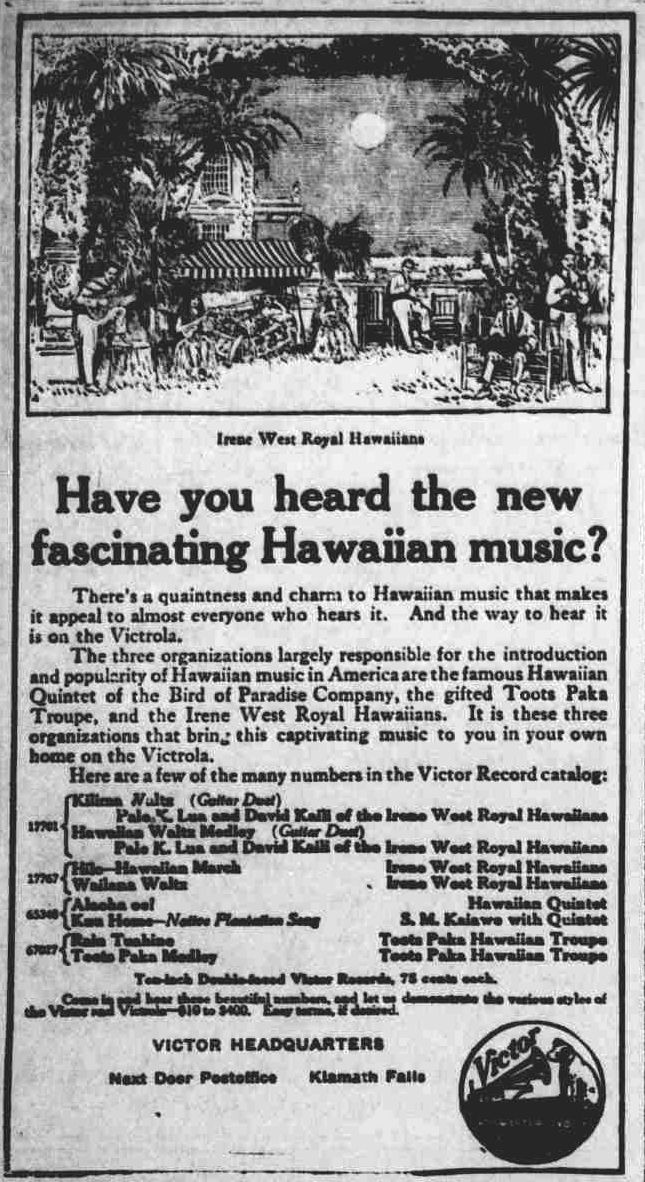
A 1916 advertisement for Hawaiian music records from Victor Records

In the 1920s and 30s, Hawaiian music became an integral part of local tourism, with most hotels and attractions incorporating music in one form or another. Among the earliest and most popular musical attractions was the Kodak Hula Show, sponsored by Kodak, in which a tourist purchased Kodak film and took photographs of dancers and musicians. The show ran from 1937 through 2002. Several vinyl LPs featuring music from the Kodak Hula Show were released by Waikiki Records, with full color photographs of the show's performers.

In the first half of the 20th century, the mostly young men who hung around the Honolulu beaches, swimming and surfing, came to be known as the Waikiki Beachboys and their parties became famous across Hawaii and abroad; most of them played the ukulele all day long, sitting on the beach, and eventually began working for hotels to entertain tourists.

Popular Hawaiian music with English verse (hapa haole) can be described in a narrow sense. Generally, songs are sung to the ukulele or steel guitar. A steel string guitar sometimes accompanies. Melodies often feature an intervallic leap, such as a perfect fourth or octave. Falsetto vocals are suited for such leaps and are common in Hawaiian singing, as is the use of microtones. Rhythm is mostly in duple meter. A musical scale that is unique to Hawaiian music imbues it with its distinct feel, and so is aptly named the Hawaiian scale.

The Panama-Pacific Exposition in San Francisco in 1915 introduced Hawaiian steel guitar to mainland country music artists, and by the 1930s country stars Hoot Gibson and Jimmy Davis were making records with Hawaiian musicians.

The influx of thousands of American servicemen into Hawaii during World War II created a demand for both popular swing rhythm and country sounds. The western swing style, popular on the mainland since the 1930s, employed the steel guitar as a key element and was therefore a natural evolution. Beginning in 1945, the Bell Record Company of Honolulu responded to the demand with a series of releases by the western swing band Fiddling Sam and his Hawaiian Buckaroos (led by fiddler Homer H. Spivey, and including Lloyd C. Moore, Tiny Barton, Al Hittle, Calvert Duke, Tolbert E. Stinnett, and Raymond "Blackie" Barnes). Between 1945 and 1950 Bell released some 40 sides by the Hawaiian Buckaroos, including a set of square dance numbers.

=== Kamehameha Schools Song Contest ===
The Kamehameha Schools Song Contest, a well-known tradition within Hawaiʻi, is held by Kamehameha Schools Kapālama annually in the Spring, typically mid-March, at the Neal Blaisdell Center. It is a musical competition between high school classes and every year, during the third semester, students prepare and rehearse to perform these different a cappella choral arrangements of mele (Hawaiian songs) as a class. Every year the theme changes, for example, in 2023 the theme was Na Mele Paniolo, songs and Hoʻike (half-time hula and music exhibition) were about the songs of the Hawaiian cowboy. According to the Director of Music at Kamehameha from 1926-1947, Miss Laura Brown, "the objectives of the song contest are to build up the repertoire of the best in Hawaiian music for the cultural heritage of any student who attends Kamehameha; to develop leadership, cooperation and good class spirit; and to give students the use of their singing voices and to give them pleasure in singing as a means of expression". Song contest is a way to celebrate and showcase Hawaiian music and Hawaiian culture with people from all around the world.

The entire program length is around two-two and a half hours, and consists of the oli hoʻokipa (opening chant), pule (prayer), singing Hoʻonani Ka Makua Mau (Doxology), singing Hawaiʻi Ponoʻi (The Hawaiʻi National Anthem), the main program with 10 songs sung by classes singing their co-ed, men, and women songs, Hōʻike (hula half-time exhibition performance), results and awards being presented (Ka Hāʻawi Makana), and ending with the alma mater (Sonʻs of Hawaiʻi).

Kamehameha Schools Song Contest is also very famous for the intermission Hōʻike performance. It is a half-time performance celebrating Hawaiian music and hula, and relates to the theme for that year. The performance also features live Hawaiian music, props, and many special guests, narration from students, and hula ʻauana (modern-style hula) and hula kahiko (traditional-style hula).

== Modern music ==
In recent decades, traditional Hawaiian music has undergone a renaissance, with renewed interest from both ethnic Hawaiians and others. The islands have also produced a number of well-regarded rock, pop, hip hop (na mele paleoleo), dubstep, soul, and reggae performers, and many local musicians in the clubs of Waikiki and Honolulu play outside the various "Hawaiian" genres. Hawaii has its own regional music industry, with several distinctive styles of recorded popular music. Hawaiian popular music is largely based on American popular music, but does have distinctive retentions from traditional Hawaiian music.

=== Hawaiian Renaissance ===
The Hawaiian Renaissance was a resurgence in interest in Hawaiian music, especially slack-key, among ethnic Hawaiians. Long-standing performers like Gabby Pahinui found their careers revitalized; Pahinui, who had begun recording in 1947, finally reached mainstream audiences across the United States when sessions on which Ry Cooder played with him and his family were released as The Gabby Pahinui Hawaiian Band, Volume 1 on a major mainland label. Pahinui inspired a legion of followers who played a mix of slack-key, reggae, country, rock, and other styles. The more traditional players included Leland "Atta" Isaacs, Sr., Sonny Chillingworth, Ray Kane, Leonard Kwan, Ledward Ka`apana, Dennis Pavao, while Keola Beamer, and Peter Moon have been more eclectic in their approach. The Emerson brothers rekindled the classic sound of Sol Ho'opi'i with the National steel guitar on their vintage 1920s stylings. George Kanahele's Hawaiian National Music Foundation did much to spread slack-key and other forms of Hawaiian music, especially after a major 1972 concert.

Don Ho (1930–2007), originally from the small Honolulu neighborhood of Kaka'ako, was the most widely known Hawaiian entertainer of the last decades of the 20th century. Although he did not play "traditional" Hawaiian music, Ho became an unofficial ambassador of Hawaiian culture throughout the world as well as on the American mainland. Ho's style often combined traditional Hawaiian elements and older 1950s and 1960s-style crooner music with an easy listening touch.

Loyal Garner also embraced Hawaiian elements in her Vegas-style lounge act and in the songs she recorded. A third notable performer, Myra English, became known as the "Champagne Lady" after recording the song "Drinking Champagne" by Bill Mack in 1963 became her signature song in Hawaii, and she achieved considerable commercial success both locally and abroad.

=== Jawaiian ===
Jawaiian is a Hawaiian style of reggae music. Reggae music is a genre that evolved in the late 1960s and earlier in Jamaica. It has become popular across the world, especially among ethnic groups and races that have been historically oppressed, such as Native Americans, Pacific Islanders, and Australian Aborigines. In Hawaii, ethnic Hawaiians and others in the state began playing a mixture of reggae and local music in the early 1980s, although it was not until the late 1980s that it became recognized as a new genre in local music. The band Simplisity has been credited by Quiet Storm Records as originators of the Jawaiian style, while other influences include Walter Aipolani, known as the Father of Hawaiian Reggae. By the end of the 1980s, Jawaiian came to dominate the local music scene, as well as spawning a backlash that the Honolulu Star-Bulletin compared to the "disco sucks" movement of the late 1970s.

Reggae culture as a whole began to dominate Hawaii, as many locals can be seen sporting Bob Marley memorabilia, and much local merchandise and souvenirs have been emblazoned with the red, yellow, and green colors of the Hawaiian sovereignty as well as the Lion of Judah flag, a known symbol of the Rastafari movement. The Rasta colors have also become a symbol of local pride.

=== Rock and roll ===
Rock and roll music has long been popular in Hawaii - numerous rock and roll artists spent their developmental years in Hawaii (i.e. members of The Association, The Electric Prunes, 7th Order, Vicious Rumors, as well as guitarists Marty Friedman and Charlie "Icarus" Johnson), and its local popularity dates back to the earliest days of rock music. Elvis Presley's career included several Hawaii-related performances and records: a March 1961 live performance to raise money for the construction of the USS Arizona Memorial at the Pearl Harbor Bloch Arena in March 1961, his Aloha from Hawaii Via Satellite "comeback" record and concert in 1973, and three of his movies were based in Hawaii (Blue Hawaii, Girls! Girls! Girls!, and Paradise, Hawaiian Style).

Through the 1960s and 1970s, rock concerts were frequently held at venues like the Honolulu International Center and The Waikiki Shell by artists like Jimi Hendrix, Led Zeppelin, The Rolling Stones, The Doors, Eric Clapton, Deep Purple, Jeff Beck, and many other top rock artists.

The three-day-long Crater Festivals (held over the New Years and July 4 holidays) at Diamond Head in the 1960s and 1970s were well attended through the era, and frequently featured popular bands like Fleetwood Mac, Journey and Santana (Carlos Santana and Buddy Miles actually released their 1972 Crater Festival performance on the LP Carlos Santana & Buddy Miles! Live!).

=== Jazz ===
==== Musicians ====
Some notable current and retired jazz musicians in Hawaii include Gabe Baltazar (saxophone), Martin Denny (piano), Arthur Lyman (vibraphone and marimba), Henry Allen (guitar), vonBaron (drums), David Choy (saxophone), Rich Crandall (piano), Dan Del Negro (keyboards), Pierre Grill (piano/keyboards/trombone), Bruce Hamada (bass), DeShannon Higa (trumpet), Jim Howard (piano), Steve Jones (bass), John Kolivas (bass), Noel Okimoto (drums/percussion/vibes), Michael Paulo (reeds), Rene Paulo (acoustic grand piano) was a forerunner of recording Hawaiian music in the jazz venue in the early 1960s and is one of Hawaii's legendary music greats, Robert Shinoda (guitar), Arex Ikehara (bass), Phil Bennett (drums), Aron Nelson (piano), Tennyson Stephens (piano), Dean Taba (bass), Betty Loo Taylor (piano), Tim Tsukiyama (saxophone), Reggie Padilla (saxophone), and Abe Lagrimas Jr. (drums/ukulele/vibes).

Notable jazz vocalists in Hawaii, both current and retired include Jimmy Borges, Rachel Gonzales, Azure McCall, Dana Land, Joy Woode, and I. Mihana Souza. Although Hawaiian vocalist Melveen Leed is known primarily for singing Hawaiian and "Hawaiian country" music, she has also earned good reviews as a jazz singer.

There are frequent performances by the University of Hawaiʻi jazz bands.

=== Ukulele ===
The ukulele was introduced to Hawaii by Madeiran immigrants near the close of the 19th century. Portuguese immigrants traveled to the Hawaiian Islands and brought parts of their culture with them, including a small guitar-like instrument, known as the braguinha in Portugal today, and also "machete de braga" (small guitar from Braga). The pioneers of the ukulele were Augusto Dias, Manuel Nunes, and José do Espírito Santo. They were aboard the Ravenscrag ship under a contract to help out with labor upon the sugar plantations spread throughout the Hawaiian Islands at the time. However, growing up in Madeira, they were trained as cabinet workers and soon opened up their own company and guitar shop around 1884–1885.

With Madeira being far in location, they soon began using local resources including the Hawaiian wood, Koa, to create their instruments. Koa wood is one of the higher-quality woods which creates a deep and also clear sound for the ukulele. This makes Koa ukuleles very distinguishable by sound. Because of this, koa wood is known as a revered wood to create an ukulele. Not only are koa ukuleles distinguishable by sound but also by looks. They have a unique grain pattern and color that allows them to stand out more than the average wood.

The instrument became very popular in Hawaiian culture as it was the first introduction to a melodic instrument. A majority of Hawaiian songs involve the ukulele and many have begun playing the instrument from around the world. In Hawaiian, ukulele literally means "flea (uku) jumping (lele)." It was named in reference to the movement of players' fingers, acting as fleas jumping to and from different frets and strings. There are currently four sizes of ukulele; soprano, concert, tenor, and baritone.

Queen Liliʻuokalani, the last Hawaiian Queen, believed that the name for the ukulele means "The gift that came here". She believed this because of the Hawaiian words "uku" which means "gift or reward" and "lele" which means "to come." The instrument was very popular among the Royal Hawaiian family, with Queen Liliʻuokalani, King Kalākaua, and Princess Kaʻiulani being some of the members who played the instrument. Also with Koa being closely related and representative of the Royal Hawaiian Family, and Koa being what ukuleles are made of, Ukulele was highly valued within Hawaiian culture and practices as it also carried the imprint and association with the Royal Family. It is also known that King Kalākaua was an integral part of popularizing the instrument. He was known for composing and playing his ʻukulele, which made it grow in popularity and became almost a trend in those days. It was also seen to be a perfect accompaniment to hula and chanting that percussion implements could not perform.

The instrument came at a time of great turmoil for Native Hawaiians. With the overthrow of the Hawaiian Kingdom and an installed provisional government, the instrument was a valuable instrument used for protesting; a famous example is Kaulana Nā Pua (Famous are the Flowers) by Ellen Kehoʻohiwaokalani Wright Prendergast. There is also not only great versatility within the instrument itself but it also is an authentic representation of the Hawaiian people in terms of music written.

The ukulele can be played with simple or elaborate strums, as well as fingerpicking.

=== ‘Ūkēkē ===
The Ukeke is a Hawaiian musical bow played with the mouth. It is the only stringed instrument indigenous to Hawaii.

=== 'Ohe hano ihu ===
The 'ohe hano ihu, (Hawaiian: `ohe = bamboo +hano = breath + ihu = nose) or Traditional Hawaiian Nose Flute in English, is another type of Hawaiian instrument that has cultural and musical importance. It is made from a single bamboo section. According to Arts and Crafts of Hawai`i by Te Rangi Hiroa, old flutes in the Bishop Museum collection have a hole at the node area for the breath, and two or three fingering holes. In the three-finger-hole specimen, one fingering hole is placed near the breath hole. Lengths range from 10 to 21 inches (250–530 mm). Oral tradition in various families states that numbers of fingering holes ranged from one to four, and location of the holes varied depending on the musical taste of the player.

Though primarily a courting instrument played privately and for personal enjoyment, it also could be used in conjunction with chants, song, and hula. Kumu hula (dance masters), were said to be able to either make the flute sound as though it were chanting, or to chant as they played. Kumu hula Leilehua Yuen is one of the few contemporary Hawaiian musicians to perform with the nose flute in this manner.

Into the 19th and early 20th centuries, young men still used the 'ohe hano ihu as a way to win the affection and love of a woman. Today, the `ohe hano ihu is enjoying a resurgence of popularity.

Two different oral traditions explain the use of the nose for playing the `ohe hano ihu. According to one, the `ohe hano ihu is played with air from the nose rather than from the mouth because a person's hā, breath, is expressive of the person's inner being. As the hā travels from the na`ao, or gut, through the mouth, the hā can be used to lie. When the hā travels through the nose, it cannot lie. Therefore, if a young man loves a woman, that love will be expressed in the music he plays with his `ohe hano ihu. According to the other tradition, the instrument is played with the nose to enable the player to softly sing or chant while playing.

Modern folklore says that the Hawaiian flute expresses "aloha" because to hear the flute one must come close to the alo, "face" or "presence" of the player to hear the hā, "divine breath" and so the listener experiences "being in one another's presence sharing the divine breath." While useful as a way to remember the contemplative and personal nature of the traditional Hawaiian flute, there is no actual etymological evidence, nor is there evidence in traditional chants or stories, to support this etymology. In the Hawaiian language, hā, breath, is unrelated to the word ha, a causative prefix. a search of cognate words in related languages also reveals no such etymologies for the word "aloha".

According to the book `Ohe, by Leilehua Yuen, the instrument was popularized in the 1970s by members of the Beamer family who played it during performances on tour in North America, as well as in the Hawaiian Islands. Segments of the children's educational TV show, Sesame Street, showing Keola Beamer and Mr. Snuffalupagus, one of the large puppet characters, playing `ohe hano ihu brought the instrument to national attention. Winona Beamer, Keola Beamer's mother, a noted kumu hula, also taught the use of the `ohe hano ihu in hula. Her hānai daughter, Maile Beamer Loo, continues to preserve and teach that legacy, and document such important aspects of Hawaiian musical and performing heritage through the Hula Preservation Society.

Notable late 20th Century and early 21st Century musicians of the`ohe hano ihu include Mahi Beamer, Nona Beamer, Keola Beamer, Kapono Beamer, Calvin Hoe, Nelson Kaai, Anthony Natividad, and Manu Josiah.

=== Other ===
- Bruno Mars from Honolulu has 8 #1 Billboard Hot 100 hits, including "Uptown Funk" in 2015.
- Glenn Medeiros had a #1 Hot 100 hit in 1990 with "She Ain't Worth It" ft. Bobby Brown.
- Bette Midler, also from Honolulu, had a #1 Hot 100 hit with "Wind Beneath My Wings" in 1989.
- Megan Skiendiel, also from Honolulu, is a member of girl group Katseye.
- Tane Cain, who was raised in Hawaii, had a #37 Hot 100 hit with "Holdin' On" in 1982.
- Yvonne Elliman, from Honolulu, had a #1 Hot 100 hit with the disco song "If I Can't Have You" from Saturday Night Fever in 1978.

== See also ==
- Cachi Cachi music
- Hawaii Calls
- Hawaiian Music Hall of Fame
- Kanikapila
- Na Hoku Hanohano Awards
