= Irie Love =

American singer

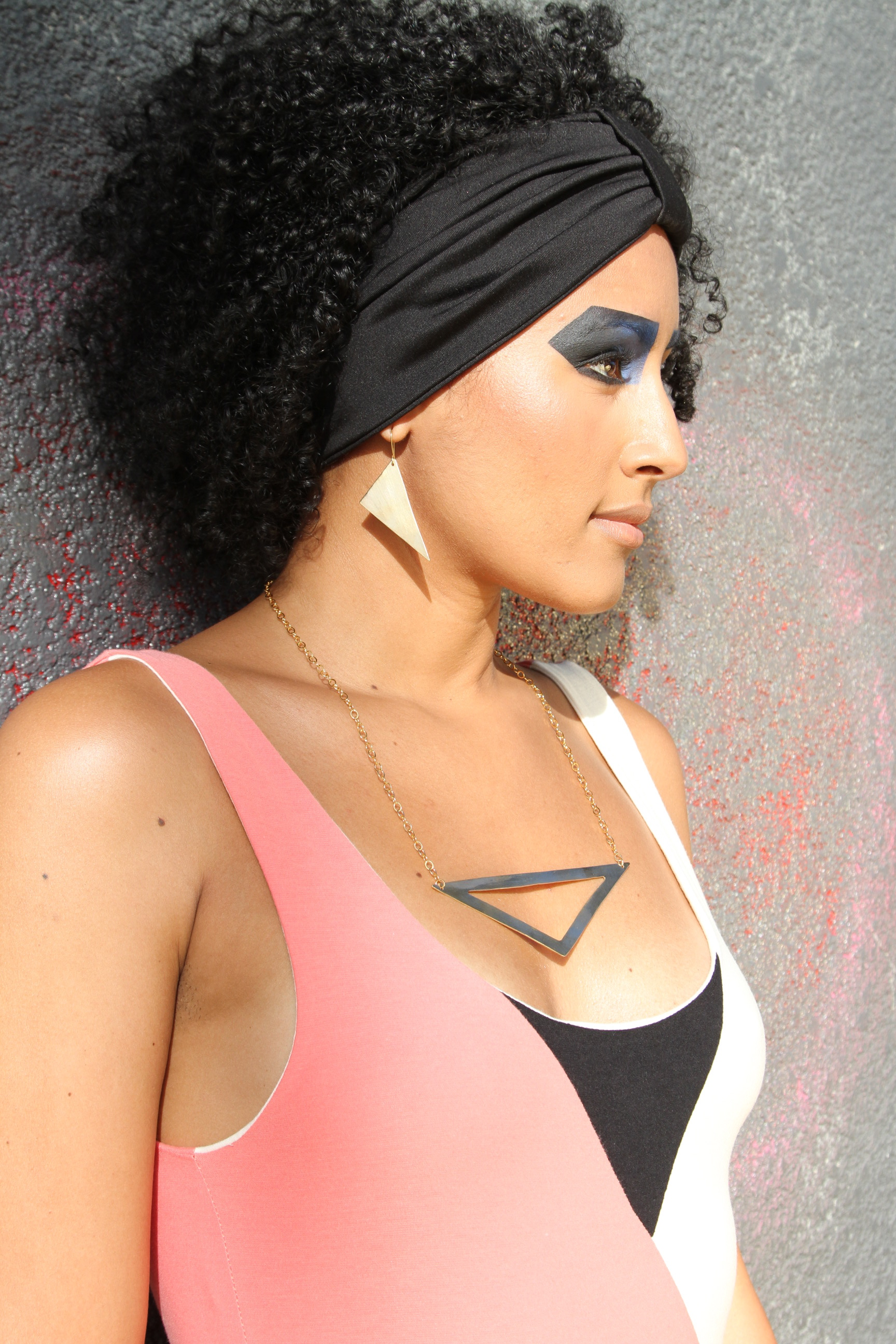

Background information
- Born: Irie Love Taylor; July 7, 1982 (age 44); Kailua, Honolulu County, Hawaii, United States
- Genres: Reggae, R&B
- Occupations: Singer, Songwriter
- Years active: 1999–present
- Labels: Quiet Storm Records, Gedion Music, World Sound
- Website: www.thisisirielove.com

Irie Love Taylor (born July 7, 1982) is an American R&B Reggae singer and songwriter. She first gained notice as one of the finalists on the "Brown Bags to Stardom" competition in Honolulu, Hawaii in 1999. She was signed by John Iervolino (one of the judges in the competition) onto his record label, Quiet Storm Records. She was featured as the only new artist on his world music compilation entitled Roots Music Volume 2: Private Beach Party for which they used her likeness to promote the album.

== Early life ==
Love is of Hawaiian, Jamaican, Dutch, English, and Native American descent. Her father is a former NFL linebacker and she is a descendant of Robert Love who founded Love's Bakery in Hawaii. In 2000, she moved to Los Angeles, California to study Music and Business at Azusa Pacific University.

== Career ==
In 2002, Love booked a tour as a back-up singer for the artist Pink. She continued as a back-up singer for the next three years singing for such artists as Dave Hollister and Chaka Khan. In 2006, she moved to Kingston, Jamaica to pursue a solo career in reggae music. She became one of the twelve finalists in the Irie FM Red Stripe Big Break Competition.

Love was introduced to the reggae group Morgan Heritage at the East Fest in St. Thomas, Jamaica in December 2006. In April 2007, Morgan Heritage signed Irie Love to their production company Gedion Music. She immediately began touring the world as their opening act alongside their younger brother Laza. She also sang backup for Morgan Heritage touring the United States, the Caribbean, South America, Africa, Europe and the UK. In October 2008, Love released her first EP entitled Ehiku; on October 18, 2008, and threw a launch party for the EP in Waikiki, Hawaii. In January 2009, she released her 1st international album in Japan entitled "The Life of Love". Irie Love has also been featured on several compilation albums such as The Biggest Reggae One-Drop Anthems 2008 and Coconut Island Vol.1 and Unseen Famili Compilation Vol.1, all of which are available on iTunes.

Love performed and recorded with her mentors Salaam Remi, Lee Francis, George 'Fiji' Veikoso and several other producers for her Hawaiian Reggae album for 2012. Her singles ʻIt Is Wut It Isʻ featuring Fiji and ʻMy Loveʻ, produced by Lee Francis both charted at No. 1 on the Hawaiian Reggae Charts. The single ʻIt Is Wut It Isʻ featuring 'Fiji' was also featured on Hawaiian Airlines inflight entertainment.
