= Carole Kai =

American musician

Carole Kai (née Shimizu; born October 28, 1944) is an entertainer (singer and pianist), recording artist, and philanthropist from Hawaii.

== Personal life ==
Born Carole Shimizu in Honolulu, she graduated from McKinley High School in Honolulu. She also attended University of Hawaiʻi at Mānoa.

She began performing shortly after she graduated; she also recorded for several local record labels. Her first album, "All at once..." (Kanaka KM-1002), was produced by island record industry veteran George J.D. Chun. At that time she was billed as Carol Kai.

== Career ==
In the late 1970s, when she was already well known as a Hawaii showroom headliner, her manager, Yemun Chung, paired her with a young island show band he was also managing, The Fabulous Krush (later known simply as "The Krush"). Kai was not a member of the group; they performed as her backing band as well as doing their own shows.

In the late 1990s, following the national success of shows featuring two or more "divas", she joined three other local singers with showroom experience — Loyal Garner, Melveen Leed, and Nohelani "Baby Diva" Cypriano — to form a new show group named The Local Divas. The group made several recordings but broke up after Garner's death several years later.

Kai was also the co-host, with Kimo Kahoano, of a televised karaoke contest, Hawaii Stars, that was the most popular locally produced show of its kind in Hawaii.

Kai appeared in Hawaii Five-0 (1968 TV series) season 3 episode 7 "Force of Waves" as a nurse, in a small role.

Kai also appeared in Hawaii Five-0 season 5 episode 21 "Percentage", as Valerie Sinclair, the cheating wife of a rich, older man.

== Philanthropy ==
Kai was the organizer and namesake of the first bed race in Hawaii, the Carole Kai Bed Race (later the Honolulu International Bed Race).

It became an annual event benefiting the Variety Schools, a local school for children with special needs. Later, in 1985, after ending her affiliation with the bed race, she partnered with local cardiologist Jack Scaff to organize a road race between Aloha Tower in downtown Honolulu and Aloha Stadium. This race became the Great Aloha Run, and is now one of the largest road races in Hawaii, perhaps second to the Honolulu Marathon, attracting about 20,000 runners annually.
