= Double road race =

Long-distance road running competition consisting of two segments or "legs" – a

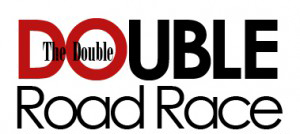
- Event type: Road
- Distance: 10k + 5k
- Established: 2012
- Website: Double Road Race

The Double Road Race is a long-distance road running competition consisting of two segments or "legs" – a 10-kilometer road run, followed by a five-kilometer road run, with a short rest break in between. The Double Road Race Federation added additional distances in August 2014. Other official distances for Double Racing® include Double 5k (3+2), Double 8k (5+3), and Double 21k (15+6). The race was created by Runner's World magazine founder Bob Anderson.

== History ==
The first Double Road Race was held at Pleasanton, California on Dec 23, 2012 and drew 1400 runners.

In 2013, Double Road Race events were held in San Jose, Pleasanton and San Juan Bautista, California; Overland Park and Manhattan, Kansas; Denver, Colorado; and Indianapolis, Indiana.

Organizers announced plans to hold Double Road Races during 2014 in San Jose on February 22, 2014, in Pacific Grove, California on May 11, 2014 and in San Juan Bautista on September 20, 2014; Ft. Lauderdale, Florida on May 18, 2014; Indianapolis, Indiana on June 1, 2014; in Overland Park, Kansas on June 29. 2014; in San Jose Aug 22, 2014, Athens Greece Nov 29, 2014 and Pleasanton CA Dec 21. Many more Double Racing events are scheduled for 2015. For the lately schedule go to: http://www.doubleracing.com

The first European Double Road Race was scheduled to be held in Athens, Greece on November 29, 2014.

The race uses World Masters Association age-grading tables and is a USATF-certified, non-aided course. On July 21, 2013 at the Ft. Collins, Colorado Double Road Race, Libby James, 77, scored the top age-graded time in 2013 in the 10k women’s category for all races tracked by RunningTimes.com.
