= Walter Aipolani =

American singer (1955–2023)

- Also known as: Bruddah Waltah; The Father of Hawaiian Reggae
- Born: 1955
- Origin: Hilo, Hawaii Territory, U.S.
- Died: August 17, 2023 (aged 68)
- Genres: Reggae, Hawaiian, Jawaiian
- Instrument: Guitar
- Years active: 1979–2023
- Formerly of: Island Afternoon
- Website: bruddahwaltah.com//

Walter Aipolani (1955 – August 17, 2023), known as Bruddah Waltah, was an American singer, songwriter and guitarist of Hawaiian music. He was born in Keaukaha near Hilo, and moved to Oahu as a child with his family. In the 1980s, he began playing gigs in Waikiki. He was called the Father of Hawaiian Reggae as he and bands he played with, such as Island Afternoon, popularized Hawaiian-style reggae music in the 1980s and 1990s.

== Career ==
Aipolani's first performances, in 1980, were with his brothers, in their band Aku Palu (which means “Bloody Fish Guts”). Their manager was shot just as they were preparing to release their first recording, and the band broke up, to play for a time with their uncle's Hawaiian music group, Na Mele Kani. Their sister, a dancer and musician who was performing in New Zealand, had sent the brothers a cassette tape of Bob Marley's music. Later, as the brothers learned more about Rasta culture and music, they started a series of free concerts in Honolulu in 1983, called Tumbleland Jams.

One of Aipolani's best-known works, "Sweet Lady of Waiāhole," described local fruit vendor Fujiko Shimabukuro. Another song, “Keep Hawaiian Lands” was inspired by Bob Marley's “Waiting in Vain”. In his covers of reggae classics such as No Woman No Cry, Waltah changed many of the lyrics to fit the particularities of Hawaiian culture and politics:

By relocating Marley's smash hit to Hawai‘i, Aipolani's lyrics reverberate strongly with Native Hawaiians; by using Marley's song and identity, Aipolani links the conditions of poverty and oppression experienced by Native Hawaiians to those experienced by Jamaicans . . . its relationship with ‘‘Keep Hawaiian Lands’’ turns it into a patriotic song demonstrating love for the land, an anthem of protest against development, colonial dispossession, and Western encroachment. The chorus, ‘‘Ua mau ke ea o ka ‘a ̄ina i ka pono (the life of the Land is perpetuated in righteousness)’’ is often recognized as the government motto for the state of Hawai‘i.

Aipolani's first recorded album, Hawaiian Reggae was a top hit in Hawaii in the early 1990s, selling nearly 100,000 cassette tapes as the Hawaiian reggae, or Jawaiian craze took off. Aipolani and several other Hawaiian reggae musicians disliked the term “Jawaiian”, preferring to describe their music as Hawaiian. The term Jawaiian sparked controversy, with some musicians and critics feeling it was disrespectful to both Hawaiian and Jamaican cultures.

Aipolani was influenced by Bob Marley, Elton John, Creedence Clearwater Revival, The Bee Gees, and The Beatles, He has played with Ryan Hiraoka, Keaka Kawaauhau, HHB, Dirty Roots, Mana‘o Company, Sons of Yeshua, and Ho‘aikane. He has also toured extensively, opening for Steel Pulse, Gregory Isaacs, Inner Circle, UB40, and other top 40 musicians. His brothers, and a sister, were also musicians, as is his nephew, Ruban Nielson of the group Unknown Mortal Orchestra.

Aipolani lived in Hilo and played regularly at venues in the Hawaiian Islands and the U.S. mainland.

== Death ==
Aipolani died on August 17, 2023, at the age of 68.

== Awards ==
- Na Hoku Hanohano Award for best contemporary album

== Discography ==
- Hawaiian Reggae 1991
- Take My Lovin’, 1994, Platinum Pacific Records
- Ka Hoʻina, 1997, JussahNuddahBruddah Records (Walter Aipolani & Joed Miller)
