= Great Aloha Run =

Annual running race in Honolulu, Hawaii

The Great Aloha Run was a road running competition that took place annually in Honolulu, Hawaii on the third weekend in February (Washington's Birthday in the United States). It was a charity event that benefitted Carole Kai Charities, a philanthropic fund run by Hawaii entertainer Carole Kai. Kai, Honolulu Marathon founder Jack Scaff, M.D., and publicist-journalist Buck Buchwach founded the race in 1985, and since its inception it has donated over $14 million to over 100 non-profit organizations in Hawaii.

Kaiser Permanente was the title sponsor for the 2010 race until 2018, when Hawai'i Pacific Health took the title sponsorship through 2024. Prior to that, local telephone company Hawaiian Telcom was the title sponsor from 2005 to 2009, while the Honolulu Advertiser has been a sponsor of the race since its inception.

The 8.15 miles (13.12 km) course started in downtown Honolulu on Nimitz Highway across from Aloha Tower, and ran west on Nimitz Highway along Honolulu Harbor, under the Interstate H-1 viaduct near Honolulu International Airport, and along Kamehameha Highway, finishing on the floor of Aloha Stadium. The Aloha Tower to Aloha Stadium route gives the race its name.

About 25,000 runners, mostly Hawaii residents, ran the race each year. This number also included as many as 5,000 members of the United States Armed Forces who run in formation as the "Sounds of Freedom" division. The Great Aloha Run is the second largest road race in Hawaii, after the Honolulu Marathon, which attracted an international field and is marketed heavily in Japan.

On September 3, 2025, it was announced that the Great Aloha Run was concluded with its 41st running in February 2025.
