= Road running =

Sport of running on roads

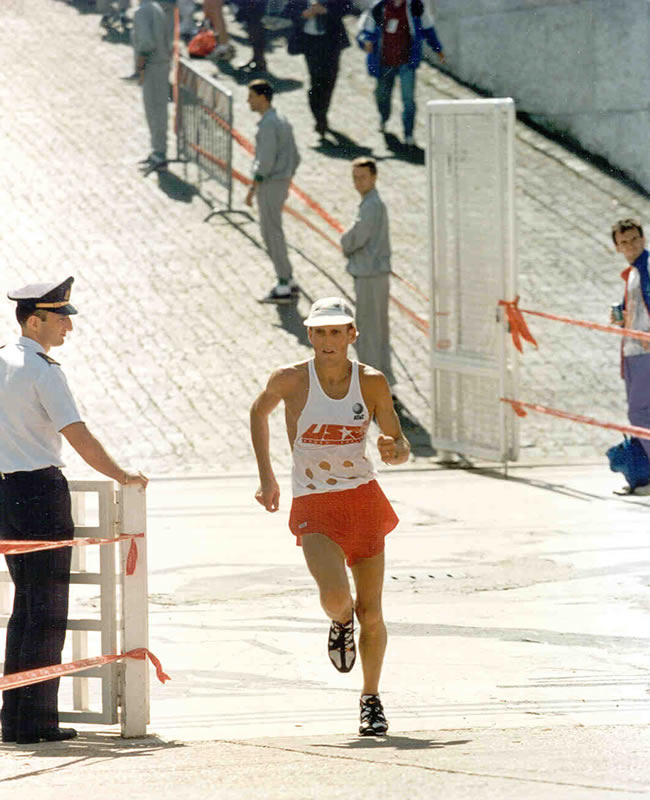
Road running in a U.S. Air Force marathon

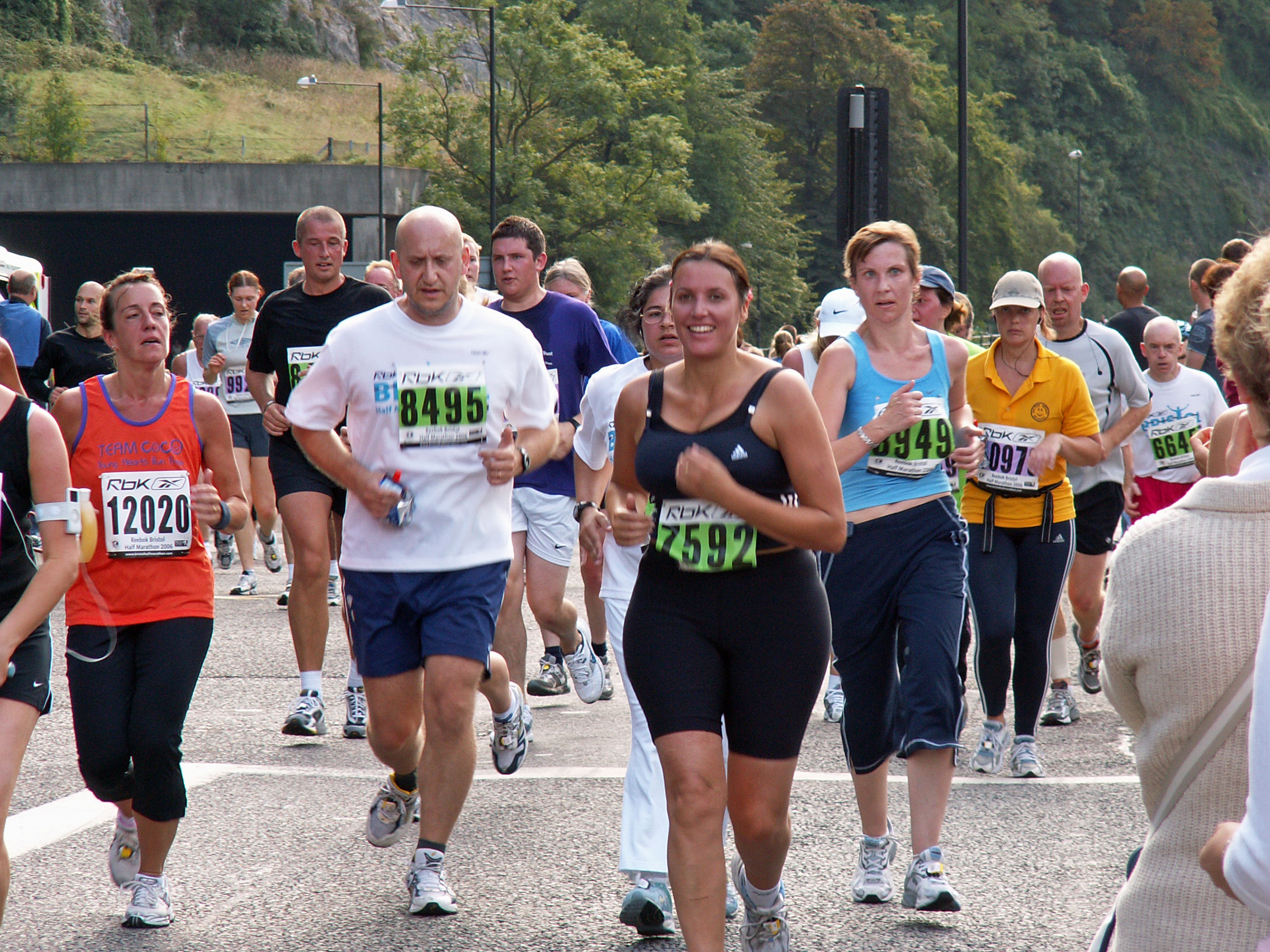
People taking part in the Bristol Half Marathon

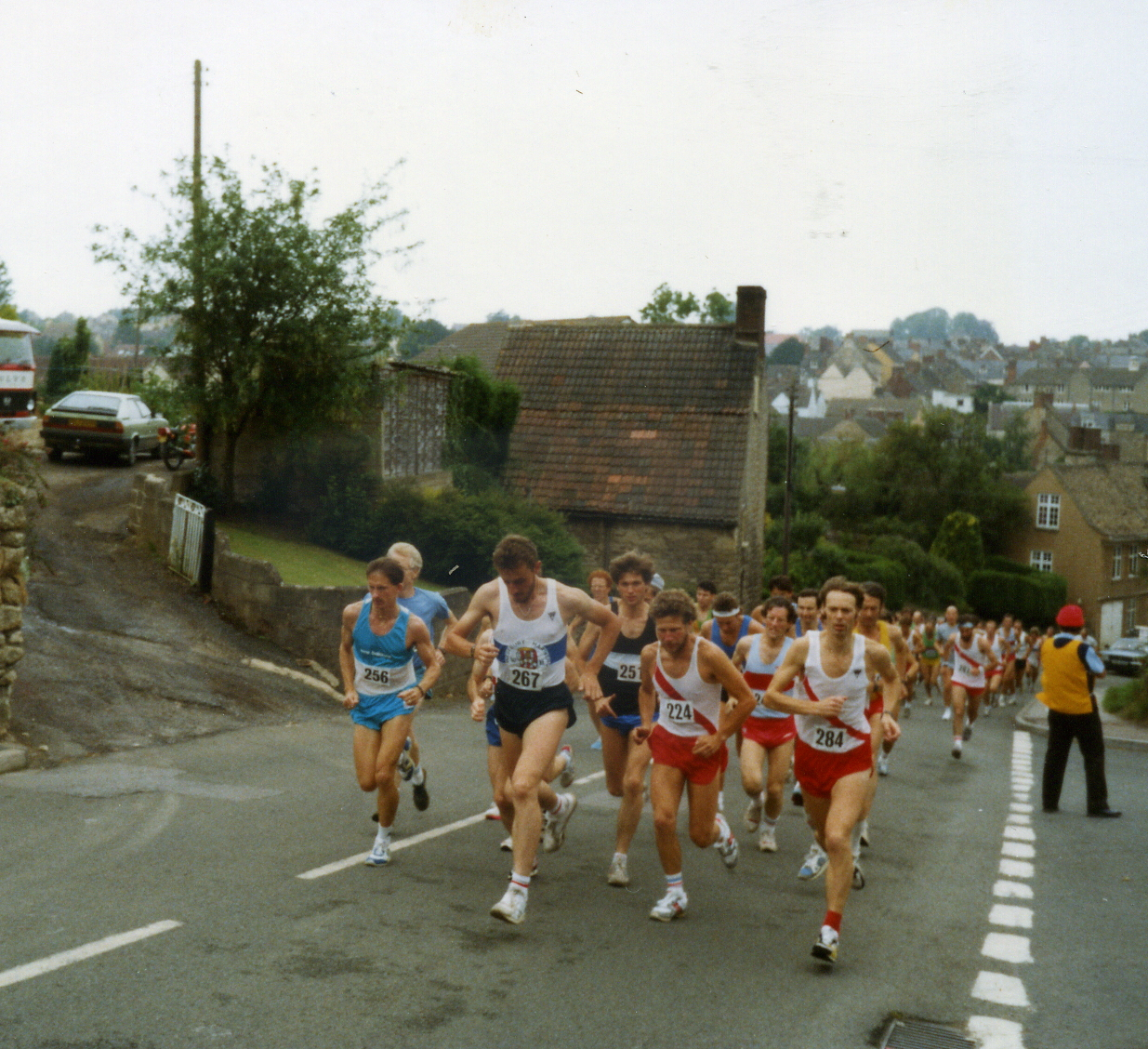
Athletes at the start of a 10-mile race in Gloucestershire in England, UK in 1990.

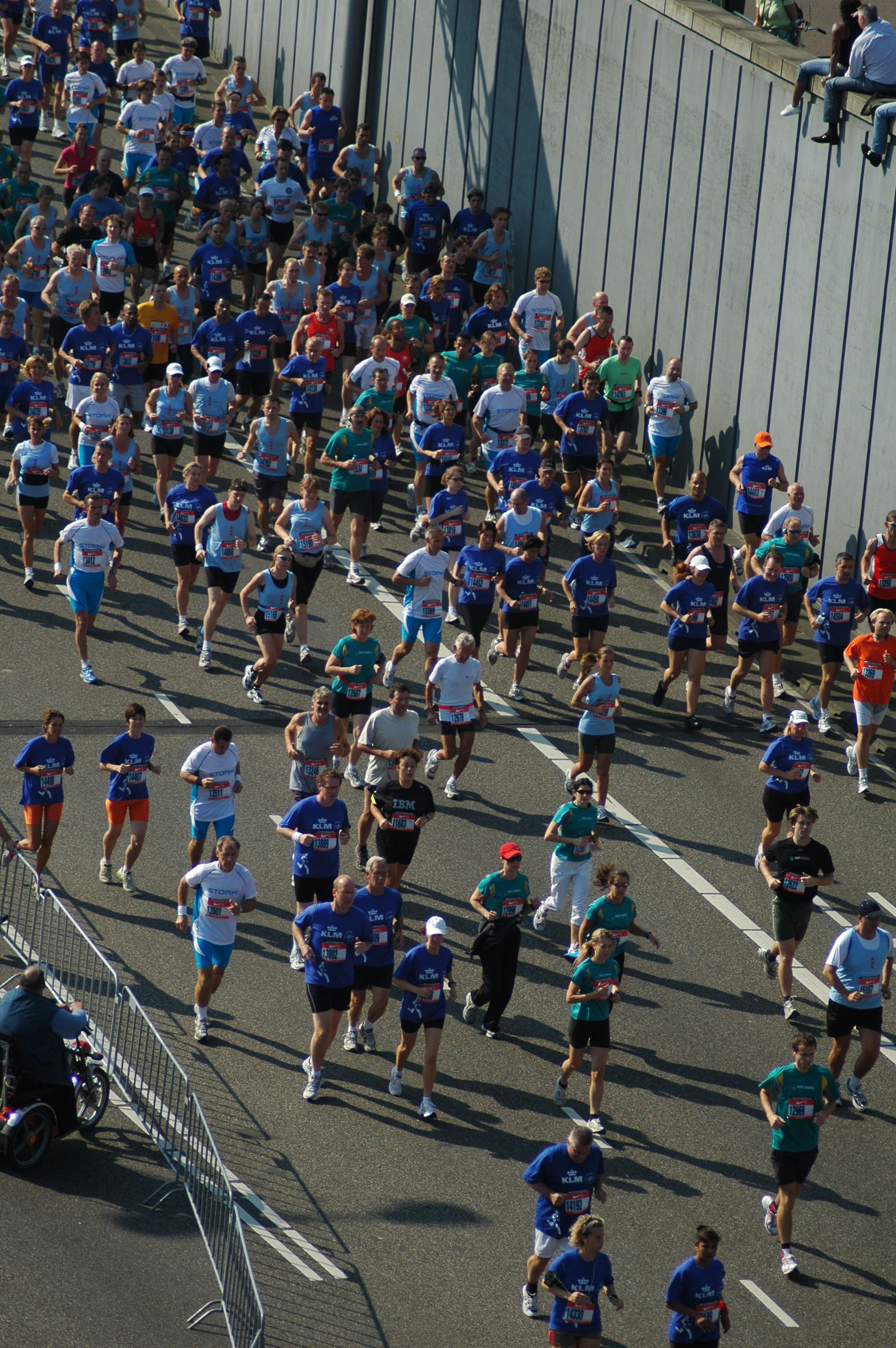
The Dam tot Damloop is a road race from Amsterdam to Zaandam in the Netherlands

Road running is the sport of running on a measured course over an established road. This differs from track and field on a regular track and cross country running over natural terrain.

These events are usually classified as long-distance according to athletics terminology, with races typically ranging from 5 kilometers to 42.2 kilometers in the marathon. They may involve large numbers of runners or wheelchair entrants. Since the late 2010s, some road running events also offer Nordic Walking as a separate competition along the same route. The four most common World Athletics recognized distances for road running events are 5K runs, 10K runs, half marathons and marathons.

Running on the road is an alternative surface to running on a trail, track, or treadmill. For many people looking to participate in running as an activity or sport, there are multiple opportunities that can be found on the road.

Road running is one of several forms of road racing, which also includes road bicycle racing and motor vehicle road racing.

== Courses ==
Race courses are usually held on the streets of major cities and towns but can be on any road. World Athletics recognizes eleven common distances for road races that are eligible to be counted for records if they meet the eligibility criteria: 1 mile (1,609.3 m), 5 kilometres (3.1 mi), 10 kilometres (6.2 mi), 15 kilometres (9.3 mi), 10 miles (16.1 km), 20 kilometres (12.4 mi), half marathon (21.098 km or 13.1 mi), 25 kilometres (15.5 mi), 30 kilometres (19 mi), 35 kilometres (21.7 mi), marathon (42.195 km or 26.2 mi), 50 kilometres (31.1 mi), and 100 kilometres (62.1 mi). The 24-hour run is also recognized. Of these, the 5K, 10K, 25K, 30K, half marathon, marathon, and 100K are distances that are recognized for world records.

Some major events have unique distances. The Fifth Avenue Mile in New York City, United States is 1.0 mile (1.6 km); the "Round the Bays" run in Auckland, New Zealand is 8.4 kilometres (5.2 mi); the Falmouth Road Race in Falmouth, Massachusetts is 7.1 miles (11.4 km); the Manchester Road Race in Manchester, Connecticut is 4.75 miles (7.64 km); "City to Surf" in Sydney, Australia is 14 kilometres (8.7 mi); Honolulu's "Great Aloha Run" is 8.15 miles (13.12 km); the "King Island Imperial 20" is 32 kilometres (20 mi) long; and the "Charleston Distance Run" in Charleston, West Virginia is 15 miles (24 km).

== Participation ==
Most road running events are open to the general public and attract participants of all skill levels. It is common for large events to draw thousands of runners. Men and women typically compete side by side, and amateur runners often share the course with elite athletes. In more prestigious races, there are usually separate heats for men and women, as well as for professional and non-professional runners. Some events also allow first-time amateurs to compete alongside members of running clubs and world-class athletes.

This inclusive nature has made road racing extremely popular. Millions of people around the world participate in thousands of races annually. In the United States alone, 18.1 million people registered for recreational road races in 2018.

While elite athletes can maintain paces of 4–5 minutes per mile (2.5–3 minutes per kilometre), the average pace for recreational runners is approximately 10 minutes per mile (6 minutes per kilometre). The majority of participants run for personal achievement, fitness, or enjoyment rather than competition, and many races accommodate this by remaining open long enough for individuals to jog or walk the distance.

== Timing ==
To accurately record finishing times in road races, organizers typically employ electronic timing systems provided by specialized timing companies. The most commonly used technology is radio-frequency identification (RFID). RFID tags may be embedded in disposable bibs, attached to shoelaces, or worn as ankle bands. Timing mats placed at the start and finish lines detect each runner's chip and automatically record their time.

This method is widely considered to be the most efficient and reliable way to track times for large numbers of participants.

== Benefits ==
=== Diversity ===
Road running is recognizable for its diverse features. Anyone is welcome to participate in road running whether it be for recreational activity or for the purpose of competition. Running is an activity that attracts people from all over the world and for any age. For example, many road racing events recognize finishers in an age group system which acts as a way to reward younger or older athletes who may not be able to compete with runners in a prime age.

=== Charity ===
Road races are often community-wide events that highlight or raise money for an issue or project. In the US, Susan G. Komen's Race for the Cure is held nationwide to raise breast cancer awareness. This race is also run in Germany, Italy and Puerto Rico. Similarly, Race for Life holds races throughout the UK to raise money for Cancer Research UK. First person "race reports" frequently appear on the Dead Runners Society electronic mailing list. Dublin, Ireland's Women's Mini-Marathon is said to be the largest all-female event of its kind in the world.

=== Motivation to be active ===
For many, competing in a local road race can be the motivation needed for individuals to pursue physical activity. In a study done by the United States Bureau for Labor Statistics, road running ranked third in the most common form of sport and exercise activity for Americans.

=== Physical benefit ===
Running on the roads has a different effect on the muscles in the human body opposed to running on the treadmill. Treadmills are made to assist running form due to the way the belt pushes your legs back enhancing movement. Running on the road through various conditions such as hills will do more to strengthen glutes, hamstrings, quads, and smaller muscles in the legs. Additionally, running on the road can help improve bone density as your body breaks down from impact and then regenerates itself.

== Disadvantages ==
=== Impact ===
As with any type of running, there is a risk of natural wear and tear on the human body due to the different movements required to run. The difference with road running compared to other forms is that for long periods of time, a runner will continuously be landing on a harder surface, which can lead to various overuse injuries. In any given year, on average 65–80 percent of runners experience some type of injury. In order to decrease the risk of becoming injured from impact on the road, runners can change their shoes every 300–400 miles (500–650 km). This is important because high mileage shoes have poor shock absorption and worn down treads which can cause pain.

=== Danger ===
One danger in road running, as opposed to running in any other location, is that vehicles drive by regularly at high speeds. Runners can take precautions to decrease this risk, including: wearing reflective gear, wearing bright colors, running only during daylight, wearing a headlight, and running on the side of the road opposite traffic.

=== Costs ===
Although running can seem like a very cheap activity that anyone can partake in, there are some expenses. Replacing running shoes every 400–500 miles (650–800 km) costs money. Also, road race entry fees can be expensive because they have to cover the costs incurred by the race organizer. The entry fee for famous marathons across the world can be considerable.

== Governing body and international organizations ==
The international governing body for road racing is World Athletics (formerly IAAF). World Athletics aims to set the standards for competitions by ensuring that all participants are drug-free and that all equipment used is legal. World Athletics measures each race course to give it an World Athletics certification rating. Once a race course is certified, the course can be counted for different records or rankings.

National governing bodies which are affiliated to World Athletics are responsible for road races held in their country. Of the thousands of road races held each year, 238 races, including some premier ones, are members of the Association of International Marathons and Distance Races (AIMS). Many race organizers (or the running clubs which conduct the races) are members of the Road Runners Club of America. In addition, the USA Track & Field plays a role in selecting representatives for certain international competitions under the Amateur Sports Act of 1978.

Competitors from around the world participate in what are dubbed the "elite" races for cash prizes. Elite level road running series include the World Marathon Majors, the Great Run series, and IAAF Road Race Label Events.

== Main competitions ==
=== Marathon and half marathon events ===
- World Marathon Cup
- World Half Marathon Championships
- European Marathon Cup
- European Half Marathon Cup

=== Race-walking events ===
- World Race Walking Team Championships
- European Race Walking Cup

== See also ==
- Double road race
- Fell running
- Cross country running
- List of largest running events
- Orienteering
- Track running
- Trail running
