= Open chord =

Guitar technique

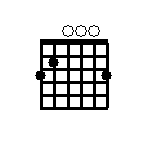
G major chord for guitar (open).

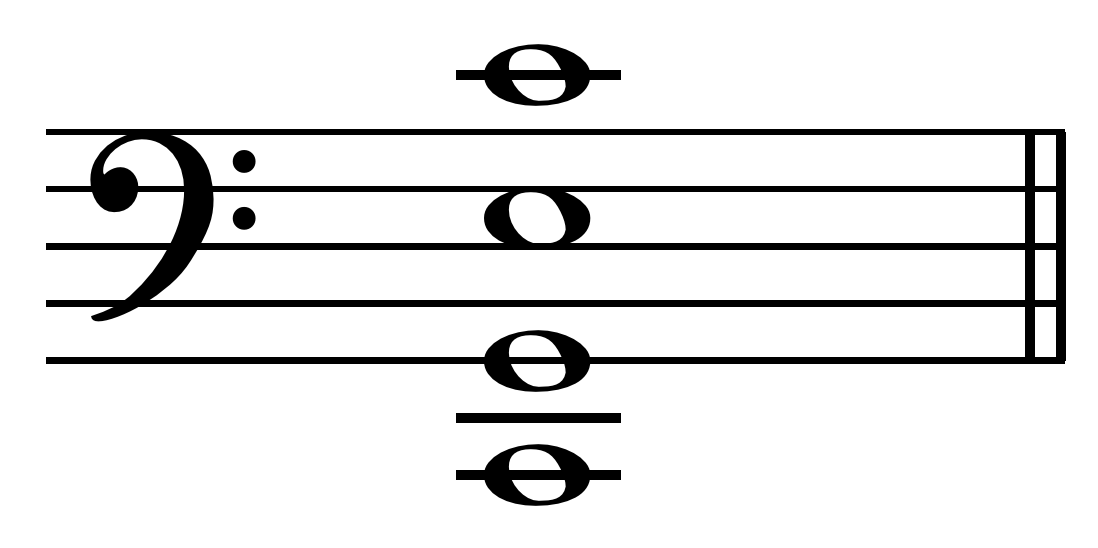
Violoncello chord on C. Bottom two strings are open.

In music for stringed instruments, especially guitar, an open chord (open-position chord) is a chord that includes one or more strings that are not fingered. An open string vibrates freely, whereas a fingered string will be partially dampened unless fingered with considerable pressure, which is difficult for beginner players. In an open chord, the unfingered strings are undampened, and the player is able to exert maximum pressure on the fretted strings, to avoid unwanted dampening. On a regular six-string guitar, an open chord can have from one to six open strings sounding. In contrast, all of the strings are fingered for a barre chord, which requires greater technique to be allowed to ring freely. To dampen a barre chord, a player simply needs to relax the fingers. Fully dampening an open chord requires the player to roll the fingers of the left hand over the open strings, or else dampen with the right hand.

Guitarists use capos, which are devices that clamp down the strings to create a movable nut, to play open chords in different keys. With a capo on the first fret, the guitarist can finger the shape of the open A minor chord, but the result will be a B♭ minor chord. Open chords on guitar are used in a wide range of popular music and traditional music styles.

== Cowboy chords ==
In guitar music, open chords are also called cowboy chords owing to their simplicity and reminiscence of a "cowboy strummin' away on the prairie."

== Advanced open chords ==
Advanced guitar chords may rely on the use of open strings alongside strings fretted in higher positions. For example fretting the E-barre shape on the fifth fret without the barre allows the open E, A and E to ring alongside the higher position E, A and C#. The strumming on the middle section of "Stairway to Heaven" is played using such chords. Chord books are available including such chords, but many guitarists experiment to form their own distinctive chords.

== Other strings ==
When composers instruct string section players (violin, viola, cello, double bass) to play double stops (two notes at once) or triple stops (three notes at once), they often include one or two open strings in the chord voicing, unless they are writing for a virtuoso soloist. When writing for amateur or youth ensembles, composers typically use open strings to form double stops; in this fashion, the player only has to "stop" one note. Using open strings in double stops and triple stops also improves the resonance and sustain of the chord, because open strings ring more fully and longer than "stopped" strings.

== See also ==
- Close and open harmony
- Voicing (music)
