= Quiet Storm Records =

Hawaiian record label

- Founded: 1992
- Founder: John and Debra Iervolino
- Country of origin: United States
- Location: Hawaii
- Official website: www.quietstorm.com

Quiet Storm Records is a Hawaii-based record label specializing in Hawaiian music.

== History ==
The label was formed by John and Debra Iervolino in 1992. John Iervolino serves as president. The company has won a Na Hoku Hanohano Award. In 2001, Quiet Storm was not only the top independent Hawaiian label, but outpaced the major labels in the Hawaiian genre. In 2003, Quiet Storm's sales surpassed the $1 million level, although its position within the Hawaiian music market had declined to 4th. The company has seen strong sales in Japan. Aside from music recording and production, the company has also set up a distribution division that includes music, books, and DVDs produced by other entities. A declining market for CDs, and accounts-receivable defaults are among the challenges faced by Quiet Storm.

== Output ==
The label has become known for its compilation CDs, which intermingle artists which are only locally known with recordings, leased from major labels, of well-known artists. They have also found success with their own signed artists, including EA.

== See also ==
- List of record labels
