= Henry Kaleialoha Allen =

Hawaiian steel guitarist and singer (1933–2022)

- Born: June 11, 1933; Hilo, Hawaii, U.S.
- Died: December 24, 2022 (aged 89) Kahului, Hawaii, U.S.
- Occupation: Musician
- Instruments: Guitar, vocals

Henry Kaleialoha Allen (June 11, 1933 – December 24, 2022) was an American steel guitarist and singer from Hawaii.

== Biography ==
Allen was born June 11, 1933, in Hilo, Hawaii. In 1941 his family relocated to Honolulu. Allen graduated from President William McKinley High School in 1952. He began his professional career working in Hawaiian hotels, joining the musicians union in 1953 and working with Alfred Apaka. He then moved to Los Angeles in 1956 where he studied jazz. He moved back to Hawaii at the urging of Apaka, setting up a company entitled Polynesian Promotions in Lahaina on the island of Maui. In the 1970s he worked for the Kaanapali, Hawaii Hilton, producing music for dining and for evening dancing. He also produced music for the Royal Lahaina Resor, the Sheraton Maui, and the Westin Maui. He opened a Planet Hollywood in Maui in 1995. In 2015 Allen received the Lifetime Achievement Award presented by the Hawai'i Academy of Recording Arts while simultaneously receiving from the Hawaii State Senate a resolution of congratulations.

Allen died in Kahului, Hawaii, on December 24, 2022, at the age of 89.

== Career ==
Allen played steel guitar and sung. He toured internationally, achieving particular popularity in Japan. Allen composed and arranged Hawaiian music. For his production company he produced and directed "Polynesian spectaculars". He performed on a Fender double Stringmaster. Allen performed for various television series, including Barnaby Jones, Hawaiian Eye and Mama's Family, and regularly appeared on the QVC shopping channel. He released at least three albums, Blue Hawaii, Magic of Steel Guitar, and Memories of Hawaii. Allen worked with such artists as Alfred Apaka and Martin Denny.
