= Irie (surname) =

Irie is a surname. Notable people with the surname include:

- Evie Irie, Australian pop singer
- Sweetie Irie, British reggae DJ (b.1971)
- Tippa Irie, British reggae singer
- Welton Irie, Jamaican reggae DJ (b.1961)

== Japanese ==
- Atsuo Irie (入江 淳夫; born 1937), Japanese ice hockey player
- Mayuko Irie, actress (b.1962)
- Nanami Irie (入江 ななみ; born 1995), Japanese sport wrestler
- Ryosuke Irie, swimmer (b.1990)
- Saaya Irie, glamour model (b.1993)
- Shigehiro Irie, professional wrestler (b.1988]]
- Tadashi Irie, yakuza overlord (b.1944)
- Taikichi Irie, photographer (1905–1992)
- Takako Irie, film actress (1911–1995)
- Toru Irie, soccer player (b.1977)
- Toshikazu Irie, soccer player (b.1984)
- Toshio Irie, swimmer (b.1911)
- Toshio Irie (bureaucrat), politician (1901–1972)
- Yasuhiro Irie, animator (b.1971)
- Yu Irie, film director (b.1979)
- Yuki Irie (入江 ゆき; born 1992), Japanese sport wrestler
