= Loyal Garner =

Loyal Garner (September 28, 1946 – November 15, 2001) was a Hawaiian musician and de facto leader of the Hawaiian singing group Local Divas. Her hits included "Shave Ice" from the 1982 album Island Feelings and "Blind Man in the Bleachers" from her 1981 album Loyal.

== Death ==
Nicknamed the "Lady of Love", Loyal E. Garner died on November 15, 2001, from colon cancer, aged 55.

== Posthumous ==
In 2007 the Hawaii Academy of Recording Arts awarded Garner with a posthumous Na Hoku Hanohano Lifetime Achievement Award. On April 2, 2007, Hula Records re-issued Garner's Hawai'i Today for the first time on CD format at the request of fans.

== Discography ==
=== Albums ===
- Lady of Love (1976)
- Hawai'i Today (1977)
- Loyal (1981)
- Loyal Garner (1981)
- Island Feelings (1982)
- More Than Just a Song (1987)
- Hawaii's Lady of Love (compilation, 1989)
- Loyal...The Best of (compilation, 1989)
- I Shall Sing (1992)
- A Loyal Kind of Christmas (1992)
- Sounds of Progress (1993)
