= Kentaro Sato =

Japanese composer (born 1981)

- Born: 12 May 1981 (age 45); Hamamatsu, Shizuoka, Japan
- Genres: Contemporary classical, film scores, video game
- Occupations: Composer, conductor
- Website: http://www.wisemanproject.com

Kentaro Sato (佐藤 賢太郎, Satō Kentarō; born 12 May 1981), aka Ken-P, is a composer, conductor, orchestrator, and clinician of media music (film, TV, and game) and concert music (Symphonic and Choral). He is also an accomplished lyricist and voice-over artist. His works have been broadcast, performed, and recorded in North and South America, Asia, and Europe by well-known groups including the London Symphony Orchestra, Philharmonia Orchestra, and Sydney Symphony Orchestra. In 2005, he was appointed a resident composer/assistant conductor of the Torrance Symphony. He is also a frequent guest conductor and lecturer for various workshops and reading sessions on choral music and composition/orchestration around the world.

Sato was born in Hamamatsu, Shizuoka, Japan, known as the city of music and instruments. He holds a Master of Music in Conducting (choral emphasis) with Distinction and a Bachelor of Music in Media and Commercial Writing from California State University, Northridge (CSUN). In addition to his degree in Music, he also holds degree in Cinema from Santa Monica College.

== Musical style ==
His choral works, especially a cappella works, are full of rich and colorful harmony with a sense of movement provided by individually moving vocal lines within closely voiced harmony. His works for symphony usually have bright and brilliant orchestration with a clear sense of melody which is a reflection of his experience as a composer/orchestrator in Hollywood.

== Musical works ==
=== Commercial music ===
- Film: A Christmas Prince: The Royal Wedding (Additional Music)
- Film: A Christmas Prince (Additional Music)
- Film: Baahubali 2: The Conclusion (Additional Music, Orchestration)
- Film: Sisi … und ich erzähle euch die Wahrheit (Music)
- Film: プライド (theme song arrangement)
- Film: ハイキック・ガール! (theme song arrangement)
- TV: A Christmas Prince: The Royal Wedding (Additional Music)
- TV: The Bill Cunningham Show (Additional Music)
- TV: The Dr. Oz Show (Additional Music)
- TV: Judge Judy (Additional Music)
- TV: Like, Share, Die (Additional Music)
- TV: Primer Impacto (Additional Music)
- TV: El Gordo y la Flaca (Additional Music)
- TV: Brennpunkt (Additional Music)
- TV: Madam Cutie On Duty (Additional Music)
- TV: Alt for Norge (Additional Music)
- TV: 大藥坊 (Additional Music)
- TV: 我們的天空 (Additional Music)
- TV: POLICAJTI Z CENTRA (Additional Music)
- TV: Rodinné prípady (Additional Music)
- TV: Sommer i Sunny Beach (Additional Music)
- Video Game: Elden Ring (Music Supervisor, Orchestration, Recording Director) FromSoftware
- Video Game: Medal of Honor: European Assault (Orchestration) Electronic Arts
- Video Game: Tom Clancy's Ghost Recon Advanced Warfighter(Orchestration) Ubisoft
- Video Game: Tom Clancy's Ghost Recon Advanced Warfighter 2(Orchestration) Ubisoft
- Video Game: Dissidia 012 Final Fantasy (Orchestration and Lyrics) Square Enix
- Video Game: Dissidia Final Fantasy (2015 video game) (Orchestration, Lyrics and Conducting) Square Enix
- Video Game: Final Fantasy Type-0 (Additional Music Composition, Orchestration and Lyrics) Square Enix
- Video Game: Final Fantasy IV Pixel Remaster (Vocal Recording Director) Square Enix
- Video Game: Final Fantasy Agito (Additional Music Arrangement and Lyrics) Square Enix
- Video Game: GRAN SAGA (Orchestration) NPIXEL, Gameplex
- Video Game: Kurokishi-to Shiro-no Mao (Orchestration) Grani, Mynet Games
- Video Game: Becoming Bytes (Music) Chariots Gaming
- Video Game: Avalon Code Title Song "Deep Forest" (Arrangement) Matrix Software
- Album Record: Wonderful World by Israel "Iz" Kamakawiwoʻole (Orchestration)
- Album Record: Symphonic Tale: The Rune of Beginning (Music from Suikoden II (Orchestration, Conducting, Music Direction) performed by Budapest Symphony Orchestra.
- Album Record: Symphonic Tale: An Unforgettable Journey (Music from Grandia (Orchestration, Conducting, Music Direction) performed by Budapest Symphony Orchestra.

=== Symphonic music ===
- Symphonic Tale: Peter Pan
  - 1. The Boy Who Won’t Grow Up / The Peter Pan’s Fanfare
  - 2. Wendy’s Kiss
  - 3. Tinker Bell / Flying to the Neverland
  - 4. Pirates of the Jolly Roger
  - 5. The Lost Boys
  - 6. Cinderella, Wendy's Story
  - 7. The Mermaids' Lagoon
  - 8. The Never Bird
  - 9. Dance of the Native Warriors
  - 10. Memory of Mother
  - 11. Hook or Me, This Time!
  - 12. Return Home
- Symphonic Tale: An Unforgettable Journey (Music from Grandia) *an arrangement work in 14 movements.
- Symphonic Tale: The Rune of Beginning (Music from Suikoden II) *an arrangement work in 23 movements.
- Wings of Dreams
- The Wind of Grassland
- Christmas Overture
- Redlands Overture
- Star Ocean Overture
- Freedom Overture
- A Gift from the Ocean
- Going Home with You
- The Great Voyages of Captain Little

=== Choral music ===
- Missa pro Pace (Mass for Peace) – SATB divisi, Latin
  - 1. Kyrie
  - 2. Gloria
  - 3. Sanctus
  - 4. Agnus Dei
- Phoenix – SATB, Orchestra (Chamber Orch. ver/Piano ver/Organ ver), Latin
  - 1. Locus Felix (The Happy Place)
  - 2. Avis Phoenix (Phoenix, the Bird)
  - 3. Mors et Resurrectio Phoenicis (Death and Resurrection of the Phoenix)
  - 4. Carmen Phoenici (Song to the Phoenix)
- Requiem Pacis (Requiem of Peace) – SATB, Soprano Solo, and Chamber Orchestra (Piano ver/Organ ver), Latin
  - 1. Requiem Aeternam et Kyrie
  - 2. Sanctus
  - 3. Agnus Dei et Lux Aeterna
  - 4. Subvenite
  - 5. In Paradisum
- Te Deum – SATB, Organ or Piano, Percussions Latin
  - 1. Te Deum Laudamus
  - 2. Te Gloriosus
  - 3. Tu Rex Gloriae
  - 4. Te Ergo Quaesmus
  - 5. Salvum Fac
- Veni Sancte Spiritus – SMA, Orchestra ver./Organ ver./Piano ver., Latin
  - 1. Veni et Emite
  - 2. Consolator Optime
  - 3. O Lux Beatissima (This movement is a cappella)
  - 4. Da Tuis Fidelibus
- Missa Trinitas – SSA, divisi, Latin
  - 1. Kyrie
  - 2. Gloria
  - 3. Sanctus
  - 4. Benedictus
  - 5. Agnus Dei
- Cantata Amoris (Cantata of Love) – SATB divisi, Latin
  - 1. Sectamini Caritatem
  - 2. Diligamus Invicem
  - 3. Nihil Sum
  - 4. Deus Caritas Est
- Arbor Mundi (World Tree|世界樹) – TTBB and Piano, Latin
  - 1. Expergisci (Awakening|目覚め)
  - 2. Strepitus Candidi (White Noises|白いざわめき)
  - 3. Hasta Fulminea (Spear of Lightning|光の槍)
  - 4. Carmen Imbris (Song of Rain|雨の歌)
  - 5. Sensus (A Sensation|思い)
  - 6. Carmen Arboris Mundi (World Tree Song|世界樹の歌)
- Fabulae Persei (Tales of Perseus|ペルセウス物語) – TTBB, Organ or Piano with optional Percussions and Narration, Latin
  - 1. Perseus Iuvenis (The Young Perseus|若きペルセウス)
  - 2. Eius Die Natali (On His Birthday|誕生日に)
  - 3. Typhon (Typhon|テュポーン)
  - 4. Imprecatio (The Curse|呪い)
  - 5. Epistula Andromedae (Andromeda's Letter|アンドロメダの手紙)
  - 6. Arma Deorum (Arms from the Gods|神々の武具)
  - 7. Medusa (Medusa|メドゥーサ)
  - 8. Pegasus, Equus Ales (Pegasus, a Whinged Horse|天馬ペガサス)
  - 9. Proelium cum Typhone (Battle with Typhon|テュポーンとの戦い)
  - 10. Perseus Heros (The Hero Perseus|英雄ペルセウス)
- Laetentur Caeli (Let the Heavens be Glad) – SATB and String Orchestra (Piano ver./Organ ver.), Latin
  - 1. Laetitia
  - 2. Misericordia
  - 3. Iustitia
- Three Love Song set – SATB divisi, English
  - 1. Love in the Sky
  - 2. Love in Bloom
  - 3. Love on Fire
- In Laude Iesu – SATB, Latin
  - 1. Ne Timeas, Maria
  - 2. Lux Fulgebit
  - 3. Ave Verum Corpus
  - 4. O Filii et Filiae
- Ireland, a little bit of Heaven – SATB, English
  - 1. An Irish Lullaby
  - 2. Who Threw the Overalls in Mistress Murphy's Chowder
  - 3. The Kerry Dance
  - 4. Danny Boy
- Uta'ngoe-wa Kawarazu (Singing Unchanged|歌声は変わらず) – SATB, Piano, Japanese
  - 1. Uta-nga Kikoeru (I Hear a Song|歌が聞こえる)
  - 2. Ano Koro (Those days|あの頃)
  - 3. Kyo-mo Dokokade(Somewhere |今日もどこかで)
- Ako'ngare-to Tomoni (With Adoration|憧れと共に) – TTBB/SATB, Piano, Japanese
  - 1. Uta-ni Ako'ngarete (Falling in Love with Singing|歌に憧れて)
  - 2. On'ngaku-ni Na'tte (Music Coming to Be|音楽になって)
  - 3. Ke'tsui(Determination|決意)
  - 4. Boku-nga Utau Wake(Why I Sing|僕が歌う理由<わけ>)
  - 5. Boku-no Uta-nga Tsu'dzukuwake(Why My Music Continues|僕の歌が続く理由<わけ>)
- Kisetsu-no Shiori (Bookmarks of Four Seasons|季節のしおり) -SATB divisi, Japanese
  - 1. Haru-no Ashioto (Spring's Footsteps|春の足音)
  - 2. Natsu-no Enongu (Summer's Paints|夏の絵具)
  - 3. Aki-no Kangee(Autumn's Shadow Pictures|秋の影絵)
  - 4. Huyu-no Ibuki (Winter's Breath|冬の息吹)
- Umingame-no Uta (Sea Turtle Songs|ウミガメの唄) – SA&SATB Piano, Japanese
  - 1. Shiroi Kibo(White Hopes|白い希望)
  - 2. Yozora-no Tsubuyaki (Whispers of the Night Sky|夜空のつぶやき)
  - 3. Tsukiyo-no Tabidachi(Departure in the Moonlit Night|月夜の旅立ち)
  - 4. Shiroi Kiseki (White Miracle|白い奇跡)
- Bungaku-e (To Literature|文学へ) – SMA, Piano, Japanese, Narration
  - 1. Asa-no Hujidana (|朝の藤棚)
  - 2. Bozu (|ぼうず)
  - 3. Tabi-ni(|旅に)
  - 4. Kimi-ga Mita Sora (|君が見た空)
- Hajimariwa Itsumo (Always Start Anew|はじまりは、いつも) – SA, Piano, Japanese
  - 1. Sorano Staatorain (A Starting Line on the Sky|空のスタートライン)
  - 2. Mata, Ashita (Tomorrow Again|また、あした)
  - 3. Dekita! (I Did it!|できた！)
- Kokoro-no Umi-e (An Ocean Within|こころの海へ) – SA, Piano, Japanese
  - 1. Aozora-no Kujira (A Whale in the Blue Sky|青空のクジラ)
  - 2. Yumemiru Kurage (A Dreaming Jellyfish|夢見るクラゲ)
  - 3. Yuki-no Kaze-wo (Winds of Courage|勇気の風を)
- Boku-no Kioku-no Dokokani (Somewhere in My Memory|僕の記憶のどこかに) – SATB/SA/SAB and Piano, Japanese
  - Haru-no Ogawa (A Spring's Stream|春の小川)
  - Ware-wa Uminoko (A Child of the Ocean|われは海の子)
  - Mushi-no Koe (Bugs' Chorus in Autumn|虫の声)
  - Yuki-no Omoide (Memory of Snow|雪の思い出)
- Yozora-no Kioku-no Dokokani (Memory of the Night Sky|夜空の記憶のどこかに) – SATB/SA/SAB/TTBB and Piano, Japanese
  - Hoshi-wa Nani-wo (Stars, I wonder|星は何を)
  - Tanabata-no Omoi (Wishes of the Star Festival|七夕の想い)
  - Hanabi-to Tsuki-to (Fireworks and a Moon|花火と月と)
  - Oborozukiyo-no Namida (Tears in the Night with a Hazy Moon|朧月夜の涙)
- Anoko-no Kioku-no Dokokani (Somewhere in Her Memory|あの子の記憶のどこかに) – SATB/SA/SAB/TTBB and Piano, Japanese
  - 1. Ano Oto (Those Sounds|あの音)
  - 2. Mura-no Kajiya (The Village Blacksmith|村のかじ屋)
  - 3. Ano Kyoku (Those Tune|あの曲)
  - 4. Murama'tsuri (The Village Festival|村祭)
  - 5. Kono Mi'chi, Hurusato-e (The Road to My Homeland|この道、故郷へ)
- Iro'dzuita Sekai (Vibrant World|色づいた世界) – SA and Piano, Japanese
  - 1. Asa-no Kokoro (My Heart in the Morning|朝の心)
  - 2. Asa-no Gayō'shi (Drawing Paper in the Morning|朝の画用紙)
  - 3. Yoru-no Kokoro (My Heart at Night|夜の心)
  - 4. Mayonaka-no Dō'ngubako (My Toolbox at Midnight|真夜中の道具箱)
  - 5. Kokoro-no Tokei (A Clock in My Heart|心の時計)
- Ave Maria in C – SATB divisi, Latin
- Ave Maria in F – SSA and Piano, Latin
- Ave Regina Caerolum – SSA and Piano, Latin
- Ave Maris Stella – SATB divisi, Latin
- Carmen Laetitiae (Song of Joy) – SSA, divisi, Latin
- O Sacrum Convivium – SATB, Latin
- Nascatur Pax (Let Peace be Born) – SATB, divisi, Latin
- Ortus Carminis (Arising of Song) – SATB, optional Piano, Latin
- How Do I Love You? – SATB divisi, English
- 'Tween Dusk and Dreams – SATB divisi, English
- Newborn Joy (Angels We Have Heard on High) – SATB and Piano, English
- Sweet Days – SATB or TTBB English
- Little Star of Bethlehem – SATB, English
- Then Christmas Comes – TB divisi, English
- Whispered Secrets – SATB and Piano, English
- Innocence – SATB and Piano, English
- Fanfare for Tomorrow – SATB, Brass and Percussion, English
- Love's Philosophy – SATB and Piano, English-
- Prends Cette Rose (Receive This Rose) – SATB and Piano, French
- Wakaba-no Omoi (The Longing of a Young Leaf|若葉の想い) – SATB/SMA, Japanese
- Kaze-no Naka-ni (In the Wind|風の中に) – SATB/SMA, Japanese
- Omoide-wo Hiraite (Opening Our Memories|思い出をひらいて) – SA&SATB Piano, Japanese
- Kasanaru Koe-ni (|かさなる声に)-SATB/SMA/TBB, a cappella or Piano, Japanese
- Chorus! (Korasu!|コーラス！)-SATB divisi, Japanese
- Ima (This Moment|いま) – SAB and Piano, Japanese
- Engao-no Maho (Magic of Smile|笑顔の魔法) – SATB with Optional Piano, Japanese
- Tsunangari (Connection|つながり) – SA, SSAA, TTBB, SAB and/or SATB with Optional Piano, Japanese
- Mae-e (Forward|前へ) – SA, SSAA, TTBB, SAB and/or SATB with Optional Piano, Japanese
- Forever Forward – SATB with Optional Piano, Japanese
- Teppen-eno Michi (The Road|天辺への道|) – SATB, a cappella, Japanese
- Saijyo Sakezukuri-uta Imayo (|西条酒造り歌今様|) – SATB, a cappella or Piano, Japanese
- O Christmas Tree – TTBB, English
- Silent Noon – SATB and Piano, English – Music by R. Vaughan Williams, Cho. Arr. by Kentaro Sato
- Nbaba Rabusongu (Nbaba Love Song|んばば・ラブソング) – SA and Piano, Japanese, Cho. Arr. by Kentaro Sato
- Tenohira-wo Taiyo-ni (手のひらを太陽に) – SA and Piano, Japanese) Cho.Arr. by Kentaro Sato
- Anpanman-no March (アンパンマンのマーチ) – SA and Piano, Japanese) Cho. Arr. by Kentaro Sato

=== Musical ===
- Tenkochan-no Sotsugyoshiki (Graduation of Little Tenko|テンコちゃんの卒業式)
- Pica-mu's Wonder Story (Musical)
- Niji-no Kakehashi (Musical)
- Himitsu-no Takaramono (Musical)

== Awards and honors ==
- Winner of the 25th Anniversary Composition Contest hosted by the Choral Arts Ensemble of Rochester, MN (2008)
- 2nd Prize of the 2008 Singing City Choral Composition Contest
- Recipient of the 2006 ASCAP Foundation David Rose Award from the 2006 ASCAP Film Scoring Workshop
- Winner of the 26th Annual Choral Composition Contest presented by Ithaca College and Theodore Presser Company for the performance of his "How Do I Love You?" by the West Genesee High School Chorale, led by Anthony Alvaro in 2005.
- The 2nd Prize of the GPO Orchestration Competition (2005)
- 2004-2005 Outstanding bachelor's degree Graduate Award in Music from California State University, Northridge (2005)
- Winner of The 2004 Raymond W. Brock Memorial Composition Contest hosted by Winner of ACDA, American Choral Directors Association
- The 3rd Prize of the 5th Enterbrain Game Contest for Original Music (2001)
- The Grand Prize of the 2nd Omnibus Town Award (2000)

== Discography ==
- "Kentaro Sato: Japanese Choral Works for Mixed Voices, Vol. 1" (CLASSICAL NOVA): 2019
- "Kentaro Sato: Japanese Choral Works for Mixed Voices, Vol. 2" (CLASSICAL NOVA): 2019
- "Symphonic Tale: The Rune of Beginning (Music from Suikoden II)" (CLASSICAL NOVA): 2019
- "Maria Mater" performed by Vocalia Taldea (NB Musica): 2010
- "Kantika Sakra" performed by Kantika Korala (NB Musica): 2010
- "Film Design Box 4, Symphonic Tale of Peter Pan" performed by FILMharmonic Orchestra (Fontana Music Library): 2008
- "Then Christmas Comes" performed by Brethren (Brethren Group): 2007
- "Truth" from the 5th single CD "Changin'" by Stephanie (Sony Music Entertainment)
