= Eric Lee (musician) =

American songwriter

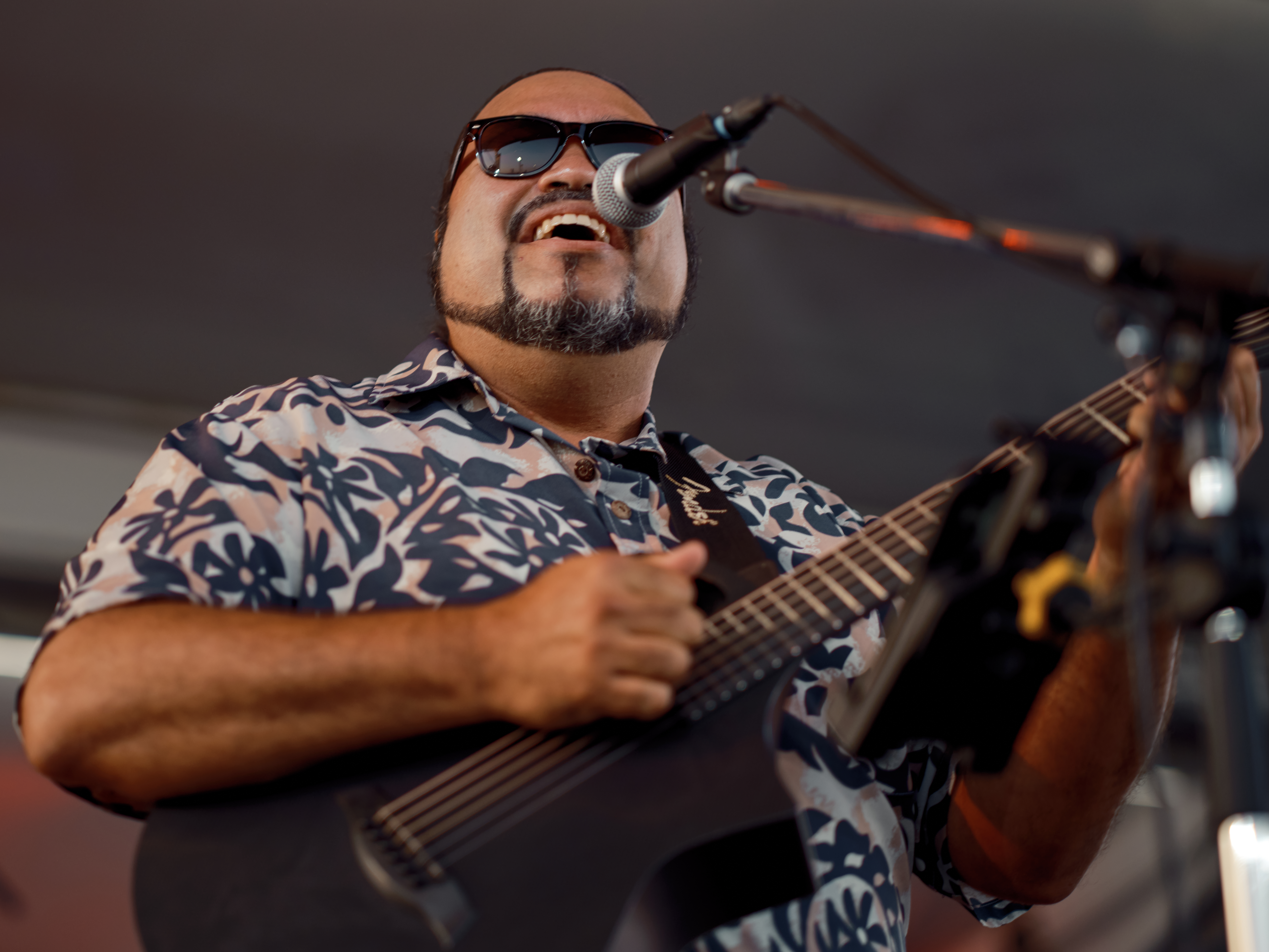
- Eric Lee performing in Yokosuka, Japan in 2024

Background information
- Origin: Mā'ili, O'ahu, Hawai'i, United States
- Genres: Hawaiian, blues rock, country, instrumental
- Occupations: Singer-songwriter, musician, record producer
- Instruments: Vocals, guitar, upright bass, electric bass, ukulele
- Years active: 1993–present
- Website: Eric Lee Official Site

Eric Lee is a Hawaiian musician, singer, songwriter, and producer. His work has appeared on more than 30 albums, including his work with The Kanile'a Collection, Nā Kama, The Ka'ala Boys, The Mākaha Sons, and his solo albums, Crossroads, Kawehilani, and his Twentieth Anniversary Anthology.

Lee grew up in Mā'ili, a small town on the Wai'anae coast of O'ahu, Hawai'i, known for its beaches and surf spots. Lee began his musical career at the age of 9 with his first instrument; a $15 'ukulele purchased at Woolworth's, and went on to play 'ukulele, piano, guitar, and electric & upright bass. He studied choral music and theory at Kamehameha Schools and later at the University of Hawaiʻi at Mānoa.

== Kanile‘a collection ==
After winning the 1993 Ka Hīmeni 'Ana competition, Lee recorded his first CD, Nahenahe with The Kanile'a Collection, which included guitarist Brian Mersberg and Jay Kauka on upright bass. That recording included Lee's first published Hawaiian composition, "Nā Nalu Ha'i O Mā'ili", which was written with the assistance of Hailama Farden and dedicated to Lee's brothers, who loved to surf the waves of Mā'ili. It also included a guest appearance by the guitarist Peter Moon. The Kanile'a Collection traveled throughout Hawai'i and Japan, playing for hula hālau (schools) at various hula competitions including the Merrie Monarch Hula Festival, and opening concerts for Robi Kahakalau and Hapa.

Lee performed with other musical groups, traveling to Samoa, Hong Kong, and Japan. He worked as a part-time studio musician, composing jingles and background music for commercial vendors, providing instrumentation and background vocals for other entertainers, and assisting in the production of recordings for various artists such as Pai'ea and Hailama Farden.

== Nā Kama ==
In 1998, Lee and bandmate Brian Mersberg reformed as Nā Kama and released their first recording, Ke Ala Hou, which was nominated for a Nā Hōkū Hanohano Award for Hawaiian language performance. In 2003, Nā Kama released their second recording, Come and See….Hawai‘i. With the addition of Danny Naipo on bass, they released their third recording Kamakolu in 2007, earning their first Nā Hōkū Hanohano Award for excellence in Hawaiian language performance. The 2008 release of their fourth recording, E Ola Ke Ali‘i: The Nā Kama Christmas Collection – Volume 1, earned them a second Nā Hōkū Hanohano Award, this time for Christmas Album of the Year. During Lee's 10-year association with Nā Kama, they shared the stage with many of Hawai‘i's artists, including the Mākaha Sons, Ho‘okena, Maunalua, Natalie Ai Kamauu, and Hōkū Zuttermeister.

== Ka‘ala Boys ==
Lee was also a member of the popular island music group, The Ka‘ala Boys, featuring bassist Rodney Bejer, drummer Elton McKeague, and falsetto vocalist Keoki V on 'ukulele. Together, they released three studio CDs, Solid (1999), Now (2000), and No Doubt About It (2002), a Christmas single, "Reggae Christmas" (2000) and a greatest hits CD, The Best of Ka'ala Boys (2002). The Ka'ala Boys travelled to the continental United States, Guam, Johnston Island, and many of Hawai'i's neighboring islands, sharing the stage with island groups like Kāpena, Fiji, Ten Feet, Typical Hawaiians, Kanalo, and Natural Vibrations.

== Solo work ==
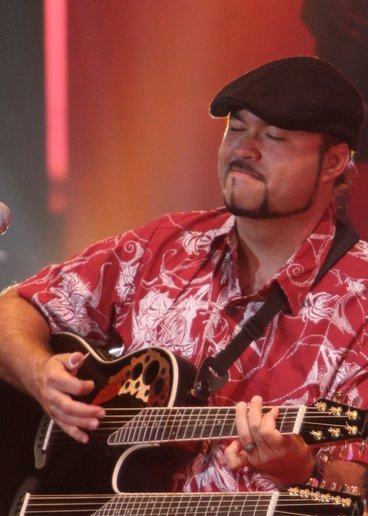
Eric Lee performing in Fukuoka, Japan, December 2010

In June 2007, Lee released a CD single, Camp Lē'ahi, composed for the summer program he worked at as music teacher. Lee also recorded a Japanese version of this song, for the Japanese students who attended the camp in the latter part of the summer.

In May 2009, Lee released his debut solo CD Crossroads. Lee originally released Crossroads exclusively as a digital download due to nationwide decline in CD sales. In October 2009, it was re-released as a special edition CD with three additional tracks. Lee performed all vocals and most of the instrumentation on the album. Several guest musicians were featured on Crossroads, including John Koko of the Mākaha Sons on upright acoustic bass, Bruce Shimabukuro on 'ukulele, and Kit Ebersbach on piano.

In 2010, Lee played concerts and festivals in California, Nevada, Hawai'i, and Japan, including Las Vegas's Lei Day Festival, the 20th Annual Prince Jonah Kūhiō Ho'olaule'a, and Osaka's 2010 Hula Picnic. He also produced and appeared on Hailama Farden's "Hawaiian Cowboy – A Tribute to Uncle Sol K. Bright", which was nominated for a Nā Hōkū Hanohano Award for Single of the Year.

To thank the fans and radio stations that supported him through his solo career, Lee released Hallelujah/Thunder Road in March 2011. Hallelujah, the classic song originally written and composed by Leonard Cohen, featured Lee on lead vocals and acoustic guitar and Peter Milo on backing vocals. It was released in response to the request of fans who heard him perform it at his many shows in Waikīkī and on tour. Thunder Road was composed by Lee during one of his tours of the West Coast of the U.S.

Lee's second solo album Kawehilani was released in May 2012 as a dedication to the life of his daughter, whom the album was named for. Kawehilani marked a return to Lee's traditional Hawaiian roots, including seven traditional Hawaiian melodies as well as four original compositions performed entirely on acoustic instruments with the addition of the ipu and pahu (two traditional Hawaiian percussion instruments) and steel guitar. Lee was quoted in a 2012 article as saying, "Kawehilani is a personal choice to return to my Hawaiian roots because it bookmarks a very important part of my life – the life of my daughter, whom this album is named after and dedicated to. When I thought about how I would celebrate her life with this album, I chose to do it this way: if she were physically here and asked me what it is that I do, I would've played and sang for her a Hawaiian tune."

== Mākaha Sons ==
Following the release of Kawehilani in 2012, Lee's career took an unexpected turn when he was asked to join The Mākaha Sons following the passing of longtime bassist and founding member, John Koko. Lee spent the next eighteen months touring and performing with the Mākaha Sons while continuing his solo career and working on new material for his Twentieth Anniversary Anthology. The Anthology, set for release Fall 2014, is a collection of songs both old and new from his solo career, as well as his time with popular island groups The Kanileʻa Collection, Nā Kama, KaʻAla Boys, and The Mākaha Sons.

As a full-time artist, Lee performs and tours frequently, sharing the stage with many artists and traveling throughout Hawai‘i, the Mainland U.S., the Pacific Islands and Asia, especially Japan. He composes and produces music for his own recordings as well as those of others, enjoying the opportunity to support them as well as working on projects for commercial vendors. From 2008 – 2012, Lee actively supported the Muscular Dystrophy Association of Hawai'i by performing regularly for them.

== Discography ==
=== Eric Lee ===
- 2014 – "20th Anniversary Anthology"
- 2012 – Kawehilani
- 2011 – Hallelujah/Thunder Road
- 2009 – Crossroads
- 2008 – Camp Lē‘ahi

=== Nā Kama ===
- 2008 – E Ola Ke Ali‘i: The Nā Kama Christmas Collection – Volume I
- 2006 – Kamakolu
- 2004 – Our ‘Ohana's 2nd Christmas (Compilation Album) – "Mary's Little Boy Child"
- 2003 – Come and See...Hawai‘i
- 2003 – Our ‘Ohana's 1st Christmas (Compilation Album) – "Christmas in the Islands"
- 1998 – Ke Ala Hou

=== Ka‘ala Boys ===
- 2006 – The Best of Ka‘ala Boys
- 2004 – Surf Edition for Japan
- 2002 – No Doubt About It
- 2000 – Irie Island Christmas (Compilation Album) – "Reggae Christmas"
- 2000 – Now
- 1999 – Solid

=== The Kanile‘a Collection ===
- 1994 – Nahenahe

=== Guest appearances ===
- 2010 – An ‘Ukulele Christmas (Compilation Album) – "Mele Kalikimaka/Jingle Bells" and "I Saw Mommy Kissing Santa Claus/Jingle Bell Rock"
- 2010 – Troy Fernandez – Hawaiian Style ‘Ukulele 2 – "Love and Honesty/In this Life"
- 2010 – Hailama Farden –Hawaiian Cowboy – Hailama Farden's Tribute to Uncle Sol K. Bright
- 2006 – Kawika Regidor – Growing Up
- 2006 – Bruce Shimabukuro – Incognito – "Walk Me To The Stars"
- 2004 – Mālia Ka‘ai – Leo Nahenahe – "Puamana" and "‘Ohu ‘Ohu Kahakuloa"
- 2004 – Sheraton Resort of Hawai‘i (Compilation Album) – "Sailing" and "Pretty Girl"
- 2004 – Duets – Island Style (Compilation Album) – "Your Precious Love", "Put A Little Love In Your Heart", and "Ain't Nothing Like The Real Thing"
- 2003 – Kawika Regidor – Paradise – "For Your Love", "My Only Lover," and "Aloha No Kawika"
- 2002 – Hawaiian Style 2 – Compilation Album – "Perfect Day" and "I'm a Woman"
- 2002 – Kawika Regidor – The First Time – "The First Time"
- 2002 – Norm – I Belong 2 U – "Groove Wit’cha"
- 1999 – Kanilau – Ke Ao Wena – "Beautiful Kahana"
