= Wolfgang Boss =

German producer

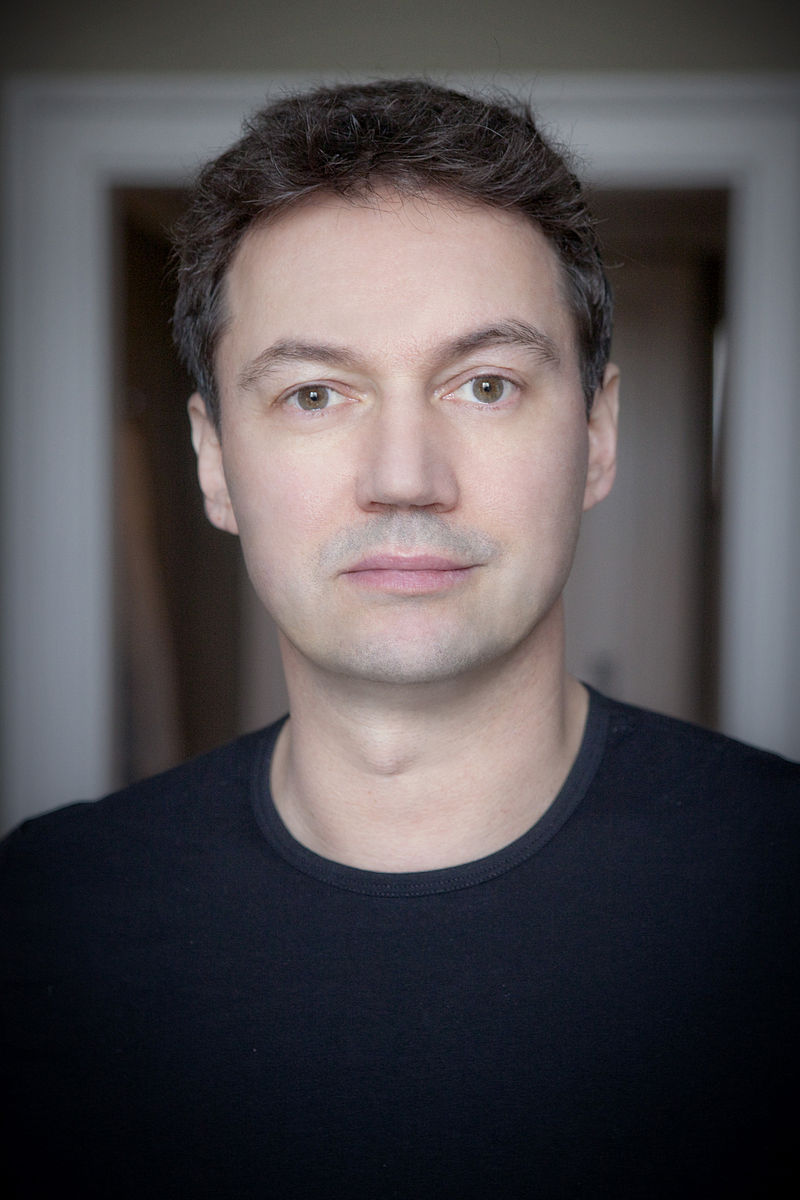
Wolfgang Boss

Wolfgang Boss is a German music executive, producer and president of A&R for Sony Music Entertainment company. Wolfgang holds the position of Sony Music's Executive President A&R globally since 2013. With more than 100 gold and platinum certifications Wolfgang Boss is one of the most successful A&R executives of the last two decades.

== Biography and musical career ==
Boss entered the music world during his university studies. After working as a DJ, he became a club manager and established his own house music club, MACH 1. This brought him into regular contact with international DJs and artists in the house scene. In 2003 his Berlin-based company Mach 1 Records GmbH became a partner in the newly founded house label, Ministry of Sound Germany. Just one year later Boss's new label MACH 1 scored two number-one hits with Dragostea Din Tei (Haiducii) and Obsessión (Aventura). The latter held the top spot on the German charts for seven weeks.

In 2005 Boss teamed up with German producer Reinhardt "Voodoo" Reith to create the music for their Crazy Frog project. The single "Axel F" by Crazy Frog became the most sold single worldwide in 2005 topping the charts in more than 30 countries.

In 2007 Boss accepted an offer from Universal Music and founded B1 Recordings as a joint venture with Universal Music Germany.

Releasing hits by artists such as Stromae (Alors on Danse), Edward Maya (Stereo Love), Pitbull (I know you want me), Lucenzo & Don Omar (Danza Kuduro) and Klingande (Jubel), B1 Recordings frequently topped the charts.

B1 Recordings' release of the single "Ai Se Eu Te Pego!" by Brazilian artist Michel Teló, which came out at the end of 2011, was a worldwide hit, reaching no 1 in Germany, Austria and Switzerland and it was the most downloaded song in Germany at the time. Two more releases of B1 are in the Top 10 of the most downloaded songs in Germany ever: Gotye's "Somebody That I Used to Know", and Israel Kamakawiwo`ole (IZ) "Over The Rainbow".

In 2014 Boss entered a long-term partnership with Sony Music Entertainment. His label B1 Recordings and Sony have since been working exclusively together on new releases. He also holds the global position of Executive Vice President A&R.

In 2019 B1 Recordings expanded its presence into new markets with France and the UK which hold their own local representative B1 label within the Sony Music structure.

With Sony Wolfgang Boss was instrumental in the signing of electronic music super star artists like Kygo, Martin Garrix and Paul Kalkbrenner and he is part of the A&R team of these artists helping them creating global hits like Garrix' 'Scared to be Lonely' and Kygo's 'Remind me to Forget'.

In 2018, B1 Recordings released the track "In My Mind" by Lithuanian Producer Dynoro which went to #1 in 13 countries – ranking Shazam's global No.1 for eight weeks – was #1 in the German charts for almost three months and 2018's most successful song. The track amassed more than 1.5 billion streams.

A year later, Boss saw another success with Grammy for Best Remixed Recording awarded hit single 'Roses (Imanbek Remix)' by US- Rapper SAINt JHN. The Remix production of Kazakhstan-based Producer Imanbek topped several Charts reaching #1 in numerous countries including UK, Ireland, Australia, Netherlands, NZ, Belgium, Hungary, Czech Republic and Slovakia. The track held the Global Shazam #1 for 13 consecutive weeks and reached Top 5 of the US BillboardHot 100. In late 2020, ‘Roses (Imanbek Remix) went on to amass 1 billion streams on Spotify and 2 billion streams across all platforms within a year of its release. By November 2024, the song surpassed 2 billion streams on Spotify, becoming one of only eight dance songs globally to achieve this milestone. In 2020, Boss released a remix cover of 'Goosebumps' by Spanish Producer HVME which claimed top global positions. The track was eventually re-released as a Joint Venture between B1 & Epic Records in early 2021 with Travis Scott as the leading artist. Both versions together have reached more than a billion streams on Spotify.

In 2022, Wolfgang Boss started working with Brazilian superstar DJ Alok and was instrumental in Alok producing several global dance hits. These include 'Deep Down' with Ella Eyre, Kenny Dope, and Never Dull, which has amassed 420 million Spotify streams by November 2024, 'Car Keys' with Ava Max (140 million Spotify streams), 'All By Myself' with Ellie Goulding and Sigala (170 million Spotify streams), 'Jungle' with The Chainsmokers and Mae Stephens, and 'Let's Get FKD UP' with Ceres, Mondello, and Tribbs (200 million Spotify streams).

To date, Boss has overseen and released a substantial body of hit singles that have collated more than 1 billion streams on Spotify alone, including: Saint Jhn - Roses (Imanbek Remix); Dynoro - In My Mind; Travis Scott X HVME - Goosebumps; Regard - Ride It; Kygo & Selena Gomez - It Ain't Me; Martin Garrix - Scared to be Lonely; Martin Garrix - In The Name Of Love; J Balvin & Willy William - Mi Gente; Gotye - Somebody that I Used To Know; Don Omar & Lucenzo - Danza Kuduro; Kygo - Firestone.

== Awards ==
At the German ECHO 2011 music awards on 25 March 2011, Boss and Jon de Mello received the Hit of the Year ECHO for Over the Rainbow by Israel Kamakawiwo’ole. The Hawaiian singer, often known simply as IZ, recorded the song three years before his death in 1997. Boss bought the rights to release the single in Europe in 2010. Over the Rainbow topped the German charts for four months in late 2010 and early 2011, selling over 800,000 copies, which made it the top-selling single of 2010 and the most downloaded song of all time in Germany at that time. The song and the corresponding album Facing Future have also enjoyed success outside Germany. In France, for example, the single reached number one and the album went platinum.

At the 2018 German Music Awards (ECHO), Wolfgang Boss once again claimed the ECHO for Hit of the Year with the single 'In My Mind' by Dynoro. Boss signed the track after its initial release as a bootleg in 2017, which had been taken down by the rights holders of the sampled recordings. He spent six months negotiating with the various rights holders, and when the track was officially re-released in June 2018, it soared to No. 1 in 13 countries, became the best-selling single in Germany that year, and, by November 2024, had amassed over 1.5 billion streams on Spotify alone.

=== KYGO ===
In 2013, Wolfgang Boss, Patrick Moxey, and Adam Granite signed Norwegian producer Kygo to Sony Music after discovering his music on SoundCloud. At the time, many of Kygo's uploads on SoundCloud were unauthorized remixes—bootlegs—of popular songs by artists like Ed Sheeran and Coldplay. Recognizing his potential, Wolfgang, Patrick, and the Sony Music A&R team collaborated with Kygo to help him create original tracks featuring unreleased songs by both Sony-signed and independent artists. This partnership led to the release of Firestone in December 2014 and Stole the Show in early 2015, both of which became massive hits. Kygo quickly rose to global fame, becoming the fastest artist in history to reach one billion streams on Spotify within just over a year. With subsequent collaborations featuring artists like Selena Gomez, Ellie Goulding, and Imagine Dragons, Kygo achieved multiple global hits and cemented his status as a global superstar.

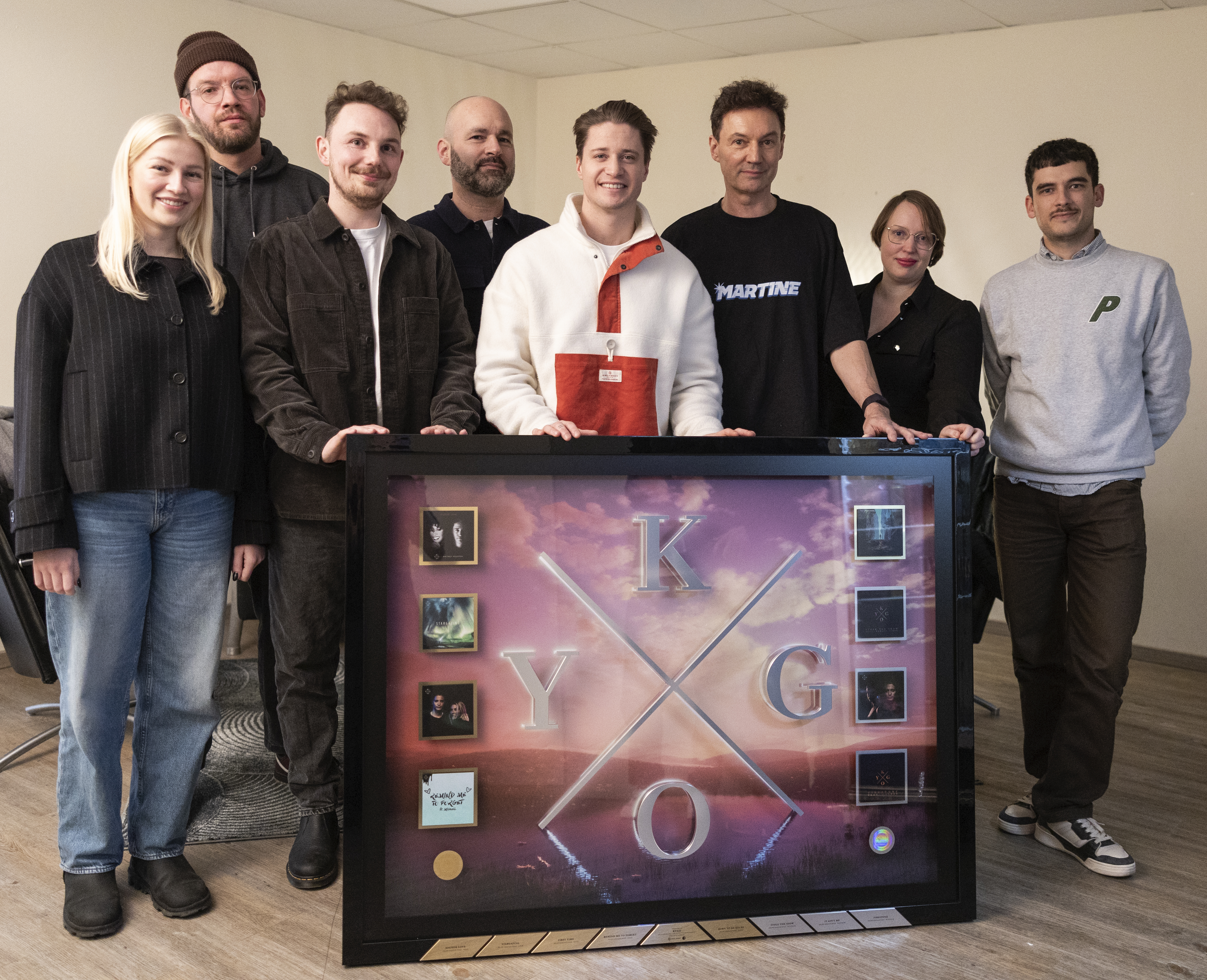
Wolfgang Boss presented a multi-platinum/gold award to Kygo.

In November 2024, Wolfgang Boss presented Kygo with a multi-platinum/gold award for sales in Germany, including three platinum certifications (Firestone, Stole the Show, and It Ain't Me) and five gold certifications (Stargazing, First Time, Remind Me to Forget, Born to Be Yours, and Higher Love).☢

PEDRO - The Raccoon

In 2024, B1 signed "Pedro," a track created by German producers Jaxomy and Agatino Romero.In under a year, the track accumulated over 50 billion views on TikTok, surpassed 350 million streams on Spotify, and reached #1 on the Spotify Global Top 50.

== Productions/releases ==
- Speedy feat. Lumidee: Sientelo, 2003 (No.2 in France, Gold Single, No.9 in Germany)
- Haiducii: Dragostea din tei, 2004 (No.1 in AUT + CH, No.2 in Germany, Platinum Single)
- Aventura: Obsessión, 2004 (No.1 in Germany, Platinum Single)
- Aventura: We Broke the Rules, 2004 (Top 10 in D, Gold Album)
- Crazy Frog: Axel F, 2005 (No.1 in 30 countries, Multi-Platinum)
- Crazy Frog: Popcorn, 2005 (No.1 in 6 countries, Platinum)
- Crazy Frog presents Crazy Hits, 2005 (Gold Album)
- Goleo presents Bob Sinclar: Love Generation, 2006 (No.1 in Germany, Platin Single)
- Pitbull: I know you want me, 2009 (Top 10 in Germany)
- Milow: Ayo Technology, 2009 (No.2 in Germany, Platinum Single)
- Milow: Milow, 2009 (No.3 in Germany, Platinum Album)
- Stromae: "Alors on danse", 2010 (No.1 in Germany, Platinum Single)
- Edward Maya: Stereo Love, 2010 (No.3 in Germany, Platinum Single)
- Israel Kamakawiwo`ole: Over the Rainbow, 2010 (No.1 in Germany, No.1 in France, Platinum Single)
- Israel Kamakawiwo`ole: Facing Future, 2010 (Platinum Album in Germany + France)
- Avicii: Penguin / Fade Into Darkness, 2011
- Milow: North & South (Album), 2011 (Gold Album)
- Lucenzo & Don Omar: Danza Kuduro, 2011 (No. 1 in Germany, Platinum Single)
- Gotye: Somebody that I used to know, 2011 (in collaboration with Vertigo Berlin)(No. 1 in Germany, Platinum Single)
- Gotye: Making mirrors, 2011 (in collaboration with Vertigo Berlin) (Gold Album)
- Michel Teló: "Ai Se Eu Te Pego!", 2011 (No. 1 in Germany, Austria + Switzerland) (No 1 selling single 2012) (Platinum)
- Gusttavo Lima : "Balada", 2012 (No.1 in Austria + Switzerland, Platinum Germany)
- Triggerfinger : "I Follow Rivers", 2012 (No.1 Austria, Platinum Germany)
- Major Lazer : Get Free, 2012
- Arash & Sean Paul : "She Makes Me Go", 2013 (Gold Single Germany)
- Wankelmut & Emma Louise : "My Head is a Jungle", (Platinum Single Italy, Top 5 UK)
- Stromae : "Papaoutai", 2013 (Gold, Germany)
- Family of the Year : "Hero", 2013 (Gold, Germany)
- Klingande : "Jubel", 2013 (6 weeks at No.1 in Germany, Platinum)
- Alle Farben: She Moves (Far Away), 2014 (Platinum Single Germany)
- Bakermat: One Day (Vandaag), 2014 (Platinum Single Germany, Gold Single France)
- Kygo: Firestone feat. Conrad Sewell, 2014 (Platinum Single in Germany)
- Kygo: Stole The Show feat. Parson James, 2015 (Platinum Single in Germany)
- Deorro: Five More Hours feat. Chris Brown (in cooperation with Ultra Music), 2015 (Gold Single in Germany, Top 10 in 10 countries, Top 40 in 40 countries)
- Paul Kalkbrenner: 7, 2015 (#1 Album in Germany, Switzerland & Austria | Gold Album in Germany)
- Anna Naklab: Supergirl feat. Alle Farben & YOUNOTUS, 2015 (Platinum Single in Germany, Gold Single in Spain)
- Sigala: Easy Love, 2015 (Gold Single in Germany)
- Sigala: Sweet Lovin', 2015 (Gold Single in Germany)
- Julian Perretta: Miracle, 2016 (Gold Single in Germany)
- Era Istrefi: Bonbon, 2016 (Gold Single in Germany)
- Alle Farben: Please Tell Rosie, 2016 (Platin Single in Germany)
- Martin Garrix feat. Bebe Rexha: In The Name Of Love, 2016 (Platinum Single in Germany)
- Alle Farben: Bad Ideas, 2016 (Platinum Single in Germany)
- Kygo & Selena Gomez: It Ain't Me, 2017 (Platinum Single in Germany)
- Martin Garrix & Dua Lipa: Scared to be Lonely, 2017 (Platinum Single in Germany)
- Alle Farben: Little Hollywood, 2017 (Platinum Single in Germany)
- Kygo & Ellie Goulding: First Time, 2017 (Gold Single in Germany)
- J Balvin & Wily William: Mi Gente, 2017 (Platinum Single in Germany)
- Martin Garrix & David Guetta: So Far Away, 2017 (Gold Single in Germany)
- Kygo & Miguel: Remind Me To Forget, 2018 (Gold Single in Germany)
- Kygo & Imagine Dragons: Born To Be Yours, 2018 (Gold Single in Germany)
- El Chombo: Dame Tu Cosita, 2018 (4.8 billion YouTube views - No.6th most viewed music video ever on YouTube)
- Dynoro & Gigi D`Agostino: In My Mind, 2018 (No.1 Germany, Austria, Switzerland, Russia, Sweden, Top 10 global Spotify charts, 2× Platinum in Germany, Single Of The Year in 2018 in Germany, Diamond Single in France)
- Alle Farben & Ilira: Fading, 2018 (Platin in Switzerland & Poland, Gold in Austria)
- Gaullin: Moonlight, 2018 (Gold Single in Germany & France)
- YouNotUs & Janieck & Senex: Narcotic, 2019 (Gold in Germany & The Netherlands)
- Gims & Maluma: Hola Senorita, 2019 (220 million Spotify streams)
- SAINt JHN - Roses (Imanbek Remix), 2019 (Diamond: Germany, France, Mexico and Poland, 8× platinum: Canada, 7× platinum: Australia, 4× platinum: Italy, 3× platinum: USA, UK, Austria, Belgium, Denmark, NZ, Portugal, Sweden, 2× platinum: Norway, Switzerland, Spain, Greece. Won the 2021 Grammy for Best Remixed Recording)
- Regard - Ride It, 2019 (Diamond: France, Poland, Mexico, 7× platinum: Australia, Canada, 3× platinum: UK, Italy, Austria, 2× platinum: Germany, Belgium, Denmark, Portugal, Switzerland, Spain, platinum: USA, NZ, Greece)
- Lucky Luke - Cooler Than Me (Gold in Germany & France), 2019
- HVME - Goosebumps, 2021 (Platinum: Germany, Brazil, Austria, Portugal, Gold: Sweden, Switzerland, Mexico, Belgium)
- Travis Scott & HVME - Goosebumps, 2021 (Diamond: France, Brazil, 2× Platinum: Australia, Canada, Poland, Spain, Platinum: UK, Mexico, Greece)
- Justin Wellington feat. Small Jam - Iko Iko (My Bestie), 2021 (Gold in Germany, 2× Platinum Austria)
- Goya Menor & Nektunez - Ameno Amapiano Remix, 2022
- southstar - Miss You, 2022 (Certified Platinum in DE & AT)
- The King Khan & BBQ Show - Love You So, 2022 (No.1 Tik Tok 2022, over 1.5 trillion TikTok views)
- Alok, Ella Eyre, Kenny Dope ft. Never Dull - Deep Down, 2022 (Certified Gold in France, Italy, Canada, Australia; Certified Silver in UK; Certified Diamond in Brazil)
- Alok, Sigala, Ellie Goulding - All By Myself, 2022 (Top 10 European Airplay Charts)
- Alok & James Arthur - Work With My Love, 2023 (Top 20 European Airplay Charts)
- Empire of the Sun & southstar - We Are The People (southstar Remix), 2023 (Certified gold in Poland and Austria)
- Creeds - Push Up, 2023 (Certified Gold in Germany, France, Italy, Netherlands, Spain, Greece, Australia; Platinum in Austria, Switzerland, Ireland, Belgium, Hungary 4x, Poland; Diamond in Turkey)
- Alok & Ava Max - Car Keys (Ayla), 2023 (Top 40 European Airplay Charts)
- cassö, Raye & D-Block Europe - Prada, 2023 (Certified Platinum in Germany and France, 4× Platinum in Switzerland, 2× Platinum in Austria)
- Alok, Mondello, CERES, Tribbs - LET’S GET FKD UP, 2023 (Top 10 Spotify Germany)
- Dimitri Vegas & Like Mike, Tiësto, Dido, W&W - Thank you, 2023 (Certified Gold in France and Austria, Platinum in Germany and Switzerland)
- Kygo & Ava Max - Whatever, 2024 (Top 3 Airplay Germany, Platinum in Switzerland)
- Jaxomy, Agatino Romero & Raffaella Carrà - Pedro, 2024 (Certified Gold in Germany, Canada, Italy, Denmark, Portugal, Switzerland, 3× Platinum in Poland, Platinum in Hungary, Spain). B1 Recordings won the European TikTok Award for The Best TikTok in Europe 2024 for the marketing campaign for the single PEDRO.
- Paul Kalkbrenner & Stromae - Que Ce Soit Clair, 2025 (Certified Gold in Belgium and France)
- oskar med k & Khalid - Nobody (Make Me Feel), 2025 (No.1 US Dance Radio)
- Paul Kalkbrenner - The Essence (Album), 2025 (Top 5 Germany, Belgium, Austria)
- Milky - Just The Way You Are, 2026 (Platinum in UK)
- The Bausa - Magnetic, 2026 (Platinum in Netherlands and Norway, Gold in Belgium)
