= Somewhere Over the Rainbow/What a Wonderful World =

Medley by Israel Kamakawiwoʻole

- Cover art of the 2010 re-release

Single by Israel Kamakawiwoʻole

from the album Ka ʻAnoʻi and Facing Future
- Released: November 23, 1990 (KʻA); November 1, 1993 (FF)
- Recorded: 1989 (KʻA); 1988 (FF)
- Genre: Hawaii; reggae; world
- Length: 5:08
- Label: Big Boy Records
- Songwriters: Harold Arlen; Yip Harburg; Bob Thiele; George David Weiss

Music video
- "Somewhere Over the Rainbow/What a Wonderful World" on YouTube

Audio sample
- file; help

"Somewhere Over the Rainbow/What a Wonderful World" (also known as "Over the Rainbow/What a Wonderful World") is a medley of "Over the Rainbow" by Judy Garland and "What a Wonderful World" by Louis Armstrong, recorded by Hawaiian singer Israel Kamakawiwoʻole. First released on the 1990 album Ka ʻAnoʻi, an acoustic rendition of the medley became notable after its release on his 1993 album Facing Future. The cut version — Over the Rainbow — was released in 2001 on the posthumous album Alone in IZ World.

The cut version became a sleeper hit, after charting across Europe in 2010 and 2011 and in the meanwhile being featured in numerous film and TV soundtracks throughout the 2000s and 2010s. In 2020, it was selected for preservation in the United States National Recording Registry by the Library of Congress as being "culturally, historically, or aesthetically significant".

The song has also gained over 1.6 billion views on YouTube.

== Recording history ==
The song was originally recorded in a spur-of-the-moment demo session in 1988. Israel called the recording studio at 3 A.M., and was given a 15-minute deadline to arrive by recording engineer Milan Bertosa. Bertosa recalled, "Israel was probably like 500 pounds. And the first thing at hand is to find something for him to sit on." The building security found Israel a large steel chair. "Then I put up some microphones, do a quick sound check, roll tape, and the first thing he does is 'Somewhere Over the Rainbow.' He played and sang, one take, and it was over."

At the time, copies of the acoustic recording were made only for Kamakawiwoʻole himself and Bertosa. The song was re-recorded the following year as an "upbeat Jawaiian version" for Kamakawiwoʻole's debut album Ka ʻAnoʻi, listed as "Over the Rainbow/What a Wonderful World." In 1993, five years after the original recording, Bertosa played the acoustic version for producer Jon de Mello while the two were completing work on Facing Future, and de Mello decided to include it on the album as "Somewhere Over the Rainbow/What a Wonderful World".

"Somewhere Over the Rainbow/What a Wonderful World" reached number 12 on Billboard's Hot Digital Tracks chart the week of January 31, 2004 (for the survey week ending January 18, 2004).

== Impact in popular culture ==
According to the Israel Kamakawiwoʻole website, Universal Studios first became interested in using the song in the movie and on the soundtrack for the 1998 film Meet Joe Black after director Martin Brest became interested in it. Kamakawiwoʻole's recording of "Somewhere Over the Rainbow/What a Wonderful World" has been used on other soundtracks as well, including the soundtracks for Finding Forrester; 50 First Dates; Fred Claus; Happy, Happy; Hubble; and The Healer. It was also featured on TV series such as ER, Charmed, Scrubs, Cold Case, the original UK version of Life on Mars, Glee, and more.

== Other cover versions ==
Other artists have recorded the medley as well. Cliff Richard recorded his own version of the medley, released as a single from the 2001 album Wanted, which peaked at number 11 on the UK Singles Chart in 2001.

== Charts ==
=== Weekly charts ===
Weekly chart performance for "Somewhere Over the Rainbow/What a Wonderful World"
Chart (2010–2011)	Peak position
Austria (Ö3 Austria Top 40)	4
Denmark (Tracklisten)	35
France (SNEP)	1
Germany (GfK)	1
Hungary (Single Top 40)	22
Luxembourg Digital Songs (Billboard)	1
Spain (Promusicae)	10
Switzerland (Schweizer Hitparade)	3
US Adult Contemporary (Billboard)	22

2025 chart performance for "Somewhere Over the Rainbow"
Chart (2025)	Peak position
Israel International Airplay (Media Forest)	5

=== Year-end charts ===
2010 year-end chart performance for "Somewhere Over the Rainbow/What a Wonderful World"
Chart (2010)	Position
Austria (Ö3 Austria Top 40)	28
France (SNEP)	16
Germany (Official German Charts)	1
Switzerland (Schweizer Hitparade)	39

2011 year-end chart performance for "Somewhere Over the Rainbow/What a Wonderful World"
Chart (2011)	Position
France (SNEP)	1
Germany (Official German Charts)	37
Switzerland (Schweizer Hitparade)	16

=== Decade-end charts ===
Decade-end chart performance for "Somewhere Over the Rainbow/What a Wonderful World"
Chart (2010–2019)	Position
Germany (Official German Charts)	16

== Certifications ==
Certifications for "Somewhere Over the Rainbow/What a Wonderful World"
Region	Certification	Certified units/sales
Austria (IFPI Austria)	Platinum	30,000^{*}
Belgium (BRMA)	Platinum	30,000^{*}
Germany (BVMI)	2× Platinum	600,000^{^}
Italy (FIMI)	Gold	25,000^{‡}
New Zealand (RMNZ)	3× Platinum	90,000^{‡}
Switzerland (IFPI Switzerland)	2× Platinum	60,000^{^}
United Kingdom (BPI)	Platinum	600,000^{‡}
United States (RIAA)	Platinum	4,200,000
^{*} Sales figures based on certification alone.^{^} Shipments figures based on certification alone.^{‡} Sales+streaming figures based on certification alone.

== See also ==
- World Digital Song Sales
