= Facing Future =

Album by Hawaiian singer Israel Kamakawiwoʻole

Studio album by Israel Kamakawiwoʻole
- Released: November 1, 1993
- Recorded: 1988, 1993
- Genres: Hawaiian; folk
- Length: 56:37
- Label: Mountain Apple
- Producers: Israel Kamakawiwo'ole; Jon de Mello

Israel Kamakawiwoʻole chronology
Ka 'Ano'i (1990)	Facing Future (1993)	E Ala E (1995)

Professional ratings
Review scores
Source	Rating
AllMusic	3/5 stars

Facing Future is the second album by Hawaiian singer Israel Kamakawiwoʻole, released in 1993. The best-selling album of all time by a Hawaiian artist, Facing Future combines traditional Hawaiian-language songs, hapa-haole songs with traditional instrumentation, Jawaiian (Island reggae) and pop music.

The album's sales have been driven not only by its popularity with Hawaiian audiences but by its popularity in the mainland United States and around the world, particularly the track "Somewhere Over the Rainbow/What a Wonderful World", which has been used in various films (Finding Forrester, Meet Joe Black, 50 First Dates, Fred Claus, Hubble, Son of the Mask), television shows (ER, Cold Case, Jon & Kate Plus 8, Life On Mars, Glee, Scrubs) and commercials (eToys). Facing Future reached platinum status in 2005.

== Track listing ==
Facing Future track listing
No.	Title	Writer(s)	Length
1.	"Hawaiʻi '78 Introduction"	Mickey Ioane	5:05
2.	"Ka Huila Wai"	Alfred Alohikea	3:18
3.	"ʻAmaʻama"	Sam Alama	2:11
4.	"Panini Pua Kea"	John Kameaaloha Almeida	3:06
5.	"Take Me Home, Country Roads (John Denver Cover)"	John Denver, Bill Danoff, Taffy Nivert	4:56
6.	"Kūhiō Bay"	Keliana Bishaw	3:29
7.	"Ka Pua Uʻi"	Bina Mossman	2:53
8.	"White Sandy Beach of Hawaiʻi"	Duc Huy	2:37
9.	"Henehene Kou ʻAka"	Traditional	4:22
10.	"Lā ʻElima"	Elizabeth Kapeka Kuahuia	3:37
11.	"Pili Me Kaʻu Manu"	Johnny Spencer	2:33
12.	"Maui Hawaiian Sup'pa Man"	Del Beazley	3:53
13.	"Kaulana Kawaihae"	Alice Na‘ai	4:03
14.	"Somewhere Over the Rainbow/What a Wonderful World (Judy Garland/Louis Armstrong Cover)"	Harold Arlen, E.Y. "Yip" Harburg / Bob Thiele, George David Weiss	5:07
15.	"Hawaiʻi '78"	Mickey Ioane	5:15
Total length:			56:37

== Personnel ==
Musicians

- Israel Kamakawiwoʻole – ukulele, vocals
- Del Beazley – guitar
- Mel Amina – guitar
- Gaylord Holomalia – keyboards, programming
- Analu ʻAina – electric bass (uncredited)
- Roland Cazimero – acoustic bass, guitar
- Mike Muldoon – percussion

Production

- Produced by Israel Kamakawiwoʻole and Jon de Mello
- Engineered and mixed by Milan Bertosa
- Mastered by Jon Golden

== Charts ==
=== Weekly charts ===
Weekly chart performance for Facing Future
Chart (2010)	Peak position
European Top 100 Albums	30
German Albums Chart	8
German Newcomer Chart	1

=== Year-end charts ===
2010 year-end chart performance for Facing Future
Chart (2010)	Rank
German Albums Chart	26

2011 year-end chart performance for Facing Future
Chart (2011)	Rank
German Albums Chart	76
Swiss Albums Chart	61

== Certifications and sales ==
Certifications and sales for Facing Future
Region	Certification	Certified units/sales
Germany (BVMI)	Platinum	500,000^{^}
Switzerland (IFPI Switzerland)	Gold	25,000^{^}
United States (RIAA)	Platinum	1,000,000^{^}
^{^} Shipments figures based on certification alone.
