= Keale =

Keale is a surname. Notable people with the surname include:

- Bill Keale, American singer-songwriter
- Moe Keale (1939–2002), American musician and actor

== See also ==
- Heale
- Keane (surname)
