= Wanted (Cliff Richard album) =

2001 studio album by Cliff Richard

Studio album by Cliff Richard
- Released: 5 November 2001 (UK)
- Recorded: January – April 2001
- Studio: Wilmer Studios
- Genre: Pop; rock
- Label: Papillon
- Producer: Alan Tarney

Cliff Richard chronology
The Whole Story: His Greatest Hits (2000)	Wanted (2001)	Cliff at Christmas (2003)

Singles from Wanted
- 1. "Somewhere Over the Rainbow/What a Wonderful World" Released: 3 December 2001; 2. "Let Me Be the One" Released: 1 April 2002

Wanted is the 34th studio album by British singer Cliff Richard, released by Papillon Records on 5 November 2001 in the United Kingdom. This album was produced by Alan Tarney who had previously worked with Richard on hits including "We Don't Talk Anymore", "Dreaming", "Wired for Sound" and "Some People". The two had not worked together since the 1989 album Stronger. Wanted reached No. 11 in the UK Albums Chart and stayed in the charts for 8 weeks.

The album is primarily made up of cover songs, including songs by artists such as Elvis Presley, The Everly Brothers, The Beatles, Carole King and Tina Turner. At the time of release the official website for the album explained that it consisted of "hits Cliff's always Wanted to record."

The inspiration for the album came when Richard was sent a copy of Israel Kamakawiwo'ole's recording of "Over the Rainbow" combined with "What a Wonderful World" weeks into the year 2000. He knew immediately he wanted to record it.

Two singles were released from this album, the first being the song "Somewhere Over the Rainbow/What a Wonderful World" which reached No. 11 in the UK Singles Chart and stayed for 6 weeks. The second single release was one of the three original songs on the album, "Let Me Be the One", which came in at No. 29. The two other original songs on the album are "Do You Wonder" and "This Love You Will Never Forget".

The album has sold over 220,000 copies worldwide.

== 2022 re-release ==
The album was remastered in 2022, alongside the singles Somewhere Over the Rainbow and Let Me Be The One for digital download.

== Track listing ==
#	Title	Time
1.	"Somewhere Over the Rainbow/What a Wonderful World"; Original singer: Judy Garland / Louis Armstrong; Writers: Harold Arlen, Yip Harburg & George David Weiss, Bob Thiele	4:47
2.	"Right Here Waiting"; Original singer: Richard Marx; Writer: Richard Marx	4:21
3.	"What's Love Got to Do with It"; Original singer: Tina Turner; Writers: Terry Britten, Graham Lyle	3:35
4.	"Let Me Be the One"; Original singer: Cliff Richard; Writer: Chris Eaton	4:05
5.	"And I Love Her"; Original singers: The Beatles; Writers: John Lennon, Paul McCartney	3:50
6.	"All Shook Up"; Original singer: Elvis Presley; Writers: Otis Blackwell, Elvis Presley	4:05
7.	"Love Me Tender"; Original singer: Elvis Presley; Writers: Elvis Presley, Vera Matson	3:53
8.	"Do You Wonder"; Original singer: Cliff Richard; Writer: Alan Tarney	4:16
9.	"You've Got a Friend"; Original singer: Carole King; Writer: Carole King	4:37
10.	"Moon River"; Original singer: Audrey Hepburn; Writer: Johnny Mercer, Henry Mancini	3:24
11.	"This Love You Will Never Forget"; Original singer: Cliff Richard; Writer: Alan Tarney, Don Black	4:32
12.	"Like Strangers"; Original singers: The Everly Brothers; Writers: Felice Bryant, Boudleaux Bryant	4:10
13.	"When You Walk in the Room"; Original singer: Jackie DeShannon; Writer: Jackie DeShannon	3:37

== Charts and certifications ==
=== Weekly charts ===
Chart (2001–03)	Peak position
Danish Albums (Hitlisten)	12
New Zealand Albums (RMNZ)	46
Scottish Albums (OCC)	22
UK Albums (OCC)	11
UK Independent Albums (OCC)	5

=== Year-end charts ===
Chart (2001)	Position
United Kingdom (OCC)	97

=== Certifications ===
Certifications for Wanted
Region	Certification	Certified units/sales
United Kingdom (BPI)	Gold	100,000^{^}
^{^} Shipments figures based on certification alone.
