= Emma Veary =

Hawaiian soprano (born c.1930)

- Born: Emma Maynon Kaipuala Veary c. 1930 (age 95–96); Territory of Hawaii
- Occupation: Singer (soprano)
- Labels: Lehua; Music of Polynesia; Mountain Apple Company

Emma Maynon Kaipuala Veary (born c. 1930) is a lyric Coloratura soprano born in Hawaii.

== Early life ==
Veary was a child prodigy, singing in church before she was old enough to go to school. Her early role models were sopranos Deanna Durbin and Jeanette MacDonald. Her parents, both of Hawaiian ancestry, encouraged her, but did not have the financial means to provide her with musical training. She was put on a career path by teacher Irmgard (Gardie) Thompson, leading to her singing on the radio and receiving favorable recognition. At age 10, she was profiled in The Honolulu Advertiser, resulting in a music scholarship at Punahou School.

During World War II, she was a USO performer while enrolled at Kamehameha School For Girls, and joined with musicians such as John Kameaaloha Almeida to entertain the troops at Hawaii military installations.

== Career ==
=== Opera training and Broadway influence ===
As a teenager, Veary was sent to New York City to be trained at Carnegie Hall as a lyric Coloratura soprano. There, she was exposed to the Broadway theatre productions of that era, and aspired to expand her repertoire to be inclusive of multiple forms of vocal expression.

Upon her return home, Veary appeared one evening a week on radio station KGMB with Andy Cummings. She enrolled at Roosevelt High School, graduating in 1949, subsequently enrolling in the University of Hawaii as a music major. In 1951, she married United States Navy aviator Robert Moss and moved with him to California. For the next several years, she raised her two daughters and performed in stage productions, occasionally returning to Hawaii. Veary divorced in 1963 and moved to New York to resume her career in stage musicals.

=== Return to Hawaii ===
In the 1960s, Veary returned to live in Hawaii, marrying local radio personality J. Akuhead Pupule, and becoming a staple in local stage productions and Waikiki hotel showrooms. In a 1966 stage production of Flower Drum Song, Veary assumed the role of Helen Chao, with James Shigeta, Miyoshi Umeki and Jack Soo reprising their movie roles. When reviewing her show at the Coral Terrace of the Halekulani on the beach at Waikiki, The Honolulu Advertiser entertainment editor Wayne Harada referred to her as, "a diamond in the proper setting". In 1980, Veary was still associated with the Halekulani and married to businessman Richard Ireland.

=== Later life and career ===
She collaborated with music entrepreneur Jack de Mello, on a number of her record albums.

Veary retired to Maui, but remains an active performer. In 2010, she gave a concert at the Baldwin Home on Maui. In 2018, she performed with Robert Cazimero in Wailea.

== Awards and recognitions ==
- 1994 – The Hawai'i Academy of Recording Arts presented her with the Lifetime Achievement Award at the Na Hoku Hanohano Awards.
- 2004 – The Emma Veary Music Scholarship was established at University of Hawaii Maui College.
- 2006 – Inducted into the Hawaiian Music Hall of Fame.

== Discography/Videography ==
Partial listing

Video

- Long Story Short with Leslie Wilcox, Emma Veary (Oct. 21, 2008} PBS Hawaii

Albums

- Emma At The Royal (1976) Lehua
- This Is Hawaii Volume III (1978) Music of Polynesia
- Jack de Mello Presents Emma: My Heart Belongs to Hawaii (1973) Music of Polynesia
- Jack de Mello Presents Emma: Here In This Enchanted Place (1973) Music of Polynesia
- Jack De Mello Presents The Best Of Emma: A Collection Of 25 Hawaiian Classics (1996) The Mountain Apple Company
