= Jon de Mello =

- Born: Honolulu, Hawaii, United States
- Genres: Hawaiian
- Instrument: Piano
- Website: mountainapplecompany.com

Jon de Mello is an American record producer, manager, composer, artist, who was born in Honolulu and raised in Waikiki, and notable for producing Israel "IZ" Kamakawiwoʻole.

== Early years ==
Jon de Mello's father was composer Jack de Mello. Jon de Mello began playing the piano at the age of five, and began learning his father's trade by sitting in on recording sessions and business meetings. His interest expanded to fine art, and he studied painting at the California College of Arts and Crafts, graduating in 1970 with a fine arts degree. When he returned to Hawaii, he continued his artistic studies at the University of Hawaiʻi while simultaneously embarking on several business ventures.

== Career ==
In 1974, de Mello started Mountain Apple Company and in 1978, signed The Brothers Cazimero as the company's first act. Since then, he has produced over 150 recording projects that range from traditional Hawaiian to contemporary Hawaiian to island music, most notably being Israel Kamakawiwoʻoleʻs multi-platinum selling Facing Future and Alone in Iz World albums. In 2002, he became the first producer from a Hawaiian record label to have achieved an RIAA certified Gold Record and 2005 achieved Platinum. He also served as an entertainment consultant to Sheraton Hotels' Pacific Division, Westin Hotels, and the SS Monterey Luxury Liner.

He worked closely in developing a CD that was nominated on the 2002 final Grammy Award ballot for "Reggae Album of the Year." In 2005, he was a part of the campaign of the creation of Grammy Award for Best Hawaiian Music Album. This category was a part of the Grammy Awards from 2005 to 2011, in which he was a part of the production of many nominated albums. The recording projects he has developed and worked with have garnered over 100 Nā Hōkū Hanohano Awards. In 2010, the song he is best known for producing, 'Over the Rainbow' won "Hit of the Year" at the German Echo Awards where Jon accepted the award on Israel "IZ" Kamakawiwoʻole's behalf.

Today, de Mello composes original music for television shows and motion pictures, produces, mixes and arranges recordings of his company's artists, designs album covers and point-of-purchase display material, and edits music videos.
