= Ka ʻAnoʻi =

Studio album by Israel Kamakawiwoʻole
- Released: November 23, 1990
- Recorded: 1989, Dolphin Sound
- Genres: Hawaiian, folk, world
- Length: 33:32
- Labels: Discos Tropical; Mountain Apple; Big Boy

Israel Kamakawiwoʻole chronology
| Ka ʻAnoʻi (1990) | Facing Future (1993) |

Professional ratings
Review scores
| Source | Rating |
|---|---|
| Allmusic | 4.5/5 stars |

Ka ʻAnoʻi (Hawaiian pronunciation: [kə ʔəˈnoʔi]; English: The Desire) is the debut album by Hawaiian singer Israel Kamakawiwoʻole.

== Production ==
The album includes an upbeat Hawaiian version of Kamakawiwoʻole's popular medley blending "Over the Rainbow" with "What a Wonderful World". This version differs from the highly regarded acoustic rendition, which had been recorded in one take in 1988. The acoustic recording "Somewhere Over the Rainbow/What a Wonderful World" went unreleased prior to the 1993 album Facing Future.

== Track listing ==
Ka ʻAnoʻi track listing
| No. | Title | Writer(s) | Length |
|---|---|---|---|
| 1. | "Margarita" | Justin B. Fawsitt | 4:25 |
| 2. | "Coney Island Washboard Woman" | | 2:08 |
| 3. | "Kainoa" | | 2:25 |
| 4. | "Ka Naʻi Aupuni" | | 3:04 |
| 5. | "I'll Be There / Warren's Song" | | 4:20 |
| 6. | "Men Who Ride Mountains" | | 3:22 |
| 7. | "Over the Rainbow / What a Wonderful World" | | 4:00 |
| 8. | "Hanohano O Cowboy" | | 2:44 |
| 9. | "Sea of Love" | | 3:02 |
| 10. | "You Don't Know Me" | | 4:02 |
| Total length: | | | 33:32 |
