= Guava Jam =

1969 studio album by the Sunday Manoa

Studio album by The Sunday Manoa
- Released: 1969
- Genre: Hawaiian folk music
- Label: Hula Records
- Producer: Don McDiarmid Jr.

The Sunday Manoa chronology
Hawaiian Time	Guava Jam	Crack Seed

Guava Jam: Contemporary Hawaiian Folk Music is a record by The Sunday Manoa, of Hawaiian folk music, released in 1969, advancing the Second Hawaiian Renaissance in the 1970s. The Sunday Manoa consisted of Peter Moon and the brothers Robert and Roland Cazimero.

== Track listing ==
1. "Kawika" (a mele inoa) - (4:55)
2. "Only You" (Paul Meheula) - (3:51)
3. "Heha Wai'pi'o" - (3:05)
4. "Kaulana 'O Waimanalo" (Sam Naeole) - (2:54)
5. "Ka'ililauokekoa" (Henry Waiau) - (3:10)
6. "Mehameha" (Rick Bibbs, Peter Moon; English translation by Alice Namakelua) - (2:52)
7. "He Hawai'i Au" (Ron Rosha, Peter Moon; English translation by Alice Namakelua)- (3:45)
8. "Maika'i Ka Makani O Kohala" (W.J. Sheldon) - (3:40)
9. "Ka La'i 'Opua" - (2:25)
10. "Poli Pumehana" (J. Kaahiki) - (2:43)
11. "Guava Jam" - (2:15)

== Personnel ==
- Peter Moon - pahu, kālaʻau, ʻukulele, tiple, vocals, slack-key guitar, requinta (a small, antique guitar design of Spanish origin)
- Robert Cazimero - ʻulīʻulī, ipu, bass guitar, vocals, ʻukulele
- Roland Cazimero - guitar, ʻiliʻili, 12 string guitar, vocals, bass guitar
- Don McDiarmid Jr. - producer (son of Hawaiian musician Don McDiarmid Sr.)
- Ron Rosha - narration on "Maika'i Ka Makani O Kohala"

== Liner notes ==
Comments by Moon for the track "Guava Jam": "The Sunday Manoa breathes new life into the music of the past, enhancing the flavor of old with the influences of today. Guava Jam means that true Hawaiian music is definitely a local product, and is disciplined and rich with feeling as any other folk music."
