= Kaleohano =

Kaleohano, a name meaning the voice (of) authority and respect, is the title of a song written by Louis "Moon" Kauakahi. The song has been performed by Israel Kamakawiwoʻole and by the Mākaha Sons of Niʻihau. The song was written as a tribute to Richard Kuakini "Piggy" Kaleohano, a musician and sound man who lived on Hawaiian homestead land in Keaukaha, and was a pillar of the native community there.
