= Mike Rich =

Screenwriter and radio commentator

- Born: Enterprise, Oregon, U.S.

Michael A. Rich is an American screenwriter best known for his writing on sports-related films.

== Early life ==
Rich was born in Enterprise, Oregon. He attended Oregon State University and was a member of Sigma Phi Epsilon fraternity.

While in college at Oregon State University he worked as a disc jockey and newsman at the radio stations KFLY and KEJO in Corvallis, Oregon. At that time, KFLY was on the AM broadcasting frequency of 1240 kHz, and KEJO was on the FM broadcasting frequency of 101.5 MHz; both stations were licensed to serve Corvallis, were located in the same building, and owned by Madgekal Broadcasting, Inc., which was controlled by Corvallis businessman Mario Pastega.

A graduate of Oregon State University's College of Business, Rich began his media career as a news reporter for Portland radio station KINK. He transitioned in 2001 from full time at KINK to morning updates while pursuing a screenwriter career. In 1998, he was awarded a Nicholl Fellowship in Screenwriting by the Academy of Motion Picture Arts and Sciences for his first film script Finding Forrester. This film was named after his high school English teacher, Mrs. Forster, from Enterprise High School in Enterprise, Oregon. He was awarded an honorary dFA by OSU on June 17, 2007, for his acclaim earned by his first two movies.

== Filmography ==
- Finding Forrester (2000)
- The Rookie (2002)
- Radio (2003)
- Miracle (uncredited) (2004)
- Invincible (uncredited) (2006)
- The Nativity Story (2006)
- Secretariat (2010)
- Cars 3 (2017)
