= Alone in IZ World =

Compilation album by Israel Kamakawiwoʻole
- Released: September 18, 2001
- Recorded: 1995–1997
- Genre: Hawaiian, folk
- Length: 52:25
- Language: English and Hawaiian
- Label: Mountain Apple Company
- Producer: Jon de Mello

Israel Kamakawiwoʻole chronology
Iz in Concert: The Man and His Music (1996)	Alone in IZ World (2001)	Wonderful World (2007)

Professional ratings
Review scores
Source	Rating
Allmusic	4.5/5 stars

Alone in IZ World is an album by the Hawaiian musician Israel Kamakawiwoʻole released in 2001, 4 years after his death in 1997. The album has charted on several of Billboard’s album charts. These are:

- Top Independent Albums (47 weeks on the chart between 2001 and 2003, peaking at #6)
- Top World Albums chart, peaking at number 1 (104 weeks on the chart between 2001 and 2003, peaking at #1)
- The Billboard 200 (5 weeks on the chart between 2001 and 2002 peaking at #135)
- Top Internet Albums (3 weeks on the chart in 2002)

The album also charted in the top 5 of the year-end Top World Catalog Albums chart in 2006 (#2), 2007 (#3), and 2008 (#5).

== Track listing ==
Alone in IZ World track listing
No.	Title	Length
1.	"Mona Lisa"	2:00
2.	"Kaleohano"	3:42
3.	"ʻŪlili Ē"	2:50
4.	"Hanohano Wale Nō Nā Cowboy and Ka Huila Wai"	4:16
5.	"Hiʻilawe"	4:42
6.	"Henehene Kou ʻAka"	4:23
7.	"Ahi Wela / Twinkle Twinkle Little Star"	3:45
8.	"ʻŌpae Ē"	4:02
9.	"Starting All Over Again"	5:44
10.	"Over the Rainbow"	3:31
11.	"Panini Pua Kea"	3:07
12.	"Lā ʻElima"	3:38
13.	"In This Life"	5:10
Total length:		50:50

Some versions of the album have a bonus fourteenth track, called "Iz Talks About Oxygen".

== Certifications ==
Region	Certification	Certified units/sales
Portugal (AFP)	4× Platinum	160,000^{^}
United States (RIAA)	Gold	500,000^{^}
^{^} Shipments figures based on certification alone.
