= Bill Keale =

Hawaiian-American singer-songwriter

- Born: Oahu, Hawaii
- Origin: Niihau, Hawaii
- Genres: Hawaiian; Folk; Pop
- Occupation: Musician
- Instruments: Guitar; Ukulele
- Years active: 1970-present
- Label: Twin Island Music ;
- Website: Official website

William Gregory Keale is a Hawaiian-American singer-songwriter from Kailua, Oahu. He is best known as Israel Kamakawiwoʻole's cousin.

== Personal life ==
Keale was born on Oahu, Hawaii. He grew up to love Hawaiian music, and was raised by Hawaiian musicians, and spent a lot of time with his uncle Moe Keale, a ukulele virtuoso. His cousin, Kamakawiwoʻole, once told him that the "music is in the bones."

Bill Keale was a former member of the Bill Gregory and Company band, and is one of the few people today to have been born in the 20th century with pure Hawaiian ancestry. Today he has a wife named Tiffany and two kids, Mac and Rosie Keale.

== Musical career ==
Bill Keale's first album, "Islands Away," was released in 1999. His albums feature lyrics in Hawaiian and English. Some of his best-known songs are "After The Rain" from the album of the same name, "Kai'lua Rain," "Ala Ka'i," and his rendition of "Somewhere Over The Rainbow/What a Wonderful World." His albums "Keeper of The Rain" and "After The Rain" were both released on the same day, in July 2002. He also released a Christmas album titled "The Magic of Christmas" in 2006.

Keale has released 7 studio albums, one EP, and a Christmas album. Although he has not released any new music since 2013, he is still active. His albums have received generally positive reviews.

== Discography ==
Album name	Release date	Record label
"Islands Away"	January 5, 1999	Twin Island
"America: Home of The Beautiful" (EP)	July 17, 2001	Twin Island
"Keeper of The Rain"	July 15, 2002	Twin Island
"After The Rain"	July 15, 2002	CD Baby/Twin Island
"By Request"	February 4, 2005	Twin Island
"The Magic of Christmas"	November 27, 2006	Twin Island
"With Aloha"	January 1, 2008	CD Baby/Twin Island
"Yesterday"	March 2, 2010	Twin Island
"What a Wonderful World"	May 20, 2013	Twin Island
