= Finding Forrester =

2000 American drama film by Gus Van Sant

- Theatrical release poster
- Directed by: Gus Van Sant
- Written by: Mike Rich
- Produced by: Sean Connery; Laurence Mark; Rhonda Tollefson
- Starring: Sean Connery; F. Murray Abraham; Anna Paquin; Busta Rhymes; Rob Brown
- Cinematography: Harris Savides
- Edited by: Valdís Óskarsdóttir
- Music by: Bill Frisell
- Production companies: Columbia Pictures; Laurence Mark Productions; Fountainbridge Films
- Distributed by: Sony Pictures Releasing
- Release dates: December 20, 2000 (limited); January 12, 2001 (wide)
- Running time: 136 minutes
- Country: United States
- Language: English
- Budget: $43 million
- Box office: $80 million

Finding Forrester is a 2000 American drama film directed by Gus Van Sant and written by Mike Rich. In the film, a teenager, Jamal Wallace (Rob Brown), is invited to attend a prestigious private high school. By chance, Jamal befriends a reclusive writer, William Forrester (Sean Connery), through whom he refines his talent for writing and comes to terms with his identity. Anna Paquin, F. Murray Abraham, Michael Pitt, Glenn Fitzgerald, April Grace, Busta Rhymes, and Charles Bernstein star in supporting roles.

Finding Forrester had a limited release on December 20, 2000 before a wide release by Sony Pictures Releasing on January 12, 2001. The film received positive reviews from critics and grossed $80 million against a $43 million budget. Although the film is not based on a true story, film critics have compared the character portrayed by Connery with real-life writer J. D. Salinger. Connery later acknowledged that the inspiration for his role was indeed Salinger.

== Plot ==
In the Bronx, sixteen-year-old Jamal Wallace downplays his potential as a gifted student, preferring to play basketball with his friends. They are watched by William Forrester, a recluse who never leaves his apartment and has become a neighborhood urban legend. Dared by his friends, Jamal sneaks into the apartment, but is surprised by Forrester and flees, leaving his backpack behind. Forrester later drops the backpack onto the street, having edited Jamal's personal writings. Jamal asks him to read more of his writing, but Forrester angrily tells him to begin with 5,000 words on why he should "stay the fuck out of my home." Jamal does so, leaving the essay on Forrester's doorstep, and is invited inside.

Due to his high test scores, Jamal is offered a full academic scholarship and transfers to Mailor-Callow, a prestigious Manhattan private school, with the understanding that he will join the basketball team. Jamal learns that Forrester is the Pulitzer Prize-winning author of a famous novel, Avalon Landing, but never published another book. Forrester agrees to help Jamal with his writing as long as he does not ask about Forrester's life or tell anyone about him. They bond as Forrester gives Jamal his own work to rewrite, on the condition that their writing never leaves the apartment. Jamal's writing improves, leading one of his professors, Robert Crawford, to suspect him of plagiarism.

Jamal befriends his classmate Claire and excels on the basketball court, but is alienated from his old friends. He convinces Forrester to attend a game with him at Madison Square Garden, but they become separated and Forrester, overwhelmed by the crowd, has an anxiety attack. With his brother Terrell's help, Jamal takes Forrester onto the empty field at Yankee Stadium, where an emotional Forrester reveals he often came with his brother. He tells Jamal about his brother's trauma returning home from World War II—the basis for his book—and how Forrester's indirect role in his death, followed by the deaths of their parents, led him to become a recluse.

Still suspicious, Crawford forces Jamal to complete his next assignment in his presence. Running out of time to enter the school's essay competition, Jamal submits one of Forrester's exercises to the contest, and humiliates Crawford during class. He is called before Crawford and the school board, who reveal that Forrester had published the article upon which Jamal based his essay. Asked to prove he had the author's permission to use his material, Jamal keeps his promise to Forrester and says nothing. Crawford demands he read a letter of apology to his classmates, but Jamal refuses, endangering his scholarship. Telling Forrester what he has done, Jamal asks his friend to defend him, but Forrester is angry Jamal betrayed his trust by taking their writing, and is still unwilling to leave his home.

The school assures Jamal that the plagiarism charges will be dropped if he wins the state basketball tournament, but he misses the final free throws, costing them the championship. After watching the game on TV, Forrester manages to ride his bicycle through the city. Terrell gives him a letter from Jamal, who arrives at school for the essay contest. Forrester appears and reads a heartfelt essay to the captive audience. He acknowledges his friendship with Jamal, who he explains had his blessing to use his material, but Crawford declares that this will not influence the school's decision. Forrester reveals that the essay he recited was actually the letter Jamal had written, and the headmaster overrules Crawford and clears Jamal's name. Jamal leaves with Forrester, who plans to visit his native Scotland. Just before leaving, Forrester asks Jamal if he'd deliberately missed the winning free-throws in the championship game, but Jamal only answers with a smile.

One year later, Jamal is preparing to graduate from Mailor-Callow. He meets with Sanderson, an attorney, who explains that Forrester has died, having been diagnosed with cancer before he met Jamal. Forrester has bequeathed his apartment and all other belongings to Jamal, with a letter encouraging him to pursue his dreams and thanking him for rekindling his desire to live. Jamal is also given the manuscript of Forrester's second novel, for which he is expected to write the foreword, and his old friends comfort him by inviting him to play a basketball game.

== Cast ==
- Sean Connery as William Forrester
- Rob Brown as Jamal Wallace
- F. Murray Abraham as Robert Crawford
- Anna Paquin as Claire
- Busta Rhymes as Terrell Wallace
- April Grace as Ms. Joyce
- Michael Pitt as Coleridge
- Michael Nouri as Dr. Spence
- Matt Damon as Steve Sanderson
- Gerry Rosenthal as Student Speaker
- Glenn Fitzgerald as Massie
- Alison Folland as Jeopardy Contestant
- Alex Trebek as himself

== Production ==
Principal photography was shot entirely in Manhattan, the Bronx, and Brooklyn (many Mailor Academy scenes were filmed at Regis High School on the Upper East Side of Manhattan), with some scenery and pick-up shots made in suburban Toronto, Ontario, Canada, during post-production. Parts of the film were also shot in Hamilton, Ontario.

Connery became interested in the movie thanks to his friend John Calley, who was an executive at Sony Pictures, and Connery in turn invited Gus Van Sant to act as director. After that, Connery, Van Sant, and Rich together rewrote the original script of Rich. Connery also brought a few of his personal habits to the role, like wearing his socks inside out.

Rob Brown auditioned for the film, hoping to make enough money to pay his $300 cell phone bill. Van Sant had him read a second time and then cast him as one of the leads. According to Connery, the strongest feature of Brown as an actor was his natural and confident behavior in front of the camera.

Before Connery was cast as William Forrester, Bill Murray was considered for the role. Connery drew inspiration for his portrayal of Forrester from the biographies of J. D. Salinger and William S. Burroughs.

== Reception ==
=== Box office ===
The film received limited release on December 20, 2000, in 200 theaters, grossing US$701,207 in the opening weekend. It later received commercial release where it opened at #1 in theaters in 2001, grossing US$11,112,139 in the opening weekend. It went on to gross US$51,804,714 in the United States and Canada and US$28,245,050 elsewhere for a worldwide total of US$80,049,764.

=== Critical response ===
Upon its initial release, Finding Forrester received generally positive reviews. It garnered two thumbs up from Roger Ebert and Richard Roeper, with Roeper considering it one of the 10 best films of the year. In late 2009, Roeper included the film at number 64 on his list of the 100 best movies of the decade.

The review aggregation website Rotten Tomatoes gave the film a score of 74%, based on reviews from 129 critics, with an average score of 6.50/10. The site's consensus states: "Despite the predictability of its plot and its similarity to Good Will Hunting, Finding Forrester has an honest, solid feel to it and good rapport between Connery and Brown." Metacritic, which assigns a weighted average score out of 100 to reviews from mainstream critics, gives the film a score of 62, based on 27 reviews. CinemaScore reported that audiences gave the film a rare "A+" grade.

=== "You're the man now, dog!" ===
The YTMND website originated in 2003 from creator Max Goldberg's original website, "yourethemannowdog.com", which he registered after seeing a trailer for Finding Forrester in which Connery says the line.

== Soundtrack ==
No.	Title	Writer(s)	Length
1.	"Recollections"	Billy Cobham, Chick Corea, Miles Davis, Jack DeJohnette, Dave Holland, John McLaughlin, Wayne Shorter, Joe Zawinul
2.	"Little Church"	Chick Corea, Miles Davis, Jack DeJohnette, Steve Grossman, Herbie Hancock, Dave Holland, Keith Jarrett, John McLaughlin
3.	"Black Satin"	David Creamer, Miles Davis, Jack DeJohnette, Herbie Hancock, James Mtume, Badal Roy, Collin Walcott
4.	"Under a Golden Sky"	Bill Frisell
5.	"Happy House"	Ed Blackwell, Bobby Bradford, Don Cherry, Ornette Coleman, Charlie Haden, Billy Higgins, Dewey Redman
6.	"Over the Rainbow (Photo Book)"	Bill Frisell
7.	"Lonely Fire [Excerpt]"	Chick Corea, Miles Davis, Dave Holland, Bennie Maupin, John McLaughlin, Wayne Shorter, Joe Zawinul
8.	"Over the Rainbow/What a Wonderful World"	Israel Kamakawiwo'ole
9.	"Vonetta"	Ron Carter, Miles Davis, Herbie Hancock, Wayne Shorter, Tony Williams
10.	"Coffaro's Theme"	Curtis Fowlkes, Bill Frisell, Eyvind Kang, Ron Miles
11.	"Foreigner in a Free Land"	Ornette Coleman, The London Symphony Orchestra, David Measham
12.	"Beautiful E."	Joey Baron, Kermit Driscoll, Bill Frisell, Hank Roberts
13.	"In a Silent Way [DJ Cam Remix]"	Miles Davis

"Coffaro's Theme" was originally composed as part of the soundtrack of a successful Italian movie, La scuola.

The film's score was composed by Bill Frisell.

The song "Gassenhauer", from Schulwerk by Carl Orff and arranged and produced by Bill Brown is a notable track that appears in the actual film but was not included on the soundtrack. It is played during Forrester's bike ride.

== Novelization ==
- Finding Forrester: A Novel by James Ellison, Mike Rich (Screenplay by). 2000. ISBN 9781557044792

== Television adaptation ==
In November 2020, it was reported that NBC was developing a television series adaptation of the film. The series will be produced by Stephen Curry's Unanimous Media and Sony Pictures Television with TJ Brady and Rasheed Newson as executive producers and writer and Tim Story as director.

== See also ==
- List of basketball films
- Drama films of the 2000s
- In Our Prime
- YTMND
