= 50 First Dates =

2004 American romantic comedy film by Peter Segal

- Theatrical release poster
- Directed by: Peter Segal
- Written by: George Wing
- Produced by: Jack Giarraputo; Steve Golin; Nancy Juvonen
- Starring: Adam Sandler; Drew Barrymore; Rob Schneider; Sean Astin; Dan Aykroyd
- Cinematography: Jack N. Green
- Edited by: Jeff Gourson
- Music by: Teddy Castellucci
- Production companies: Columbia Pictures; Happy Madison Productions; Anonymous Content; Flower Films
- Distributed by: Sony Pictures Releasing
- Release date: February 13, 2004
- Running time: 99 minutes
- Country: United States
- Language: English
- Budget: $75 million
- Box office: $198.5 million

50 First Dates is a 2004 American romantic comedy film directed by Peter Segal and starring Adam Sandler and Drew Barrymore, with Rob Schneider, Sean Astin, Lusia Strus, Blake Clark, and Dan Aykroyd in supporting roles. It follows the story of Henry Roth, a womanizing marine veterinarian who falls for an art teacher named Lucy Whitmore. When he discovers she has amnesia, and forgets him when she falls asleep, he resolves to win her over again each new day.

Most of the film was shot on location in Oahu, Hawaii, on the Windward side and the North Shore. Sandler and Barrymore won an MTV Movie Award for Best On-Screen Team.

The film received mixed reviews but was a commercial success. It was later remade in India as Satyabhama (2007, in Telugu) and as Ormayundo Ee Mukham (2014, in Malayalam), in Japan as 50 First Kisses (2018), in Iran as Chap dast (2005), in Mexico as Como si fuera la primera vez (2019) and in Thailand as Henry's First Dates (2026).

The film marked the second collaboration between Sandler and Barrymore, after The Wedding Singer and before Blended (both directed by Frank Coraci). During the end credits, it featured a dedication to the memory of Sandler's father Stanley, who had died at the age of 68 from lung cancer on September 9, 2003.

== Plot ==
Dr. Henry Roth, a marine veterinarian at Sea Life Park Hawaii on Oahu, only dates tourists to avoid any serious commitments. His closest friends are Ula, a marijuana-smoking Islander; Alexa, his androgynous assistant; Willy, his pet African penguin; and Jocko, a walrus that lives at the park.

One day, Henry's boat breaks down, and while waiting for the Coast Guard at the Hukilau Café, he encounters art teacher Lucy Whitmore constructing architectural art with her waffles. Assuming she is a local, which prevents him from introducing himself, he unsuccessfully attempts to return to his womanizing routine. The next day, he returns to the café and re-encounters Lucy; they instantly connect over breakfast and Lucy offers to meet him again for breakfast the next morning.

The next day, Lucy shows no recollection of ever meeting him. The restaurant owner Sue explains to Henry that the year before, Lucy and her widowed father Marlin traveled to the North Shore to pick a pineapple for his birthday. While they were returning, a cow wandered through a broken fence and onto the road, and the ensuing car crash resulted in Lucy being diagnosed with Goldfield's syndrome, a fictional form of anterograde amnesia, whereby she remembers everything up until the night before the crash. Although Lucy's short-term memory functions normally during the day, that day's experiences are lost when she sleeps, and she wakes up every morning thinking that it is Sunday, October 13. To spare her from the trauma of her condition, Marlin and Doug, Lucy's steroid-addicted brother, re-enact Marlin's birthday daily.

Despite Sue's warning, Henry attempts to get Lucy to have breakfast with him several times, but when he unintentionally offends her one-day he follows her home to apologize. There he meets Marlin and Doug, who instruct him to not speak to Lucy at breakfast. Heeding Marlin's specific orders to avoid the café, Henry arranges various daily schemes to meet Lucy on the road, most of the time managing to successfully impress her over multiple "first" dates and "chance" encounters. Later, Marlin and Doug permit Henry to continue encountering her when they discover Lucy regularly singing the Beach Boys' "Wouldn't It Be Nice" in her painting studio just on the days Henry managed to meet her, the first major change in her routine since the crash.

One day at breakfast, Lucy notices a police officer writing a ticket because of her expired license plates. With the ruse exposed, she is distressed to learn that her friends and family have maintained the charade for so long. However, while analyzing her reaction, Henry surmises that her strongest reactions are to feeling betrayed by her loved ones, rather than the actual memory loss. He devises a new strategy to let her know the truth by creating a video with her friends to calmly explain the situation and, rather than continuing her pre-crash routine, they plant the video in her room with a note to play it upon awakening. The strategy succeeds, allowing Lucy to emotionally process her situation and simultaneously be updated on current events, including her relationship with Henry. The couple's relationship blossoms via this method, with Lucy enjoying every "first kiss", and they continue to refine the process while enduring some humorous setbacks. When Lucy eventually discovers that Henry has abandoned 10 years of planning for his research study of walruses in Bristol Bay to help her manage her condition, she decides that they need to end their romantic relationship and breaks up with him. He reluctantly helps her destroy her journal entries about their time together, effectively erasing it from her memory.

Weeks later, as Henry prepares to leave for his research study, Marlin informs him that Lucy is teaching an art class at a brain-injury institute. As a parting gift, he gives Henry a Beach Boys CD; and as Henry pilots the boat and cries while listening to the CD he suddenly realizes that, since Lucy only sang "Wouldn't It Be Nice" on days when they "met", Marlin's gift may be his way of hinting that Lucy had new learned memory retention. Henry hurries to Lucy's class, but despite not remembering him she happily reveals that she dreams of him nightly, and shows him dozens of portraits that she has painted of him, and they reconcile. Sometime later, she awakens and plays the tape marked "Good Morning Lucy", which now ends with her and Henry's wedding. Henry tells her on the tape that she is on his boat, and to put on a coat because it's cold outside. She is amazed to view glaciers through the porthole, and goes up on deck where she sees her father fishing, once again meets Henry, and joyfully embraces their young daughter, Nicole.

== Cast ==
- Adam Sandler as Henry Roth, a marine veterinarian with a habit of wooing women and a fear of commitment.
- Drew Barrymore as Lucy Whitmore, Henry's love interest with anterograde amnesia.
- Rob Schneider as Ula, Henry's marijuana-smoking, wealthy native Hawaiian assistant and best friend; who is unhappily married to an overweight native woman and has five young, athletically talented children.
- Sean Astin as Doug Whitmore, Lucy's older brother, a lisping, steroid-dependent bodybuilder.
- Blake Clark as Marlin Whitmore, Lucy's widowed father, a professional fisherman.
- Lusia Strus as Alexa, Henry's ambiguously gendered Eastern European assistant.
- Dan Aykroyd as Dr. Joseph Keats, a physician specializing in brain disorders.
- Amy Hill as Sue, the Hukilau café manager and friend of Lucy and her late mother.
- Pomaika'i Brown as Nick, the Hukilau café chef and Sue's husband.
- Allen Covert as Ten-Second Tom, a hospital patient with severe memory impairment.
- Missi Pyle as Noreen, a tax attorney Henry meets at a bar but then tries to fix up with Alexa. (uncredited)
- Maya Rudolph as Stacy, pregnant friend of Lucy's at the beach party.
- Lynn Collins as Linda
- Kevin James as factory worker
- Sivuqaq as Jocko, a park walrus and one of Henry's animal friends.

== Production ==
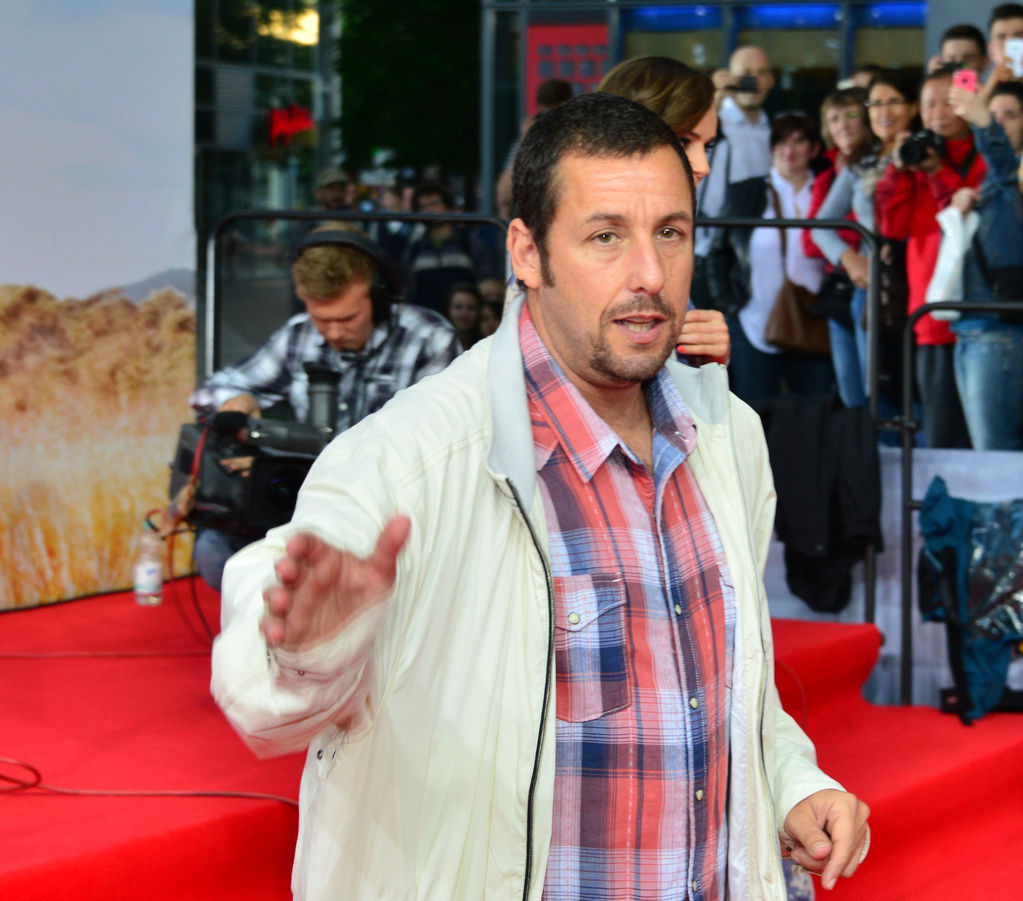
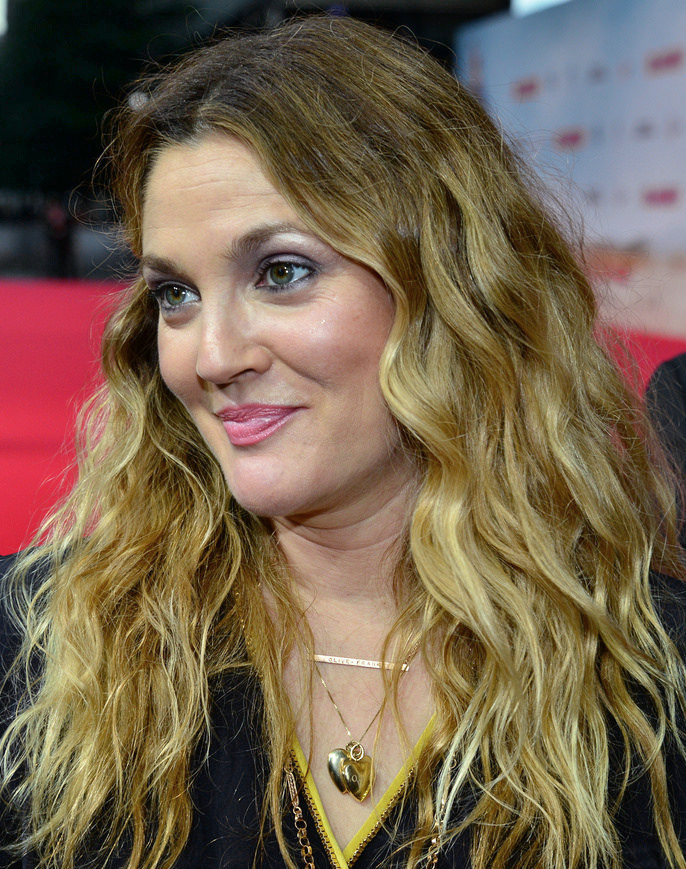
50 First Dates is the second film in which Sandler and Barrymore, both pictured in 2014, appear together. The Wedding Singer (1998) was their first collaboration, and their third was the 2014 film Blended.

On October 29, 2002, Variety reported that Columbia Pictures had bought a spec script from screenwriter George Wing, titled Fifty First Kisses, with Adam Sandler and Drew Barrymore originally in negotiations to star in the lead roles. Barrymore was sold on the script and wrote Sandler a letter suggesting it as their next film together since The Wedding Singer. Sandler joined the cast in December 2002, and was announced as co-producer under his film studio Happy Madison Productions along with Steve Golin's Anonymous Content. Sandler then recommended the script to director Peter Segal while they were working post-production on Anger Management. Segal agreed to direct, leaving him with only two days of break from work before filming. Segal revealed that the studio had changed the original title to 50 First Dates because "marketing found that the term 'kisses' was turning off guys".

While the script is primarily credited to George Wing, Lowell Ganz, Babaloo Mandel, Tim Herlihy, and Allen Covert did uncredited rewrites on it as well. Adam Sandler had also reworked the script, significantly transforming its genre from drama to comedy. Additional changes Sandler made to the script include moving its setting from Seattle to Hawaii and rewriting a decent amount of interior scenes that take place in a café. Director Peter Segal felt that these scenes were "very claustrophobic" as well as derivative of My Dinner with Andre, encouraging Sandler to rewrite these and move the location to the Kualoa Ranch. Sandler said that shooting in Hawaii "just seemed like the very best possible place to do it for many different reasons. You don't see many movies [set] there, so it was a great experience to film in a different locale. And it is such a spectacularly beautiful place for a romantic comedy."

Most of the film was shot on location in Kaneohe, Kaʻaʻawa, Wahiawa, Makapuʻu, Waimānalo, and Honolulu, as well as in Kāneʻohe Bay in 2003. The Hukilau Cafe where Drew Barrymore and Adam Sandler had breakfast each morning is still standing in Laie, Hawaii. The opening credit scene of Hawaii is Chinaman's hat, a popular destination in itself. The road they drive on each day is located in Ka’a’awa Valley, popular filming location within Kualoa Ranch and is viewable through film site tour provided by the estate. The estate also sells merchandise related to this movie and other movies filmed there. Due to the high cost of filming outside of the studio zone, some interior scenes (such as inside the Whitmore residence) were shot on sets in Los Angeles decorated to look like they were in Hawaii. Additionally, several animal and aquarium interior scenes—including those set in the walrus habitat and underwater shark tunnel—were filmed on location at Six Flags Marine World (now Six Flags Discovery Kingdom) in Vallejo, California.

== Soundtrack ==
50 First Dates: Love songs from the Original Motion Picture

Soundtrack album by various artists
- Released: February 3, 2004
- Genres: Ska; reggae; new wave
- Length: 49:37
- Label: Maverick
- Producer: Nick Hexum

The soundtrack contains cover versions of songs that were originally recorded in the 1980s and 1990s. This includes mostly reggae-style covers. It was a moderate commercial hit, reaching number 30 on the Billboard 200 and number 1 on the Top Soundtracks chart and Top Reggae Albums chart in the United States.

Despite being prominently featured in the film, neither the Beach Boys' 1966 "Wouldn't It Be Nice" nor Israel Kamakawiwoʻole's 1990 "Somewhere Over the Rainbow/What a Wonderful World" was included on the soundtrack.

The soundtrack was produced by 311's frontman, Nick Hexum. 311 provided a cover of the Cure's "Lovesong" for the soundtrack. It is heard over the film's end credits.

| No. | Title | Writer(s) | Artist | Length |
|---|---|---|---|---|
| 1. | "Hold Me Now" (Thompson Twins) | Tom Bailey, Alannah Currie, Joe Leeway | Wayne Wonder | 4:12 |
| 2. | "Love Song" (The Cure) | Robert Smith, Simon Gallup, Pearl Thompson, Boris Williams, Roger O'Donnell | 311 | 3:28 |
| 3. | "Lips Like Sugar" (Echo & the Bunnymen) | Will Sergeant, Ian McCulloch, Les Pattinson | Seal featuring Mikey Dread | 5:00 |
| 4. | "Your Love (L.O.V.E. Reggae Mix)" (The Outfield) | John Spinks | Wyclef Jean featuring Eve | 4:13 |
| 5. | "Drive" (The Cars) | Ric Ocasek | Ziggy Marley of Ziggy Marley and the Melody Makers | 4:26 |
| 6. | "True" (Spandau Ballet) | Gary Kemp | will.i.am and Fergie of Black Eyed Peas | 3:47 |
| 7. | "Slave to Love" (Bryan Ferry) | Ferry | Elan Atias featuring Gwen Stefani of No Doubt | 4:24 |
| 8. | "Every Breath You Take" (The Police) | Sting | UB40 | 3:55 |
| 9. | "Ghost in You" (The Psychedelic Furs) | Richard Butler, Tim Butler | Mark McGrath of Sugar Ray | 4:24 |
| 10. | "Friday, I'm in Love" (The Cure) | Smith, Gallup, Thompson, Williams, Perry Bamonte | Dryden Mitchell of Alien Ant Farm | 3:01 |
| 11. | "Breakfast in Bed" (Dusty Springfield in 1969; UB40/Chrissie Hynde in 1988) | Eddie Hinton, Donnie Fritts | Nicole Kea (Nicole Scherzinger of The Pussycat Dolls) | 3:22 |
| 12. | "I Melt with You" (Modern English) | Robbie Grey, Gary McDowell, Stephen Walker, Michael Conroy, Richard Brown | Jason Mraz | 3:36 |
| 13. | "Forgetful Lucy" | Sandler, Allen Covert, Tim Herlihy | Adam Sandler | 1:53 |
| Total length: | | | | 49:37 |

Other songs in the film

- The Beach Boys – "Wouldn't It Be Nice"
- The Cure – "Boys Don't Cry"
- The Beat – "Hands Off She's Mine"
- The Flaming Lips – "Do You Realize??"
- Wyclef Jean – "Baby"
- Israel Kamakawiwoʻole – "Somewhere Over the Rainbow/What a Wonderful World" medley (Originally recorded by Judy Garland/Louis Armstrong)
- The Maile Serenaders – "My Sweet Sweet"
- The Makaha Sons of Ni'Ihau – "Aloha Ka Manini"
- Manfred Mann's Earth Band – "Blinded by the Light"
- Bob Marley and the Wailers – "Could You Be Loved" and "Is This Love"
- Paul McCartney and Linda McCartney – "Another Day"
- No Doubt – "Underneath It All"
- O-Shen – "Throw Away The Gun"
- Harve Presnell – "They Call the Wind Maria"
- Leon Redbone and Ringo Starr – "My Little Grass Shack in Kealakekua, Hawaii"
- Adam Sandler and Rob Schneider – "Ula's Luau Song"
- Snoop Dogg – "From tha Chuuuch to da Palace"
- 311 – "Amber" and "Rub A Dub"
- Toots and the Maytals – "Pressure Drop"
- The Ventures – "Hawaii Five-O"
- Patty and Mildred Hill – "Happy Birthday to You"

=== Certifications ===
| Region | Certification | Certified units/sales |
|---|---|---|
| United States (RIAA) | Gold | 500,000^{^} |
^{^} Shipments figures based on certification alone.

== Release and reception ==
=== Box office ===
The film was released in the United States and Canada on February 13, 2004, in 3,591 theaters. Over its extended opening weekend (including Monday, due to Presidents' Day in the U.S.), the film grossed $45.1 million, leading for the weekend, and grossed first the following weekend as well.

Throughout its run, it grossed $120.9 million in the United States and Canada and $77.5 million in other territories, for a worldwide total of $198.4 million. The film's theatrical earnings finished 15th for the year of 2004 in the U.S. and Canada, and 26th for the year worldwide.

=== Home media ===
50 First Dates was released on DVD and VHS on June 15, 2004, by Columbia TriStar Home Entertainment. The film was also released in 4K Ultra HD Blu-ray on June 23, 2026, by Sony Pictures Home Entertainment.

== Critical reception ==
On Rotten Tomatoes, 50 First Dates has a score of 45% based on 175 reviews from critics, with an average rating of 5.4/10. The website's consensus states, "Gross-out humor overwhelms the easy chemistry between Adam Sandler and Drew Barrymore, who bring some energy and yucks to this tale of a girl with short-term memory loss and the guy who tries to get her to love him." On Metacritic, the film has a score of 48% based on 38 reviews, indicating "mixed or average" reviews. Audiences surveyed by CinemaScore gave the film a grade A− on scale of A to F.

Critics who enjoyed the film (such as The New York Times reviewer A. O. Scott) praised the uplifting story while lamenting the seemingly excessive and incongruous amount of crude humor and drug references. Roger Ebert gave it three out of four stars, saying "The movie is sort of an experiment for Sandler. He reveals the warm side of his personality, and leaves behind the hostility, anger and gross-out humor... The movie doesn't have the complexity and depth of Groundhog Day... but as entertainment it's ingratiating and lovable." Rex Reed was scathing in his review for The New York Observer, calling the film "stupid, coarse and abysmally unfunny" while singling out offensive humor about brain damage.

Sandler and Barrymore won the award for Best On-Screen Team at the 2004 MTV Movie Awards. The two actors, who had previously worked together in the film The Wedding Singer, are said to regard 50 First Dates as one of their favorite collaborations as professional "soul mates".

== Depiction of amnesia ==
Anterograde amnesia is a condition where one loses the ability to form new memories after damage to the brain. Damage to the hippocampus, which is located in the medial temporal lobe of the brain, has been widely associated as a determining factor of the gravity of the condition.

In an article in The BMJ on depictions of amnesia in film, clinical neuropsychologist Sallie Baxendale writes that 50 First Dates "maintains a venerable movie tradition of portraying an amnesic syndrome that bears no relation to any known neurological or psychiatric condition". True amnesic syndromes are usually a result of a stroke, brain infection, or neurosurgery; very rarely does amnesia result from external physical trauma, such as in a car crash.

In one case, a British woman named Michelle Philpots suffered traumatic brain injuries after two motor vehicle collisions in 1985 and 1990. Subsequently, she developed epilepsy in 1994, which led to her anterograde amnesia. She does not remember anything subsequent to 1994 and also can suffer from shorter term memory loss on the timescale of minutes. Her condition caused her to be fired from her office job after photocopying a single document over and over again, having forgotten she had already completed the task. Each morning, she wakes up believing it is 1994 and her husband, whom she met prior to the crash, has to convince her of their 1997 marriage, using a photo album as proof.

In 2010, researchers described a woman who developed a similar kind of memory impairment after she was involved in a car crash. She described her memory as being normal for events on the same day, with memories from the previous day subsequently being lost each night. However, a neuropsychological test revealed some improvement in recall for tasks which she had, unknowingly, performed the previous day. Although the woman claimed not to have seen 50 First Dates prior to her 2005 crash (but has watched it several times since), she stated that Drew Barrymore was her favorite actress, leading researchers to conclude that her condition might have been influenced by some knowledge of the film's plot, and its impact upon her understanding of amnesia.

In July 2015, two people were discovered to have a form of anterograde amnesia that resembles the type depicted in the movie. One is a man in the UK, originally from Germany. He wakes up every day thinking it is March 14, 2005, because that is the day he underwent anesthesia for a dental procedure which led to this condition as a rare, unexplained complication (however, his anterograde amnesia, like that of others with the condition, causes him to forget facts not daily, but within 90 minutes). The other is a woman who reportedly believes every day is October 15, 2014; she was visiting Kettering General Hospital for a kickboxing injury when she slipped and hit her head on a metal pole.

=== Real-world application ===
In 2015, the Hebrew Home of Riverdale, Bronx, had started an experimental program in which residents with early dementia watch a video every morning wherein they see comforting messages and reminders from family members who they may still know. The program was to be evaluated for potential inclusion of more residents. Robert Abrams of NewYork–Presbyterian Hospital considered this idea "both innovative and thoughtful". Charlotte Dell, director of social services for the home, said the program was inspired by 50 First Dates.

== Stage musical adaptation ==
A stage musical adaptation based on the film was staged at The Other Palace in London, directed and choreographed by Casey Nicholaw, from 14 September to 16 November 2025.
