= Mountain Apple Company =

American record label

- Industry: Music & Entertainment
- Founded: 1977
- Headquarters: Honolulu, Hawaii, United States
- Key people: Jon de Mello
- Products: Music & Entertainment
- Website: mountainapplecompany.com

The Mountain Apple Company is a record label based in Honolulu, Hawaii, that specializes in traditional and contemporary music of Hawaii as well as other artists with a connection to Hawaii. It is known for popularizing the career of Israel Kamakawiwoʻole.

== History ==
It was founded and incorporated in 1977 by Jon de Mello, who is its chief executive officer, who named it when a Mountain Apple fell from a tree onto his tin roof right as he was trying to come up with a name for the company. In 2016, the Mountain Apple Company moved its office from Honolulu to Kailua. The company merged with Island Heritage, a Hawaiian merchandise company, later that year.

== Artists ==
- Alfred Apaka
- Keola & Kapono Beamer
- The Brothers Cazimero (Robert & Roland)
- Charles K. L. Davis
- Jack de Mello
- Troy Fernandez
- Taimane Gardner
- Amy Hanaialiʻi Gilliom
- Raiatea Helm
- Don Ho
- Willie K (Kahaialii)
- Kuana Torres Kahele
- Israel Kamakawiwoʻole
- Cecilio & Kapono
- Melveen Leed
- Arthur Lyman
- Brother Noland
- Mākaha Sons
- Bitty McLean
- Sean Na‘auao
- Dennis Pavao
- Bill Tapia
- Emma Veary
- Na Palapalai (band)
- Natural Vibrations (band)

As well as: Irmgard Aluli, Del Beazley, Don Baduria, Jimmy Borges, Kekuhi Kanahele, Kaumakaiwa Kanakaʻole, Nina Kealiʻiwahamana, Mailani, Sean Naʻauao, Anthony Natividad, Mary Kawena Pukui, Rap Reiplinger, Makua Rothman, Palani Vaughan, HAPA, and The Hawaiian Style Band.

== See also ==
- List of record labels
