= Jack de Mello =

American composer, arranger, producer, and recording artist (1916–2019)

Jack de Mello (November 15, 1916 – April 27, 2019) was an American composer, arranger, producer, and recording artist from Hawaii. He was known for being a composer and advocate of Hawaiian music.

Jack de Mello composed music for animated television series including The Flintstones and The Jetsons. He was the father of Jon de Mello.
