= The Brothers Cazimero =

Hawaiian musical duo

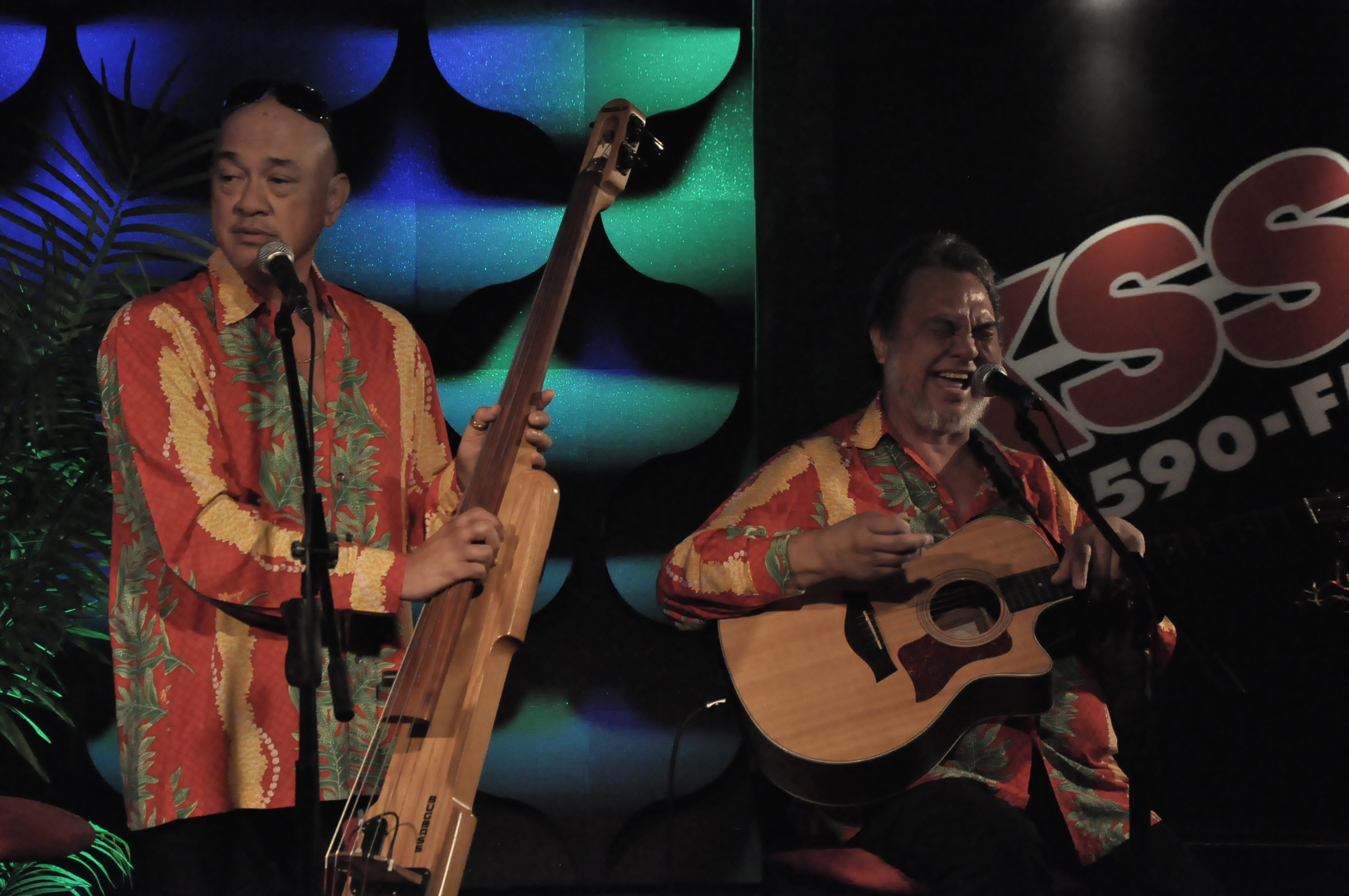
- The Brothers Cazimero performing in 2009

Background information
- Years active: 1969–2017
- Labels: Music of Polynesia and The Mountain Apple Company
- Past members: Robert Cazimero; Roland Cazimero

The Brothers Cazimero were a Hawaiian musical duo made up of Robert Cazimero on bass and Roland Cazimero on twelve string guitar. Robert also played piano as a solo musician. The Cazimeros got their start during the Hawaiian Renaissance with ukulele and slack-key guitarist Peter Moon's band, The Sunday Manoa, on their first recording, Guava Jam. Since that time, The Brothers Cazimero have released at least 36 recordings and three DVDs. For three decades, the group performed at the annual Lei Day Concert. They made their Carnegie Hall debut in 1989.

The Hawai'i Academy of Recording Arts (HARA) has honored the Cazimeros with 25 Nā Hōkū Hanohano Awards. Robert and Roland have also received individual Hōkū Awards as solo artists. The Cazimeros' album Some Call It Aloha...Don't Tell was nominated for a Grammy Award for Best Hawaiian Music Album in 2005. In 2006, they were inducted into the Hawaiian Music Hall of Fame.

In 1991, Roland joined Henry Kapono Kaʻaihue, Israel "Iz" Kamakawiwo'ole and Cyril Pahinui in recording "Broken Promise", a Hawaiian mele ku'e (song of protest) written by Kaaihue. The project won two Hōkū Awards -- "Song of the Year" and "Single of the Year"—in 1992.

Robert Cazimero is also a kumu hula (teacher of hula) for the hālau hula (a contemporary translation is "hula school") Hālau Nā Kamalei o Lililehua. Members of the hālau have often performed with Robert and Roland as dancers and as a choral group. The Brothers are featured (with 3 songs) on the audio track for the Over Hawaii documentary which was broadcast on public television stations in 2012.

Leina'ala Kalama Heine, a kumu hula, performed as a solo dancer with the Brothers Cazimero, a distinct honor in hula. She was sometimes called "the third brother" due to her professional relationship with the Cazimeros.

Roland Cazimero died at the age of 66 on July 16, 2017.

== Select discography ==
- The Brothers Cazimero, Music of Polynesia MOP 38000
- The Brothers Cazimero vol. II, Music of Polynesia MOP 41000
- The Brothers Cazimero in Concert, Music of Polynesia MOP 47000, 1977
- Ho'āla, Mountain Apple Company MAC 1005 Recorded 1978
- Hawaiian Hula Eyes, 1982
