= Wonderful World (Israel Kamakawiwoʻole album) =

Compilation album by Israel Kamakawiwoʻole
- Released: June 26, 2007
- Recorded: 1988–1994
- Genre: Hawaiian, reggae
- Length: 42 minutes

Israel Kamakawiwoʻole chronology
Alone in Iz World (2001)	Wonderful World (2007)	Somewhere Over the Rainbow: The Best of Israel Kamakawiwoʻole (2011)

Wonderful World is an album by the Hawaiian musician Israel Kamakawiwoʻole released 2007, a decade after his death in 1997. The album is considered a classic, and suggested in some tourist guides as representative of Hawaiian contemporary music. The song is featured in the credits to the movie Meet Joe Black.

== Track listing ==
Wonderful World track listing
No.	Title	Length
1.	"What a Wonderful World"	4:30
2.	"ʻAmaʻama"	2:15
3.	"Henehene Kou ʻAka"	4:18
4.	"Twinkle Twinkle Little Star"	4:14
5.	"E Kuʻu Morning Dew"	3:42
6.	"White Sandy Beach"	3:02
7.	"Kaleohano"	3:38
8.	"Ka Huila Wai"	3:34
9.	"ʻŌpae Ē"	4:21
10.	"Ke Alo O Iesu"	3:16
11.	"ʻUlili Ē"	2:35
12.	"A Hawaiian Like Me"	2:29
Total length:		41:54
