= Peter Moon (musician) =

American ukulele and slack-key guitar player

- Born: Peter Moon; August 25, 1944; Honolulu, Oʻahu, Territory of Hawaii, United States
- Died: February 17, 2018 (aged 73); Oʻahu, Hawaii, United States
- Occupations: Ukulele and guitar player, record producer, song writer
- Known for: Active musician in Hawaii

Peter Moon (August 25, 1944 – February 17, 2018) was an American ukulele and slack-key guitar player.

== Career ==
Peter Moon was born in Honolulu on the island of Oʻahu to parents of Korean and Chinese descent, Wook Moon and Shay-Yung Moon (née Zen). He graduated from Roosevelt High School in 1962 and from the University of Hawaii at Manoa in 1968. From the late 1950s through the 1960s, he gained musical inspiration, insight, and knowledge; playing as a Maile Serenader with Gabby "Pops" Pahinui in the 1960s. Later, in the 1970s, he also served as Gabby's manager. Soon after, Moon became a founding member of The Sunday Manoa, along with Palani Vaughan, Albert "Baby" Kalima Jr., and Cyril Pahinui (one of Gabby's sons). After Vaughan and Cyril left the group, Moon released another album (Hawaiian Time) with Kalima and Cyril's older brother, "Bla" Pahinui. Kalima and Pahinui moved on and Moon remained the only member and recruited Robert and Roland Cazimero who were a few years younger. In 1971, their first album, Guava Jam was released and became seen as the spark of the Hawaiian Cultural Renaissance. Two more albums were released, but personal conflicts within the group led to their eventual breakup.

After the breakup of The Sunday Manoa, the Cazimeros continued on as the Brothers Cazimero. Moon continued to be a force on the music scene co-founding Kanikapila, a two-day music festival at the University of Hawaii that ran for 25 years. Moon, however, did not return to regular performing until 1979, when his new group, The Peter Moon Band, released Tropical Storm, which garnered four Na Hoku Hanohano Awards. In 1983, Moon released Cane Fire, which earned six Na Hoku Hanohano awards; Moon earning an unprecedented seventh with a Sunday Manoa anthology album. The band was extremely popular, with an unmatched stylistic range that ran from Hawaiian to reggae to samba, jazz, and swing. Throughout the 1980s, The Peter Moon Band remained a staple of the Hawaiian music scene winning a third Na Hoku Hanohano award for album of the year with Black Orchid in 1988. The "PMB" also met great success from tours in Japan. During those years there were many changes in the band's membership. Listed in no particular order the complete of the musicians who worked with Moon as members of the group are Bobby Hall, Steven Hall, Martin Pahinui, Cyril Pahinui, Randy Lorenzo, Merv Ching, Milt Holland, Mark Yim, Dwight Kanae, Ocean Kaowili, David Choy, and Steve Wofford.

In the mid 1990s, Moon started producing instrumental albums which led to his first ʻukulele instructional video, The Magic of the Ukulele. Moon was active in other facets of the music business in Hawaiʻi, including the new version of Hawaii Calls where the Peter Moon Band was one of the first guests. He started his own record label and distributing company, and he produced and promoted two annual festivals. In 1970 he and Ron Rosha co-founded of the Kanikapila (Hawaiian for "let's play music") festival, a celebration of Hawaiian music and dance, at the University of Hawaii at Manoa. They started the festival because many college-aged young people did not know many of the greats in Hawaiian music such as Gabby Pahinui. Kanikapila remained an annual event for 25 years, then was revived briefly in 2002 as Kalakoa Jam. Later, he produced the Blue Hawaiian Moonlight concerts at the Waikiki Shell, featuring prominent names in Hawaiian music.

Peter Moon was inducted into the Hawaiian Music Hall of Fame in 2007.

Peter Moon is survived by his son, Peter Wook Moon.

== Discography ==
=== with Sunday Manoa ===
==== Studio ====
- Meet Palani Vaughan and the Sunday Manoa (1967)
- Hawaiian Time (1968)
- Guava Jam (1969)
- Crack Seed (1972)
- Sunday Manoa 3 (1973)

==== Compilation ====
- Best of Sunday Manoa Vol I (1982)
- Best of Sunday Manoa Vol II (1982)

=== with Peter Moon Band ===
==== Studio ====
- Tropical Storm (1979)
- Malie (1980)
- Best of the Peter Moon Band (1981)
- Cane Fire (1982)
- Harbor Lights (1983)
- The Guitar Man (1988)
- Black Orchid (1988)
- Full Moon (1989)
- The Music Makers (1990)
- Heat Wave (1991)
- Midnight Sun (1992)
- Oasis (1993)
- Iron Mango (1994)
- Hoi Hou (1995)
- The Path (1996)
- Kanikapila (1997)
- Juicy Fruits (1998)
- Island Afternoon w/Dwight Kanae (1999)
- Island Afternoon 2 w/Dwight Kanae (2000)

==== Compilation ====
- Greatest Hits Collection I (1986)
- Greatest Hits Collection II (1988–1998) (1999)

=== Other albums ===
- Dance with Me (1989)
- Ho'i Hou (1995)
- Kanikapila (1998)

== Sources ==
- Kanahele, George, and John Berger, eds., Hawaiian Music & Musicians, 2nd edition (2012) (2012). Hawaiian Music and Musicians: An Encyclopedic History. Honolulu: Mutual Publishing. ISBN 978-1-56647-967-7.
- Tranquada, Jim (2012). The Ukulele: A History. Honolulu: University of Hawaii Press. ISBN 978-0-8248-3634-4.
