= Israel Kamakawiwoʻole =

American musician and singer (1959–1997)

- Kamakawiwoʻole in 1993
- Born: Israel Kaʻanoʻi Kamakawiwoʻole; May 20, 1959; Honolulu, Territory of Hawaii, U.S.
- Died: June 26, 1997 (aged 38); Honolulu, Hawaii, U.S.
- Occupations: Musician; singer; activist
- Years active: 1976–1997
- Children: 1
- Musical career
- Genres: Hawaiian; folk; world; reggae
- Instruments: Ukulele; vocals
- Label: Mountain Apple Company

Israel Kaʻanoʻi Kamakawiwoʻole (Note: Hawaiian pronunciation: [kəˌmɐkəˌvivoˈʔole]; meaning 'the fearless eye, the bold face') (May 20, 1959 – June 26, 1997), also called Braddah IZ or simply IZ, was an American musician and singer. He is regarded as one of the greatest musicians from Hawaii and the most successful musician from the state. Along with his ukulele playing and incorporation of other genres, such as jazz and reggae, Kamakawiwoʻole remains influential on Hawaiian music. In 2010, he was named one of the 50 Great Voices by NPR, who called him "The Voice of Hawaii".

Kamakawiwoʻole achieved commercial success and mainstream popularity with his 1993 studio album, Facing Future. His medley of "Somewhere Over the Rainbow/What a Wonderful World" from his album Ka ʻAnoʻi (1990), spent 375 weeks on top of the World Digital Songs chart, making it the longest-leading number-one hit on any of the Billboard song charts.

== Early life and education ==
Israel Kaʻanoʻi Kamakawiwoʻole was born at Kuakini Medical Center on May 20, 1959, in Honolulu to Henry "Hank" Kaleialoha Naniwa Kamakawiwoʻole Jr. and Evangeline "Angie" Leinani Kamakawiwoʻole, who worked at a popular Waikiki nightclub. Angie was the manager while Hank was a bouncer; his father also drove a sanitation truck at the U.S. Navy shipyard at Pearl Harbor. The notable Hawaiian musician Moe Keale was Kamakawiwoʻole's uncle and a major musical influence. Kamakawiwoʻole was raised in the community of Kaimuki, where his parents had met and married.

Kamakawiwoʻole began playing music with his older brother, Henry Kaleialoha Naniwa Kamakawiwoʻole III ("Skippy"), and cousin Allen Thornton, at age 11 after being exposed to the music of Hawaiian entertainers of the time such as Peter Moon, Palani Vaughan, Keola Beamer and Don Ho, who frequented the establishment where Kamakawiwoʻole's parents worked. Hawaiian musician Del Beazley spoke of the first time he heard Kamakawiwoʻole perform, when, while playing for a graduation party, the whole room fell silent on hearing him sing. Kamakawiwoʻole remained in Hawaii as his brother Skippy entered the Army in 1971, and his cousin Allen moved to the mainland in 1976.

In his early teens, Kamakawiwoʻole studied at Upward Bound (UB) of the University of Hawaii at Hilo and his family moved to Mākaha. There, Kamakawiwoʻole met Louis Kauakahi, Sam Gray, and Jerome Koko. Together with Skippy, they formed the Makaha Sons of Niʻihau. A part of the Hawaiian Renaissance, the band's blend of contemporary and traditional styles gained in popularity as they toured Hawaii and the mainland United States, releasing fifteen successful albums. Kamakawiwoʻole's aim was to make music that stayed true to the typical sound of traditional Hawaiian music. His cousin Bill Keale is also a musician.

== Music career ==
The Makaha Sons of Niʻihau recorded No Kristo in 1976 and released several more albums, including Hoʻoluana, Kahea O Keale, Keala, Makaha Sons of Niʻihau and Mahalo Ke Akua.

The group became Hawaii's most popular contemporary traditional group with breakout albums 1984's Puana Hou Me Ke Aloha and its follow-up, 1986's Hoʻola. Kamakawiwoʻole's last recorded album with the group was 1991's Hoʻoluana. It remains the group's top-selling CD. In 1982, Skippy died at age 28 of a heart attack. Later that year, Kamakawiwoʻole married his childhood sweetheart Marlene. They had a daughter named Ceslie-Ann "Wehi" Kamakawiwoʻole (born c. 1983).

In 1990, Kamakawiwoʻole released his first solo album Ka ʻAnoʻi, which won awards for Contemporary Album of the Year and Male Vocalist of the Year from the Hawaiʻi Academy of Recording Arts (HARA). Facing Future was released in 1993 by The Mountain Apple Company. It featured a version of his most popular song, the medley "Somewhere Over the Rainbow/What a Wonderful World" (listed as "Over the Rainbow/What a Wonderful World"), along with "Hawaiʻi '78", "White Sandy Beach", "Maui Hawaiian Sup'pa Man", and "Kaulana Kawaihae". The decision to include a cover of "Somewhere Over the Rainbow" was said to be a last-minute one by Kamakawiwoʻole's producer Jon de Mello and Kamakawiwoʻole. Facing Future debuted at No. 25 on Billboard magazine's Top Pop Catalogue chart. On October 26, 2005, Facing Future became Hawaiʻi's first certified platinum album, selling more than a million CDs in the United States, according to the Recording Industry Association of America. On July 21, 2006, BBC Radio 1 announced that "Somewhere Over the Rainbow/What a Wonderful World (True Dreams)" would be released as a single in America.

In 1994, Kamakawiwoʻole was voted favorite entertainer of the year by the Hawaiʻi Academy of Recording Arts (HARA). E Ala E (1995) featured the political title song "ʻE Ala ʻE" and "Kaleohano", and N Dis Life (1996) featured "In This Life" and "Starting All Over Again".

In 1997, Kamakawiwoʻole was again honored by HARA at the annual Na Hoku Hanohano Awards for Male Vocalist of the Year, Favorite Entertainer of the Year, Album of the Year, and Island Contemporary Album of the Year. He watched the awards ceremony from a hospital room.

The posthumously released album Alone in Iz World (2001) debuted at No. 1 on Billboard's World Chart and No. 135 on Billboard's Top 200, No. 13 on the Top Independent Albums Chart, and No. 15 on the Top Internet Album Sales charts. In November 2012, Honolulu magazine ranked it as the third-greatest Hawaii album of the 21st century.

Kamakawiwoʻole's album Facing Future was the first Hawaii album to be certified gold.

== Support of Hawaiian rights ==
Kamakawiwoʻole was known for promoting Hawaiian rights and Hawaiian independence, both through his lyrics, which often stated the case for independence directly, and through his own actions. For example, the lyric in his song "Hawaiʻi '78," "The life of this land is the life of the people/and ... to care for the land (malama ʻāina) is to care for the Hawaiian culture," is a statement that many consider summarizes his Hawaiian ideals. The state motto of Hawaiʻi is a recurring line in the song and encompasses the meaning of his message: "Ua Mau ke Ea o ka ʻĀina i ka Pono" (proclaimed by King Kamehameha III when Hawaiʻi regained sovereignty in 1843). It can be roughly translated as, "The life of the land is perpetuated in righteousness."

Kamakawiwoʻole used his music to promote awareness of his belief that a second-class status had been pushed onto fellow natives by the tourism industry.

== Later life ==
In the 1990s, Kamakawiwoʻole became a born-again Christian. In 1996, he was baptized at the Word of Life Christian Center in Honolulu and spoke publicly about his beliefs at the Na Hoku Hanohano Awards. Kamakawiwoʻole also recorded the song "Ke Alo O Iesu" (Hawaiian: The Presence of Jesus).

== Health issues and death ==
Throughout his life, Kamakawiwoʻole struggled with obesity. At one point weighing 757 pounds (343 kg), he endured chronic respiratory and cardiac issues, leading to multiple hospitalisations. Kamakawiwoʻole died of respiratory failure at age 38 in the Queen's Medical Center in Honolulu at 12:18 am on June 26, 1997.

On July 10, 1997, the Hawaiian flag flew at half-mast for Kamakawiwoʻole's funeral. His koa wood casket lay at the state capitol building in Honolulu, making him the third person (and the only non-government official) to be so honored. Approximately 10,000 people attended his funeral. Thousands of fans gathered as his ashes were scattered into the Pacific Ocean at Mākua Beach two days later. According to witnesses, many people commemorated him by honking their car and truck horns on all Hawaiian highways that day. Scenes from the funeral and scattering of Kamakawiwoʻole's ashes were featured in official music videos of "Over the Rainbow", released posthumously by Mountain Apple Company. As of May 2025, the two official video uploads of the song, as featured on YouTube by Mountain Apple Company Inc, have collectively received over 1.83 billion views.

On September 20, 2003, hundreds paid tribute to Kamakawiwoʻole as a bronze bust of him was unveiled at the Waianae Neighborhood Community Center on Oʻahu. Kamakawiwoʻole's widow, Marlene, and sculptor Jan-Michelle Sawyer were present for the dedication ceremony.

== Legacy ==
On December 6, 2010, NPR named Kamakawiwoʻole as "The Voice of Hawaii" in its 50 Great Voices series.

On March 24, 2011, Kamakawiwoʻole was honored with the German national music award Echo. The music managers Wolfgang Boss and Jon de Mello accepted the trophy in his stead.

A 2014 Pixar short film, Lava, features two volcanoes as the main characters. Kamakawiwoʻole's cover of "Somewhere Over the Rainbow" and his style of music were James Ford Murphy's partial inspiration for the short film.

In 2013, Kamakawiwoʻole was posthumously inducted into the Hawaiian Music Hall of Fame, first as a member of the Mākaha Sons and four years later again in 2017 as a solo artist.

On May 20, 2020, Google Doodle published a page in celebration of Kamakawiwoʻole's 61st birthday. It featured information about his life, musical career, and impact on Hawaii. Included was a two-minute cartoon video with Kamakawiwoʻole's cover of "Somewhere Over the Rainbow" playing as the background and imagery of Hawaii. The section of the page explaining the inspiration of the Doodle says that "The Doodle is full of places in Hawaiʻi that had special significance for Israel: the sunrise at Diamond Head, Mākaha Beach, the Palehua vista, the flowing lava and volcanic landscape of the Big Island, the black sand beach at Kalapana and the Waiʻanae coast."

=== "Somewhere Over the Rainbow/What a Wonderful World" ===
Somewhere Over the Rainbow / What a Wonderful World
Snippet lasting 31 seconds

Kamakawiwoʻole's recording of "Somewhere Over the Rainbow/What a Wonderful World" gained notice in 1999 when an excerpt was used in the TV commercials for eToys.com (later part of Toys "R" Us). The full song was featured in the movies K-Pax, Meet Joe Black, Finding Forrester, Son of the Mask, 50 First Dates, Fred Claus, Letters to Santa and IMAX: Hubble 3D. It was also featured in TV series ER, Between The Lions, Scrubs, Cold Case, Glee, South Pacific, Lost, Storm Chasers, the original UK version of Life on Mars, and in Modern Family, among others.

In 1988, a friend of Kamakawiwoʻole called a Honolulu recording studio owned by Milan Bertosa at 3:00 a.m. with a request that Kamakawiwoʻole be allowed to come in to make a recording. Bertosa was about to shut down, but told the friend that Kamakawiwoʻole could come if he was able to make it within 15 minutes. In a 2011 interview, Bertosa recalled, "In walks the largest human being I had seen in my life. Israel was probably like 500 pounds. And the first thing at hand is to find something for him to sit on." A security guard gave Kamakawiwoʻole a large steel chair. "Then I put up some microphones, do a quick sound check, roll tape, and the first thing he does is 'Somewhere Over the Rainbow.' He played and sang, one take, and it was over." Five years later, Bertosa was working as an engineer at Mountain Apple Company when Iz was making a solo album there. Bertosa remembered the old demo tape and introduced it to de Mello, who remarked: "Israel was really sparkly, really alive." The original 1988 acoustic version of the song was released with the 1993 Facing Future album.

"Somewhere Over the Rainbow/What a Wonderful World" reached No. 12 on Billboard's Hot Digital Tracks chart the week of January 31, 2004 (for the survey week ending January 18, 2004). It had passed two million paid downloads in the US by September 27, 2009, and then sold three million in the U.S. as of October 2, 2011. And, as of October 2014, the song has sold more than 4.2 million digital copies. The song is the longest-leading number-one hit on any of the Billboard song charts, having spent 358 weeks on top of the World Digital Songs chart.

On July 8, 2007, Kamakawiwoʻole debuted at No. 44 on the Billboard Top 200 Album Chart with "Wonderful World", selling 17,000 units.

In April 2007, "Over the Rainbow" entered the UK charts at No. 68, and eventually climbed to No. 46, spending ten weeks in the Top 100 over a two-year period.

In October 2010, following its use in a trailer for the TV channel VOX and on a TV advertisement—for Axe deodorant (which is itself a revival of the advertisement originally aired in 2004)—it hit No. 1 on the German singles chart, was the number-one seller single of 2010 and was eventually certified 2× Platinum in 2011.

As of November 1, 2010, "Over the Rainbow" peaked at No. 6 on the Ö3 Austria Top 40 charts, which is the official Austrian singles chart. It also peaked at No.1 in France and Switzerland in late December 2010.

On December 21, 2020, the official music video for "Over the Rainbow" reached a billion views on YouTube.

In 2021, the song was inducted into the National Recording Registry as part of the heritage in American recorded sound.

== Awards and nominations ==
Award	Year	Nominee(s)	Category	Result	Ref.
Echo Music Prize	2011	Himself	Best International Male	Nominated	
Echo Music Prize	2011	"Over the Rainbow"	Hit of the Year	Won	

== Discography ==
=== Studio albums ===
- Ka ʻAnoʻi (1990)
- Facing Future (1993)
- E Ala E (1995)
- N Dis Life (1996)

=== Compilation albums ===
- IZ in Concert: The Man and His Music (1998)
- Alone in IZ World (2001)
- Wonderful World (2007)
- Somewhere Over the Rainbow: The Best of Israel Kamakawiwoʻole (2011)

== See also ==
- Asteroid 402841 Kamakawiwoʻole
