= Mākaha Sons =

American musical group

The Mākaha Sons (formerly The Mākaha Sons of Niʻihau) is a musical group in Hawaii, first formed in 1976 on the island of Oahu. The original members of the band were Jerome Koko, Louis "Moon" Kauakahi, Skippy Kamakawiwoʻole, Israel Kamakawiwoʻole, and Sam Gray. The name was changed to the Makaha Sons after Israel Kamakawiwoʻole went solo.

The band started its career as an opening act at a small nightclub called Uptown Yokos. The group has changed members several times, with the original version of the band ending with Skippy Kamakawiwoʻole died of a heart attack in 1982.

The Mākaha Sons of Niʻihau and the Makaha Sons have released 21 CDs, and produced a DVD on their own record label. They have won Nā Hōkū Hanohano Awards and Hawaii Music Awards. They produced their own signature concert, "Take a Walk in the Country," in Hawaii for many years.

In commemoration of the group’s 30th anniversary, the Sons reflect back to the times and places they have had the privilege and honor to have been a part of. Their performances have taken them to such prestigious places as Carnegie Hall in New York City, Washington, D. C., and in Hawaii, with performances for both the President and Vice President of the United States. They have also appeared on the movie, North Shore and have been featured guests on shows as The Captain and Tennille Show and NBC's Today Show with Bryant Gumbel and Katie Couric. Locally they have appeared on shows such as Island Music, Island Heart and Emme’s Island Moments, and have accompanied American musician Kenny Loggins for his CD release party at Ala Moana Center.

== Albums ==
- No Kristo (1976)
- Kahea O Keale (1977)
- Keala (1978)
- Live at Hanks Place (1978)
- Self titled Album (1979)
- Mahalo, Ke Akua (1981)
- Puana Hou Me Ke Aloha (1984)
- Hoʻola (1986)
- Hoʻoluana (1991)
- Ke Alaula (1994)
- Kuikawa (1996)
