= Ray Fonseca (dancer) =

American hula dancer and hula master

Rae (or Ray) Fonseca (November 17, 1953 – March 20, 2010) was an American hula dancer and hula master. Fonseca established the Halau Hula O Kahikilaulani in 1980, a Hilo-based halau.

Fonseca was a student of kumu hula master George Naʻope, who gave Fonseca the name, Kahikilaulani. Fonseca's halau, Halau Hula O Kahikilaulani, integrated Hawaiian culture, language and folklore into its hula instructions. The hulau had more than 100 students, who ranged in age from 4 up to 60 years old, as of March 2010.

He pleaded no contest to second-degree negligent homicide in 2006 for killing a moped driver in a traffic accident in 2003. Fonseca was driving 40 mph in a 25 mph speed zone when he struck the moped with his sports utility vehicle while trying to avoid potholes. The judge sentenced him to six months in prison, but allowed work release during the day for community service and to teach hula.

On March 20, 2010, Fonseca flew from Hilo to Oahu to perform at the Lei o Lanikuhonua Hula Festival in Ko Olina. He was a strong supporter of the festival, which was founded in 2006 and allows high school students to perform and study with hula masters. He collapsed back stage minutes after completing a hula performance. Fonseca, who suffered a heart attack, was 56 years old.

Fonseca's death came less than a day after the passing of another prominent hula figure, Auntie Dottie Thompson, who developed the Merrie Monarch Festival. He had visited her at her bedside before her death.
