= Nāpua Greig =

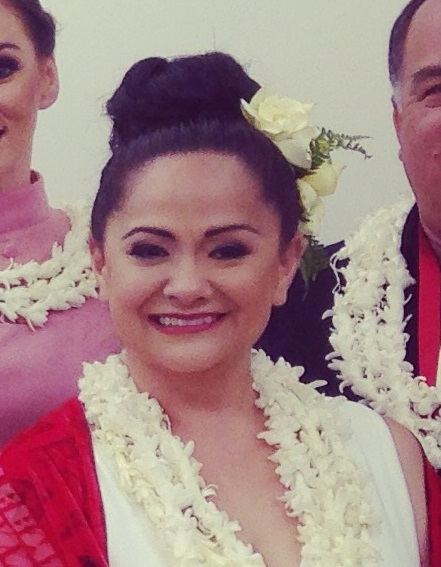

Background information
- Born: March 4, 1974 (age 52); Pukalani, Hawaii, U.S.
- Genres: Hawaii; Hawaiian Music
- Occupations: Singer-songwriter; Musician; Record producer; Kumu hula; Educator
- Instruments: Ukulele; Ipu; Kālaʻau; ʻUlīʻulī; ʻIliʻili; Puniu; Pahu Drum; Vocals
- Years active: 1995-present
- Labels: Pihana Productions, LLC
- Website: NapuaMusic.com

Jaye Nāpua Greig-Nakasone (born March 4, 1974), known professionally as Nāpua Greig, is a Hawaiian musician, vocalist, songwriter, record producer, kumu hula (hula teacher), and educator from Maui, Hawaii. Known primarily for her contributions as kumu hula of Hālau Nā Lei Kaumaka O Uka, she arranges traditional Hawaiian music as well, performing and recording with instruments such as ukulele, ipu, and other traditional Hawaiian hula implements. She has released four solo albums, each earning a Nā Hōkū Hanohano Award.

In 2014, Greig voiced the character "Lele" in the Pixar animated short film Lava, alongside fellow musician, Kuana Torres Kahele, who voiced "Uku." It hit #1 on the Billboard World Digital Song Sales chart in July 2015.

In 2015, Greig ran unsuccessfully for the upcountry Maui County Council seat representing Pukalani, Kula, and Ulupalakua.

== Hālau ==
After successfully completing the ʻūniki process from her kumu hula, Greig launched her own hula hālau. Today, she currently operates three hālau: Hālau Nā Lei Kaumaka O Uka, Hālau O Ka Ua Makanoe (Chiba, Japan), and Hālau O Naleihiwa (Sapporo, Japan).

Hālau Nā Lei Kaumaka O Uka is Greig's primary hālau. The hālau was originally founded in 1996 with her sister kumu hula Kahulu Maluo-Huber. The hālau is a registered 501(c)(3) non-profit organization. Currently, the hālau serves over 200 hula students on the island of Maui ages 5 and up. Hālau Nā Lei Kaumaka O Uka has won awards including at the Merrie Monarch Festival, the Hula ʻOni E, Queen Liliʻuokalani Keiki Hula Festival, the Hula O Nā Keiki, Moku o Keawe International Hula Festival, and the Kū Mai Ka Hula.

== Discography ==
=== Solo albums ===
- 2021: Home
- 2017: Makawalu
- 2013: Kūlaia
- 2011: Mōhalu
- 2008: Pihana

=== Contributions ===
- 2012: Mana Maoli Vol. IV - Too Much Heaven ft. Rush House
- 2011: Hōʻala ʻIapana - Puna Kuʻu Aloha

=== Makawalu ===
Makawalu (2017), meaning "Eight eyes", culminated several years of Greig's research and composing, and features more original compositions than her other projects. The album encourages the listener to look beyond the surface. Greig took in her surroundings and her practices and wove them into 12 songs, and then into hula dances.

The album was nominated for 10 Nā Hōkū Hanohano awards at the 41st Annual Nā Hōkū Hanohano Awards, including Album of the Year, Female Vocalist of the Year, Hawaiian Album of the Year, Music Video of the Year, Engineering (Hawaiian), Hawaiian Language, Graphics Award, Liner Notes, and Haku Mele (Composer).

== Music Awards ==
=== Nā Hōkū Hanohano Awards ===
The Na Hoku Hanohano Awards, occasionally called the "Hoku Awards", are the premier music awards in Hawaii and are Hawaii's equivalent to the Grammy Awards. The awards are presented to the musicians exemplifying the best work in their class. Greig, has been nominated for the Nā Hōkū Hanohano Awards more than a dozen times for a number of award categories. She has won an award six times, one of which was an adjudicated award for Best Graphics on her Makawalu album. The album was designed by multiple award-winning graphic design artist Wailani Artates of Artisty8.

Year	Album	Category	Result	Ref
2018	Makawalu	Album of the Year	Nominated	
2018	Makawalu	Female Vocalist of the Year	Nominated	
2018	Makawalu	Hawaiian Album of the Year	Nominated	
2018	Makawalu	Graphics Award	Won	
2018	Makawalu	Liner Notes	Nominated	
2018	Makawalu	Hawaiian Language Performance of the Year	Nominated	
2018	Makawalu	Haku Mele	Nominated	
2018	Makawalu	Haku Mele	Nominated	
2018	Makawalu	Engineering	Nominated	
2013	Kūlaia	Christmas Album of the Year	Won	
2011	Mōhalu	Hawaiian Album of the Year	Won	
2011	Mōhalu	Female Vocalist of the Year	Nominated	
2011	Mōhalu	Female Entertainer of the Year	Won	
2011	Mōhalu	Favorite Entertainer of the Year	Won	
2008	Pihana	Best Female Vocalist	Won	
2008	Pihana	Most Promising Artists of the Year	Nominated	
2008	Pihana	Hawaiian Album of the Year	Nominated	
2008	Pihana	Song of the Year	Nominated	

== Filmography ==
Yr	Release Title	Creator	Role
2011	Maui Divas	Maui Divas concert	Singer
2014	Lava	Animated short film by Pixar	Voice of Lele the volcano

== Politics ==
In 2015, Greig announced her candidacy for the upcountry Maui County Council seat representing, Pukalani, Kula, and Ulupalakua. The seat was vacated by longtime council member Gladys Baisa who met the maximum number of terms and could no longer run for the seat again. When asked about her candidacy, Greig credited her parents for exposing her and her siblings to campaigns at an early age and therefore the candidacy fulfilled a lifelong commitment to public service.

Greig captured 42% of the votes and lost the seat to longtime local Democratic party official, Yuki-Lei Sugimura, who secured 43.9% by 1,050 votes.
