= Ray Fonseca =

Ray Fonseca may refer to:

- Ray Fonseca (dancer) (1953–2010), American hula dancer
- Ray Fonseca (politician) (born 1959), US Virgin Island senator
