= Iolani =

ʻIolani is a masculine Hawaiian name meaning "royal hawk." It comes from the Hawaiian words ʻio, meaning "Hawaiian hawk," and lani, meaning "royal."

It may refer to:

Places

- ʻIolani School, a private school located in Hawaii
- ʻIolani Palace, a museum and former residence of the monarchs of Hawaii
- ʻIolani Barracks, barrack for the Royal Guards

People

- Liholiho ʻIolani, King Kamehameha II, Hawaii's second king, Kamehameha IV's namesake
- Alexander Liholiho ʻIolani, also known as Kamehameha IV, Hawaii's fourth king, for which the palace was named
- ʻIolani Luahine, Hawaiian kumu hula, dancer, chanter and teacher,
