= Na Palapalai =

Hawaiian music band

Nā Palapalai
- Origin: Hilo, Hawaii
- Genres: Hawaii; Hawaiian Music
- Years active: 1995–present
- Label: Mountain Apple Records
- Past members: Ione Burns
- Website: NaPalapalaiMusic.com

Nā Palapalai is a Hawaiian music band, originally founded in Hilo, Hawaii. Founded by Kuana Torres Kahele, Kapulanakehau "Kehau" Tamure, and Keao Costa. The group arranges traditional and contemporary Hawaiian music, performing and recording with instruments such as ukulele, guitar, ipu, and upright bass. The majority of the lyrics are written and performed in the Hawaiian language. The group has released a total of eight albums each earning multiple Na Hoku Hanohano Awards, including Group of the Year. Several have charted in the top five on the Billboard Top World Albums chart,

== History ==
In 1995, at 17, Kuana and fellow Hilo native and falsetto musician, Kehau Tamure, emerged as one of the most popular Hawaiian Music groups to date, Na Palapalai. They were raised on traditional music and laid the foundation for what has come to be known as their distinctive Na Palapalai sound.

In 2002, they released “Makani ‘Olu’olu” to meteoric success and raves from the critics. Kuana's original, “Ke Anu O Waimea” is still the most popular hula song in Japan to this day. Na Palapalai has continued to maintain its popularity 20 years later and has released seven albums to date.

=== Hoʻopili Hou ===
After a lengthy hiatus, Na Palapalai returned to the stage with all three original members (Kuana Torres Kahele, Kehau Tamure, and Keao Costa) The album was recorded live at the Historic Hawai’i Theatre during Kuana's 2017 Winter Wonderland concert.

== Discography ==
- 1999: Kaona
- 2002: Makani ʻOluʻolu
- 2004: Ke ʻAla Beauty
- 2006: Ka Pua Hae Hawaiʻi
- 2009: Nānea
- 2010: The Best of Na Palapalai
- 2012: Haʻa
- 2018: Hoʻopili Hou (live)

== Music Awards ==
=== Nā Hōkū Hanohano Awards ===
The Na Hoku Hanohano Awards, occasionally called the "Hoku Awards", are the premier music awards in Hawaiʻi and are Hawaiʻi's equivalent to the Grammy Awards. The awards are presented to the musicians exemplifying the best work in their class. Nominated 17 times and winner of 7 Na Hoku Hanohano Awards including “Hawaiian Album of the Year,” “Group of the Year,” and “Hawaiian Language,” Na Palapalai is internationally recognized through awards for its highly spirited Hawaiian music.

- 2000: Kaona - Group of the Year

== See also ==
- Music of Hawaii
- Kuana Torres Kahele
