= ʻIolani Luahine =

Native Hawaiian kumu hula, dancer, chanter and teacher

- Iolani Luahine, photograph from The Honolulu Advertiser
- Born: January 31, 1915; Honaunau-Napoopoo, Hawaii, U.S.
- Died: December 10, 1978 (aged 63); Hawaiʻi
- Other name: Harriet Lanihau Makekau
- Occupations: Kumu hula, dancer, chanter and teacher
- Known for: High priestess of the ancient hula

ʻIolani Luahine (January 31, 1915 – December 10, 1978), born Harriet Lanihau Makekau, was a native Hawaiian kumu hula, dancer, chanter and teacher, who was considered the high priestess of the ancient hula. The New York Times wrote that she was "regarded as Hawaii's last great exponent of the sacred hula ceremony," and the Honolulu Advertiser wrote: "In her ancient dances, she was the poet of the Hawaiian people." The ʻIolani Luahine Hula Festival was established in her memory, and awards a scholarship award each year to encourage a student to continue the study of hula.

== Early years ==
Luahine was born in 1915 in the village of Nāpoʻopo'o, near Captain Cook, Hawaii. Her given name was Harriet Lanihau Makekau, and she was the youngest of five daughters in a pure Hawaiian family that traced its genealogy to dancers and keepers of ancient Hawaiian rituals and chants. Iolani was raised by her great-aunt Julia Keahi Luahine (1877–1937), who began educating her in the ancient Kauai school of hula when she was four years old. Her aunt Keahi was "the foremost hula instructor of her day and one of the last royal dancers from King Kalākaua's and Queen Lili’uokalani's court." When she was a child, she was afflicted with an illness in her eyes, and a kahuna nui (seer) said she had to be renamed Iolani, heavenly, or royal hawk, after the `io, native Hawaiian hawk. Her eyesight reportedly cleared shortly after her name was changed. Iolani attended the Kamehameha Schools, but her aunt removed her after learning that dancing hula was forbidden by the "missionary" institution. After leaving the Kamehameha Schools, Luahine attended St. Andrew's Priory, at St. Andrew's Cathedral, where hula dancing was permitted. Iolani later attended the University of Hawaiʻi where she began hula classes with Mary Kawena Pukui. As Iolani's mentor, Pukui steered her away from the commercialized hula forms popularized by Hollywood films.

== Practitioner and teacher of the ancient hula ==
Luahine opened a hula studio in her home on Honolulu's Queen Street in 1946. There, she taught hula to students of all ages. Her well-known students included George Naʻope, Kawaikapuokalani Hewett and her niece, Hoakalei Kamau'u. In 1947, modern-dance pioneer Ted Shawn called her "an artist of world stature." She continued to perform and collaborate with other renowned hula artists, including her former teacher, Mary Kawena Pukui, and Lokalia Montgomery. She was featured in two documentary films, one in 1960 and the other in 1976, and several television programs. She has been referred to as the "high priestess" of the ancient hula", a "link to traditional Hawaiian culture", and "the last handmaiden to the Hawaiian gods."

Her students and friends spoke of her lessons in a reverent manner. Luana Haraguchi called Luahine her greatest influence and said, "When she danced, she floated. Sometimes when she taught, she would just tell us a story, about the people, the types of rain and vegetation in a certain song. It could last two or three hours. That was the dance class."

Dorothy Thompson, a co-founder of the Merrie Monarch Festival, an annual week-long hula festival in Hilo, Hawaii, described Luahine as follows: "Her dance was her life and her story itself. 'Io was such a beautiful person, an extraordinary dancer. She seemed like she would go into a trance. And her movements were like nobody else's."

Some who knew her told stories of Luahine's "mystic abilities." The Honolulu Advertiser wrote that those who saw her perform "typically speak about the almost mystical experience she seemed to channel." Some say she had "a deep, spiritual connection to the hula goddess Laka and the volcano goddess Pele." Others claimed that she "could call up the wind and the rain and could make animals do her bidding." In 1969, organizers of the Merrie Monarch Festival were about to cancel their parade because of heavy rain, but Luahine said the rain would stop for two hours starting at 1 p.m. Even organizer Dorothy Thompson recalled: "She told me the parade had to start on time, at 1 o'clock, because the rain would stop for only two hours. It poured cats and dogs. At 1 o'clock on the nose the rain stopped, and at 3 o'clock the rain came down."

Hula master George Naʻope told a story that the Queen of Tonga and an FBI escort were visiting Hawaii, and the queen would not get out of the car because it was too windy. According to Na'ope's story, "Iolani turned around, chanted, and the wind stopped. After that, the queen and the FBI were supposed to go to a hotel in Kona, and instead they went to Iolani’s house in Napoopoo, where she summoned all the animals to greet the queen. Her dog barked, her cat meowed, her rooster crowed, her pig oinked, and they bowed to the queen. When someone said that they are not supposed to be at Iolani’s house, an FBI agent replied, 'If she can stop the wind, we are going to be here.'"

In 1970, Luahine and Lokalia Montgomery became the first recipients of Hawaii's State Order of Distinction for Cultural Leadership. Luahine gained worldwide recognition and was invited to perform at the National Folk Festival in Wolf Trap, Virginia three times. She was named a "Living Treasure" in 1972.

In 1972, she was still performing. Honolulu Star-Bulletin columnist Ben Wood recalled playing recordings for her featuring Gabby Pahinui, Sonny Chillingworth, Atta Isaacs and Eddie Kamae. He later wrote: "When the music started, Iolani fell silent and a distant look came to her eyes. Then she sprang up and started dancing to the music. I was in awe."

== Posthumous honors and recognition ==
When she died in 1978, The New York Times wrote that she was "regarded as Hawaii's last great exponent of the sacred hula ceremony." The Honolulu Advertiser wrote: "In her ancient dances, she was the poet of the Hawaiian people." A mainland newspaper called her "the foremost hula dancer of the 20th century." The Honolulu Star-Bulletin called her "easily one of Hawaii's greatest dancers if not the greatest." And the Honolulu Advertiser wrote:

"Yet, while Luahine certainly helped bring international recognition and respect to traditional hula, her impact in her home Islands might have been even greater in that she helped keep Hawaiian culture alive through the latter days of its suppression. ... As a kumu in her own right, Luahine, a longtime curator of the Hulihe'e Palace in Kailua, Kona, and an adviser to the Merrie Monarch Festival, would become one of the most ardent and beloved practitioners of ancient Hawaiian hula and chant."

In 1980, Iolani Luahine received an academic and lifetime achievement award called Na Makua Mahalo Ia presented by the Institute for Polynesian Studies under Brigham Young University Hawaii. This award was presented after Aunty Iolani's death, therefore, her student and niece Hoakalei Kamau`u humbly received the award in her honor.

In 1985, Hawaiian photographer and historian, Francis Haar, published a biography of Luahine.

In 1997, a statue of Luahine (sculpted by Kim Duffet) was dedicated at the Hilton Hawaiian Village, where Luahine performed in the 1950s.

In 2003, the 'Iolani Luahine Hula Festival was established to perpetuate the hula, the memory of Luahine, and her contributions to the preservation of hula and the Hawaiian culture. The festival awards a hula scholarship award each year to encourage a student to continue the study of hula.

In 2005, the documentary film, Keepers of the Flame: The Cultural Legacy of Three Hawaiian Women profiled Luahine, her teacher Mary Kawena Pukui and Edith Kanakaole.

In March 2017, Hawaiʻi Magazine ranked her among a list of the most influential women in Hawaiian history.
