= Molokai Ka Hula Piko =

Annual hula festival

Coordinates: 21.1738°N 157.2514°W

Molokai Ka Hula Piko is an annual festival of the hula, held for three days every spring in Kaana, Molokai. Ka Hula Piko in Hawaiian means the "center of the hula dance".

== History ==
The first festival was in 1991 by the Molokai Visitors Association and John Kaimikaua, a Kumu Hula. It is currently organized by the Halau Hula o Kukunaokala.

It is held in annually in Kaana because according to Hawaiian legend, Laka, now regarded as the goddess of hula, created hula at Pu'u Nana, a sacred hill in Kaana, before spreading the art form across the islands.

This festival went on hiatus in 2020.

== Festival ==
The festival begins with an early-morning ceremony at Puʻu Nana. It then continues with a ho'olaule'a, lectures, and other activities intended to educate and spread awareness of hula as an art form.

== See also ==
- Merrie Monarch Festival
