= ʻIolani Luahine Hula Festival =

The Iolani Luahine Hula Festival was established in 2003 with the goal of perpetuating the hula, and in memory of ʻIolani Luahine, a great hula dancer and teacher of the mid-20th century.

It is held in Kailua Kona, on Luahine's native Big Island of Hawaii, and draws international as well as local participants. A scholarship is awarded to one of the participants to enable them to continue their study of hula.
