= Hālau hula =

School or hall where hula dance is taught

A hālau hula (Hawaiian pronunciation: [haːˈlɐw ˈhulə]) is a school or hall in which the Hawaiian dance form called hula is taught. The term comes from hālau, literally, "long house, as for canoes or hula instruction"; "meeting house", and hula, a Polynesian dance form of the Hawaiian Islands. Today, a hālau hula is commonly known as a school or formal institution for hula where the primary responsibility of the people within the hālau is to perpetuate the cultural practice of hula.

== Description ==
There is great variation between hālau. Some focus primarily on ancient styles of hula, others on modern styles, and some study both. Some hālau continue to preserve very strict kapu, sacred protocols, while others are noa, or free of kapu. The styles of hula taught in different hālau also can vary greatly. Styles are passed down from kumu to haumāna, and knowledgeable students of hula can tell which hula lineage is represented by watching the dancer's presentation.

=== Physical space ===
Traditionally, a hālau was constructed as a sacred space and dedicated to the god Laka. Although Hawaiians had many gods, within a hālau Laka was important as evidenced by the kuahu, or altar, which stood in the hālau space and required constant care. The kuahu was adorned with greenery in honor of the Gods, song-offerings and pule, or prayers, were also offered to this sacred dwelling space within the hālau.

The location of hālau today vary widely, from the kumu's home to community centers, to the lawns of parks. Hālau hula can be found wherever there is space and a company or troupe of hula students.

=== Internal structure ===
The internal structure of a hālau hula can vary quite a bit, generally these are led by a kumu hula, or master teacher, whose position is roughly equivalent to that of a headmaster. The kumu is responsible for maintaining the integrity of the style and traditions handed down to them by their kumu, during their hula training. Their kuleana, or responsibility, is therefore to uphold the training and discipline of their haumāna through a perpetuation of their hālau traditions. The kumu is also responsible for the spiritual integrity of the hālau, and is responsible for instructing students in the proper care and protocol of the hālau, which includes their physical well-being by teaching good exercise, dietary, and hygienic practices.

Within a hālau there are typically two classes of performers. The ʻōlapa, or dancers, who, like the ʻōlapa tree (Cheirodendron trigynum) dance with agility and bend gracefully alikened to the motion of the leaves of the ʻōlapa. Along with the hoʻopaʻa, or steadfast class of performers. The hoʻopaʻa are responsible for instrumentation and typically chant and dance with their instruments while sitting or kneeling, accompanying the ʻōlapa dancers. Typically, this role was for students with more experience and maturity.

The poʻopuaʻa, or head student, is often the kumu's protégé, and under the direction of the kumu oversees the protocol and rituals of the hālau.

The alakaʻi or "guides" act as teaching assistants, with the more advanced effectively being student teachers. Alakaʻi often will assist less experienced haumāna with their lessons, and coach them with the more difficult steps and moves.

Kōkua or helpers assist in a variety of areas, from lei making, to helping other haumāna dress, making phone calls, fund raising, and helping alakaʻi coach less experienced students.

Haumāna, the students, range in age from toddlers to senior citizens.

== History ==
Prior to European contact, the Hawaiian language had no word for "school", as the concept of a specialized place of instruction did not exist in Hawai`i prior to the arrival of Christian missionaries. Education came from parents, aunts, uncles, and elders, while children who showed promise in a specialized art or craft would be apprenticed to a master and work in the latter's hālau.

In ancient times, students joining a hālau hula would be dedicated solely to the study of hula for the duration of their training. Their families would provide maintenance for the support of the hālau. Hālau hula training was strict, with haumāna put on kapu or rules and codes of conduct which banned the cutting of hair and the practicing of any kind of sexual activity.

Today, students have set hours for study at the hālau, and often pay monthly dues to help the kumu with support and maintenance. Present-day hālau hula each have their own set of rules for their haumāna, with many still enforcing the traditional rule of not cutting one's hair. Each year, the distinctive styles of each hālau can be seen at the Merrie Monarch Festival held in Hilo. Hālau are judged on individual (Ms. Aloha Hula) and group performances in categories for kāne (men) and wāhine (women). Winners are recognized for their performances of kahiko (traditional), ʻauana (contemporary) and an Overall Festival Winner is recognized.

== Curriculum ==
Four basic steps are commonly used in all hālau hula, and each of the steps has many variants. All of the basic steps in hula require the shoulders to remain steady and both knees to be in a bent position at all times.

- Kaholo or travel step – usually consists of four beats. This step is probably one of the most common, especially for beginning students of hula, when a mele or song is danced. The kaholo is often the dance step used during the "vamp," musical measures between the verses of songs.
- Hela – a step occupying a one beat count and requires one to point out one foot at a time in front of one's body. The foot slides forward just above, and parallel to, the ground in a graceful point.
- ʻUwehe – this is done by lifting and setting back one foot then elevating both heels and pushing the knees forward rapidly. Depending on the style of ʻuehe, the knees may move straight forward or at angles of up to 45 degrees from the center line. The lifted foot alternates.
- Ami – requires the dancer to rotate his or her hips in an elliptical motion while keeping both feet firmly planted on the ground.

== List of hālau hula ==
=== In Hawaiʻi ===
- Hālau Hula Olana, Kumu Hula Howard and Olana Ai (Pearl City)
- Hālau Hula ʻo ka Leo O Laka I Ka Hikina o ka Lā, Kumu Hula Kaleo Trinidad (Honolulu)
- Hālau Hula Ka Noʻeau, Kumu Hula Michael Pili Pang (Waimea)
- Hālau I Ka Wēkiu, Kumu Hula Karl Veto Baker and Michael Nālanakila Casupang (Honolulu)
- Hālau Kekuaokalāʻauʻalaʻiliahi, Kumu Hula Iliahi and Haunani Paredes (Maui)
- Hālau Mōhala ʻIlima, Kumu Hula Mapuana de Silva (Kaʻohao, Kailua)
- Hālau Haʻa Hula o Kekauʻilani Nā Pua Hala o Kailua, Kumu Hula Charlani Kalama (Kailua / Waimānalo)
- Hālau Nā Kamalei o Līlīlehua, Kumu Hula Robert Uluwehi Cazimero (Honolulu)
- Hālau Nā Lei Kaumaka o Uka, Kumu Hula Nāpua Greig (Maui)
- Hālau Nā Mamo O Puʻuanahulu, Kumu Hula Sonny Ching (Honolulu)
- Hula Hālau ʻo Kamuela, Kumu Hula Kauʻionālani Kamanaʻo and Kunewa Mook (Kalihi/Waimanalo)
- Na Lei ʻo Kaholokū, Kumu Hula Nani Lim Yap and Leialoha Amina (Kohala)
- Hālau nā lei hiwahiwa o kuʻualoha (Sammy-Ann Kuualoha Young)

=== In the Continental United States ===
- Los Angeles, CA)
- Hālau Hula Moaniʻaʻala Anuhea, Kumu Hula Christina Nani Aiu-Quezada (Monterey Park, CA)
- Hālau Nā Meakanu o Laka o Hawaiʻi, Kumu Hula Rolanda Mohala Valentin Reese (Los Angeles, CA)
- Hālau Nā Mamo ʻo Panaʻewa, Kumu Hula Keoki Wang (Los Angeles, CA)
- Hālau Hula Nā Pua o ka Laʻakea, Kumu Hula Shawna Alapaʻi (San Rafael, CA)
- Hālau Hula o Malulani, Kumu Hula Kapena Malulani Perez (San Diego, CA)
- Hālau Hula ʻo Hoaloha, "Kumu Hula" Maile Frauchiger (Los Angeles, CA)
- Makani Kai Polynesian Dance Troupe (San Diego, CA)
- Hula Hālau Ho'okamaha'o, Kumu Hula Kaipo Kalua (San Antonio, TX)
- Hula Hālau ʻo Lilinoʻe, Kumu Hula Sissy Kaio (Carson, CA)
- Kealiʻi ʻO Nalani, Kumu Hula Kealiʻi Ceballos (Los Angeles)
- Na Lei Hulu I Ka Wekiu, Kumu Hula Patrick Makuakane (San Francisco, CA)
- Halau Nohona Hawaiʻi, Kumu Hula Kaimana Chee (Silver Spring, MD)
- Hula Halau 'O Pi'ilani, Kumuhula Toni Kanani Densing, (Sunnyvale, CA) www.piilani.com
- Hawaii (hālau nā lei hiwahiwa o kuʻualoha (Sammy-Ann kuʻualoha young)
- San Diego Hula Academy (San Diego, CA | Kumu Hula Kristin Kawena Garuba)

=== In Europe ===
- Aloha ʻAina, Kumu Hula Verena Kainz (Salzburg, Austria)
- Halau Hula Makahikina, Kumu Hula Monika Lilleike (Berlin, Germany)
