= Kuana Torres Kahele =

Hawaiian musician (born 1978)

- Born: September 7, 1978 (age 47); Hilo, Hawaii, U.S.
- Genres: Hawaii; Hawaiian Music
- Occupations: Singer-songwriter; musician; record producer; dancer; educator
- Instruments: Guitar; Ukulele; bass; ipu; vocals
- Years active: 1995-present
- Labels: Kuana Torres Kahele; Mountain Apple Company
- Website: kuanatorreskahele.com

Kuana Torres Kahele (born September 7, 1978) is an American musician, vocalist, songwriter, record producer, dancer, and educator from Hilo, Hawaii. Known primarily for his original acoustic compositions, Kahele arranges traditional Hawaiian music as well, performing and recording with instruments such as ʻukulele, guitar, ipu, and bass (to name a few). The majority of his lyrics are written and performed in the Hawaiian language. After learning Kane Hula and Haku Mele (Hawaiian composing) in his teens, in 1995 Kahele co-founded Nā Palapalai, a Hawaiian music group that has released a number of albums. Several have charted in the top five on the Billboard Top World Albums chart, and the group has won a large number of Nā Hōkū Hanohano Awards, including Group of the Year.

Kahele released his first solo album, Kaunaloa, in 2011, which reached No. 2 on the Top World Albums Chart and won Kahele five Nā Hōkū Hanohano Awards, including Male Vocalist of the Year. He has released several charting solo albums since, and in 2014 released two volumes from his Music for the Hawaiian Islands series. Also in 2014 Kahele voiced the lead character in Lava, an animated short film by Pixar. Kahele regularly teaches cultural workshops around the world. In Japan he runs the Kuana School of Hawaiian Music & Culture, teaching 200+ students in Tokyo, Fukuoka and Osaka.

== Discography ==
=== Group albums ===
- 1999: Akoni And Da Palapalai Patch: Kaona
- 1999: Johnny Lum Ho: Hālau O Ka Ua Kani Lehua
- 2002: Nā Palapalai: Makani ʻOluʻolu
- 2003: Nā Palapalai: Hula Leʻa Magazine Vol. 3 (Japan)
- 2004: Nā Palapalai: Keʻala Beauty
- 2006: Nā Palapalai: Ka Pua Hae Hawaiʻi
- 2007: Johnny Lum Ho: Canʻt You Hear Me Calling?
- 2007: Nā Palapalai: Disneyʻs Hawaiian Album (E Komo Mai)
- 2009: Nā Palapalai: Nanea
- 2010: Nā Palapalai: Best Of Nā Palapalai
- 2012: Nā Palapalai: Haʻa
- 2018: Nā Palapalai DVD: Hoʻopili Hou
- 2020: Nā Palapalai: Back To The Patch
- 2020: Nā Palapalai: Ka Nani Vol. 1
- 2020: Nā Palapalai: Ka Nani Vol. 2
- 2020: Nā Palapalai: Greatest Hula Hits

=== Solo albums ===
- 2011: Kaunaloa
- 2012: Hilo for the Holidays
- 2013: Kahele
- 2014: ʻOhai Aliʻi (Single)
- 2014: Music For The Hawaiian Islands: Vol. 1 Hawai'i Keawe (Hawai'i Island)
- 2014: Music For The Hawaiian Islands: Vol. 2 Kahelelani (Ni'ihau)
- 2015: Music For The Hawaiian Islands: Vol. 3 Pi'ilani (Maui)
- 2015: Music For The Hawaiian Islands: Vol. 4 Manookalanipō (Kaua'i)
- 2017: Music For The Hawaiian Islands: Vol. 5 Lānaʻikaʻula (Lānaʻi)
- 2017: Music For The Hawaiian Islands: Vol. 6 ʻĀina Momona (Molokaʻi)
- 2018: Back To Hilo For The Holidays
- 2019: Music For The Hawaiian Islands: Vol. 7 Kākuhihewa (Oʻahu)
- 2021: Nani Waiʻale

== Filmography ==
Yr	Release Title	Creator	Role
2014	Lava	Short film by Pixar	Voice of Uku the volcano

== See also ==
- Music of Hawaii
