= Lava (2014 film) =

2014 Pixar short film

- Directed by: James Ford Murphy
- Written by: James Ford Murphy
- Produced by: Andrea Warren
- Starring: Kuana Torres Kahele; Nāpua Greig
- Music by: James Ford Murphy
- Production company: Pixar Animation Studios
- Distributed by: Walt Disney Studios; Motion Pictures (Note: Distributed by Walt Disney Studios Motion Pictures through the Walt Disney Pictures banner.)
- Release dates: June 14, 2014 (Hiroshima International Animation Festival); June 19, 2015 (with Inside Out)
- Running time: 7 minutes
- Country: United States
- Language: English

Lava is a 2014 American animated musical short film produced by Pixar Animation Studios. Written and directed by James Ford Murphy and produced by Andrea Warren, it premiered at the Hiroshima International Animation Festival on June 14, 2014, and was theatrically released alongside Pixar's Inside Out, on June 19, 2015.

The short is a musical love story that takes place over millions of years. It is set to a song (also called "Lava") written by Murphy, and was inspired by the "isolated beauty of tropical islands and the explosive allure of ocean volcanoes." In an interview with Honolulu-based KHON-TV, Murphy explained that his interest in Hawaii began 25 years prior while honeymooning on the main island of Hawai'i. Shortly before film production began, Murphy went back to Hawaii in order to "reconnect emotionally" with the land that sprung his inspiration.

Years later, Murphy heard Israel Kamakawiwoʻole's rendition of "Somewhere Over the Rainbow/What a Wonderful World", which touched him. Murphy stated: "I put together this fascination and love and this experience I had with my wife in Hawaii, with this feeling I had for this song and thought, wow, if I could blend those two things, it would be really—a film I would love to see."

The idea began to coalesce while attending the wedding of his sister, who married at age 43. Murphy recalled: "As my sister stood up on the altar, I thought about how happy she was and how long she'd waited for her very special day. There, at my sister’s wedding, I remembered Loihi and I had an epiphany... What if my sister was a volcano? And what if volcanoes spend their entire lives searching for love, like humans do?" "Lava" is unique in that it lacks any verbal communication other than the song.

== Plot ==
On a tropical island in the Pacific Ocean, a lonely volcano named Uku watches the wildlife creatures frolic with their mates and wishes to find one of his own. Uku sings a song to the ocean every day for millions of years, gradually venting his lava and sinking into the water, but does not realize that a female submarine volcano named Lele has heard him every day and has fallen in love with Uku.

Lele emerges on the day Uku becomes almost extinct, but her face is turned away and she cannot see him. Uku sinks fully into the ocean, heartbroken, but revives after hearing Lele singing his song to him. As a result, Uku's fire reignites and he erupts back to the surface alongside Lele. The two then merge to form a single island so that they can sing together.

== Production ==
Before creating "Lava," the director, James Ford Murphy, identified characteristics in which he wanted Lava to mimic. These desired characteristics came from 5 other Disney Pixar Shorts that Murphy revealed:

1. "Knick Knack" (1989)
2. "For the Birds" (2000)
3. "Partly Cloudy" (2009)
4. "Day & Night" (2010)
5. "La Luna" (2011)

== Cast ==
- Kuana Torres Kahele as Uku, a lonely volcano searching for his true love. His face is an amalgamation of the faces of Kahele, Israel "IZ" Kamakawiwoʻole, The Honeymooners star Jackie Gleason and the bulldog Marc Antony from the Chuck Jones animated short film Feed the Kitty. Kahele himself also voices the Narrator throughout the song.
- Nāpua Greig as Lele, a volcano and Uku's love interest. Her and Uku's names form the word "ukulele".

=== Crew ===
The production of the film took an entire year and required a 100-person crew.

== Reception ==
=== Critical response ===
The short had mixed reviews.

Nicholas Garrett gave the short a positive review; he said that "it is one of their most touching and subtle (shorts)". Oliver Lyttelton said that it was "beautiful". Pat Mullen gave the short 5 stars out of 5, praising its "fantastic visuals" and its "overall originality and artistry". Nelson Rivera said "The story is told musically, which is always exciting, because music can really get to core emotions and Lava most certainly achieves this, almost effortlessly".

However, Pablo Ruiz gave a negative review, describing its storytelling as "lazy" and arguing that "there's no character growth, no arc. There's no story. It's just things happening on screen." Michael Colan ranked Lava as one of Pixar's weakest short films based on the writing, saying it has "too much telling, not enough showing". He praised the short film for its "gorgeous animation", however, and thought that it had a "good idea."

=== Accolades ===
The short film "Lava" made its debut as the main opening headliner for the opening day of the Hiroshima film festival’s grand opening day celebration event.

== Song ==
The song to the short, also titled "Lava", was released on June 16, 2015, as a digital single, and as a bonus track on the CD release of Inside Out's soundtrack.

== See also ==
- List of Pixar shorts
