= James Ford Murphy =

American animator

James Ford Murphy is an American animator. He started his career as an art director for Jockey which displaying layouts for the commercials of company’s underwear. And then, he later worked as an animator for commercials including Little Caesars in Calabash animation studio before he left to become an animator for video game, Torin’s Passage and afterwards move to his current company at Pixar. He directed the 2014 short film Lava.

== Filmography ==
=== Feature films ===
- A Bug's Life – additional character designer, animator
- Toy Story 2 – animator
- Monsters, Inc. – animator
- Finding Nemo – animator
- The Incredibles – animator
- Cars – directing animator
- Ratatouille – animator
- Wall-E – production resources
- Up – production resources
- Toy Story 3 – fix and additional animator, production resources
- Cars 2 – production resources
- Brave – production resources
- Cars 3 – promotional animation
- Toy Story 4 – custom animation production
- Onward – custom animation production
- Luca – custom animation production
- Turning Red – parks and promo
- Lightyear – parks and promo
- Elemental – parks and promo
- Inside Out 2 - parks and promo

=== Short films ===
- For the Birds – supervising animator
- Mike's New Car – animator
- Mater and the Ghostlight – supervising animator
- Partly Cloudy – special thanks
- Day & Night – special thanks
- La Luna – animator
- Partysaurus Rex – special thanks
- Lava – director, writer, story, music, ukulele
- Miss Fritter’s Racing Skoool - director, writer

=== Documentaries ===
- The Making of 'The Incredibles' – himself (as Jim Murphy)
- The Pixar Story – himself (as Jim Murphy)

== Video games ==
- Torin's Passage – lead animator (as Jim Murphy)
