= Dottie Thompson =

Hawaiian cultural activist

Dorothy Mae Elizabeth Soares Thompson (May 16, 1921 – March 19, 2010), widely known as Auntie Dottie, was an American festival organizer, who is credited with co-founding and developing the Merrie Monarch Festival. The Merrie Monarch Festival, which is held in Hilo, is Hawaii's premier hula event. It was developed by Thompson and hula dancer, George Naʻope.

Dorothy Mae Elizabeth Soares was born on May 16, 1921, the youngest of five children. As a sophomore in 1937 she was named best female athlete of Hilo High School. She graduated from President William McKinley High School in Honolulu in 1939. She had four children with her husband Ronald Saiki. Her second husband was George Thompson.

Thompson served as the Merrie Monarch's executive director since 1968 with Naʻope. She remained the festival's head until her death in 2010. Thompson initially had to push hard for funds and media coverage during the festival's early years. Throughout her tenure as director of the festival, Thompson was careful to keep its main focus on hula. She kept admission prices low and resisted efforts to move Merrie Monarch from Hilo's Edith Kanaka'ole Tennis Stadium, where it has traditionally been held, to a larger facility.

Mayor of Hawaii Billy Kenoi proclaimed February 13, 2010, as Auntie Dottie Thompson Day.

Dorothy "Auntie Dottie" Thompson died from complications from pneumonia at the Hilo Medical Center in Hilo, Hawaii on March 19, 2010, at the age of 88.
