= Merrie Monarch Festival =

Annual festival in Hilo, Hawaii since 1964

Coordinates: 19.719°N 155.068°W

- Dates: Festival: Easter Sunday through the following Saturday; Competition: Thursday, Friday, and Saturday following Easter Sunday
- Locations: Edith Kanakaʻole Multi-Purpose Stadium at Hoʻolulu Park, Hilo, Hawaii
- Years active: 1964–present
- Founders: Helen Hale, Gene Wilhelm, George Naʻope
- Website: www.merriemonarch.com

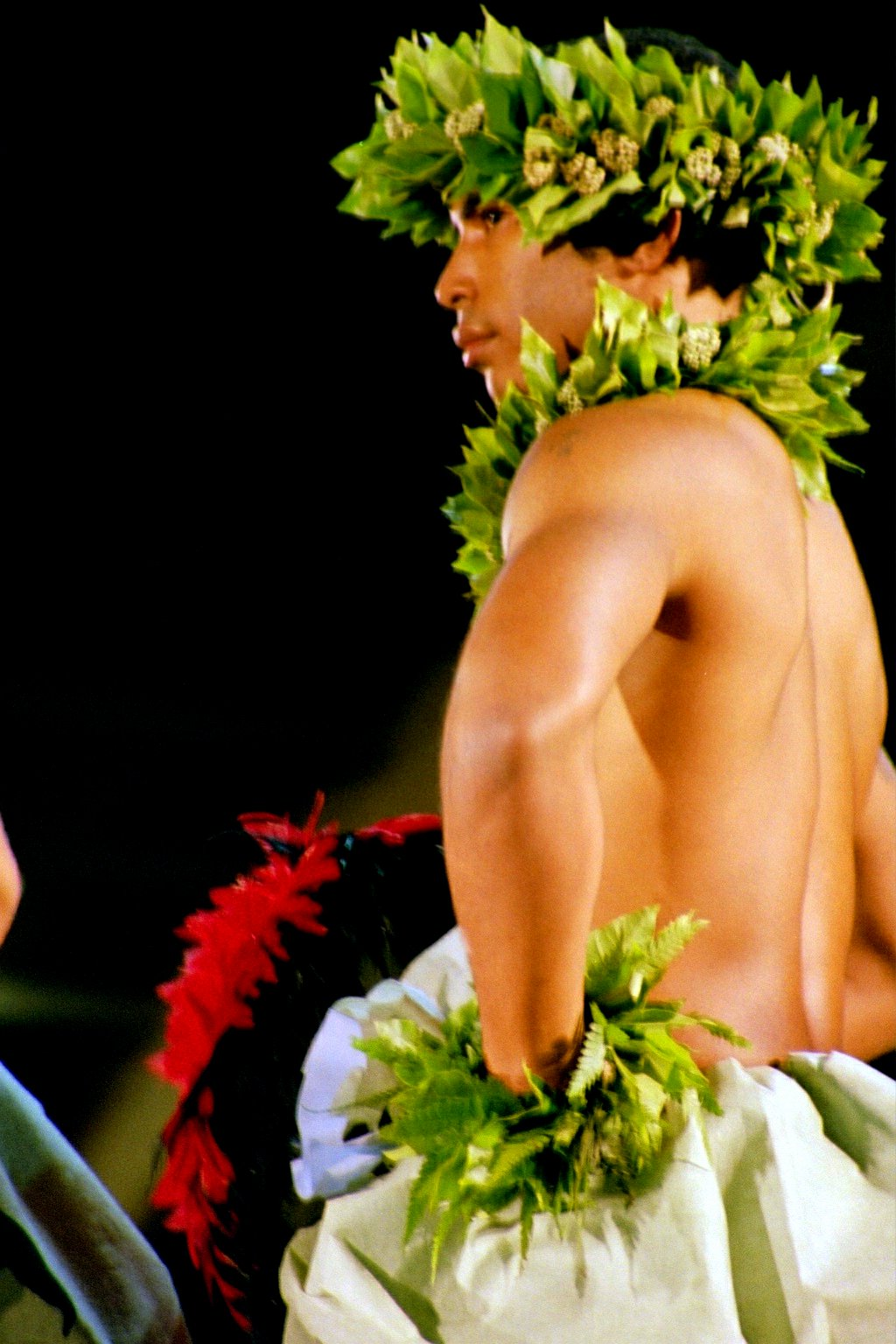
Dancer with ʻulīʻulī, in the men's hula kahiko competition at the 2003 Merrie Monarch Festival

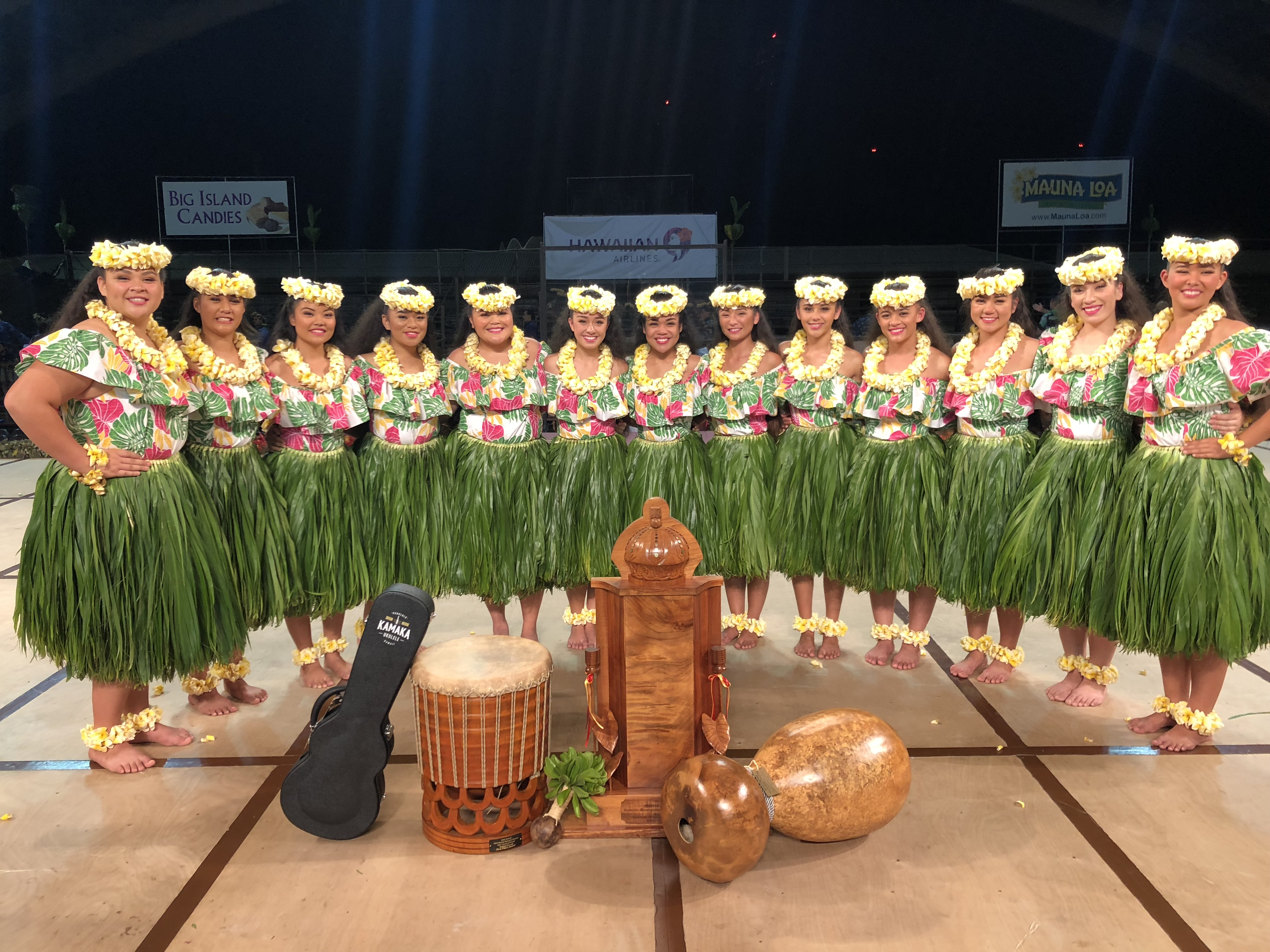
Hula Hālau O Kamuela under the direction of kumu hula Kauʻi Kamanaʻo and Kunewa Mook, overall winners of the 2019 Merrie Monarch Festival

The Merrie Monarch Festival is a week-long cultural festival that takes place annually in Hilo, Hawaii during the week after Easter. It honors King David Kalākaua, who was called the "Merrie Monarch" for his patronage of the arts and is credited with restoring many Hawaiian cultural traditions during his reign, including hula. Many hālau hula (schools), including some from the U.S. mainland and some international performers, attend the festival each year to participate in exhibitions and competitions. The festival has received worldwide attention and is considered the most prestigious of all hula contests.

Merrie Monarch week begins Easter Sunday every year. The competitive hula events end the week, and occur on Thursday, Friday, and Saturday; They are televised and live-streamed for free online by Hawaii News Now (formerly KHII-TV, KFVE/K5).

The 2020 Merrie Monarch festival was cancelled due to coronavirus pandemic concerns. The 2021 competition was held June 24–26, without a live audience, and was broadcast July 1–3 on KFVE.

The 2025 Merrie Monarch hula competition began on Thursday night April 24 at 6:00pm HST, and was livestreamed free all three nights on the website of Hawaii News Now.

== History ==
The festival is dedicated to the memory of King David Kalākaua, the last king of the Kingdom of Hawaii, who reigned from 1874 until his death in 1891. Kalākaua was “a patron of the arts, especially music and dance,” and is credited with reviving many endangered native Hawaiian traditions such as mythology, medicine, and chant. He was also a strong supporter of the hula, a traditional form of dance. Many of these cultural practices "had been suppressed for many years under missionary teachings." The festival is named after Kalākaua's nickname “Merrie Monarch” because he was known to always be happy, fun, and loving towards his people. The structure of the festival takes after Kalākaua's Silver Jubilee. This was a two-week celebration of Hawaiian culture on his 50th birthday (1886) at ʻIolani Palace on the island of Oʻahu.

The Merrie Monarch Festival began in 1963 when Helene Hale, then Executive Officer of Hawaii County, decided to create an event to increase tourism to the Island of Hawaii. The island had suffered from economic problems after the collapse of the sugar industry, and it was hoped that a festival would boost the depressed economy. Along with George Naʻope and Gene Wilhelm, Hale organized the first Merrie Monarch Festival in 1964. This festival “consisted of a King Kalākaua beard look–alike contest, a barbershop quartet contest, a relay race, a re–creation of King Kalākaua's coronation, and a Holoku Ball among other events.”

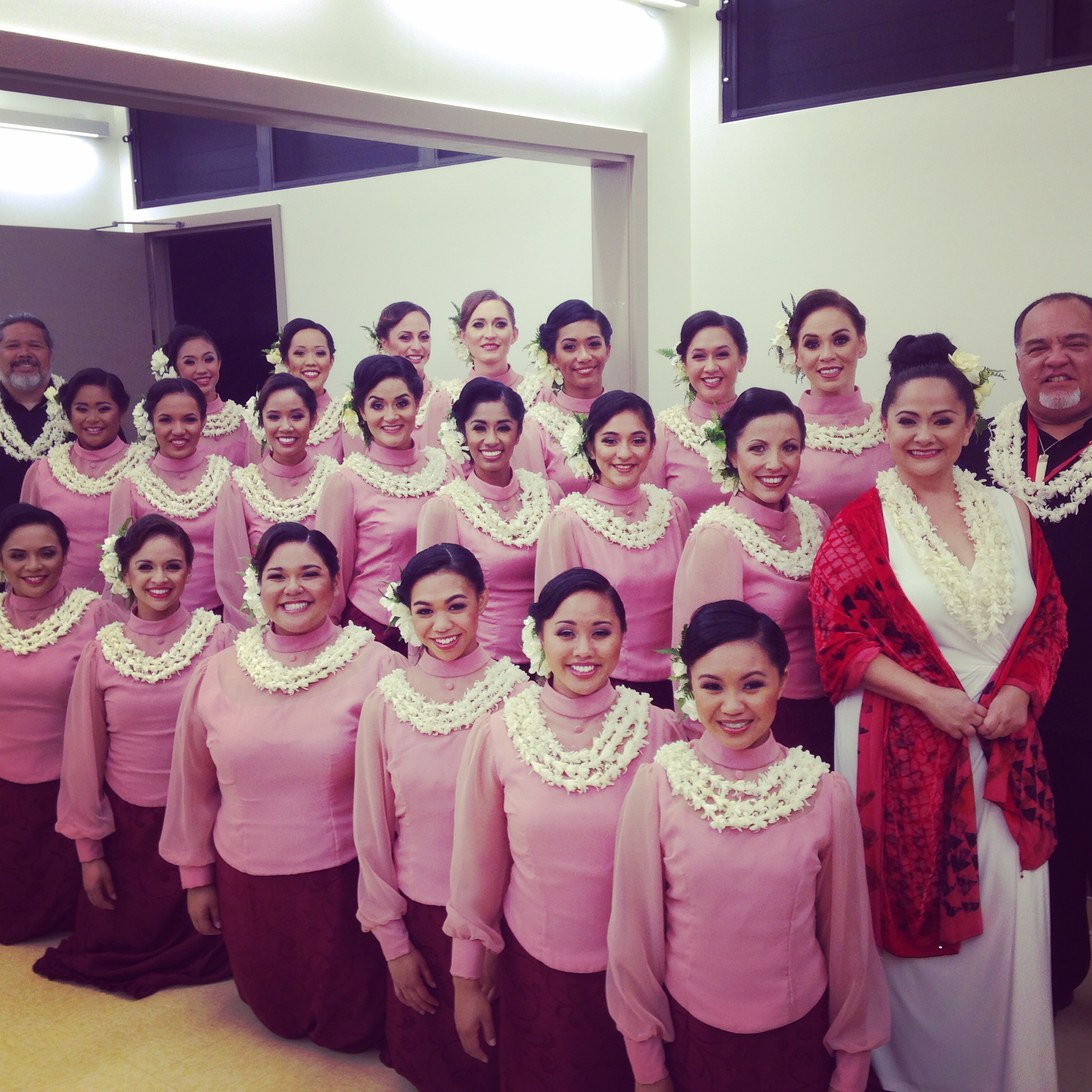
Kumu hula Napua Greig (right, in red) and her hālau, Hālau Nā Lei Kaumaka O Uka, backstage at the 2015 Merrie Monarch competition

George Naʻope was a well known Kumu Hula (teacher of Hawaiian dance) throughout the whole world. He studied hula from his great grandmother since he was three years old and established his own hula school, the George Naʻope Hula School, shortly after graduating high school. He taught hula in Japan, Guam, Australia, Germany, England, and both North and South America. His purpose in life was to preserve the Hawaiian culture, and he thought the festival was a perfect way of allowing the culture live on.

By 1968, the festival had waned in popularity. Dottie Thompson took over the festival as executive director, and transformed it into a private community organization. Thompson "wanted to move the festival more toward a Hawaiian theme," a goal that was accomplished by centering the festival events around hula. In 1971 Thompson and Naʻope introduced a hula competition. Nine wahine (female) hālau entered the competition in its first year, and in 1976 the festival opened the competition to kāne (male) hālau.

Today, the Merrie Monarch Festival is an annual week–long event culminating in three days of prestigious hula competition. It is now a non–profit organization registered with the State of Hawaii Department of Commerce and Consumer Affairs. Proceeds from the festival support educational scholarships, workshops, seminars, symposiums and the continuation of the event itself.

== Festival activities ==
The Merrie Monarch Festival occurs annually in the spring. It runs from Easter Sunday morning to Saturday evening.

=== The Royal Court ===
For the festival, a Royal Court is created to represent King David Kalākaua and Queen Kapiʻolani and their family. The Royal Court is coordinated by Uʻilani Peralto and Luana Kawelu, who each year search for a male and female to portray the king and queen. Peralto says, “the selection committee looks to find two individuals who exemplify maturity, humility, and pride in the Hawaiian culture.” The court consists of 22 members total, typically represented by the friends and family of the chosen king and queen. The rest of the royal court includes a counselor, kahu (caretaker), ladies-in-waiting, kahili bearers, chanters, and pu kane (conch shell blowers). Each person in the royal court is educated about their roles and Kalākaua's mission. These people who make up the Royal Court represent more than just Hawaiian history, but the Hawaiian spirit that continuously flows throughout the islands. The procession of the Royal Court precedes and ends each night of the Merrie Monarch hula competition, and they sit in state during the performances.

=== Non-competition events ===
The first four days of the festival consist of free, non–competition events. These include performances by local and international halau at many venues around Hilo, as well as an arts and crafts fair. The Wednesday Ho'ike Night Free exhibition at the Edith Kanakaʻole Stadium is very popular, and often features international hālau from other Pacific islands and Japan, and native or indigenous dancers and dances from locations such as Alaska and New Zealand. A final non–competition event, the Merrie Monarch Parade, takes place on Saturday morning.

=== Hula competition ===
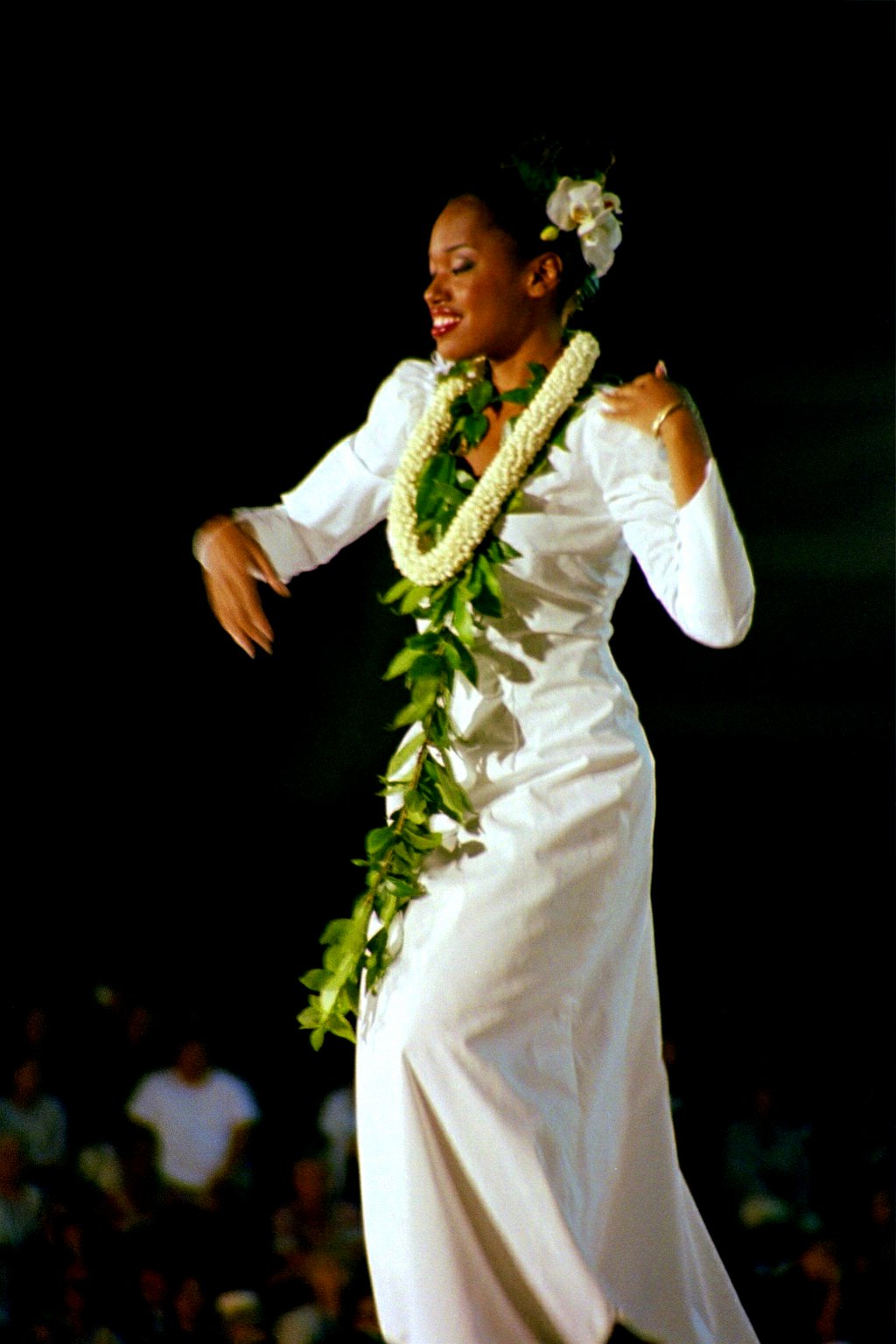
Competitor in the Miss Aloha Hula competition dancing her hula 'auana segment at the 2003 Merrie Monarch festival

The festivities culminate in the annual competitions held at the Edith Kanakaʻole Multipurpose Stadium in Hoʻolulu Park. Dancers perform individually and in groups, with seven minutes allowed for each performance.

==== Miss Aloha Hula ====
Thursday night is the first competition event. Individual female dancers compete for the title of Miss Aloha Hula. Each dancer performs in both traditional (hula kahiko) and modern (hula ʻauana) forms of hula, as well as chant (oli) during their kahiko performance.

Miss Aloha Hula is hula's top solo wahine, or women's, honor. Originally known as Miss Hula, the title was later changed to Miss Aloha Hula. Aloha Dalire, a kumu hula and hula dancer, won the first Miss Aloha Hula under her maiden name, Aloha Wong, in 1971.

The Miss Aloha Hula competition began in 1971. Each hālau may submit one contestant who is 18 to 25 years old and unmarried. Each contestant performs a hula kahiko and hula 'auana. For kahiko, they must perform an oli, ka'i, mele, and ho'i in the 7 minute time limit. No microphones are used for the oli and minimal makeup is applied. They are also judged on their costuming and leis.

==== Group hula kahiko ====
There are two divisions of group competition, the male (kāne) division and the female (wahine) division. Friday night features hālau performing ancient style hula.

==== Group hula ʻauana ====
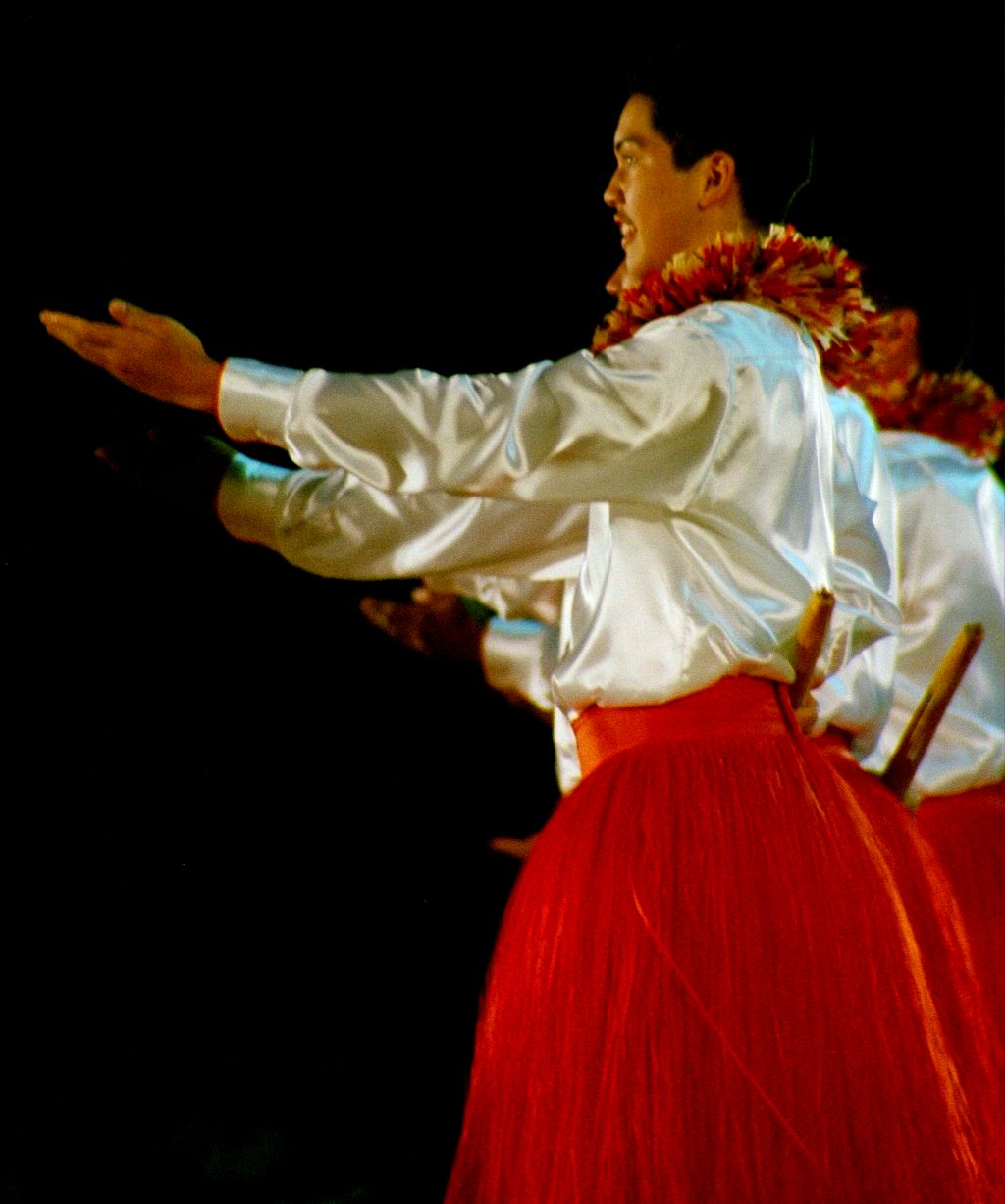
Dancers in the men's hula 'auana competition at the 2003 Merrie Monarch Festival

Saturday night features hālau performing modern style hula. Awards are also announced on Saturday night.

==== Judging criteria ====
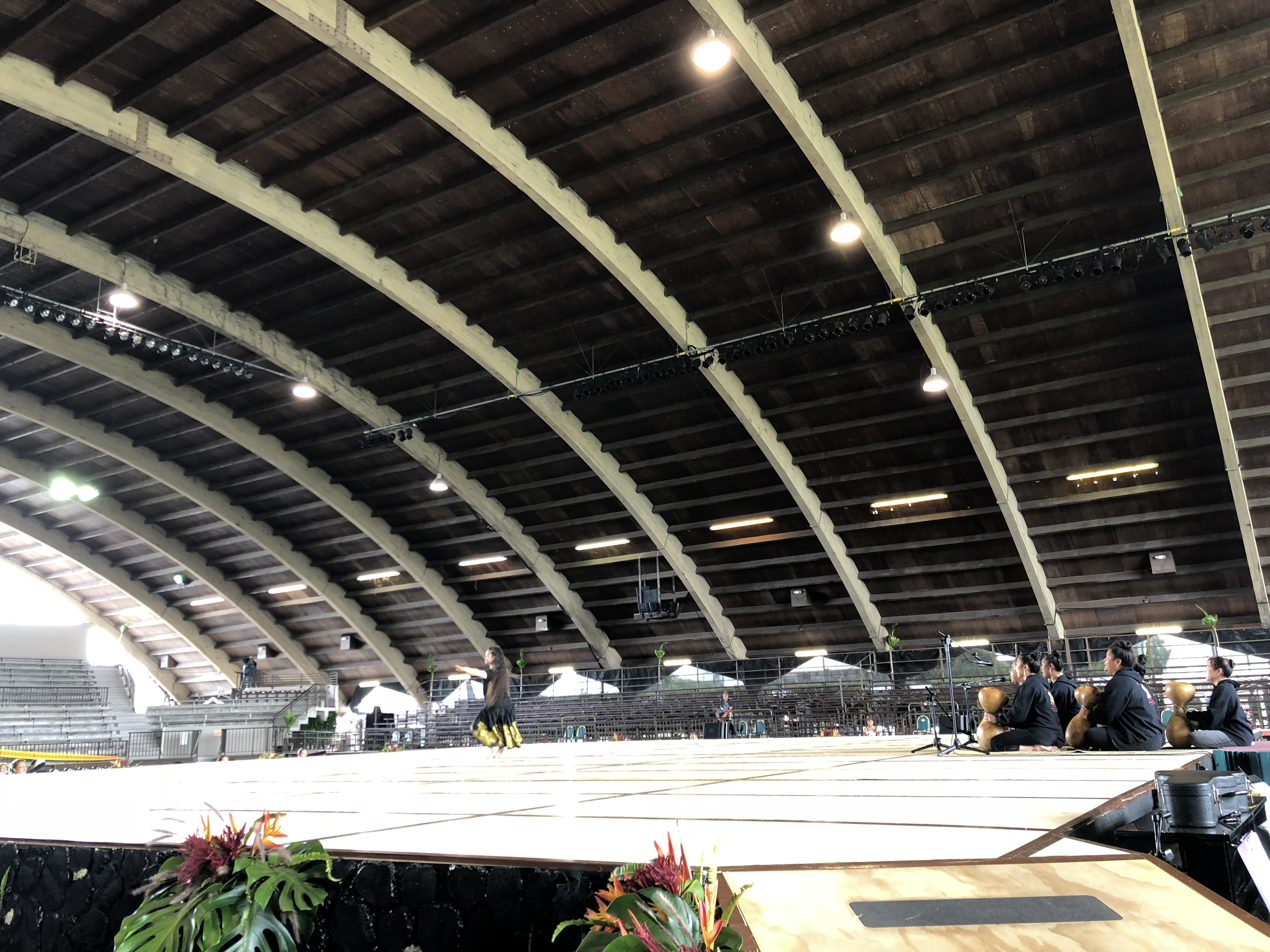
A solo dancer practices for the Miss Aloha Hula kahiko competition on the stage of the Edith Kanakaole Stadium (2019)

During their performances hālau and individuals are judged in a variety of categories. First, there is the entrance (kaʻi). During their chant (oli) and dance (hula), judges look for interpretation of the song being performed, expression of the hula, chant, or song, posture, precision, hand gestures, feet and body movement, grooming, and authenticity of costume and adornments. Finally there is the exit off stage (hoʻi). Performers are scored on each aspect of the performance.

== Cultural impact ==
Many believe that the Merrie Monarch Festival “brought about a renaissance of Hawaiian culture.” The festival identifies four goals related to Hawaiian culture, quoted from their website:

1. Perpetuating the traditional culture of the Hawaiian people;
2. Developing and augmenting a living knowledge of Hawaiian arts and crafts through workshops, demonstrations, exhibitions and performances of the highest quality and authenticity;
3. Reaching those who might not otherwise have the opportunity to participate;
4. Enriching the future lives of all of Hawaii's children

The festival claims that through it, “thousands of people in Hawaii and throughout the world are learning about the history and culture of Hawaii.” The Merrie Monarch Festival “has received worldwide recognition for its historic and cultural significance.”

== Television coverage and web livestream ==
The festival was first broadcast on local TV in 1981, when KITV brought the festival to homes across Hawaii. Coverage began as taped and edited highlight segments and eventually went live. KITV broadcast the festival for 29 years; in 2009, Luana Kawelu, who had recently taken over the job of president of the Merrie Monarch Festival, signed a deal with competitor KFVE to broadcast the festival in 2010 and beyond.

The hula competition is livestreamed for free all three nights on the website of Hawaii News Now, so that persons not living in Hawaii may enjoy it.

== Nā Hiwahiwa O Hawaiʻi festival, Japan ==
For some hālau, the festival does not end after the competition is over. Those who place in the competition are then invited to attend the Nā Hiwahiwa Festival in Tokyo, Japan. This festival includes Merrie Monarch Festival winners and Nā Hōku Hanohano winners. This festival is a celebration of the Hawaiian dancers and singers who received award-winning recognition in these competitions. Japan is one of the biggest supporters in the world of hula and the Hawaiian culture. Japanese hula schools do not compete in the Merrie Monarch Festival, but most of the schools travel to Hilo every year to support the hula hālau and experience the festivities Merrie Monarch has to offer.

== Participants, winners, and judges ==
=== Miss Aloha Hula ===
Key:

1st Place
2nd Place
3rd Place
4th Place
5th Place

1970s

Hālau	Kumu	1979	1978	1977	1976	1975	1974	1973	1972	1971
Hālau Hula O Pukaikapuaokalani	Ellen Castillo	—N/a		Pualani Chang	—N/a					
Hālau ʻO Kahealani		—N/a							Aulani Newalu	—N/a
ʻIlima Hula Studio		—N/a			Ululani Duenas	Leimomi Maria	—N/a			
Johnny Lum Ho Hula Studio	Johnny Lum Ho	—N/a							Dee Dee Aipolani**	—N/a
Kaleo ʻO Nani Loa Studio		—N/a			Cheryl Nalani Guernesy	—N/a				
Keolalaulani Hālau ʻŌlapa O Laka		—N/a	Regina Makaikai Igarashi	—N/a						Aloha Wong
Louise Kaleiki Hula Studio		—N/a						Kalani Kalawa	—N/a	
Pāʻū O Hiʻiaka		Jody Imehana Mitchell	—N/a							
Piilani Watkins Hula Studio		—N/a					Dee Dee Aipolani	—N/a		

1980s

Hālau	Kumu	1989	1988	1987	1986	1985	1984	1983	1982	1981	1980
Hālau Hula ʻO Kahikilaulani	Nāhōkūokalani Gaspang	—N/a	Sheldeen Kaleimomi Kaleohano	—N/a							
Hālau O Ka Ua Kanilehua	Johnny Lum Ho	—N/a		Lisa Kuʻuipo Doi	—N/a			Geola Pua	Dayna Kanani Oda	Brenda Alidon	Kaula Kamahele
Hauʻoli Hula Hālau		—N/a					Twyla Ululani Mendez	—N/a			
Hālau O Nā Maoli Pua		Piʻilani Smith	—N/a								
The Ladies of Keʻala O Ka Lauwaʻe		—N/a			Leimomi Nuuhiwa	Healani Youn	—N/a				

1990s

Hālau	Kumu	1999	1998	1997	1996	1995	1994	1993	1992	1991	1990
Hālau Hula Olana	Howard & Olana Ai	—N/a	Kapiʻolani Lanchenko	—N/a							Natalie Noelani Ai
Hālau Hula ʻO Hokulani	Hokulani De Rego	Leinani Kahikilaulani De Rego	—N/a								
Hālau Hula ʻO Kahikilaulani	Rae Kahiki Fonseca	Misty Mahealani ʻAina*	—N/a								
Hālau Hula ʻO Ka Ua Kāhune		—N/a							Tami Kamaile Nakamura	—N/a	
Hālau Ka Ua Kilihune	Al Makahinu Barcarse	Cyd Laʻie Anahiwa Gaspar	—N/a								
Hālau Ka Waikahe Lani Malie	Kumu Hula Blaine Kamalani Kia	Caroline Rose Kawaemakaleha Julian	—N/a								
Hālau Kealiʻi O Nalani	Kealiʻi Ceballos	Meleokaʻukaʻulele Hiraiwa	—N/a								
Hālau Kealakapawa	Michael Kaʻilipunohu Canopin	Lisa Lei Makaonaona Wuest	Alexandra Makaonaona Obra	—N/a							
Hālau Mōhala ʻIlima	Māpuana de Silva	Dawn Napuaʻala Abrams	—N/a	Kehaulani Enos	—N/a				Liz Madrona	—N/a	
Hālau O Ka Ua Kanilehua	Johnny Lum Ho	—N/a			Pauliann Kaleonani Kekela	—N/a			Napua Greig	—N/a	
Hālau ʻO Ke Ānuenue	Glenn Kelena Vasconcellos	Kelly Lee Kaheanani Wehrsig	—N/a						Karla Kanoelehua Kahawaiolaʻa	—N/a	
Hula Hālau ʻO Kamuela	Kunewa Mook & Kauʻionālani Kamanaʻo	—N/a	Joselyn Leialoha Robins	—N/a							
Ka Pā Hula O Kauanoe O Waʻahila	Mae Ulalia Long Loebenstein	—N/a				Allison Kailihiwa Kahaʻipiʻilani Vaughan	—N/a	Maelia Lani Kahanuola Loebenstein	—N/a		
Kealiʻikaapunihonua Keʻena Aʻo Hula		—N/a			Kuʻukamalani Ho	—N/a					
Keolalaulani Hālau ʻŌlapa O Laka	Aloha Dalire	Keolalaulani Dalire	Kealohapauʻole Hoʻomana*	—N/a					Kauimaiokalaniākea Dalire	Kapualokeokalaniākea Dalire	—N/a
Moana's Hula Halau	Moana Dudoit & Raquel Dudoit	JaimeLyn Kahanakekukuiokalani Pele	—N/a								
Nā Lei O Kaholoku		—N/a							Rebecca Kahikilani Kay	—N/a	
Nā Wai ʻEhā O Puna	O'Brian Eselu & Thaddius Wilson	—N/a	Lokalia Kahele	—N/a			Tracie Kaʻonohilani Farias	—N/a	Tracie Kaʻonohilani Farias	—N/a	

2000s

Hālau	Kumu	2009	2008	2007	2006	2005	2004	2003	2002	2001	2000
Hālau Hoʻola Ka Mana O Hawaiʻi	Frank Keliʻi Chang	—N/a			Anelaokalani Leon-Guerrero	—N/a				Kaylee Kapuananiikekai-hawanawana Weyker	Jacklyn Kapuamakamae Abella
Hālau Hula ʻO Hōkūlani	Hōkūlani & Larry De Rego	—N/a	Leonani Nāhoʻoikaika	—N/a				Brooke Kealahou Takara	—N/a		
Hālau Hula ʻO Kahikilaulani	Rae Kahiki Fonseca	—N/a						Gabrielle Kamalamalamaonalani Yamashita	—N/a		
Hālau Hula ʻO Napunaheleonapua	Rich Pedrina	—N/a			Laura Keʻalaonaona Imai	Laura Keʻalaonaona Imai	—N/a				
Hālau Hula O Pukaikapuaokalani	Ellen Castillo	—N/a	Naomi Piʻilanihoʻo-mālamala-maokalani Klein	—N/a						Kamealoha Elaban-Hall	Kiara Kuʻupualikolehua Cariaga
Hālau Hula Olana	Howard & Olana Ai	Malia Ann Kaleihiwahiwa-onamakua Marks	Ellyse Uʻilani Urabe	Malia Ann Marks	Moanikeʻala Nabarro	—N/a	Kellilynn Kanoelani Cockett Smith	Shelsea Lilia Makanoe Lindsey Ai	Shelsea Lilia Makanoe Lindsey Ai	Noelle Kamealiʻimailani Shiroma	Lauren Leialoha Kanaʻe*
Hālau I Ka Wēkiu	Karl Veto Baker & Michael Casupang	Kiara Masayo Kalehuaikauanoe Wheeler	—N/a		Kaʻenaaloha-okauʻikau-kehakeha Aoe Hopkins*	—N/a	Bianca Keopuolani Rapu Leitel	Kaʻenaaloha-okauʻikau-kehakeha Aoe Hopkins	—N/a		
Hālau Ka Ua Kilihune	Al Makahinu Barcarse	—N/a								Cyd Laʻie Gasper	—N/a
Hālau Ka Liko Pua O Kalaniākea	Kapua Dalire-Moe	Nicole Kehaulani Aki Taniguchi	—N/a								
Hālau Ka Waikahe Lani Malie	Blaine Kamalani Kia	—N/a								Tamra Leilani Porter	Kuʻuleialoha Manya Chun
Hālau Ke Kiaʻi A O Hula	Kapiʻolani Haʻo	—N/a			Stephanie Makalapua Lum Yee	Shanena Kuʻuipookalani Lino	—N/a	Sheena Makalihaliha Lino	Shanena Kuʻuipookalani Lino	Makahilahila Lino	Kuʻuipoʻokalani Lino
Hālau Kealakapawa	Michael Kaʻilipunohu Canopin	—N/a						Wendee Hualani Lim	—N/a		
Hālau Kealiʻi O Nālani	Kealiʻi Ceballos	—N/a	Leilanipuakou Rojas	Leilani Rojas	—N/a		Kaʻimilani Lamorena	—N/a	Hoku Koga	Meleokaʻukaʻulele Hiraiwa	Gillian Akeakamai Odani
Hālau Keʻalaokamaile	Kealiʻi Reichel	Cherissa Henoheanāpua-ikawaokele Kāne*	—N/a								
Hālau Mōhala ʻIlima	Māpuana de Silva	—N/a	Kapalaʻiula de Silva	Erica Kauʻionalani Awana	Kapalaiʻula Kamakaleiakawainui de Silva	Maya Kawailanaokeawaiki Saffery	Natasha Lokelani Lopez*	Mealiʻi Kapiko	Gwendolen Minoʻaka Demesillo	Kahikina de Silva	Mikiʻala Lidstone
Hālau Nā Lei Kaumaka O Uka	Nāpua Greig	—N/a	Ipolei Kaowili	—N/a	Makalani Hanau I Ka Manawa Ua Kipalale Mai Kuahiwi Sarai Pukuna Himsa Franco-Francis	Jennifer Oramanuitaumaiterai Brault*	Trina Lee Kawailehua Perkins	—N/a			
Hālau Nā Mamo O Kaʻala	Tiare Noelani Chang	Ashley Kananioalapaʻi Artis	Janelle Emalia Pōhainaniokauanoe Chang	—N/a					Dawn ʻAnelalani Lleces	Erika Kanani Kealoha	—N/a
Hālau Nā Mamo O Puʻuanahulu	William Kahakuleilehua Haunuʻu Sonny Ching/Lōpaka Igarta-DeVera	Kaholo Kahikipiʻilani Pānui	Julie ʻIlikea Afong	—N/a		Maile Emily Kauʻilani-onāpuaehiʻi-poiokeānuenue-okeola Francisco	Natasha Mahealani Akau*	Jennifer Kehaulani Oyama*	—N/a		
Hālau O Ka Hanu Lehua	Carlson Kamaka Kukona III	Gerilyn Snow Emata	—N/a	Mieko Mahealani Treaster	—N/a						
Hālau O Ka Ua Kanilehua	Johnny Lum Ho	—N/a						Chrissy Noelani Kama	Kasie Puahala Kaleohano	Natasha Kamalamalama-okalailoko-kapuʻuwaime-hanaokekeiki-punahele Oda	—N/a
Halau O Ke ʻAʻaliʻi Ku Makani	Manu Boyd	—N/a		Bianca Uaʻimaikalani Meheula	—N/a	Kaiwipunikauikawekiu Punihei Anthony	—N/a				
Hālau O Ke Ānuenue	Glenn Kelena Vasconcellos	—N/a			Sharay Uemura	Rashanti Kiana ʻAʻaliʻi Kaʻawaloa	Jadelyn Mokihana Kalaukoa	—N/a			Jennifer Kehaulani Wehrsig
Hālau O Lilinoe	Sissy Kaio & Lilinoe Kaio	—N/a	Edyann Heʻaliʻionālani Stanley-Gore	—N/a							
Hālau O Nā Pua Kukui	Ed Collier	—N/a			Aisha Kilikina Kanoelani Valmoja	—N/a		Devynne Ellysse Kum Ung Leihokumainalani Sue	—N/a	Darmaine Noriko Hokulani Taba	—N/a
Hula Hālau ʻO Kamuela	Kunewa Mook & Kauʻionālani Kamanaʻo	C'ari Mae Kawailehua Kealoha	Aureana Kamaliʻioʻiwalani Tseu	Aureana Kamaliʻioʻiwalani Tseu	Sharde Kamalamalamaonalani Mersberg	Jasmine Helena Orlando	—N/a	Melanie Lehua Kim	Malia Ann Kawailanamalie Petersen*	—N/a	Tehani Kealamailani Gonzado
Hula Hālau ʻO Lilinoe	Sissy Lilinoe Kaio	—N/a			Faye Lei Uʻi Brigoli	—N/a			Nicole Kaʻaleʻa Riveira	—N/a	
Hula Halau O Moana	Moana & Raquel Dudoit	—N/a					Joy Chiemi Kaholomoana Espiritu	—N/a			
Hula Hālau Nā Lei O Kaholokū		—N/a			Bernice Alohanamakana-maikalanimai Davis-Lim	—N/a					
Ka Leo O Laka I Ka Hikina O Ka La	Kumu Hula Kaleo Trinidad	—N/a			Tatiana Kawehiokalani Miu Lan Tseu	Jeri-Lynn Kealolahilahi Koko	—N/a				
Ka Lā ʻŌnohi Mai O Haʻehaʻe	Tracie & Keawe Lopes	Maria Kaʻiulani Kanehailua	—N/a								
Ka Pā Hula O Ka Lei Lehua	Snowbird Puananiopaoakalani Bento	—N/a			Bianca Kulia Kaleinani Costa	Cherish Kahikahiwaokalani Kama	—N/a				
Ka Pā Hula O Kamehameha	Holoua Stender	—N/a						Hiʻileiokalani Costa	Malia Hiʻiakaikawenaokeao Stender	Snowbird Puananiopaoakalani Bento*	—N/a
Ka Pā Hula O Kauanoe O Waʻahila	Maelia Loebenstein-Carter	—N/a		Keonilei Kuʻuwehiokalā Kaniaupio Fairbanks*	Carly Makanani Ah Sing	—N/a		Laura Leialiʻiokalani-hekilimakani-lunaonapali Manoʻi*	—N/a		
Kanoʻeau Dance Academy	Keʻala Kukona	—N/a					Cialyn Thara Kawahineikuliakauʻi Broclic Kukona-Pacheco	Cialyn Thara Kawahineikuliakauʻi Broclic Kukona-Pacheco	—N/a		
Kawailiʻulā	Chinky Māhoe	—N/a									Vonn Hanaloia Gerona
Ke Kai O Kahiki	Laʻakea Perry & O'Brian Eselu	—N/a	Kristy Ann Kuʻuipouʻiokalani Perez-Kaiwi	—N/a			Nicole Eleanor Moani Taylor Schmidt	—N/a			Erica Lauren Duran
Kealiʻikaʻapunihonua Keʻena Aʻo Hula	Leimomi Ho	—N/a							Lehuanani Young	—N/a	
Keolalaulani Hālau ʻŌlapa O Laka	Aloha Dalire	Pōhaikauʻilani Ann Nuʻuhiwa	Kalimakuhilani Akemi Kalāmanamana Suganuma*	Jhameel Lewalani Sachiko Duarte	—N/a	Pohaikauʻilani Ann Nuʻuhiwa	—N/a	Lauren Teani Kahiwahiwa Buchner	Leiʻoheloʻulaokalaniopele K. K. Hewett	—N/a	Mavis Aliʻimanukai Kanei
Nani Ola Hawaiian Dance Company	Kanani Pharr-Cadaoas	—N/a		Melanie Makaonaona Kakaio	—N/a						
Nā Hula O Kaohikukapulani	Kapu Kinimaka Alquiza	Kristi Keahiapele Celebrado	—N/a	Amanda Puamohala Weinstein	—N/a	Jona Makaonaona Scott	—N/a	Kara Leionani Chow*	—N/a	Eileen Maihiokalani Estenzo	—N/a
Nā Punua O Kauaʻi	Wallace & Shanna Punua	—N/a									Keiʻalohionalani Katherine Punua
Puamana Hula Studio	Puluelo Park	—N/a							Malia Koʻiʻulaokawaolehua Bird	—N/a	
Pukalani Hula Hale	Nina Maxwell & Hiʻilei Maxwell-Juan	—N/a							Anne Matsumoto	—N/a	Miki Kamalei Tokunaga

2010s

Hālau	Kumu	2019	2018	2017	2016	2015	2014	2013	2012	2011	2010
Academy of Hawaiian Arts	Mark Kealiʻi Hoʻomalu	—N/a			Jazzlyn Kawailani Y.P. Kaleohano	—N/a					
Hālau Hiʻiakaināmakalehua	Robert Keʻano Kaʻupu IV & Lono Padilla	Taizha Keakealani Hughes-Kaluhiokalani*	Nicole Mailenani Yuen	Kelina Kiyoko Keʻanoʻilehua Tiffany Eldredge	Kayli Kaʻiulani Carr	Abby Claire Haliʻahauola Resulta	Tiana Makanao-kealiʻimakamae Kuni	—N/a			
Hālau Hula ʻO Kahikilaulani	Nāhōkūokalani Gaspang	Kiana Kaheanani Costa	—N/a					Hōkūlani Kaiola McKeague	—N/a		Ashlyn Aulani Tavares
Hālau Hula Ka Lehua Tuahine	Kaʻilihiwa Vaughan-Darval	Mami Kapiʻinaakalā Erica Ogiwara	—N/a								
Hālau Hula O Pukaikapuaokalani	Ellen Castillo	—N/a									Deizsa Kealohielike-mekalaikeawakea Moniz
Hālau Hula Olana	Howard & Olana Ai, and Shelsea Ai Apana	Breann Kamakaokalani Sachiko Brewer	—N/a			Alyssa Marie Kuʻulaniopuʻu Mitsuko Akiyama	Alyssa Marie Kuʻulaniopuʻu Mitsuko Akiyama	—N/a	Jazmine Janee Kauʻionālani Albalos	—N/a	
Hālau I Ka Wēkiu	Karl Veto Baker & Michael Casupang	—N/a	Shenaniah Kuʻuleiʻawapuhi-melemelenaanuhea Romias	—N/a				Whitney Piʻilani Baldwin Schneider-Furuya	Sarah Kamaleialohai-kapolionāmākua Noyle	Ronnie Nanea Esuko Oda	—N/a
Hālau Ka Lei Mokihana O Leināʻala	Leināʻala Pavao Jardin	—N/a		Amanda Hiwalei Aliser	Brylyn Noelani ʻAiwohi*	Jayna Marie Kauʻiokalanimālie Shaffer	Nicole Nalani Ishibashi	—N/a	Jayna Kauʻiokalanimālie Shaffer	—N/a	
Hālau Ka Liko Pua O Kalaniākea	Kapua Dalire-Moe	Tasha Kauluwehiokalani Ah Quin-Soren	Shayla Makanoe Mie Thompson	Leilani Nicole Wilson	Ashley Kilioulaninuiamamao-hoʻopiʻiwahinekapualoke-okalaniakea Lai	—N/a			Desire Likeloanani O Makuahine DeSilva	Chantelle Lindsey Kauʻinohea Suʻa	—N/a
Hālau Kealiʻi O Nālani	Kealiʻi Ceballos	—N/a								Kanani Yamashita-Iida	Lekili Tanaka
Hālau Keʻalaokamaile	Kealiʻi Reichel	—N/a								Tori Hulali Canha	Oralani Koa*
Hālau Kekuaokalāʻauʻalaʻiliahi	Haunani & ʻIliahi Paredes	Kaʻimilani Marie Corpuz	Meagan Puanani Guerrero	Leimakamae Maura Kea	Christie Mariko Keahonui Kimura	Kelsey Marie Kuʻulei Miliama Haina Galago	Kamalani Kaleimomi Kahalepoli Kawaʻa	Sloane Makana West	Tiana-Lynn Nālani Manuel	—N/a	
Hālau Manaola	Nani Lim Yap	—N/a	Asialynn Genoa Kalihilihiʻulaonā-lehuaʻohōpoe Yap	—N/a							
Hālau Mōhala ʻIlima	Māpuana de Silva	—N/a					Sarah Kapuahelani Sterling	Elizabeth Pualani Steele	Rebecca Lilinoekekapa-hauomaunakea Sterling	Makanani Akiona	Christina Mahinakauahiahi Gamayo
Hālau Nā Lei Hiwahiwa ʻO Kuʻualoha	Sammye Kuʻualoha Young	—N/a					Melia Kauʻikeonalani Carmen Taganas	—N/a			
Hālau Nā Lei Kaumaka O Uka	Nāpua Greig	—N/a	Shalia Kapuauʻionālani Kikuyo Kamakaokalani	Miriam Anuhea Kamakanaokealoha Hokoana Arakawa	Kamie-Lei Kāhealani Yoshiko Fujiwara	ʻĀnela Uʻilani Ruth Fusano Tanigawa	Hulali Kaʻimiʻāina Ciera De Lima	Manalani Mili Hokoana English*	—N/a	Manalani Mili Hokoana English	Jade Kealani Snow
Hālau Nā Mamo O Puʻuanahulu	William Kahakuleilehua Haunuʻu Sonny Ching/Lōpaka Igarta-DeVera	Shirell Kuʻupuamakamae Holokai Paro	Kinohi Kealohilani Mirafuentes	—N/a	Brandi Nālani Morales	Pualani Armstrong	Amber Kanoelani Rosenberg	—N/a			Ashlynne Kahoapilianakupuna Jingao
Hālau O Ka Hanu Lehua	Carlson Kamaka Kukona III	Kalena Kawohikūkapulani Young Hoʻopiʻi	—N/a	Leila Noelani Kuʻuleimomi Rodrigues	—N/a						
Hālau O Ka Ua Kanilehua	Johnny Lum Ho	—N/a	Alana Maureen Kaʻanoʻanookalani Paiva	—N/a	Kayshlyn Keauliʻimailani Victoria De Sa	—N/a		Kayshlyn Keauliʻimailani Victoria De Sa	—N/a		Taysha-Lei Kapuauʻioka-lehuamamomaeʻole De Sa
Hālau O Ke Ānuenue	Glenn Kelena Vasconcellos	—N/a						Kelsey Kauluwehiokauanoe Iyo	—N/a	Stephanie Puakea Whitehall	—N/a
Hālau O Lilinoe	Sissy Kaio & Lilinoe Kaio	—N/a									Maile Ualani Haili Stant
Hālau O Nā Pua Kukui	Ed Collier	—N/a						Jaimie Elizabeth Kapuauʻionālani Kennedy	Jaimie Elizabeth Kapuauʻionālani Kennedy	—N/a	
Hālau O Poʻohala		Krisella Leilani Gabriele Beamer Solomon	—N/a				Leiomālama Tamasese Solomon	—N/a			
Hula Hālau ʻO Kamuela	Kunewa Mook & Kauʻionālani Kamanaʻo	Alyssa Ayumi Kaʻimilani Dolbeare	Paoakalani Ashley Montgomery	Julyen Machiko Kaloke Kaluna	ʻAulani Kameaʻiʻomakamae Latorre-Holt	Jasmine Kaleihiwa Dunlap*	Asia Leolani Haʻaheoʻoluaipo Makaʻawaʻawa	Jasmine Kaleihiwa Dunlap	Shaunté Carolyn Leialoha Nobriga	Chelsea Kēhaulani Tacub	Māhealani Mika Hirao-Solem
Hula Hālau O Kou Lima Nani	Iwalani Kalima	—N/a	Joelle Nohealani Kalima	—N/a							
Ka Lā ʻŌnohi Mai O Haʻehaʻe	Tracie & Keawe Lopes	Lindsey Kahiehielaunaʻole Miwa Ching	Ecstasy Jetta Laverne Kamakalikolehua Ligon*	Ariana Kaʻanoʻikehaikūlōʻihia Kaliliokū Akaka	Ecstasy Jetta Laverne Kamakalikolehua Ligon	Noelani Dudoit	Keʻalohilani Tara Eliga Serrao*	Chalei Malianapuaonahala Puʻulei McKee	Brandi Puʻuwainani Hart	Maria Kaʻiulani Kanehailua	Mahina Macfarlane
Ka Leo O Laka I Ka Hikina O Ka Lā	Kaleo Trinidad	—N/a				Tifeni Gene Ann Kanoe Elvenia	—N/a		Summer Malamaisaua Kawailana Manuma	Tiana Makanao-kealiʻimakamae Kuni	Delys Hulalimaikalanimai Kanemura Recca
Ka Pā Hula O Ka Lei Lehua	Snowbird Puananiopaoakalani Bento	—N/a						Jessica Keʻalohilani Barut	Shawna Pihanakalani Kwai Nun Kapana	Puanani Ashley Reis-Moniz*	—N/a
Ka Pā Hula O Kauanoe O Waʻahila	Maelia Loebenstein Carter	—N/a		Ashlyn Kahelelani Maʻa	—N/a			ʻAnoʻileʻa Huali Clemente	Keahiahi Sharon Long*	ʻĀnela Marie Kawehikulaonālani Evans	—N/a
Kawailiʻulā	Chinky Māhoe	Maile Yurika Garrett	Maile Yurika Garrett	Chelei Kameleonālani Kahalewai	—N/a						
Keʻena Aʻo Hula	Leimomi Ho	Kealohilani Gardner Kealiʻikaʻapunihonua	—N/a			Tiffany Kulani DeSilva	—N/a				
Keolalaulani Hālau ʻŌlapa O Laka	Aloha Dalire & Keola Dalire	—N/a				Tiana Kehaulani Arrocena Soares	Ashley Kilioulaninuiamamao-hoʻopiʻiwahinekapualoke-okalaniakea Lai	—N/a			Brittainy Catherine ʻIolani Suʻa
Moana's Hula Hālau	Raquel Dudoit & Valerie Dudoit-Temahaga	—N/a			Ceriann Akemi Moana Espiritu	Larriley Kehaulani Kaleonahe Kekahuna Rawlins	—N/a				
Nā Pua Me Kealoha	Sissy Kaio & Lilinoe McCormack	—N/a					Jessica Hiʻiakaikalikoʻokeʻaʻaliʻi Osorio	—N/a			Maile Ualani Haili Stant
Pukalani Hula Hale	Hiʻilei Maxwell-Juan	—N/a			Ashley Leināʻala Juan	—N/a					

2020s

Hālau	Kumu	2026	2025	2024	2023	2022	2021
Hālau Hiʻiakaināmakalehua	Robert Keʻano Kaʻupu IV (& Lono Padilla before 2026)	Keoe Momilani Michiko Hoe	Marina Laʻakea Choi	Lilia Asayo McCabe Takahashi	—N/a	Marina Laʻakea Choi	—N/a
Hālau Hula O Kauhionāmauna	Kumu Hula Theresa Kauhionāmauna Ramento Tehiva	—N/a	Kasidee Nadine Kuʻuleialoha Teixeira	—N/a			
Hālau Hula ʻO Kahikilaulani	Nāhōkūokalani Gaspang	—N/a	Keʻalohilani Na Kealohamoa Narelle Lee Yuk Lan Kama-Hosea	—N/a			
Hālau Hula ʻO Nāpunaheleonāpua	Rich Pedrina	—N/a					Kaleikaumaka Destiny Kaimanaimolii Bartolome Cruz
Hālau Hula Ka Lehua Tuahine	Kaʻilihiwa Vaughan-Darval	—N/a	Tiare-Jennings Iwalani Kamaluoluokatuahine Rebecca Kaʻaumoana Vaughan-Darval	Kayla Sachi Celades	Tayla-Nohealeimamo Kamaehukauikapono Taʻuhere Vaughan-Darval	—N/a	
Hālau I Ka Wēkiu	Karl Veto Baker & Michael Casupang	Samantha Makanani Aguon Newman	—N/a	Līhau ʻĪmaikalani Ichinose	—N/a		
Hālau Ka Lehua Pua Kamaehu	Kasie Puahala Kaleohano & Brandi Nohelani Barrett	—N/a		Chianti Kamailekaluhea Motta	Tehani Kaleohoneonālani Barrett	—N/a	
Hālau Ka Lei Mokihana O Leināʻala	Leināʻala Pavao Jardin	Jelacia Naomi Waiauokalaniākea Peralta	Jaedyn Janae Puahaulani Pavao*	Heleolanimaināmakaohāʻena Hailee Jo Yokotake	Breeze Ann Kalehuaonālani Vidinha Pavao	—N/a	
Hālau Ka Liko Pua O Kalaniākea	Kapua Dalire-Moe	Mālie Kapuaonaonaikamauʻuuaolalokoikealohaokalaniākea Moe	Taylor Kahaukapu Serikawa	—N/a	Jazmine Nohealani Adams-Clarke	Manaia Kawaipua-makanakauʻikawēkiume-kanoeuʻiokeolamaikalaniākea Dalire-Moe	Ashley Kilioulaninuiamamao-hoopiiwahinekapualoke-okalaniakea Lai
Hālau Kalaʻakeakauikawēkiu	Kenneth Dean Alohapumehanaokalā Victor	Līlianani Maya Rae Pi	—N/a		Pōlaʻa Kalaniʻelima Yim	Shyla Hehāliʻaalohapūlamakeolalani Victor	—N/a
Hālau Kealiʻi O Nalani	Kealiʻi Ceballos	—N/a	Kahōkūliʻiliʻi Tanaka	—N/a			
Hālau Kekuaokalāʻauʻalaʻiliahi	Haunani & ʻIliahi Paredes	Faith Kealohapauʻole Paredes*	Lexi Mae Kamakanaokalani Pruse	Amedée Kauakohemālamalama Conley-Kapoi	Karlee Pōhaikealoha Rita Chong Kee	Kyleigh Hōkūao Manuel-Sagon	—N/a
Hālau Lilia Makanoe	Shelsea Lilia Ai	—N/a		Keʻala Kaleinanihoʻopulakaumakamauloa Cabison-Kahoʻonei	—N/a	Renee Maile Eveliga Kaikaina Tataipu	—N/a
Hālau Nā Lei Kaumaka O Uka	Nāpua Greig Silva	Leimana Kaleinamanu Purdy	—N/a	Shayla Angeline Kamalei Ballesteros	Pōhaikealoha Olikolani Artates	—N/a	
Hālau Nā Mamo O Puʻuanahulu	William Kahakuleilehua Haunuʻu Sonny Ching/Lōpaka Igarta-DeVera	Haily Kamakahukilani Nawahine Nascimento	—N/a	Caly Ann Kamōʻīwahineokaimana Ragonton Domingo	Meleana Kamalani Mirafuentes*	—N/a	
Hālau O Ka Hanu Lehua	Carlson Kamaka Kukona III	—N/a			Jill-Lyan Makanaokalani Mae-Ling Mamizuka	Riann Nālani Michiko Fujihara	Cierra Mei-Ling Hauʻolimaikalani Pagaduan Chow
Hula Hālau ʻO Kamuela	Kunewa Mook & Kauʻionālani Kamanaʻo	Jovian Kauanoeokalaulani Range-Semisi	Chloe Makanaleiliʻiliʻi Rei Cummins	Nāhakuʻelua ʻĀpuakēhau Kekauoha	Jeʻani-Jade Kalamaolaikapohakea Pavao	Auliʻionāpualokekūonaona Jon-Marie Hisayo Faurot	—N/a
Ka Lā ʻŌnohi Mai O Haʻehaʻe	Tracie & Keawe Lopes	Lahela Hoʻokela Medina Maio	—N/a	Kaʻōnohikaumakaakeawe Kananiokeakua Holokai Lopes*	Agnes Renee Leihiwahiwai-kapolionāmakua Thronas Brown	Piʻikea Kekīhenelehuawewehiikekauʻōnohi Lopes*	Rosemary Kaʻimilei Keamoai-Strickland
Ka Pā Hula O Ka Lei Lehua	Snowbird Puananiopaoakalani Bento	—N/a	Kilinoe Kimura	—N/a			
Kawaiʻulaokalā	Keliʻihoʻomalu Puchalski	Hiʻileilanikauakapukapuokeānuenue Puchalski	Sierra Michelle Lulani Moniz	—N/a		Hiʻilei Lanikauakapukapuokeānuenue Puchalski	Crishelle Kaleiohōkū Young
Kawailiʻulā	Chinky Māhoe	—N/a				Moanikeʻala Fiafia Irene Silva	Moanikeʻala Fiafia Irene Silva
Ke Kai O Kahiki	Laʻakea Perry	—N/a	Makaʻala Kahikinaokalālani Victoria Perry	—N/a			Makaʻala Kahikinaokalālani Victoria Perry*
Keolalaulani Hālau ʻŌlapa O Laka	Keola Dalire	Kēhaulani Kaleikaumakamaeʻiʻomakamae Rubonal	Emalia Pomaialoha KeleihanupīkakeiāPāʻoaehulaleʻaikalaninuiākea Dalire	—N/a	Eva Rose Keaoʻōpuaikalaʻi Espinoza	—N/a	
Nā Pualei O Likolehua	Niuliʻi Heine Kapālama	Lilia Kaleialohaokealohalani Ka’ōnohi’ula Keohokapuakeakua Iokepa-Guerrero	—N/a	Kamalupawehi Abad	—N/a		
Pua Aliʻi ʻIlima	Vicky Holt Takamine & Jeff Takamine	—N/a			Nicole Mei Lan Kaleihiwaokealiʻiokaloa Takamine	—N/a	

Notes:

- * denotes Winner of the Hawaiian Language Award
- ** denotes winner that was later disqualified because she was too young

=== Hālau ===
Hālau may participate in the Wahine or Kāne divisions, or both. For each division, they must perform a group kahiko and ʻauana.

Color key

Competed in Wahine & Miss Aloha Hula	Competed in Kāne & Miss Aloha Hula	Competed in Wahine & Kāne & Miss Aloha Hula	Competed in Wahine	Competed in Kāne	Competed in Wahine & Kāne	Competed in Miss Aloha Hula

# = Nth Place Wahine # = Nth Place Kāne O = Overall K = Kahiko A = ʻAuana M = Miss Aloha Hula

Hālau	Kumu	Location	2024	2023	2022	2021	2019	2018	2017	2016	2015	2014	2013	2012	2011	2010	2009	2008
Academy of Hawaiian Arts	Mark Kealiʻi Hoʻomalu	Oakland, CA		—N/a											—N/a			
Beamer-Solomon Hālau O Poʻohala	Hulali Solomon-Covington	Kohala, Hawaiʻi	—N/a					—N/a					—N/a				—N/a	
Hālau ʻO Lilinoe	Sissy Kaio & Lilinoe Kaio	Carson, California	—N/a					—N/a										
Hālau Hiʻiakaināmakalehua	Robert Keʻano Kaʻupu IV & Lono Padilla	Kalihi Kai, Oʻahu	1O 1K 2A	1A 1A	5K 4A 2O 2K 3A 3M	1K 3O 2K	3A 1M	1K 3M	1O 1K 1M	3K 1M	2M		—N/a					
Hālau Hula ʻO Hōkūlani	Hōkūlani & Larry De Rego	Waipahu, Oʻahu	—N/a										—N/a			—N/a		
Hālau Hula ʻO Kahikilaulani	Nāhōkūokalani Gaspang	Hilo, Hawaiʻi	—N/a		—N/a		1A	—N/a	2K	1K 2A	3K** 2A	2A	4A 3O 4K 3A	—N/a				—N/a
Hālau Hula ʻO Nāpunaheleonāpua	Rich Pedrina	Kāneʻohe, Oʻahu & Hilo, Hawaiʻi	—N/a				—N/a					—N/a						
Hālau Hula Ka Lehua Tuahine	Kaʻilihiwa Vaughan-Darval*	Mānoa, Oʻahu	4K 5A	3K 5A	5A	—N/a					1A				—N/a			
Hālau Hula Kauluokalā	Uluwehi Guerrero	Kahului, Maui			—N/a													
Hālau Hula Ke ʻOlu Makani O Mauna Loa	Meleana Manuel	Kīlauea Volcano, Hawaiʻi	—N/a				—N/a											
Hālau Hula Lani Ola	Puanani Jung	Laguna Hills, CA	—N/a			—N/a							—N/a					
Hālau Hula Nā Pua Uʻi O Hawaiʻi	Etua Lopes		—N/a											—N/a				
Hālau Hula O Kaleimomi	Sheldeen Kaleimomi Haleamau*		—N/a												—N/a			—N/a
Hālau Hula O Kauhionāmauna	Theresa Kauhionāmauna Ramento Tehiva	Waipahu, Oʻahu			—N/a	—N/a					—N/a							
Hālau Hula O Keola-Aliʻiokekai	Iola Balubar		—N/a															
Hālau Hula O Pukaikapuaokalani	Ellen Castillo		—N/a															
Hālau Hula Olana	Howard & Olana Ai, and Shelsea Ai Apana	Puʻuloa, Oʻahu	—N/a									5A	5K					
Hālau I Ka Wēkiu	Karl Veto Baker & Michael Casupang	Pauoa, Oʻahu		—N/a		5A 4O 3K 3A	4A	5A 4K 4A	1A	—N/a		5K 4K	2A 5M	1O 1K 1A				—N/a
Hālau Ka Lehua Pua Kamaehu	Kasie Puahala Kaleohano & Brandi Nohelani Barrett	Hilo, Hawaiʻi			—N/a													
Hālau Ka Lei Mokihana O Leināʻala	Leināʻala Pavao Jardin	Kalāheo, Kauaʻi	2O 2O 2K 2A 4M	3O 3O 5K 2A 2M	1O 1O 1K 1A	4O 5K 3A	5A	3K 2A	3K 4M	2M	4M	4A 5M	3K		—N/a			
Hālau Ka Liko Pua O Kalaniākea	Kapua Dalire-Moe*	Kāneʻohe, Oʻahu				3O 2O 2K 2A 2M					5K	—N/a						
Hālau Kalaʻakeakauikawēkiu	Kenneth Dean Alohapumehanaokalā Victor	Kona, Hawaiʻi	—N/a					—N/a										
Hālau Kawaihoa	Greg Lontayao		—N/a															
Hālau Ke Kiaʻi A ʻO Hula	Kapiʻolani Haʻo		—N/a											—N/a				
Hālau Kealiʻi O Nālani	Kealiʻi Ceballos	Los Angeles, CA	—N/a						—N/a		—N/a							
Hālau Keʻalaokamaile	Kealiʻi Reichel		—N/a												1O 1K 1M	1O 1K 1A	1M	—N/a ku
Hālau Kekuaokalāʻauʻalaʻiliahi	Haunani & ʻIliahi Paredes	Wailuku, Maui	3O 3K 3A 2M	1O 1K 4A	2K 1O 1K 1A	2O 1O 3K 1A 2O 2A	3O 3O 4K 1A 3M	2K 2A				4A	2K 4A 2M		—N/a			
Hālau Keolakapuokalani	Drake Keolakapu Dudoit Delaforcé	Āliamanu & Nānākuli, Oʻahu						—N/a										
Hālau Kiawekūpono O Ka Ua	Ulukoa Duhaylonsod	Honokai Hale, Pukaua, Honouliuli, Oʻahu	—N/a		—N/a													
Hālau Lilia Makanoe	Shelsea Lilia Ai	ʻAiea, Oʻahu				—N/a												
Hālau Manaola	Nani Lim Yap	Kohala, Hawaiʻi	—N/a					4M		2K	—N/a							
Hālau Mōhala ʻIlima	Māpuana de Silva	Kaʻohao, Oʻahu	5K** 3A			—N/a	3K	4K	4K	2A		4K 3M	1O 1K 3A	1A 1M				
Hālau Nā Kamalei O Līlīlehua	Robert Uluwehionāpuaikawēkiuokalani Cazimero	Honolulu, Oʻahu	—N/a								1O 2K 1A	—N/a						
Hālau Nā Lei Hiwahiwa ʻO Kuʻualoha	Sammye Kuʻualoha Young		—N/a										—N/a					
Hālau Nā Lei Kaumaka O Uka	Nāpua Greig	Waiohuli, Maui	5K**		—N/a			1O 1O 2K 1A 1M	5K 5M		2K 2A 5M	2O 2K 3A	1M	—N/a				
Hālau Nā Mamo O Kaʻala	Tiare Noelani Chang		—N/a												—N/a			
Hālau Nā Mamo O Puʻuanahulu	William Kahakuleilehua Haunuʻu Sonny Ching/Lōpaka Igarta-DeVera	Kapahulu, Oʻahu	2O 2K 1A 5M	2O 2O 2K 3A 2O 2K 3A 3M	3K 4A	—N/a	2K 3K 2A 4M	3K 3A	—N/a	1O 4K 5A 1O 3K 1A	4K 3A 5K 4A	3O 3K 3A 4M	—N/a				1O 1K 1A	1K 1A
Hālau Nā Pua ʻO Waiolama	Emery Liʻiliʻiokalani Aceret	Hilo, Hawaiʻi	—N/a									—N/a				—N/a		
Hālau O Ka Hanu Lehua	Carlson Kamaka Kukona III	Waikapū, Maui						4A			—N/a							
Hālau O Ka Ua Kanilehua	Johnny Lum Ho	Hilo, Hawaiʻi	—N/a						—N/a	1O 1K 1A 5M	—N/a			—N/a			—N/a	
Hālau O Ke Ānuenue	Glenn Kelena Vasconcellos	Hilo, Hawaiʻi	—N/a									—N/a		—N/a			—N/a	
Hālau o ke ʻAʻaliʻi Kū Makani	Manuʻaikohana Boyd		—N/a											1O 1K		—N/a		
Hālau O Nā Pua Kukui	Ed Collier		—N/a													—N/a		
Healani's Hula Hālau & Music Academy	Beverly Healani Sun Lan Apana Muraoka		—N/a											—N/a				
Hula Hālau ʻO Kamuela	Kunewa Mook & Kauʻionālani Kamanaʻo	Kalihi & Waimānalo, Oʻahu	3O 3O 1K 4A 3M	4K	3O 3K 3A 2M	—N/a	1O 1K 2A 5M	5K 3A	2M	4A 4M	1O 1K 4A 1M	3O 3K 1A	2O 2K 2A 3M		1A	1M	1A	1K 1A
Hula Hālau O Kou Lima Nani	Iwalani Kalima	Keaukaha, Hawaiʻi	—N/a								—N/a							
ʻIlima Hula Studio	Lani-Girl Kaleiki-Ahlo		—N/a												—N/a			
Ka Lā ʻŌnohi Mai O Haʻehaʻe	Tracie* & Keawe Lopes	Puʻahuʻula, Koʻolaupoko, Oʻahu	1O 1O 3K 1A 4K 4A 1M	1O 1O 1K 4A 3K 1M	2O 4K 2A 1M	4O 3O 4K 4A 1M	5K 2M	2M	1O 1O 2K 1A	5K 3A 3M	3K 5A 3M	1O 1K 1A 1M	4K 4A 4M					—N/a
Ka Leo O Laka I Ka Hikina O Ka Lā	Kaleo Trinidad	Honolulu, Oʻahu	—N/a	3O 4K 2A	—N/a		1O 1K	1O 1K 1A	—N/a		1K 3A	1O 2K 1A			1A		—N/a	
Ka Pā Hula O Ka Lei Lehua	Snowbird Puananiopaoakalani Bento		—N/a							—N/a							—N/a	
Ka Pā Hula O Kauanoe O Waʻahila	Maelia Loebenstein Carter*		—N/a							—N/a						—N/a		
Ka Pā Nani ʻO Lilinoe	Lilinoe Lindsey		—N/a												—N/a			
Kawaiʻulaokalā	Keliʻihoʻomalu Puchalski	Kalaepōhaku, Oʻahu			4K	4K	4K 3A		4K	—N/a								
Kawailiʻulā	Chinky Māhoe	Kailua & Mānoa, Oʻahu	—N/a		3O 2A	1O 1O 1K 1A	2O 2K 4A	5M	1O 1K 3M	4K 4A	3K**	1K	1O 1K 1A					
Ke Kai O Kahiki	Laʻakea Perry	Waiʻanae, Oʻahu		—N/a		4A 3M			3K	2K 3A			3K	—N/a	1O 1K	1O 1K 1A	1O 1K	
Keʻena Aʻo Hula	Leimomi Ho	Pālolo, Oʻahu	—N/a					—N/a				—N/a		—N/a				
Keʻala ʻO Kamailelauliʻiliʻi	H. Kamaile Hamada	Federal Way, WA	—N/a		—N/a				—N/a									
Keolalaulani Hālau ʻŌlapa O Laka	Aloha Dalire* & Keola Dalire*	Heʻeia, Kāneʻohe, Oʻahu	—N/a			—N/a			—N/a			2M	1A					1M
Moana's Hula Hālau	Raquel Dudoit & Valerie Dudoit-Teaga	Kaunakakai, Molokaʻi	—N/a									—N/a						
Nā Hula O Kaohikukapulani	Kapu Kinimaka Alquiza		—N/a													—N/a		—N/a
Nā Lei O Kaholokū	Leialoha Lim Amina & Nani Lim Yap		—N/a															—N/a
Nā Mea Hula O Kahikinaokalālani	Karla Kealiʻihoʻomalu-Akiona		—N/a															
Nā Pua Me Kealoha	Sissy Kaio & Lilinoe McCormack	Carson, California	—N/a								—N/a			—N/a			—N/a	
Nā Pualei O Likolehua	Niuliʻi Heine	Kalihi, Oʻahu		—N/a							—N/a						—N/a	
Nani Ola Hawaiian Dance Company	Kanani Pharr-Cadaoas		—N/a															
Pua Aliʻi ʻIlima	Vicky Hanakaʻulaniokamāmalu Holt Takamine & Jeff Kānekaiwilani Takamine	Honolulu, Oʻahu		—N/a														
Pukalani Hula Hale	Hiʻilei Maxwell-Juan	Pukalani & Kahului, Maui	—N/a								—N/a							

Notes:

- * denotes Former Miss Aloha Hula Winner
- ** denotes a tie

=== Judges ===
Judge	Years	2026	2025	2024	2023	2022	2021	2019	2018	2017	2016	2015	2014	2013	2012	2011	2010	2009	2008
Ainsley Halemanu	5																		
Alicia Keawekane Smith	4																		
Cy Bridges	7																		
Ed Collier	3																		
Etua Lopes	6																		
Hōkūlani Holt Padilla	2																		
Holoua Stender	1																		
Iwalani Kalima	1																		
Joan S. Lindsey	5																		
Kalena Silva	8																		
Karl Veto Baker	1																		
Kawaikapuokalani Hewett	3																		
Kealiʻi Reichel	6																		
Kehaulani Kekua	1																		
Keith Awai	1																		
Kimo Alama Keaulana	1																		
Leiana Woodside	1																		
Leimomi Ho	1																		
Mae Kamāmalu Klein	6																		
Maelia Loebenstein Carter	6																		
Nālani Kanakaʻole Zane	13																		
Nani Lim Yap	5																		
Nathan Napoka	3																		
Noenoelani Zuttermeister Lewis	12																		
Pat Namaka Bacon	2																		
Piʻilani Lua	5																		
Pualani Kanakaʻole Kanahele	2																		
Rachel Lahela Kaʻaihue	3																		
Tracie Lopes	1																		
Vicky Hanakaʻulaniokamāmalu Holt Takamine	6																		
Wallis Punua	2																		
Wayne Chang	2																		
William Kahakuleilehua Haunuʻu "Sonny" Ching	3																		

== In popular culture ==
Jasmin Iolani Hakes' 2023 book Hula: A Novel, which won Honolulu magazine's award for Book of the Year About Hawaii, revolves around the Merrie Monarch competition.

== See also ==
- Molokai Ka Hula Piko
