= Ipu =

Percussion instrument made from gourds

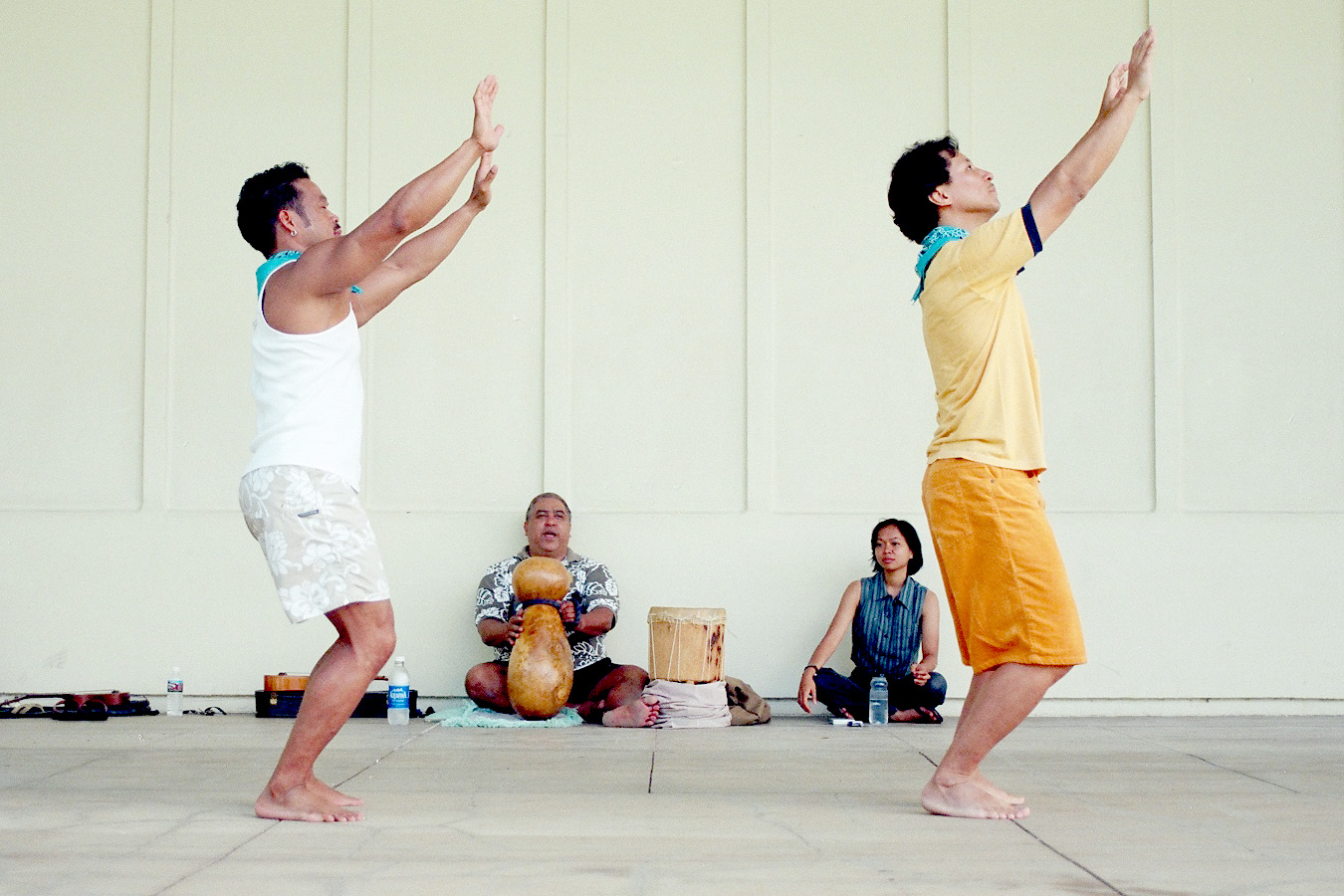
Kumu Kula Abiva played Ipu Heke while his dancers danced

Ipu /ˈiːpuː/ is a percussion instrument made from gourds that is often used to provide a beat for hula dancing.

There are two types of ipu, the ipu heke ([ˈipu ˈhɛke]), which is a double gourd made by taking two gourds of different sizes, cutting them and joining them at their necks with the smaller one on top, and the ipu heke ʻole ([ˈipu ˈhɛke ˈʔole]), which is made from a single gourd cut across the top. Both are made from gourds that have been dried, hollowed and usually polished smooth with sand or sandpaper.

== Ritual ==
The ipu gourd plays a large role in Hawaiian life. More than just an instrument the ipu was used for food, medicine, and a variety of other useful and artistic items. Because of the importance of ipu to basic life and culture, Hawaiians developed an entire ceremony around the planting of the gourd. In Hawaiian customs, the gourd plant should be planted on the night of Hua, during the lunar phase when it was believed to look the most like an egg or a fruit. The gourd should be planted done by a pot-bellied man who has just eaten a large meal. To stretch his stomach, the pot-bellied man must take the seeds and carry them as if they were already a fully grown and heavy gourd. The man would drop the seed into the hole he had dug for it, and then he would suddenly pull his hands apart with his palms facing upwards. The reason for this was that the Hawaiians believed that if his palms were to face downward, it would cause the gourd to twist and shrivel. After the seed was buried, the following chant would be recited:

He ipu nui!

O hiki ku mauna,

O hiki kua,

Nui maoli keia ipu!

Translation:

A huge ipu!

Growing like a mountain,

To be carried on the back,

Really huge is this gourd

== Growing process ==
Within two months, the first vine would begin to extend and small, minute buds would form at each leaf node. This first vine bears the male blossoms. Then, after the first vine develops, the stems which will bear the female blossoms also grows. The male flowers will begin blooming before the female flower in order to attract pollinating insects. After about a week, the female blossoms begin to open too. Each of the female blossoms has a tiny fruit at its base. This fruit can only develop if the female blossom is pollinated. In nature, this is usually done by a moth, since the flowers bloom at dusk, though many gourds are now pollinated by hand. The moth flies around the gourd patch and carries the pollen from the male flower to the female flower thus enabling the fruit to begin growing. The ipu takes 3–4 months to grow. During this time the gourds are very delicate.

== Decoration ==
The ipu gourds were more often left undecorated, although the koko (carrying nets) for the gourds were often highly ornamental. Some styles of carrying nets were even reserved only for royalty and the punishment for a commoner using these special ipu was death.

Though it was not typical, several other methods of decoration did exist:

- The Pawehe technique: which developed solely on the island of Niʻihau, where the gourds were dyed from the inside out. The skin was scraped from the shell so as to create a pattern. The gourd was then filled with dye of the desired color. After several weeks, the color had been drawn to the outside, in the areas where the skin was left on, through capillary action. The gourd was then emptied, cleaned, the (now moldy) skin scrubbed off with saltwater and sand, and allowed to dry. The scraped areas remained the natural color and the areas were the skin was left were now dyed, creating a striking contrast.
- The Laha technique: in which the gourd was ornately painted. Painted gourds are not documented in the earlier writings, but that does not exclude their existence. They certainly were in use at least by the time of Hawaiian historian, Samuel Kamakau, as he defines Laha as referring specifically to gourds decorated by painting.
- The Wela Paʻa technique: in which the dried gourd was decorated by wood burning. James A. King, a ship's captain turned Hawaiian politician explains: “They have a method of scoring them with a heated instrument, so as to give them the appearance of being painted, in a variety of neat and elegant designs...”

== In dance ==
"I le'a ka hula i ka ho'opa'a."

The hula is pleasing because of the drummer.

-Hawaiian Proverb

Chants and dances in ancient Hawaii were accompanied only by percussion instruments. This art was suppressed after the arrival of Christian missionaries in 1820, but revived under King David Kalākaua during his reign of 1874 to 1891.

The ipu and ipu heke are played by holding the Ipu at its neck and striking the bottom-right corner with the base of your right thumb, or tapping with your fingertips on the edges of the gourd. This is often accompanied by hula dance and or chant.
