= George Naʻope =

Hula master and Merrie Monarch Festival organizer

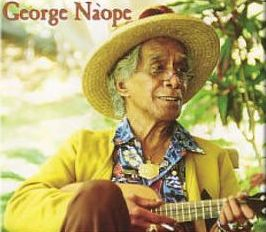
George Naʻope

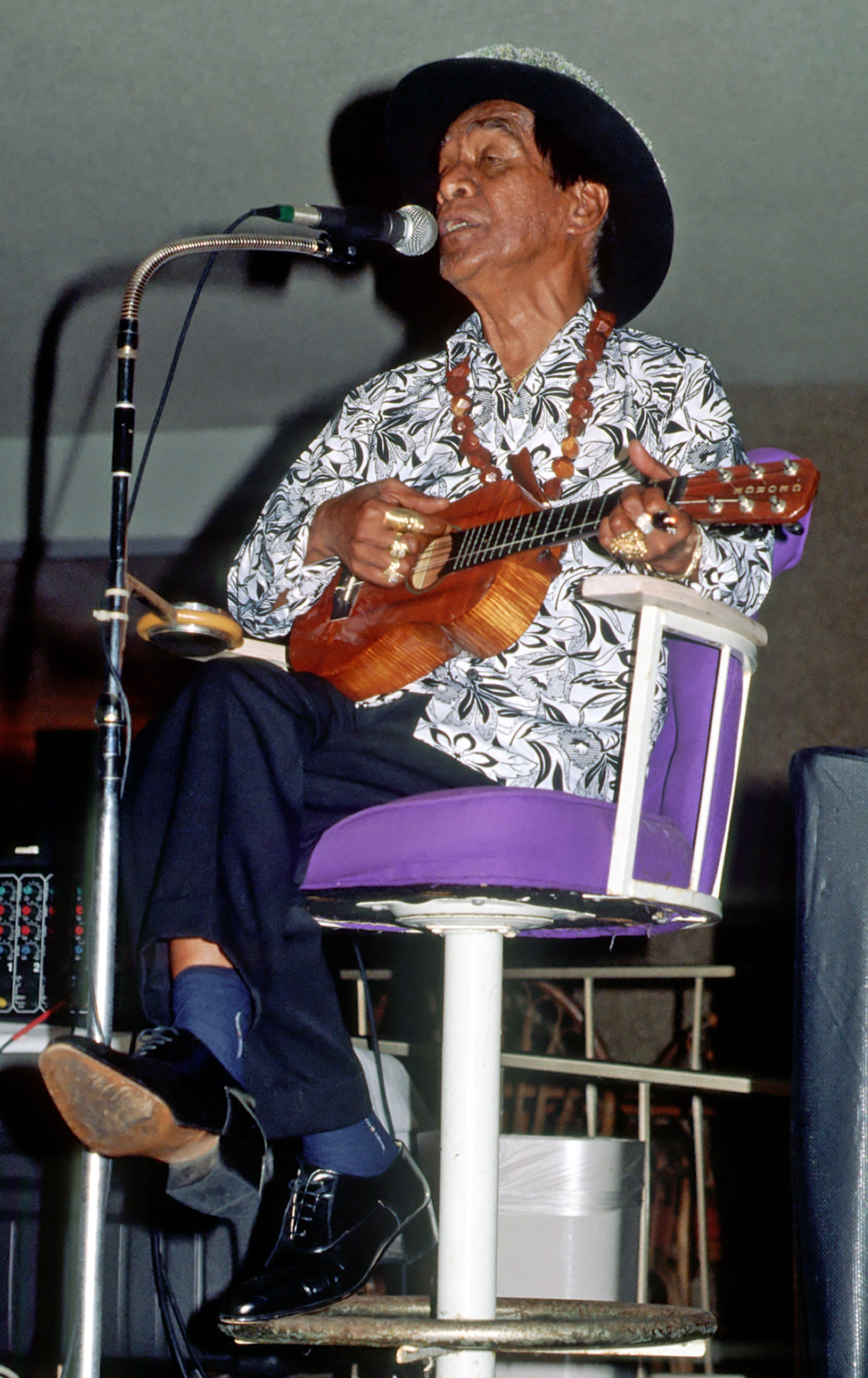
George Naʻope at the 'Keauhou Beach Hotel', Kailua-Kona (Hawaii)

George Lanakilakeikiahialiʻi Naʻope (February 25, 1928 – October 26, 2009), born in Kalihi, Hawaiʻi and raised in Hilo, was a celebrated kumu hula, master Hawaiian chanter, and leading advocate and preservationist of native Hawaiian culture worldwide. He taught hula dancing for over sixty years in Hawaiʻi, Japan, Guam, Australia, Germany, England, North America, and South America.

Naʻope was a scholar of ancient hula, which is hula developed and danced before 1893. He first studied hula at the age of three years under his great-grandmother, Mary Malia Pukaokalani Naʻope, who lived to be over 100 years old. At the age of four he began to study with Mary Kanaele, the mother and teacher of Edith Kanaka'ole. When he moved to Oʻahu at the age of ten, he studied for ten years with Joseph Ilalaʻole. After graduating from high school, Naʻope moved to Honolulu where he opened the George Naʻope Hula School, then later continued his studies under Kumu Hula Lokalia Montgomery and Tom Hiona.

Naʻope began to teach hula at the age of thirteen. His family was poor, so he taught hula for fifty cents per week in order to continue to pay for school. He taught chant and kahiko to the Ray Kinney dancers, and traveled with Ray Kinney.

In 1964, Naʻope founded the Merrie Monarch Festival, an annual week-long festival of traditional Hawaiian arts, crafts, and performances featuring a three-day hula competition. The festival became both a popular success and an important part of the Hawaiian Renaissance. In an interview Naʻope said of founding the festival, "I felt the hula was becoming too modern and that we have to preserve it. David Kalakaua [King of Hawaii, 1874–91; aka "The Merrie Monarch"] brought the hula back to Hawaii and made us realize how important it was for our people. There was nothing here in Hilo, so I decided to honor Kalakaua and have a festival with just hula. I didn't realize that it was going to turn out to be one of the biggest things in our state."

Naʻope was honored with numerous other awards, including being named a Living Treasure of Hawai'i by the Buddhist temple Honpa Hongwanji Mission of Hawai'i, "Treasure of Hawaiʻi" by President George W. Bush and the Smithsonian Institution, and receiving a National Heritage Fellowship by the National Endowment for the Arts in 2006, which is the United States' highest honor in the folk and traditional arts.

In 2007, Naʻope founded the Halau Hula Is Hawai'i Trust and Hula Is Hawai'i, LLC, and instructed his entire estate to be placed into his trust. Despite his Last Will and Testament, certain individuals went against his wishes.

Naʻope founded the Humu Moʻolelo, a quarterly journal of the hula arts.

== Death ==
Until his death from cancer on October 26, 2009, aged 81, he resided in Hilo, Hawaiʻi.

== See also ==
- Myrtle K. Hilo
