= Hawaiian Music Hall of Fame =

Coordinates: 21.2795°N 157.8308°W

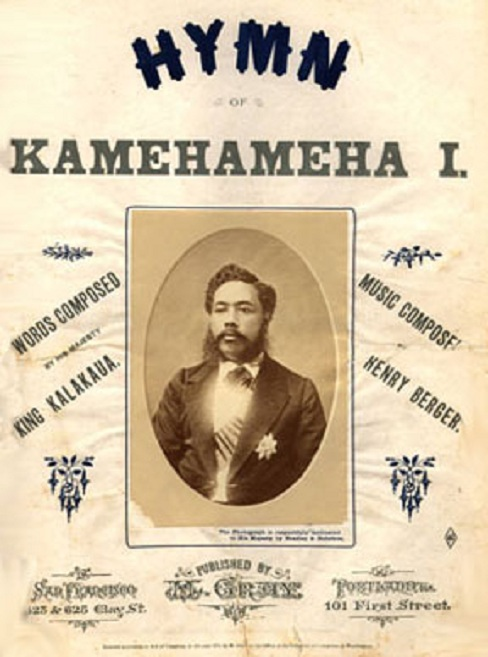
Hawaii Ponoi by Kalakaua and Henri Berger

The Hawaiian Music Hall of Fame is an organization dedicated to recognizing the cultural importance of the music of Hawaii and hula. Established in 1994, the Hawaiian Music Hall of Fame promotes the appreciation and preservation of Hawaiian culture through educational programs and annual inductions honoring significant individuals, groups, institutions, chanters and songs.

== The Royal Patrons ==
King David Kalakaua, Queen Liliuokalani, Princess Miriam Likelike and Prince William Pitt Leleiohoku II were siblings known as Na Lani ʻEhā, or The Royal Four, for their patronage and enrichment of Hawaii's musical culture and history. All four were composers. Their aggregate body of musical compositions in the Hawaiian language numbers in the hundreds. After the hula had long been banned by missionaries, Kalakaua restored it as a symbol of the Hawaiian culture. Kalakaua and Liliuokalani were the last monarchs of the Kingdom of Hawaii, but The Royal Four's legacy of music to Hawaii lives on through individual artists. The Hawaiian Music Hall of Fame acknowledges the royal siblings as their patrons.

Name	Image	Birth–Death	Notes	Ref(s)
Kalākaua		1836–1891	Lyricist for the state song "Hawaii Ponoi", honoring Kamehameha I (Henri Berger wrote the music). The last reigning king of the Hawaiian Kingdom. Helped restore the hula. The Merrie Monarch Festival is named in his honor.	
Liliʻuokalani		1838–1917	Last reigning monarch of Hawaiian Kingdom. Composed "Aloha 'Oe" and hundreds of other songs and chants List of compositions and works by Liliʻuokalani	
Likelike		1851–1887	Princess of the Hawaiian Kingdom, mother of Princess Ka'iulani. Composer and sponsor of musical events.	
Leleiohoku II		1854–1877	Prince and Heir Apparent of the Hawaiian Kingdom; List of compositions and works by Leleiohoku	

== Meles & Songbooks ==
Hawaiian Music Hall of Fame Songs
Song title	Year	Notes	Ref(s)
He Mele Aloha: A Hawaiian Songbook	2018	Published 2003; Editors: Vicky Hollinger, Kimo Hussey, Puakea Nogelmeier, Carol Wilcox	
The Queen's Songbook	2018	Published 1999; Editors: Dorothy Kahananui Gillett, Barbara Smith and Hui Hanai	
Hawaiʻi Ponoʻī	2012	State song of Hawaiʻi, written by King David Kalakaua and Henri Berger	
ʻĀlika	2002	Words & music by Charles Ka'apa	
Kalama'ula	2002	Words & music by Emma Kala Dudoit	
Wehiwehi 'Oe	2002	Words & music by Sylvester Kalama	
Hawaii Aloha	1998	Written by Rev. Lorenzo Lyons	
Kaulana Na Pua	1998	Written by Ellen Wright Prendergast	
Makalapua	1998	Written by Konia and Eliza Holt	
Na Ali'i	1998	Written by Samuel Kauhiwi	
Ua Like No A Like	1998	Written by Alice Everett	

== Institutions ==
Hawaiian Music Hall of Fame Institutions
Institution	Image	Year	Notes	Ref(s)
Kamaka Hawaii, Inc.		2013	Ukulele maker	
Kawaiahaʻo Church		2004	Church of Hawaiian royal family	
Kamehameha Schools		2003	Awarded for perpetuating Hawaiian music	

== Musical groups ==
Hawaiian Music Hall of Fame Groups
Name	Image	Year	Notes	Ref(s)
Hawaiian Room		2019	Musicians from the Lexington Hotel, New York City	
Beamer 'Ohana		2018	Nona, Keola, Kapono	
Ho‘opi‘i Brothers		2018	Richard Ho‘opi‘i (b.1941) and Solomon Ho‘opi‘i (1935–2006)	
Kahananui ‘Ohana		2018	Mother Dorothy Kahananui (c.1895–1984) and daughter Dorothy Gillett (1919–1996)	
The Isaacs Ohana		2017	Alvin Kaleolani Isaacs and his sons: Alvin Issacs Jr., Leland “Atta” Isaacs, Norman Isaacs,	
The Kanaka’ole Ohana		2017	Kekuhi Kanahele-Frias (mother), Pualani Kanaka'ole Kanahele (grandmother), Nalani Kanaka'ole (great aunt), Kaumakaiwa Kanaka'ole (daughter)	
Halekulani Girls		2015	Alice Fredlund, Sybil Bright Andrews, Linda Dela Cruz	
Hawaii Calls		2014	Radio show	
Ka Leo Hawai‘i		2012	Recording artists Alan Akaka, Daniel Akaka Jr., Haunani Apoliona, Haunani Bernardino, Malia Craver, Ainsley Halemanu, Larry Kimura, Lance Koyama, George Kuo, Aaron Mahi, Keoki Maguire, Lolena Nicholas, Mary Kawena Pukiu, Kalena Silva.	
Makaha Sons of Ni'ihau		2012	Recording artists	
Olomana		2011	Founded in 1973 by Jerry Santos and Robert Beaumont	
Richard Kauhi Quartet		2010	Formed by pianist Richard Kauhi in 1947	
Hui Ohana		2009	Formed by Ledward Kaʻapana with brother Nedward Kaʻapana, mother Tina Kaʻapana and cousin Dennis Pavao	
Leo Nahenahe Singers		2008	Formed in 1962 by Noelani Kanoho Mahoe. Other members included	
The Brothers Cazimero		2006	Duo formed in the 1970s	
Kahauanu Lake Trio		2005	See Kahauanu Lake	
Haili Church Choir		2001	Helped develop and promote Hawaiian music	
The Royal Hawaiian Band		1999	Established in 1836 by Kamehameha III and still active playing on the grounds of Iolani Palace	

== Chanters ==
Relevant historical events coinciding with the time frame of the chanter prophesies:

- 1778–1779, Captain James Cook and crew become the first Europeans to visit Hawaii.
- 1809 Henry Opukahaia of Hawaii arrives in New Haven, Connecticut and begins Christian studies.
- 1810 Kamehameha I succeeds in unification of the Kingdom of Hawaii.
- 1819 Kamehameha II assumes the throne upon the death of his father, breaks the kapu by eating at the table with the women, orders destruction of the heiau worship sites of the old religion.
- 1820 Hiram Bingham I arrives in Hawaii with the first wave of Christian missionaries.
- 1824–1849 Epidemics of measles, mumps and whooping cough kill tens of thousands of Hawaiians.

Hawaiian Music Hall of Fame Chanters
Name	Image	Birth–Death	Year	Notes	Ref(s)
James Pihanui Kuluwaimaka Palea		1837–1937	2011	Chanter in the court of Kalākaua, chanted for Queen Emma. After Kalakaua's death he retired to his home and married three times to professional hula women	
Akoni Mika		1858–?	2011	Kauai chanter recorded by ethnomusicologist Helen Heffron Roberts in the 1920s	
James Kaʻupena Wong		1929–2022	2008	Chanter, dancer, teacher, composer and recording artist. NEA National Heritage Fellowship in his honor. Protege of Mary Kawena Pukui.	
Ka'opulupulu		c. 1773	2000	Chanter and prophet who advised Kahahana against giving away Kualoa land on Oahu to Kahekili II of Maui. Kahekili II declared the priest a traitor and had both the priest and the priest's son killed. Prophesied the conquest of Hawaii by the white man, the end of the monarchy, and the extinction of the Hawaiian race.	
Kapoukahi			2000	Prophesied that Kamehameha I would be ruler over a united kingdom.	
Kapihe			2000	Offered prayers over newborn Kamehameha III, believed to be stillborn. Prophesied the end of the kapus (taboos). Other prophesies are believed to have foretold of the coming of the missionaries and subsequent downfall of the Hawaiian monarchy.	
Hewahewa		c. 1774–1837	2000	High priest under Kamehameha I and Kamehameha II, later converted to Christianity. Helped Ka'ahumanu and Keōpūolani end the kapus.	
Keaulumoku		1716–1784	1995 singularly 2000 with group	Chanter and prophet. His prophesies included Kamehameha I's unification of the islands, conquest by the white man, destruction of the temples, the downfall of the monarchy and extinction of the Hawaiian race.	

== Individuals ==
Hawaiian Music Hall of Fame Individuals
Name	Image	Birth–Death	Year	Notes	Ref(s)
Jules Ah See		1924–1960	2021-22	Steel guitar virtuoso	
Kihei de Silva		born 1949	2022		
Mapuana de Silva		born 1949	2022	Hula Kumu (teacher)	
Kawaikapuokalani Hewett			2022	Hula Kumu (teacher), songwriter	
David Kalama			2022		
Lorenzo Lyons		1807–1886	2022	Missionary, composer of "Hawaii Aloha"	
Mary Pula'a Robins			2022	Composer	
Pua Haʻaheo			2019		
Marta Hohu			2019		
David "Feet" Rogers		1935–1983	2019		
Harry B. Soria Jr.		1948–2021	2019		
Emily Kau'i Zuttermeister		1909–1994	2019		
Saichi Kawahara		1937–2019	2018		
Richard “Babe” Bell		born 1945	2017	Ceremonial conch shell blower	
Krash Kealoha		1949–2010	2017	Actor, radio personality, real name (Victor Hoonani Opiopio)	
Jacqueline "Skylark" Rossetti		1954–2019	2017	Radio personality	
Kimo Kahoano		born 1948	2017	Radio/TV personality	
Karen Keawehawai’i		born 1947	2017	Vocalist	
Melveen Leed		born 1943	2017	Actress, musical performer	
Israel Kamakawiwoʻole		1959–1997	2017	Musical performer	
Johnny Noble		1892–1944	2016	Musician, composer and arranger	
Jean “Kini” Sullivan		died 2008	2016	Recording industry producer & translation credits for Hawaiian songs.	
John Kaimikaua		1958–2006	2016	Hula instructor, Hawaiian culture expert, founder of the Moloka'i Ka Hula Piko festival	
Mamo Howell		1929–2020	2016	Dancer, model, fashion designer	
Danny Kaleikini		1937–2023	2016	Live entertainer and musician, actor	
Jerry Byrd		1920–2005	2015	Lap steel guitar	
Lei Collins		1913–1999	2015	Songwriter, Violet "Aunty Lei" Collins	
O'Brian Eselu		1955–2012	2015	Singer, kumu hula	
Lokalia Montgomery		1903–1978	2015	Authority on ancient Hawaiian culture, curator of Huliheʻe Palace; State of Hawaii's Order of Distinction for Cultural Leadership	
Darrell Lupenui		1952–1987	2015	Kumu hula	
Thaddius Wilson		c. 1952–2004	2015	Kumu hula	
Sonny Chillingworth		1932–1994	2014	Slack-key guitar, vocalist	
Lani Custino		1932–1998	2014	Hula dancer, vocalist, daughter of Vickie K. I'i Rodrigues	
Edith Kawelohea McKinzie		1925–2014	2014	Author, genealogy, hula and chant expert, professor of Hawaiian studies.	
Beverly Noa		1933–2017	2014	Miss Hawaii 1952, hula dancer	
Puakea Nogelmeier		born 1953	2014	Songwriter, Kumu Hula, and Associate Professor of Hawaiian Language at the University of Hawaii	
Don Ho		1930–2007	2013	Singer	
Matthew H. Kane		1872–1920	2013	Composer	
Iolani Luahine		1915–1978	2013	Kumu hula, dancer, chanter and teacher, who was considered the high priestess of the ancient hula	
Napua Stevens		1918–1990	2013	Hawaiian entertainer, singer, hula dancer, musician, teacher, radio-TV personality, producer and author	
Harry Owens		1902–1986	2012	Composer of "Sweet Leilani"	
George Kainapau		1905–1992	2012	Falsetto singer	
George Naʻope		1928–2009	2012	Kumu hula master	
Joseph Ilalaole		1873–1965	2011	Hula instructor, with ties to Queen Emma of Hawaii	
Benny Kalama		1916–1999	2011	Vocalist, musician, musical director of Hawaii Calls, arranger for Alfred Apaka	
Sam Li'a Kalainaina		1881–1975	2011	Big Island performer and promoter, composer known as "the poet of Waipio Valley"	
Alice Nāmakelua		1892–1987	2011	Kumu hula, lei maker, slack key guitar performer	
Pat Namaka Bacon		1920–2021	2010	Author and scholar of Hawaiian culture, adopted daughter of Mary Pukui	
Andy Cummings		1913–1995	2010	Composer who wrote "Waikiki"	
Ernest Kaʻai		1881–1961	2010	Ukulele virtuoso	
Keali'i Reichel		born 1961	2010	Vocalist, composer	
Thomas Sylvester Kalama		1856–1906	2009	Songwriter, published under the names Sylvester Kalama and Sylvester Thomas Kalama. Composer of "Maui Girl", "Wehiwehi Oe", "Kaleleonālani (Flight of the Royal Ones)", "One, Two, Three, Four", "Pua Mikinolia"	
Dennis Kamakahi		1953–2014	2009	Composer, vocalist, slack key guitarist	
Maʻiki Aiu Lake		1925–1984	2009	Hula master	
Kui Lee		1932–1966	2009	Composer, recording artist	
Joseph Ae'a		1846–1911	2008	Musician, composer, member of the Royal Hawaiian Band; agent of Her Majesty Liliuokalani	
Elizabeth Kahau Kauanui Alohikea		1885–1939	2008	Singer with the Royal Hawaiian Band, wife of Alfred Alohikea. She sang under the name "Lizzie Alohikea". She retired from the RHB on Aug. 31, 1937	
Anuhea Audrey Brown		1922–2011	2008	Musician composer, singer, pianist with the Haili Church Choir	
Thomas Kihei Desha Brown		1925–1978	2008	Falsetto singer, musician, band leader	
Alice Angeline Johnson		1912–1982	2008	Composer known as "The Song Bird of Maui"	
John Keola Lake		1937–2008	2008	Mentor and teacher of Hawaiian culture at Saint Louis High School, Chaminade University and Hawaiian Academy of Arts, Music, and Dance	
Albert Po'ai Nahalea Sr.		1910–1970	2008	Composer, Minister of Music, Haili Church Choir	
Palani Vaughan		1944–2016	2008	Recording artist	
Bill Ka'iwa		1934–2011	2007	Recording artist	
Jesse Kalima		1920–1980	2007	Ukulele virtuoso, vocalist	
Eddie Kamae		1927–2017	2007	Ukulele virtuoso	
Donald McDiarmid Sr		1898–1977	2007	Founder of Hula Records, composer, member of Harry Owens band.	
Peter Moon		1944–2018	2007	Vocalist and musician who began in the 1960s with Sunday Manoa	
Marlene Sai		born 1941	2007	Recording artist discovered by Don Ho	
John Pi'ilani Watkins		1928–1983	2007	Falsetto Hall of Fame member, hula master, a judge at the Merrie Monarch Festival	
Mahi Beamer		1929–2017	2006	Falsetto singer	
Charles K.L. Davis		1925–1991	2006	Opera singer who also sang hapa haole songs, sang as a duo in Los Angeles with James Shigeta	
Linda Dela Cruz		1929–2007	2006	Falsetto singer, activist for native Hawaiian rights	
Nina Keali`iwahamana		born 1936	2006	Vocalist	
Emma Veary		born 1930	2006	Vocalist with operatic range, performed in various venues in Waikiki. Noted for her rendition of Kamehameha Waltz	
Alfred Alohikea		1884–1936	2005	Kauai musician, composer; married to Lizzie Alohikea	
Bill Ali'iloa Lincoln		1913–1989	2005	Falsetto singer	
Henry W. Waia'u		1889–1949	2005	Composer	
Kahauanu Lake		1932–2011	2004	Composer, musician prominent in the Waikiki music scene	
Ray Kinney		1900–1972	2002	Vocalist who performed across multiple media. Discovered other performers such as Alfred Apaka and Eddie Kamae.	
Gabby Pahinui		1921–1980	2002	Vocalist, slack key guitarist, recording artist	
Genoa Keawe		1918–2008	2001	Falsetto singer, recorded in the Hawaiian language for 49th State Records	
Maddy Lam		1910–1985	2000	Composer, vocalist with Alfred Apaka and Webley Edwards	
John Kameaaloha Almeida		1897–1985	1998	Recording artist, composer of what have become standards of Hawaiian music	
Irmgard Farden Aluli		1911–2001	1998	Composer, wrote "Puamana"	
Robert Alex Anderson		1894–1995	1998	Composer of "Lovely Hula Hands", "Mele Kalikimaka" and many others	
Bina Mossman		1893–1990	1998	Composer, organized the first Hawaii girls glee club	
David Nape		1870–1913	1998	Composer, member of the Royal Hawaiian Band	
Albert "Sonny" Cunha		1879–1933	1996	Composer, the first one to popularize Hawaiian songs with English lyrics ("Hapa-Haole")	
Sol Hoʻopiʻi		1902–1953	1996	Steel guitar player	
Alvin Kaleolani Isaacs		1904–1984	1996	Original band leader of the Royal Hawaiians, composed over 300 songs	
Haunani Kahalewai		1929–1982	1996	Mezzo-soprano who was a featured vocalist with Alfred Apaka	
Mekia Kealakaʻi		1867–1944	1996	Bandmaster of the Royal Hawaiian Band	
Alfred Apaka		1919–1960	1995	Baritone singer who popularized romantic Hawaiian ballads during the 1950s.	
Helen Desha Beamer		1882–1952	1995	Composer and recording artist	
Henri Berger		1844–1929	1995	Led the Royal Hawaiian Band from 1872 until his death. Wrote the melody to Kalakaua's song Hawaii Ponoi.	
Sol K. Bright Sr.		1909–1992	1995	Recording artist and composer of "Hawaiian Cowboy", "Sophisticated Hula" and "Polynesian Love Song"	
Joseph Kekuku		1874–1932	1995	Inventor of the steel guitar	
Charles E. King	Charles E. King	1874–1950	1995	Composer	
Lena Machado		1903–1974	1995	Vocalist, composer, soloist with the Royal Hawaiian Band	
Mary Pukui		1895–1986	1995	Author of the Hawaiian Dictionary, chanter, composer	
Vickie I'i Rodrigues		1912–1987	1995	Vocalist who translated lyrics between the Hawaiian and English languages	

== See also ==
- Na Hoku Hanohano Awards
- Hawai'i Academy of Recording Arts
- Music of Hawaii
