= Danny Kaleikini =

American singer, recording artist, entertainer (1937–2023)

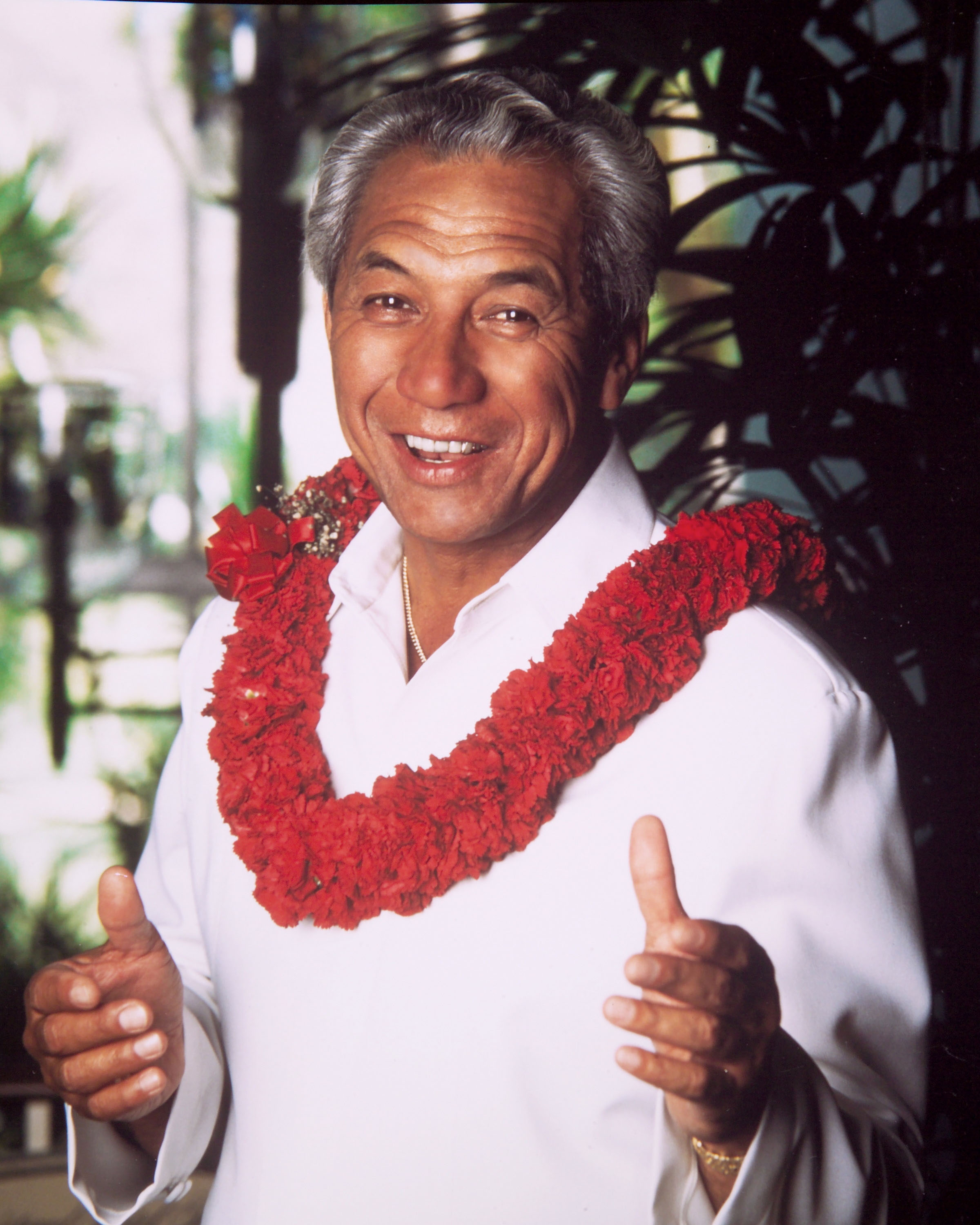
- Kaleikini in 2005

Background information
- Born: October 10, 1937; Honolulu, Territory of Hawaii, U.S.
- Died: January 6, 2023 (aged 85) Honolulu, Hawaii, U.S.
- Genres: Hawaiian; Hapa haole music; Traditional pop; Standards
- Occupations: Singer; entertainer; recording artist; entrepreneur; philanthropist

Danny "Kaniela" Kaleikini (October 10, 1937 – January 6, 2023) was an American singer, musical artist, and entertainer. Best known for his long-term residency at the Kahala Hilton in Hawaii, where he performed for 28 years, Kaleikini is often called "The Ambassador of Aloha". During his career of more than 50 years in show business, he was the opening act for Paul Anka at Caesars Palace in Las Vegas, and performed alongside Sammy Davis Jr., Wayne Newton, Dolly Parton, Phyllis McGuire, and Don Ho. A baritone who sang Hawaiian songs and played the nose flute, Kaleikini gained international recognition for promoting Hawaiian music, language, and culture.

== Early life and education ==
Kaleikini was born on October 10, 1937. He grew up in Papakolea in Honolulu, as one of nine children. He was of Native Hawaiian, Chinese, Korean, Irish, and Italian descent. His father, Danny Kaleikini Sr., was in the Hawaii National Guard, and worked for the City and County of Honolulu as a refuse worker. His mother Margie worked as a cocktail waitress at the Hilton Hawaiian Village. Kaleikini was bilingual in English and Hawaiian, and grew up learning to speak the Hawaiian language from his mother and grandfather.

At the age of five, he earned money by selling copies of The Honolulu Advertiser with his brother. On Fridays, after shining shoes in Chinatown, Kaleikini and his brother went to jam sessions with Jesse Kalima and Thousand Pounds of Melody, where they learned to sing and perform.

Kaleikini went to Royal Elementary School, where he played in the bell choir. As a student at Kawananakoa Intermediate, he played the trumpet and drums, and was elected student body president after running against Robert Kihune and others. Kaleikini attended Roosevelt High School, where he sang in the choir and performed in a 16-piece orchestra. His high school classmates included Ron Jacobs and Wesley Park, who later became his business manager. He attended the University of Hawaiʻi at Mānoa on a music scholarship, and majored in music education.

== Career ==
During his first year at University of Hawaiʻi, Kaleikini had a part-time job at the Waikiki Sands. At the Sands, he was discovered by bandleader Ray Kinney, who encouraged him to sing for tips while working as a busboy. Kinney became a mentor to Kaleikini, who also learned from entertainer Leinaala Ignacio. After six months, Kaleikini moved with Kinney to the Royal Hawaiian Hotel, where he was hired full-time by performer Haunani Kahalewai.

=== Hilton Hawaiian Village ===
Kaleikini's first major break was at the Hilton Hawaiian Village, where he performed for seven years. There, he was mentored by Hilo Hattie, who taught him to emcee in standard English rather than in Pidgin. He started working in the luau shows, and eventually became the headliner at the Tapa Room after the death of Alfred Apaka, performing together with hula dancer and singer Lani Custino. In July 1961, a review in the Honolulu Star-Bulletin called Kaleikini "a charming shaker" who "has the correct shakes as he shows his versatility in doing the Hawaiian and Tahitian hulas."

=== Residency at the Kahala Hilton ===
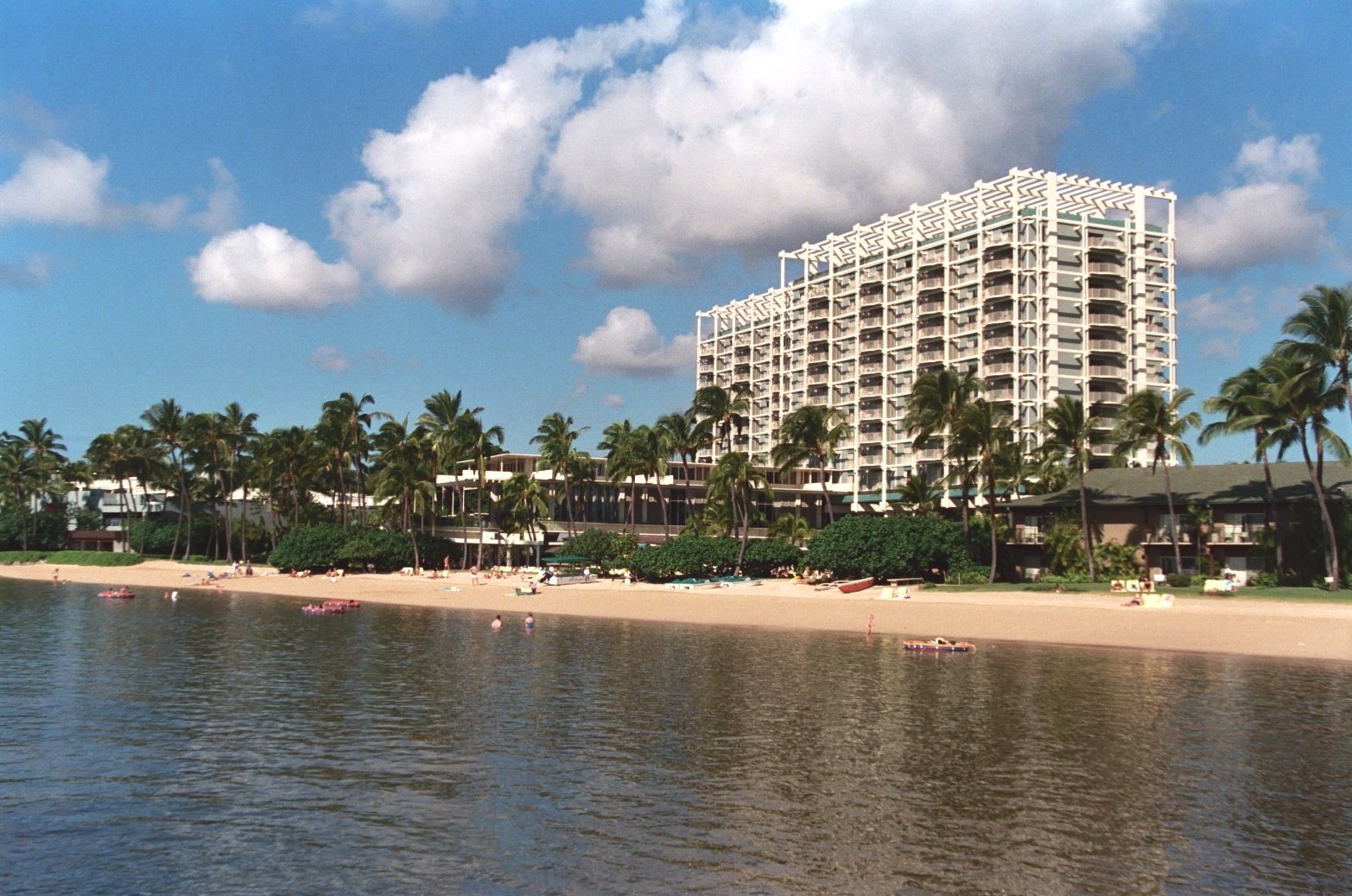
Kahala Hilton in 1988

In 1967, Kaleikini landed his show as the headline entertainer at the Hala Terrace at the Kahala Hilton, the first successful show outside Waikiki. His first five-year contract, negotiated by his manager Wesley Park, guaranteed income of $1.5 million. Over time, it became a "must-see" show attended by United States presidents, foreign dignitaries, and Hollywood celebrities. Kaleikini continued the residency at the Kahala Hilton for 28 years.

The show opened on April 26, 1967, and was twice nightly except for Tuesdays. In addition to Kaleikini, it featured a female vocalist, Penny Silva, three dancers, and five musicians led by Jimmy Kaopuiki. At first, Kahala was virtually unknown as a destination for tourists or for locals. Kaleikini was actively involved in promoting the show, taking a hula dancer and a ukulele player to Waikiki to perform songs during the day to build interest.

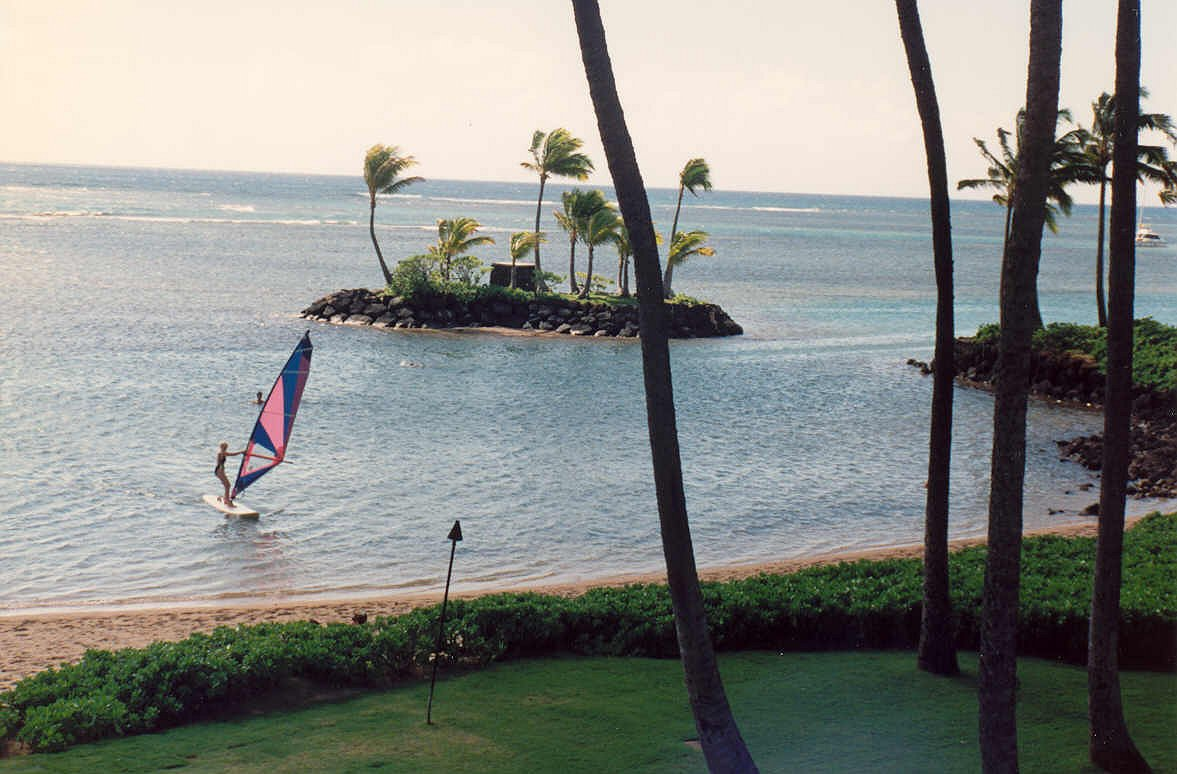
View from Kahala Hilton (1989)

A review in 1971 called it a "family show" with friendly and "clean" jokes that "would not make it in Waikiki". The show highlighted the cultures of both Hawaii and Tahiti. Kaleikini sang and danced with the moonlit Pacific Ocean as his backdrop, and mingled, and joked with the audience, calling on his friends to perform. A "comic linguist", Kaleikini typically opened the show with a multi-lingual greeting, and spoke Japanese to the Japanese tourists. He also played the rare Hawaiian nose flute, which took him five years to master. Billboard magazine reported that Kaleikini performed eight tunes during an hour set, including traditional Hawaiian and hapa haole "songs of Hawaii" written by pop artists, with hints of country music. The show's success was often attributed to Kaleikini's warmth and ability to charm the audience. By 1972, it was known as the "best-drawing Hawaiian show in the islands". Over the years, the show became more international in flavor, in response to more diverse audiences from around the world.

By 1974, he had the longest-running main room revue, having started his eighth year in the same locale. Over 10,000 performances later, on April 27, 1987, Kaleikini celebrated his 20th anniversary at the Hilton with a two-hour show. In 1988, Governor John Waihee officially declared Danny Kaleikini as "Hawaii's Ambassador of Aloha".

Kaleikini retired from the Kahala Hilton on December 31, 1994, when the hotel was sold. His long run at the Hala Terrace of the Kahala Hilton earned him a nomination in the Guinness Book of World Records. In 2022, the Kahala Hotel & Resort honored him by renaming its front drive to Danny Kaleikini Square.

=== Performances in Japan ===
Over the course of his career, Kaleikini became a frequent visitor to Japan and learned to speak Japanese. In 1970, he was asked by Governor John A. Burns to attend Expo '70, the world's fair held in Osaka, Japan, to check out the Hawaii Pavilion and coach the performers. His visit to the Expo, accompanied by the popular Hawaiian sumo wrestler Jesse "Takamiyama" Kuhaulua, helped to raise his profile and led to subsequent engagements in Japan.

In April 1973, Kaleikini was invited to the second annual Tokyo Music Festival to compete with singers from around the world, including Olivia Newton-John. Kaleikini sang "My Goddess of Love" by Charles "Bud" Dant and won the TBS Award.

On July 26, 1986, Kaleikini became the first "foreigner" (gaijin) to perform at the Hiroshima Peace Music Festival, after being invited by Hiroshima Mayor Takeshi Araki, who had seen him perform at the Kahala Hilton three years prior. Kaleikini sang "The Snows of Mauna Kea" by Jay Larrin, Japanese classic "Koko ni sachi ari", and Frank Sinatra's "My Way", in a program that was broadcast nationwide in Japan on August 3, 1986, by Nippon Television Network.

=== Shows in the mainland United States ===
On June 21, 1973, Kaleikini had his Las Vegas debut at the 1,000-seat Caesars Palace showroom, opening for Paul Anka during a two-week engagement. His first show was attended by an estimated 400 people from Hawaii, and broadcast by one-hour satellite delay on KHON-TV in Honolulu. The following year, he was invited back to Caesars Palace for a one-week engagement as the co-headliner with Phyllis McGuire, one of the McGuire Sisters. In December 1988, Harrah's Reno in Nevada featured "Danny Kaleikini's Hawaiian Christmas", a one-week engagement at the Headliner Room.

== Radio, television, and film ==
=== Radio ===
In the 1960s, Kaleikini had a radio show on KHVH on Saturday afternoons from 1 pm to 5 pm. In the 1970s, he became a regular on Webley Edwards's Hawaii Calls radio show, a showcase for professional musicians, once considered the most widely known Hawaiian music radio program worldwide. After Edwards had a heart attack in 1972, the show was taken over by new management, and Kaleikini was hired by Bud Dant as the permanent host. Kaleikini became a 20-percent owner of the show, which struggled to obtain sponsorship in its final years, and Hawaii Calls aired for the last time on August 16, 1975.

=== Television ===
Kaleikini appeared in a few episodes of the original Hawaii Five-O television series, as well as The Merv Griffin Show, The Today Show, and Dolly (with host Dolly Parton).

In 1970, he became the host of Danny Kaleikini Theater on KHON-TV, which aired on Saturdays at 11 pm and Sundays at 2:30 pm. Each week, he presented a feature film, with three pre-recorded segments where Kaleikini showed unique spots in Hawaii.

=== Film ===
Kaleikini was in two motion pictures, including The Hawaiians, a 1970 film based on the novel Hawaii by James Michener. In The Hawaiians, Kaleikini played the captain of the Royal Hawaiian Guard, who arrested the lead character played by Charlton Heston.

== Business ==
In the 1960s, the Kaleikinis had two bikini shops in Waikiki—one on Seaside Avenue and the other inside the Hilton Hawaiian Village. The shops featured Polynesian wear for men and women under the "Danny Kaleikini" label, and were operated by his wife, Jacqueline, who was originally from Tahiti. They eventually expanded to five shops.

An avid golfer, Kaleikini, won the inaugural Tahiti Open in 1982. He was the official greeter of the Hawaiian Open Golf Tournament for many years starting in 1972. He also hosted his own annual Danny Kaleikini golf tournament in Hawaii and in Japan. He served on the board of directors for companies including Aloha Petroleum and Servco Pacific and Financial, and numerous nonprofit organizations, such as the Hawaii Visitors Bureau, the Honolulu Boy Choir, Hui Waʻa Surfing Association, Kamehameha Schools, and Waialae Country Club.

== Philanthropy and community service ==
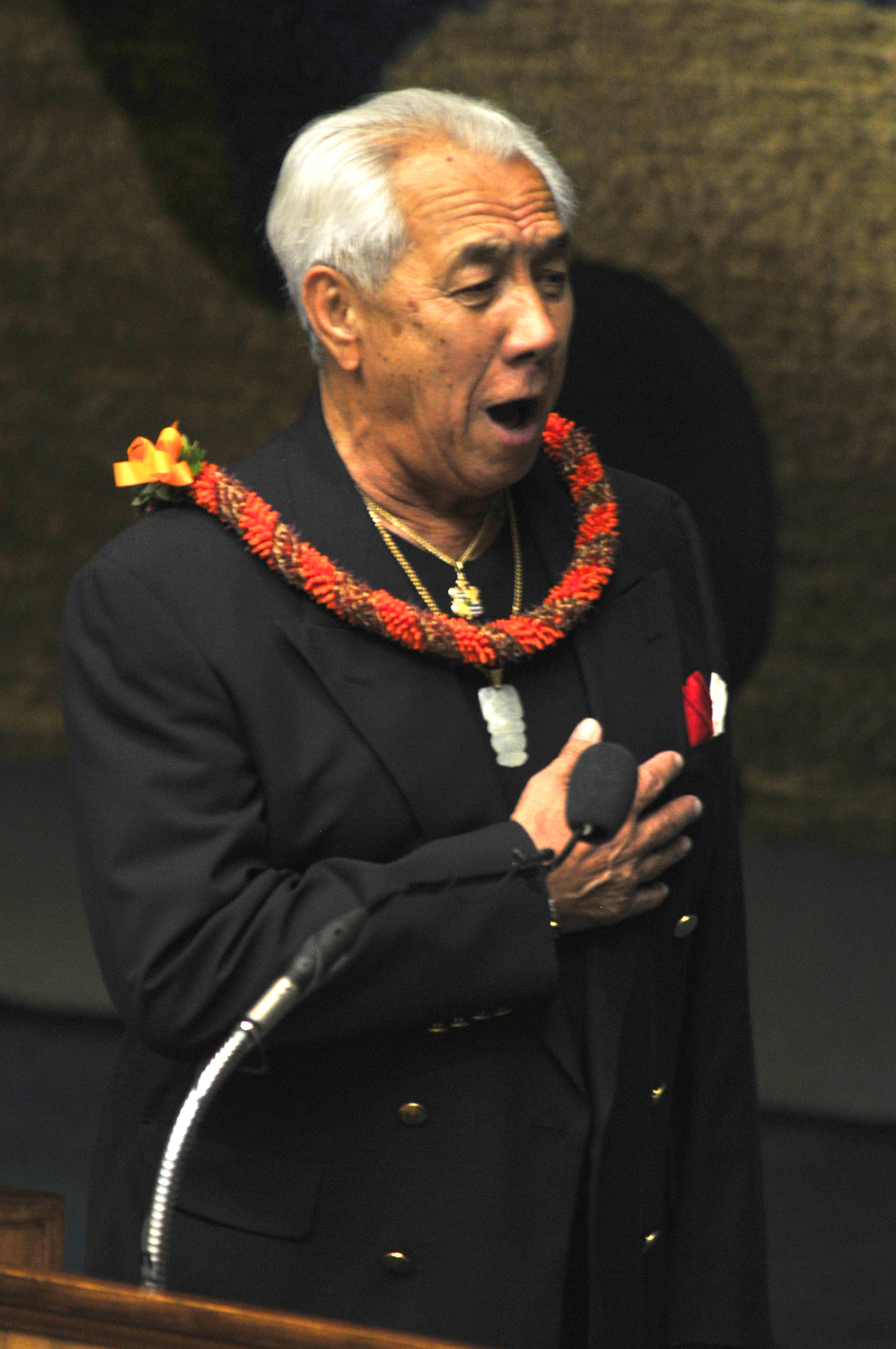
Kaleikini singing the national anthem and "Hawaiʻi Ponoʻī" in 2013

In 1972, Kaleikini made his debut as emcee of the Annual Ukulele Festival of Hawaii, which he continued to host every year together with festival founder Roy Sakuma, as it grew into an international event at the Kapiolani Park Bandstand. In 2018, he was both emcee and guest of honor at the 48th Annual Ukulele Festival, and performed in the final virtual event in 2022.

In 1983, he established the non-profit Danny Kaleikini Foundation, and served as president. The foundation gave over $400,000 in donations, helping local organizations provide services to the community. He also endowed the Danny Kaleikini scholarship at the University of Hawaii.

Kaleikini was closely involved in the restoration and preservation of Kahaluʻu Fish Pond over a two-year period starting in 1995, working with his business partner Linda Wong and four other volunteers. To raise funds for the project, they built the Aloha Ke Akua Chapel, operated by Watabe Wedding Corp.

Over the years, he gave his time to more than 100 community organizations.

== Politics ==
In 1994, former Honolulu mayor Frank Fasi chose Kaleikini as his running mate when he ran for governor. Fasi formed a short-lived independent party called the Best Party, after a political career during which he had run and served as both a Democrat and a Republican mayor in Hawaii. In their campaign, Fasi and Kaleikini promised to "give government back to the people" and cut income taxes.

Kaleikini was considered a popular but unconventional choice for lieutenant governor. He had long-standing connections to "politicos" in Honolulu, where he was known as a "straight shooter". During the 1994 campaign, he was praised for helping to "smooth" Fasi's "notorious bluntness", but critics worried about Kaleikini's lack of political experience and his readiness to assume the office of governor in the event of an emergency. Based on the candidates' financial disclosure forms, Kaleikini was found to be the wealthiest among the six candidates running for governor and lieutenant governor.

After spending close to $4 million on the gubernatorial campaign, Fasi and Kaleikini finished second in the election, with 31 percent of the vote. They finished ahead of Republican candidates Pat Saiki and Fred Hemmings, but were 6 percentage points behind Democrats Ben Cayetano and Mazie Hirono.

== Recordings ==
Kaleikini had his own recording company, DK Records. In 1993, producer Michael Cord released Danny Kaleikini: Hawaii's Ambassador of Aloha, a double-length disc of 24 songs recorded by Kaleikini in the 1970s.

In 2006, Mahalo Records re-issued Luau at the Hilton Hawaiian Village, which featured a 1962 recording of Kaleikini headlining a "live" show prior to his tenure at the Kahala Hilton. Wayne Harada wrote in The Honolulu Advertiser that the album, "complete with conch shell blowing and description of the pig-in-the-imu procession, is a reflection of another era, and, for Kaleikini die-hards, a glimpse of a star in the making."

In 2015, Danny Kaleikini and his grandson Nicholas Kaleikini recorded and released Aloooha, an album of five songs including Hawaiian and pop standards with American jazz and pop arrangements. The EP was well-received by critics, with John Berger of Honolulu Star-Advertiser saying that "Danny's voice is as strong and operatic as ever."

In 2017, the Kaleikinis recorded and released Mahaaalo, which introduced three original songs, including "Aloha" which was written by Danny and sung in Hawaiian, and "Kuʻuipo", a love song which Danny and Nicholas wrote together. It was a first for Danny Kaleikini, who like Frank Sinatra and Alfred Apaka, was best known for his covers rather than as a songwriter.

== Personal life and death ==
Kaleikini married Jacqueline Wong of Tahiti, with whom he had two children: a daughter, Leonn Keikilani, and a son named Danjacques. Both children performed with their father from the age of two. On Thanksgiving Day 1992, Danjacques Kaleikini died of complications from pneumonia at age 29.

Kaleikini died at St. Francis Hospice in Nuʻuanu on January 6, 2023, at age 85. A memorial service for Kaleikini was held at Kawaiahaʻo Church on February 18, 2023.

== Awards and honors ==
Danny Kaleikini received numerous awards and honors during his lifetime, including:

- Honoree, Hawaiian Music Hall of Fame, 2016
- Honorary doctorate from the University of Hawaiʻi, 1991
- Proclaimed "Hawaii's Ambassador of Aloha" by Governor John Waihee, 1988
- Honoree, Salvation Army Partners in Community Service, 2013

== Documentary film ==
A documentary, Kaniela: The Danny Kaleikini Story, had its world premiere on October 10, 2024, at the Hawaii International Film Festival (HIFF).

The executive producer, Mike Lum, who co-directed the film with filmmaker Pawel Nuckowski, first met Kaleikini in early 2020 when he agreed to appear in a television commercial for Lum's Medicare insurance business which aired while most Hawaii residents were staying home due to the global COVID-19 pandemic. After getting to know him and collaborating on various other projects, Lum approached Kaleikini with the idea for a documentary, and began filming in October 2021.

In addition to interviews with Kaleikini, his friends, and family, Kaniela incorporates old film footage, including the earliest footage of Kaleikini performing at the Kahala Hilton, provided to the producers by his daughter Keikilani. According to Keikilani Kaleikini, the film is "a real documentary, not a tribute", with emotional, funny, and sad moments that provide a glimpse into the realities of his life and his legacy of aloha.
