= Haunani Kahalewai =

Hawaiian singer

- Born: February 19, 1929; Hilo
- Died: March 2, 1982; San Carlos
- Awards: Hawaiian Music Hall of Fame (1996)

Haunani Kahalewai (February 19, 1929 – March 2, 1982) was a singer and entertainer known as the "First Lady of Song in Hawai‘i". Her distinctive contralto voice spanned three octaves. She was featured on dozens of recordings and headlined the Polynesian Revue at the Royal Hawaiian Hotel in Waikiki. Kahalewai was inducted into the Hawaiian Music Hall of Fame in 1996.

== Early life and education ==
Myrna Kahaunaniomaunakeakauiokalewa Kahalewai was born in Hilo on February 19, 1929. The day she was born an unusual snowfall blanketed Mauna Kea; her given middle name is translated as "beautiful snow on the slopes of Mauna Kea".

Her voice was first recognized at age three, when she won a silver dollar in a radio contest hosted by Ray Kinney. She performed in her high school chorus and graduated from Kaimukī High School in 1947

== Career ==
Kahalewai was well known for her sultry voice, her three octave range, and her stately manner. She performed on dozens of commercial records and recorded with Decca Records and Capitol Records Her biography at the Hawaiian Music Hall of Fame describes her as "the most widely-recognized and revered female singing voice in Hawai‘i during her memorable professional career.

She began her professional career in a small club outside Honolulu. Kahalewai performed with musical group the Rainbow Serenaders in the 1950s in small clubs on Oahu. They won a talent contest to perform at the Royal Hawaiian Hotel for a two-week engagement, which became a three-month gig due to their popularity. Later, a producer filming in Hawai‘i recorded her voice on a film soundtrack; after hearing her on the film soundtrack, producer Webley Edwards exclaimed, "Find that voice!" Performer Al Kealoha Perry convinced Kahalewai to stop performing at a small resort on Kauaʻi in order to perform on Edwards's weekly radio program Hawaii Calls. She became one of the featured singers on Hawaii Calls.

Kahalewai was the star of the Royal Hawaiian Hotel's Polynesian Revue. She hired many well-regarded Hawaiian performers to perform with her at the Royal Hawaiian's Monarch Room, including singers Danny Kaleikini, Nina Keali'iwahamana, and Boyce Rodrigues, and hula dancers Beverly Noa and Lani Custino. She performed with Donn Beach in his Sunday luau shows at Don the Beachcomber. Alfred Apaka requested Kahalewai as the featured female vocalist with him in Waikiki. She toured the world with a full show of dancers, musicians, and singers. She also reportedly broke box office records when she performed at the Fairmont Royal York in Toronto.

== Later life and legacy ==
After leaving Hawai‘i for the San Francisco area, Kahalewai considered herself semi-retired, but performed for special occasions. She went back to school and prepared for a new career in computers, but before she could do so, she died at her home in San Carlos, California, on March 2, 1982.

Kahalewai was acknowledged by Hawaiian entertainers as "Hawai‘i's First Lady of Song". She was inducted into the Hawaiian Music Hall of Fame in 1996, its second year of existence.
