= Vickie Iʻi Rodrigues =

Hawaiian composer and entertainer

- Born: November 14, 1912; Honolulu
- Died: July 22, 1987
- Education: President William McKinley High School
- Occupations: Composer, musician, translator
- Children: Lani Custino, Nina Keali’iwahamana
- Awards: Hawaiian Music Hall of Fame (1995)

Victoria Keali‘ika‘apunihonua I‘i Rodrigues (November 14, 1912 – July 22, 1987) was a Hawaiian musician and entertainer. Born into a Native Hawaiian family with strong musical roots, Rodrigues preserved and shared traditional Hawaiian songs that might otherwise have been lost, including "Hawai‘i Aloha," "Kaulana Nā Pua," and "Paoakalani". She was honored by multiple organizations for her contributions to Hawaiian culture, including being inducted into the Hawaiian Music Hall of Fame in 1995.

== Early life and education ==
Victoria Keali‘ika‘apunihonua I‘i was born in Honolulu on November 14, 1912. Her parents were James Keaoulilani Ii and Agnes Luika Sylvester; she was a hānai child raised by her paternal grandparents, James Kaihiihikapuokalani and Katherine Lahilahi Stevens Ii. Her family was full of musicians and storytellers dedicated to preserving and sharing Native Hawaiian culture. Vickie began singing at age 3, learning classic Hawaiian Mele (songs and chants). She first performed at the Bijou Theatre in Honolulu at age five.

She attended Sacred Hearts Convent and Washington Intermediate School in Honolulu. The sisters at Sacred Hearts Convent would ask her to perform and provided piano and vocal lessons. While attending McKinley High School, Vickie was the assistant producer for the school's Hawaiian pageants, gaining experience in producing, directing, and choreographing.

In 1931 she married Clarence L. Rodrigues; their five children all became entertainers: Lorraine Keaoululani "Lani" Custino, Rachel Kaneikolia "Mackie" Rodrigues, Lawrence Kaihiihikapuokalani "Boyce" Rodrigues, Katherine "Nina" Keali‘iwahamana Rapozo, and John James Ioane Rodrigues.

== Career as an entertainer ==
Rodrigues was a part of the popular radio show Hawaii Calls from its first show in 1935 until 1951, when her daughter Lani replaced her.

She was a member of multiple choirs and glee clubs, including the Honolulu Girls Glee Club and the Royal Hawaiian Girls Glee Club. She performed at many locations around Oahu, including with groups such as Al Kealoha Perry and his Singing Surfriders, the Honolulu Girls, the Lei Lehua Trio, and Pauline Kekahuna's Hauoli Troupe. Rodrigues produced many shows, including working closely with the Aloha Week committee on many of their early pageants. She was also a hula practitioner and kumu (teacher).

In 1951, Rodrigues wrote down the music and words of songs she had learned from her family, preserving songs that may otherwise have been lost. Some of the songs that she reintroduced included "Hawai‘i Aloha", "Kanai‘aupuni", "Kaulana Nā Pua" and "Paoakalani". She was also highly sought after for her translation skills, from Hawaiian to English and from English to Hawaiian, translating everything from Christmas carols to the popular songs of the day.

She recorded two albums singing with her children, published through Hula Records: Na Mele Ohana in 1962 and Na Mele Punahele in 1968. The latter album used her honorific form of name on its cover: "Auntie Vickie Sings".

== Death and honors ==
Rodrigues died in her home on July 22, 1987.

The Honolulu chapter of the National Society of Arts and Letters honored her contributions to Hawaiian culture in 1979. A 1980 Hawaii House of Representatives resolution honored Rodrigues. In 1986 she was awarded the Sidney Grayson Hoku Award, a lifetime achievement honor provided by the Na Hoku Hanohano Awards. Rodrigues was an honoree of the Hawaiian Music Hall of Fame in 1995 as part of its inaugural group of inductions.

The 99th annual Kamehameha Schools Song Contest, held in 2019, was given the theme "Nā Mele ‘Ohana: The Musical Legacy of Vickie Ii Rodrigues," celebrating the stories, songs, and dances shared by Vickie and the Rodrigues family.
