= Bina Mossman =

American politician

Bina Mossman, 1954

Bina Kailipaina Nieper Mossman (January 7, 1893 – May 20, 1990) was an American ukulele player, vocalist, composer, and Republican Party office holder. She also served as High Sheriff of Honolulu. She was tutored in music, and pronunciation of Hawaiian words, by deposed Queen Liliuokalani.

== Early life and family ==
She was born Bina Nieper in Honolulu to John Theodore Nieper and his wife Susan Kaiokulani Titcomb. Her father's family immigrated to Hawaii from Germany as sugar plantation laborers. She married stevedore Richard Norman Mossman in 1912. Their marriage produced daughters Ynez and Mapuana, as well as sons Richard Jr. and Sterling. The latter was a detective with the Honolulu Police Department by day, and followed in Bina's footsteps at night. For two decades, Sterling Mossman and his Barefoot Bar Gang entertained audiences in Waikiki.

== Political career ==
After the Nineteenth Amendment to the United States Constitution gave women the right to vote, Bina began working behind the scenes in Hawaii's Republican Party. With her first political convention, she involved herself in committee work, and was elected to handle music entertainment for meetings. By 1935, she was working in administrative positions with the territorial legislature. Bina served as the first woman legislator from Hawaii's 5th district of Oahu for three terms, beginning in 1938. That same year, she was elected National Committeewoman of the Republican Party. In 1945, Bina was elected to the House of Representatives, from the 5th District of Hawaii for 1939 – 1943, and re-elected from the same district in 1945. She was appointed High Sheriff of Honolulu for the term 1953–1957.

== Music career ==
Bina Mossman's Glee Club (1914–1917) was the first all-female glee club in Hawai. They rehearsed under the supervision of deposed Queen Liliuokalani at Washington Place. According to her 1971 account for the Watamull Foundation Oral History Project, during the Queen's lying in state and funeral, the glee club was chosen to be part of the kahili bearers who stood watch over her body for two hours at a time, waving the kahilis and singing Liliuokalani's compositions.

In the 1950s Bina formed the Kaahumanu Choral Group, an all-female ensemble of mothers, grandmothers and great grandmothers. They were billed as being direct descendants of Hawaiian royalty.

In 1950, Bina wrote "Nâ Kipikoa" (Stevedore Hula) as a tribute to Hawaii's dockworkers. It was recorded by Genoa Keawe and her Hawaiians.

== Later life and death ==
Bina Mossman died in 1990. She was posthumously elected in 1998 to the Hawaiian Music Hall of Fame.

== Discography ==
Bina Mossman's Glee Club discography
Year	Title	Composer/Lyricist/Arranger	Label Matrix	Notes	Ref(s)
1928	"Kuu lei mokihana"	Charles E. King	Columbia 146679		
1928	"He ono" (Delicious)	Bina Mossman	Columbia 146679	with the Honolulu Serenaders	
1928	"Niu haohao" (Young Coconut)	Bina Mossman	Columbia 146700	with the Honolulu Serenaders	
1928	"Lei i ka mokihana"	Henry W. Waiau	Columbia 146703		
1928	"That's what the lei said to me"	Alfred Perez	Columbia 146727	with the Honolulu Serenaders	
1935	"Paauau"	Charles E. King	Victor BVE-89039	Alice Johnson, soprano soloist	
1935	"Hoonanea"	Lena Machado	Victor BVE-89040		
1935	"Ka ulua"	Charles E. King	Victor BVE-89048		
1935	"Lei ilima"	Charles E. King	Victor BVE-89049		
1935	"Kalakaua"	Johnny Noble	Victor BVE-89051	Chant	
1935	"Kaleponi'	Bina Mossman	Victor BVE-89052		
1935	"Mi nei"	Charles E. King	Victor BVE-89053		
1935	"Hooheno na pua"	Bina Mossman, Hana Pring	Victor BVE-89074		
1935	"Manoa"	Bina Mossman	Victor BVE-89075		
1935	"Ula noweo"	Ralph Young	Victor BVE-89077		
1935	"Anapau"	Ralph Young	Victor BVE-89078		
1935	"Papalina lahilahi"	Bina Mossman	Victor BVE-89080		
