= Charles K.L. Davis =

Native Hawaiian opera singer and musician

- Ray Kinney Presents Charles K.L. Davis at The Royal Hawaiian (1958)

Background information
- Born: Charles Keonaonalaulani Llewellyn Davis; September 17, 1925; Honolulu, Oahu, Territory of Hawaii
- Died: October 31, 1991 (aged 66) Honolulu, Oahu, Hawaii
- Occupation: Operatic tenor/baritone
- Instruments: Piano, cello, pipe organ
- Years active: 1940–1991
- Labels: Bishop Corporation; Colpix; Columbia Masterworks; Decca; Hana Hou; Everest; Hula; Lehua; Royal; Sunset; World Record Club
- Formerly of: James Shigeta (as Guy Brion)

Charles Keonaonalaulani Llewellyn Davis (September 17, 1925 – October 31, 1991) was a Native Hawaiian opera singer and musician. He was a child prodigy, raised on a sugar cane plantation, and a direct descendant of John Papa ʻĪʻī, personal attendant to Lunalilo. Trained as an opera singer, he vocalized in both tenor and baritone ranges. He and actor James Shigeta briefly toured as a nightclub act. Versatile with a variety of vocal forms, and a multi-linguist, he sang the music of Cole Porter at the Hollywood Bowl, and presented a concert in honor of Kamehameha Day at Carnegie Hall. Davis performed with the Opera Company of Boston during a White House engagement, and was a nightclub performer in Hawaii. He received the Lifetime Achievement Award from the Hawai'i Academy of Recording Arts, and was inducted into the Hawaiian Music Hall of Fame.

== Background ==
Davis was born in 1925 in Honolulu, Territory of Hawaii, of mixed heritage that included Native Hawaiian. His father, Arthur Lewis Davis, was the resident physician on Waialua Sugar Plantation, where he and his brother Francis were raised. His mother, Rose Kaouinuiokalani Davis, was the daughter of Irene ʻĪʻī, whose father John Papa ʻĪʻī was a personal attendant and political advisor to Hawaiian royalty. Territorial legislator Francis Hyde I'i Brown was his uncle.

His mother tutored him in the Hawaiian language. Music was ever-present in their home. Rose Davis was known for hosting expansive luaus that drew hundreds of guests, among whom were that era's popular Hawaiian entertainers. He would later reminisce about his youth when his father's patients would pay visits during the Christmas season and fill their home with singing. He attributed much of his later repertoire to a songbook once owned by Queen Liliʻuokalani's musical protégée Rose Tribe. Robert Cazimero described Davis' personal character as, "Charlie's from that time when people were kinder, gentler – who believed in the aloha spirit and shared everything with everyone."

Davis was a child prodigy, playing the piano at age 2, and later learning the cello and pipe organ. After serving in the Seventh Air Force during World War II, Davis enrolled in the University of Hawaii as a music major, becoming a member of the Gleemen of Honolulu under the university's music director Norman Rian. Initially developing his talent as a baritone, he was selected to receive vocal training during the summer of 1948 at the Music Academy of the West in Montecito, California, under the mentorship of veteran operatic baritone Richard Bonelli. Before leaving for California, he made a June 7 appearance on radio station KGMB's 15-minute weekly show The Musical Voice of Young Hawaii. Following completion of his training in California, Davis enrolled at the Juilliard School in New York.

== Career success ==
Davis was a 1951 winner of Arthur Godfrey's Talent Scouts. That year, he and James Shigeta teamed as a nightclub act under the names of Charles Durand (Davis) and Guy Brion (Shigeta), appearing at the Mocambo in Los Angeles, the Flamingo Las Vegas and the Palmer House Hilton in Chicago. Although successful, the act was short-lived due to Shigeta's enlisting in the United States Marine Corps. Davis switched his vocal range to tenor, and in 1953 made his debut performance at the Hollywood Bowl, as part of an evening of the music of Cole Porter.

In between tours, Davis resumed voice training in New York. In 1958, he became one of the finalists in the Metropolitan Opera Auditions of the Air. As a result, the Met's General Manager Rudolf Bing offered him a tour of Europe, but a prior commitment at the Royal Hawaiian Hotel in Waikiki precluded his acceptance, and Bing's offer was dropped. The Waikiki engagement resulted in his first record album, Ray Kinney Presents Charles K. L. Davis At The Royal Hawaiian. The following year, Davis joined television host Ed Sullivan's ensemble for two weeks at Gorky Park in Russia.

In 1961, he teamed with the Honolulu Symphony Orchestra for a 3-performance run as Lieutenant B.F. Pinkerton in Madame Butterfly. He appeared as Don Ottavio opposite Cesare Siepi and Leontyne Price in the NBC Opera Theatre television production of Don Giovanni. As part of an ensemble at a 1967 White House concert given in honor of Turkish president Cevdet Sunay, Davis sang the role of protagonist Prince Caprice in the Opera Company of Boston's presentation of the Jacques Offenbach operetta Voyage to the Moon. In his global travels, he expanded his repertoire by learning songs in the languages of countries he visited. His 1968 debut at Carnegie Hall was held on June 11 in honor of Kamehameha Day, and was a showcase of his multilingual musical style.

== Later life ==
His father died in 1965. Davis returned home permanently in 1968 to care for his mother. Honolulu Mayor Neal Blaisdell declared January 19, 1968 as "Charles K.L. Davis Day in Honolulu". His mother died in 1972.

Davis moved away from opera performances and began to entertain in local clubs, such as the Waikiki venues of the Rhumba Line and the Halekulani, as well as numerous appearances on the Hawaii Calls radio broadcasts. At the Kemoo Farms restaurant in Wahiawa, Davis maintained a 13-year twice-weekly performance schedule during the buffet luncheons.

His brother Francis died in 1989. In the remaining years of his life, Davis suffered from diabetes, frequently requiring hospitalization. When he died on October 31, 1991, Don Ho reminisced, "He was probably the nicest guy you'd meet in the business. I never heard anybody say anything bad about him."

== Awards and legacy ==
- 1983 – Radio station KCCN and Bank of Hawaii featured Davis on the Heritage Series program showcasing entertainers who contributions were fundamental to Hawaiian music.
- 1988 – Lifetime Achievement Award at the Na Hoku Hanohano Awards from the Hawai'i Academy of Recording Arts.
- 2006 – Inducted into the Hawaiian Music Hall of Fame.

== Discography ==
7" promotionals

- "Hanohano Hanalei" (1959) Everest
- "Adventures In Paradise / Where On Earth" (unknown date) Everest

Albums

- Ray Kinney Presents Charles K.L. Davis At The Royal Hawaiian (1958) Everest
- Charles K.L. Davis Sings Romantic Arias From Famous Operas (1958) Everest / World Record Club
- Songs Of Hawaii ( 1959) Everest
- Front Row Center (1959) Everest
- Adventures in Paradise (1960) Everest
- Hawaii's Golden Favorites (1961) Decca
- Love Songs Of The Mediterranean (1961) Everest
- The Merry Widow (1962) Columbia Masterworks
- Charles K.L. Davis Sings Songs From The Magic Islands (1962) Decca
- The Exciting Voice of Charles K.L. Davis (1963) Colpix
- Pray For Peace (1967) Sunset
- Remember I Gave My Aloha And Other Songs By R. Alex Anderson (1978) Lehua
- Charlie (1981) Bishop Corporation
- Charlie Sings Kolohe (1981) Lehua
- At Home (unknown date) Hula
- Songs of Hawaiian Royalty (unknown date) Royal
- Hawaiian Adventure (unknown date) Sunset
- Hawaii's Yesterday (unknown date) Hana Hou
- At Home (unknown date) Hula
