= Maddy Lam =

Hawaiian composer and singer

- Instruments: piano and vocals
- Award: Hawaiian Music Hall of Fame

Madeline Kaululehuaohaili Lam (November 27, 1910 – June 22, 1985) was a Hawaiian musician, songwriter, and producer. The composer of several Hawaiian music standards such as "Singing Bamboo" and "Maile Lei," Lam was inducted into the Hawaiian Music Hall of Fame in 2000.

== Early life and education ==
Madeline Kaululehuaohaili (Note: Spelled "Kaululehuaohaile" on her grave marker.) Nicholas was born in Honolulu on November 27, 1910. Her mother, Tamar Kamala Kalahele Kapewa, composed songs for her children to sing, while her father, Robert Keolaokalani Nicholas, taught Maddy and her brothers to play the ukelele.

Maddy attended Maunaʻolu Seminary on Maui, where she learned to play the piano. She married Charles Kin Young Lam in 1928; they had one son.

== Career as an entertainer ==
Lam got her start singing in a number of girls' glee clubs. Along with Lei Collins and Julia Doyle, she was in a group called Cissy Lake's Singers, which performed for dignitaries such as Queen Lili`uokalani and Doris Duke.

Lam was a soloist on the radio show "Across The Sea to NBC" along with Alfred Apaka. She also performed as a soloist on the radio program Hawaii Calls hosted by Webley Edwards. She was the dinner-hour pianist at the Halekūlani hotel in the 1960s. She retired from performing in 1981.

Island Recording Studio was started in 1954 by Lam and Milla Leal Peterson Yap; Lam was the composer, arranger, director, and producer, while Yap was the technical director. The studio produced twenty 78 rpm and 45 rpm single records, mainly for hula studios and students. They also released a 33 1/3 rpm album titled "Singing Bamboo - Songs of Modern Hawaii," which included Lam's most popular compositions, such as "Nani Venuse," "Kipu-Kai," "Po La'ila," and "Ka Lehua i Milia," which were composed with Mary Kawena Pukui.

Some of Lam's best-known songs are now Hawaiian music standards, including "Singing Bamboo" and "Maile Lei". She partnered with Mary Kawena Pukui to write several hits, including "Pua `Ahihi" and "Hanauma". She also composed "Kealoha" with Lei Collins.

== Death and honors ==
Lam died in Honolulu on June 22, 1985, and was buried at Nuuanu Memorial Park.

In 1984, Lam was honored with the Sidney Grayson Award, the predecessor to the Nā Hōkū Hanohano Lifetime Achievement Award. In 2000, she was inducted into the Hawaiian Music Hall of Fame.
