= Hilo Hattie =

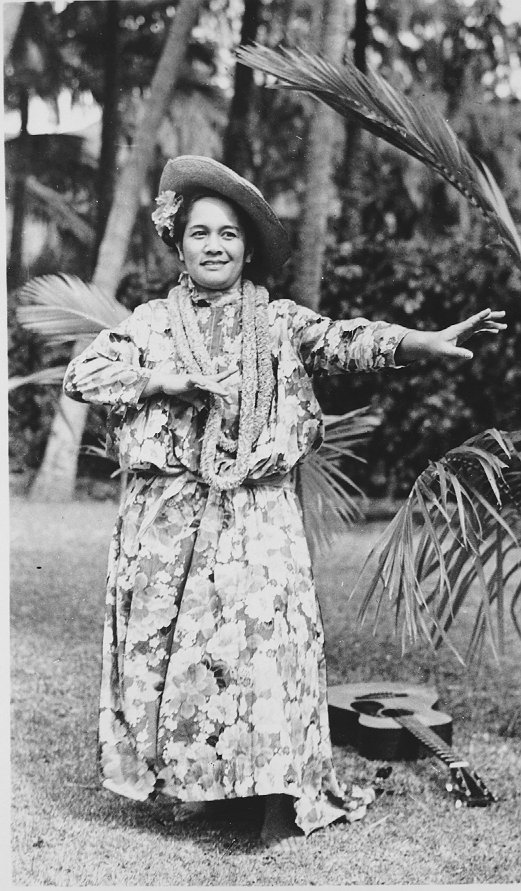
- Hilo Hattie in 1941

Background information
- Also known as: Hilo Hattie, Mrs. Carlyle Nelson
- Born: Clarissa Haili; October 28, 1901; Honolulu, Oahu, Hawaii
- Died: December 12, 1979 (aged 78) Honolulu, Hawaii
- Genre: Hawaiian
- Occupations: Singer, musician
- Instruments: Vocals, ukulele
- Years active: 1920–1979
- Labels: Columbia; Decca

Hilo Hattie (born Clarissa Haili, October 28, 1901 – December 12, 1979) was a Hawaiian singer, hula dancer, actress and comedienne of Native Hawaiian ancestry.

== Early life and career ==
Hattie was born in Honolulu, Hawaii. She loved to dance the hula and sing in the church choir. She began teaching at Waipahu Elementary School in 1923, entertaining her students with what would become her comedy hula routines. In 1930, she married Theodore Inter. By 1936, she had joined Louise Akeo's Royal Hawaiian Girls Glee Club singing at venues around Oahu. The group got $25 per appearance to distribute among the 25 members.

The Don McDiarmid Sr-Johnny Noble song When Hilo Hattie Does the Hilo Hop became her signature tune. McDiarmid intended the 1935 song to be danced by the typical beautifully smooth hula dancer. But in 1936, while the band was performing as shipboard entertainment on a cruise to Portland, Oregon, the dancer meant to perform it fell ill. Hilo Hattie, who claimed to have never had a hula lesson in her life, ran with it as a comedy piece, and it became a huge success in its time. Clara legally changed her name to Hilo Hattie, when she performed her second signature song, The Cockeyed Mayor of Kaunakakai, in the movie Song of the Islands. From 1939, Hilo Hattie was a favorite among the military.

== Fame, film, and television work ==
By 1940, Harry Owens was conducting the Royal Hawaiian Hotel orchestra and hired her. Hattie joined the Webley Edwards-hosted Hawaii Calls broadcasts that went out to 600 radio stations around the world. From that point on, she became a global household name, touring the world and performing in movies and on television, with a recurring role in Hawaii Five-O as Mrs. Pruitt. In 1945, she was referred to as "the Polynesian Sophie Tucker" when she entertained at the Holland Supper Club in Eugene, Oregon. The divorced Clara married bandleader and violinist, Carlyle Nelson, in Las Vegas in 1949.

She was still touring the mainland in 1956, when she performed four days and nights at the Merced County, California Spring Fair. Hilo Hattie and her Hawaiian Revue played the Peabody Auditorium in Daytona Beach, Florida in January 1959. Hilo Hattie began doing two shows a night, six nights a week, at the Kaiser's Hawaiian Village, later renamed Hilton Hawaiian Village Tapa Room in 1960. It was an arrangement that continued for more than a decade. In 1961, she appeared in the motion picture Blue Hawaii with Elvis Presley. In June 1963, she entertained at the Sportsmen of Stanislaus luau in Modesto, California.

== Personal life and death ==
In 1972, she recalled having once made an attempt at retirement but live performing was too much fun. Hilo Hattie died of cancer on December 12, 1979.

Hattie's first husband was Ted H. Inter whom she divorced in 1946. She married musician Carlyle Nelson in 1949. He survived her. She is buried in the National Memorial Cemetery of the Pacific (Section U, Grave 653-A) under her married name, Clara Nelson.

== Retail stores ==
Hilo Hattie is the brand name of a group of stores selling Hawaiian and Hawaiian-themed merchandise. The stores were founded by Richard and Evelyn Margolis in 1965 and operated by the Margolis Manufacturing and Retail Company (Hilo, Hawaii) until the sale of the company to James Romig of Pomare Ltd in 1979. As of 2010, there were seven Hilo Hattie stores in the state of Hawaii; at one time the firm operated stores outside of Hawaii as well, primarily in California, Arizona, and Nevada. In 2023, Josh Margolis, grandson of Richard and Evelyn Margolis, acquired Pomare Ltd along with the Hilo Hattie retail stores, marking a return of the brand to the Margolis family.

== Discography ==
- Hilo Hattie at the Tapa Room (1965) LP album LSP-3442 (RCA Victor)
- Hilo Hattie at the Hawaiian Village LP album HH-100 (Paradise)
- South Seas Sadie / Hasegawa General Store (Decca)
- Hawaii's Favorite Music (2000) CD (Hula)
- Hawaiian Melodies (Columbia)
- My Hawaii (Hui)

== Filmography ==
- Song of the Islands (1942)
- Tahiti Nights (1944)
- Miss Tatlock's Millions (1948)
- City Beneath the Sea (1953)
- Ma and Pa Kettle at Waikiki (1955)
- Kismet (1955)
- Suicide Battalion (1958)
- Blue Hawaii (1961)

== Television work ==
- Schlitz Playhouse of Stars (1954)
- Hawaii Five-O (1968–1970)

== Accolades ==
The Hawaiʻi Academy of Recording Arts awarded Hilo Hattie the 1978 Na Hoku Hanohano Sidney Grayson Award for lifetime achievement.
