= Alice Nāmakelua =

Hawaiian composer and performer

- Cover art for Auntie Alice Ku‘uleialohapoina‘ole Namakelua, 1974
- Born: August 12, 1892; Honokaʻa
- Died: April 27, 1987 (aged 94)
- Musical career
- Instruments: slack-key guitar; voice
- Years active: 1927–1987
- Label: Hula Records

"Auntie" Alice Kuʻuleialohapoinaʻole Kanakaoluna Nāmakelua (1892–1987) was a Hawaiian composer and performer. Nāmakelua was also a kumu hula dancer and lei-maker. She was an expert performer of the slack-key guitar and a master of the Hawaiian language. Nāmakelua was a mentor of other musicians and wrote around 180 songs of her own. She was inducted into the Hawaiian Music Hall of Fame in 2011.

== Biography ==
Nāmakelua was born in Kīhālani on Hawaii Island. As a teenager, she sang for the deposed queen, Liliuokalani. She was taught hula in her teen years by David Kaho'aleawai Kaluhiakalani, who had been the chanter for Prince Jonah Kūhiō Kalanianaʻole. Nāmakelua spent most of her life on O'ahu.

Nāmakelua worked for the City of Honolulu's Parks and Recreation department, and some of her songs were composed for the Kamehameha Day Parades. Nāmakelua would work on the Maui float for the parade, starting in 1944. While working for the city, she also taught hula, Hawaiian language and music classes. She was also the playground director.

She taught hula, song and the ukulele for a short time on Kauai in 1959, where she resided with mayor Francis Ching and his wife. In the 1970s, she was part of the Hawaiian Cultural Renaissance and noted for her guitar playing. In 1978, she was one of the special award winners of the Lifetime Achievement Awards from the Hawai'i Academy of Recording Arts. In 1980, she received a Na Makua Mahalo ia award, which was originally developed to recognize the musical accomplishments of members of the Church of Jesus Christ of Latter Day Saints.

== Selected works ==
=== Songs ===
- Haleakalā Hula (originally, Kuahiwi Nani 1941)
- I‘iwi a‘o Hilo (1950)
- Aia i Hilo ka Ua Kani Lehua (1956)
- Hanohano nō ‘o Hawai‘i (1958)
- Aloha K'olau (1959)
- Lei Hala O Kaua'i (1959)
- Polynesian Welcome (1967)
- Ka'ahumanu (1973)

=== Album ===
- Namakelua, Alice; Lilikoi, Violet Pahu (1974). Ku'uleialohapoina'ole (vinyl LP). Hula Records. OCLC 900330872. HS 552.

=== Bibliography ===
- Namakelua, Alice (1973). "Aunty Alice" Namakelua's lifetime Hawaiian compositions (in Hawaiian). Honolulu: Hienz Guenther Pink. OCLC 1120749658.
