= Marlene Sai =

American actress

- Born: Marlene Mikahala Sai; December 14, 1941 (age 83); Honolulu, Hawaii
- Occupation(s): Singer, actress
- Years active: 1959–present
- Spouse: Herb Cockett (divorced)
- Children: Cassie Cockett, Mahela Cockett
- Website: marlenesai.com

Marlene Mikahala Sai (born December 14, 1941) is a Hawaiian classic-style female solo singer, born in Honolulu of Hawaiian–Chinese heritage. The San Francisco Chronicle refers to Marlene Sai as one of the true icons of the islands. The Santa Cruz Sentinel refers to Sai as a living legend of Hawaiian music. PBS Hawaii's Leslie Wilcox says of Sai "There are only a handful of true divas in Hawaiian music, women who wrap their powerful voices with grace, elegance and beauty. You can add to the list Marlene Sai."

== Early years ==
Sai is from Kaimuki, Hawaii, and a product of the Kamehameha school system. She released her first record in 1959. Sai was taught the basics of singing and mentored by her uncle Andy Cummings, considered another legend of Hawaiian singing and songwriting. Cummings taught his niece the love song "Kainoa" written by his friend Jimmy Taka when he found out he was dying of cancer. The song was for his wife. Cummings put the song down on paper and later taught it to his then-teenage niece, Marlene Sai. "Kainoa" went on to become Sai's first hit and title for her debut album. Sai was discovered by Hawaiian entertainer Don Ho before he was famous while managing his mother's restaurant lounge Honey's in Kaneohe on the island of Oahu.

== Singing ==
Sai, just out of high school, became a teenage recording star. Sai toured Japan in 1962 and has an extensive following there. In 2007 Sai hosted the 23rd annual Ka Himeni Ana singing contest at the Hawaii Theatre. In 2008, Sai performed in concert in New York City at Carnegie Hall. Sai's album Kainoa was considered 21st out of 50 of the all-time great albums of Hawaii by Honolulu magazine in 2004. In the article it states that it wasn't recorded under the most ideal circumstances. When she signed with Sounds of Hawaii, the new label hadn't even finished building its studio. Kainoa was recorded inside the bus depot once located on King Street. "We recorded late at night, when it was quiet, buses weren't moving and you hoped an airplane didn't fly overhead," Sai says. "But I had Sonny Chillingworth on slack key and Don Ho on the organ behind me, so we still had a ball."

=== Records and CDs ===
- Kainoa 1959
- Sweet Someone
- Best Of Marlene Sai 1967
- Hana Hou
- Not Pau
- Marlene Sai 1985
- I Love You 1994
- Mele No Ka ʻOe 1996
- Marlene & Mahela 1999
- Legacy 2010

== Acting ==
Sai's debut as an actress was in 1984 when she starred in the one-actress play Hear Me, O My People by Donald Berrigan. In it she portrayed Queen Liliʻuokalani. She was also invited to perform the play for members of the United States Congress at the Folger Shakespeare Theatre in Washington, D.C. As a spinoff from the play, Sai also portrayed Queen Liliʻuokalani, Hawaii's last monarch, in the PBS documentary Betrayal. The made-for-TV film premiered in Hawaii on January 17, 1993, on the 100th anniversary of the overthrow it depicted.

Sai's other roles include Makua Wahine Luka, in the 1986 TV series Magnum PI. Sai portrayed Bloody Mary in the 2007–2008 Hawaii Opera Theatre's production of South Pacific in Blaisdell Concert Hall in Honolulu. In 2008 Sai starred in the dinner show This Is Hawai'i at the Hale Koa Hotel. Marlene Sai is also known for The Short List (2011), Maui (2017) and Hawaii Five-0 (2010).

== Recognition and awards ==
In 1986, Sai received the Hawai'i Academy of Recording Arts (HARA) Na Hoku Hanohano Award for 'Best Female Vocalist' In 1987, Sai was given the "Po'okela Award" from the Hawaii State Theatre Council for her portrayal of Queen Liliʻuokalani in a one-actress play called Hear Me, O My People. In 2004, HARA honored her with Na Hoku Hanohano Lifetime Achievement Award for her accomplishments in music and recording. In September 2007, she was inducted into the Hawaiian Music Hall of Fame by the Hawaiian Music Foundation. Her first LP release, Kainoa, was included in the book "The 50 Greatest Hawaii Albums".

== Other interest ==
Sai is currently president of the Hawaii Academy of Recording Arts and on the board of the Honolulu Boys Choir and the Mayor's Office of Culture and the Arts.
