= Royal Hawaiian Girls Glee Club =

Chorale group

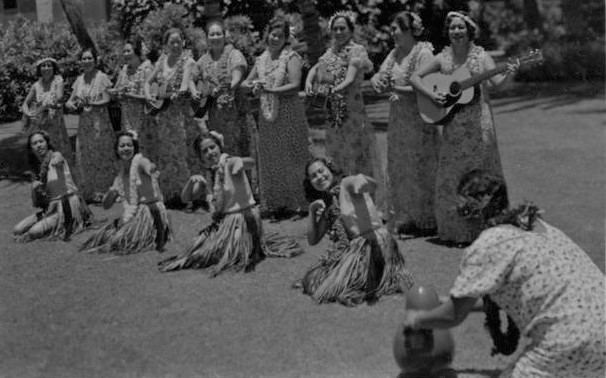
Royal Hawaiian Girls Glee Club c.1935. Hilo Hattie is standing with guitar at the right-hand end. Others in the image are (L-R) Singers: Thelma Anahu, Hannah Attwood, Louise Akeo Silva (leader), Kuualoha Treadway, Helen Alama, Imogene Eaton, Mary Lum Saffery, and Harriet Smith. Dancers: Tootsie Notley, Delphine Ornellas, Caroline Hubbell, and Ululani Barrett. Chanter: Ruby Notley Namaho

The Royal Hawaiian Girls Glee Club is a chorale group of performers in Hawaii, founded in 1917. Initially a group created through a YWCA program, they became the resident performers at the Royal Hawaiian Hotel. They sang on the first broadcast of Hawaii Calls, and for six decades were the featured entertainment at the Kodak Hula Show in Waikiki.

== Background ==
The Royal Hawaiian Girls Glee Club was founded as the YWCA Hawaiian Girls Glee Club c.1917 by Louise Akeo Silva (1893–1980). Known by her maiden name of Akeo until 1951, Silva followed in the footsteps of her athletic older sisters May Akeo Kamaka (1887–1936) and Amelia Akeo Guerrero (1885–1977), by joining the YWCA in 1912. When the Hawaiian Girls Club formed in 1916, the Honolulu YWCA was creating several ethnic clubs, geared towards specific polling results. Hawaiian girls had expressed enthusiasm about athletics and music, but it is unclear when a separate glee club was formed under Silva, and the year varies by individual accounts. Trained in traditional hula by Mrs. Kekaha Ross of Maui, Silva became an entertainment coordinator at social gatherings for Princess Abigail Campbell Kawānanakoa (1882–1945), a strict adherent to the authenticity of Hawaiian culture.

== Initial fame ==
Princess Kawānanakoa arranged for the glee club to perform for the opening of the Royal Hawaiian Hotel in 1927. Hotel manager Arthur Benaglia retained them as the hotel's in-house entertainment troupe, giving them the new name they would be known as from that point forward. In addition to performing at the hotel, they made numerous appearances at events of various sizes around the islands. Pan American World Airways began running flights to Hawaii in 1935, landing at Pearl City, where the glee club greeted the incoming flights. Their audiences first reached beyond Hawaii when they were contracted to perform in San Francisco and also Vancouver, British Columbia.

One of the glee club's most famous alumni was Hilo Hattie (1901–1979), who joined in 1935 and remembered the group as her big break into show business. She had been a school teacher whose real name was Kalala (or Clara) Haili Inter. When Hawaii Calls began its decades-long run in 1935, the glee club was the first group to perform on the show, which also served as a springboard to international fame for Hilo Hattie.

During those years, each member received $1 per appearance. The group was composed of women who were either housewives and/or otherwise employed in non-entertainment industries. Silva kept her day job as a secretary for decades and, in addition to establishing a savings fund for the members, prodded them to further their formal education beyond basic school.

== Kodak Hula Show ==
Kodak vice president Frederick "Fritz" Bender Herman (1902 -1990) collaborated with Silva and the Royal Hawaiian Girls Glee Club in 1937 to create the Kodak Hula Show in Waikiki. He was the original master of ceremonies until World War II when he enlisted in the United States Navy, and the show ceased operations. Kodak's sponsorship resumed in 1949, with Silva as mistress of ceremonies. After Silva's death in 1980, management was taken over by May Brown, who had been one of the original performers. Kodak decided in 1999 that the annual $550,000 operational expense was not cost-effective for their corporation and dropped their sponsorship. The Hogan Family Foundation, owners of Pleasant Hawaiian Holidays, stepped in as the show's sponsor, giving it another three years of operation. The glee club continued with the show until it came to an end in 2002. It was estimated that 20 million people had attended the show over the decades.

== Discography ==
Partial listings

Brunswick label

Johnny Noble featuring the Royal Hawaiian Girls' Glee Club

- 1930 LAE 825 – "Kalakaua"
- 1958 LAE 826 B – "Hualalai"
- 1958 LAE 829 A – "Royal Hawaiian Hotel"
- 1958 LAE 830 A – "Haole Hula"

Victor label

Recorded March 1935

- BVE-89001 "Beautiful Kahana"
- BVE-89002 "Pehea hoi an"
- BVE-89003 "Alekoki"
- BVE-89004 "Haole hula "
- BVE-89005 "Liliu e"
- BVE-89041 "Malihini mele"
- BVE-89042 "Papalina lahilahi"
- BVE-89043 "Waikiki "
- BVE-89044 "Hui e"
- BVE-89045 "Mai poina oe ia'u"
- BVE-89046 "Alekoki"
- BVE-89047 "Song of the Islands"

Miscellaneous

Years not listed

- HT 197 – "Pidgin English", written by Charles E. King, noted as produced by the Advertiser Publishing Co., Inc. Royal Hawaiian Girls Glee Club with vocals by Kalala Haili (aka Hilo Hattie)
- HT 200 – "When Hilo Hattie Does The Hilo Hop", written by Don McDiarmid, noted as produced by the Advertiser Publishing Co., Inc. Royal Hawaiian Girls Glee Club with vocals by Kalala Haili (aka Hilo Hattie)
- HT 201 – "Manuela Boy", written by Johnny Noble, noted as produced by the Advertiser Publishing Co., Inc. Royal Hawaiian Girls Glee Club with vocals by Kalala Haili (aka Hilo Hattie)
- HT 207 – "Hula Town" written by Don McDiarmid, vocal by Hilo Hattie, Royal Hawaiian Girls Glee Club, noted as produced by the Advertiser Publishing Co., Inc. Royal Hawaiian Girls Glee Club with vocals by Kalala Haili (aka Hilo Hattie), "The Voice of Hawaii" KGU Radio Artists
- HT 208 – "My Wahine and Me" written by Don McDiarmid, Hilo Hattie – Clara Inter, Royal Hawaiian Girls Glee Club, noted as produced by the Advertiser Publishing Co., Inc. "The Voice of Hawaii" KGU Radio Artists

== See also ==
- Myrtle K. Hilo

== Gallery ==
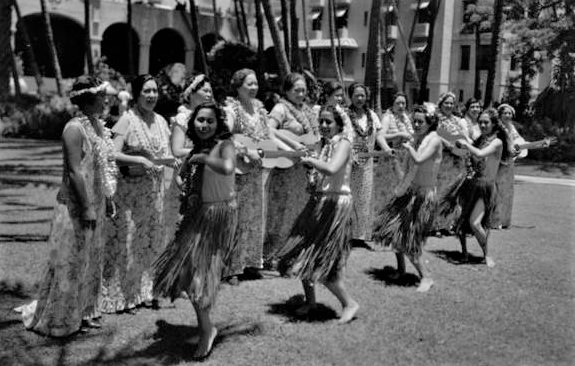
At the Royal Hawaiian Hotel

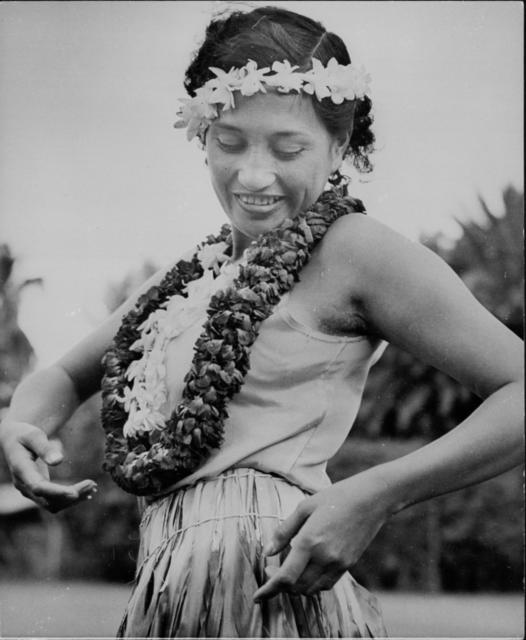
Hula dancer Salome Pickard

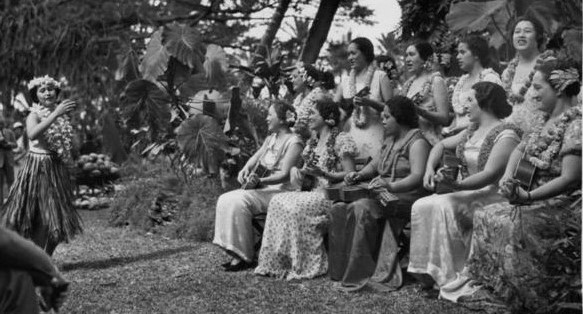
With hula dancer Ululani Barrett
