= Lizzie Alohikea =

American singer and composer (died 1939)

- Born: Elizabeth Kanamu; 1880s Hanalei, Hawaii, U.S.
- Died: July 15, 1939; Honolulu, Hawaii, U.S.
- Occupations: Singer, composer

Elizabeth Kahau Alohikea (born 1880s – July 15, 1939), known professionally as Lizzie Alohikea, was an American singer and composer based in Hawaii. She was a vocalist with the Royal Hawaiian Band, and was inducted into the Hawaiian Music Hall of Fame in 2008.

== Biography ==
Alohikea was born in Hanalei, the daughter of James Benjamin Kanamu and Luluhiwalani (Lulu) Lahela Kauaunui Kanamu. As Lizzie Alohikea, a mezzo-soprano, she sang with the Royal Hawaiian Band for 23 years, in concerts, recordings, and radio broadcasts. She was described as "a great big woman with a great big voice," and is said to have sung "Aloha Oe" and "Na Lei o Hawaii" over 10,000 times by the time she retired from performing in 1937. She was granted a monthly pension by the Honolulu pension board.

Alohikea married fellow musician Alfred U. Alohikea. They married in 1906, and she filed for divorce in 1921. She was survived by two children when she died in 1939, probably in her fifties, in Honolulu. She was inducted into the Hawaiian Music Hall of Fame in 2008.

== Compositions ==
- "Nani Kaua'i" (1918, 1928)
- "Radio Hula" (1920s)
- "Alekoki" (1927, with lyrics by King Kalākaua)
- "Opelu" (1935)
