= Beverly Noa =

Hawaiian hula dancer

- Born: June 14, 1933; Los Angeles
- Died: October 19, 2017 (aged 84); The Queen's Medical Center

Beverly Kauiokanahele Noa (June 14, 1933 – October 19, 2017) was a Hawaiian hula dancer. Noa was the 1952 winner of the Miss Hawaii contest and was inducted into the Hawaiian Music Hall of Fame in 2014.

== Early years and career ==
Beverly Kathleen Rivera was born June 14, 1933, in Los Angeles, California. Her parents were Benny Rivera and Victoria Miller. She was raised in Honolulu and graduated from Farrington High School.

Beverly was introduced to hula by her teacher Louise Beamer when she was six years old, and she would later study with the renowned artist ʻIolani Luahine. At age eighteen she was crowned Miss Hawaii 1952 and competed in the 1953 Miss America contest, where she placed in the top ten. She began her career as a featured dancer at the well-known Waikiki bar Don the Beachcomber.

Hawaiian tourism expert Robert C. Allen said that Noa "took Hawaiian hula dancing to new levels" and described her as the most popular Island dancer of her time. Noa performed at many of Hawaii's most famous showrooms, including the Tapa Room at the Hilton Hawaiian Village, and she was a frequently headliner at the Royal Hawaiian Hotel and the Halekulani. She performed regularly on radio program Hawaii Calls with her husband Ed Kenney. She was best known for her graceful performance of "Lovely Hula Hands". Hula teacher Michael Pili Pang described her artistry: "Her presence is unforgettable. Her hula is pure art. Her style of movement is like watching poetry in motion as she transports you to a romantic place in the mountains or to a spectacular sunset along a beach."

Noa traveled across the U.S. as the Hawaii Visitor Bureau's "poster girl". She promoted the Kamehameha Garment Company and worked as a model for Alfred Shaheen. Noa also was part of the first Calvin Klein retail store in Hawaii and worked for fourteen years as the manager of Chanel in Hawai‘i before retiring in 2002.

== Death and legacy ==
She died at The Queen's Medical Center in Honolulu on October 19, 2017.

Noa was inducted into the Hawaiian Music Hall of Fame in 2015 as part of the class of 2014. In March 2017, she was honored with the annual I Ola Mau Ka Hula award.

== Personal life ==
Noa married twice and had two children. She married roller derby star Fred Lee Noa, Sr. and together they had one son, Fred Noa, Jr. She later married singer Ed Kenney Jr., with whom she had their son Ed Kenney III, although they divorced shortly before their son was born. Noa raised her sons as a single mother in the Kāhala neighborhood of Honolulu. Her son Ed Kenney is a chef and restaurateur who hosted the 2016-2017 PBS television series Family Ingredients. Noa appeared on the first episode of the series to discuss their family's relationship with poi.
