= Ed Kenney =

American singer and actor (1933–2018)

Edward Kamanaloha Kenney, Jr. (August 8, 1933 – October 5, 2018) was an American singer and actor from Hawaii best known for the role of "Wang Ta" in the original Broadway production of Flower Drum Song. In retirement, he lived on the island of Kaua‘i and occasionally made public appearances.

== Family ==
Born in Honolulu on Oahu to a Hawaiian-Chinese mother and a Swedish-Irish father. He married Judy Bailey and lived on Kauai.

Kenney was married to hula dancer Beverly Noa and was the father of Honolulu restaurateur, Edward Kenney, III.

Kenney and Noa headlined shows at the Royal Hawaiian Hotel and the Halekulani Hotel for years. They reunited for a Honolulu television show on KGMB-TV in the 1980s.

== Stage credits ==
=== Broadway ===
- 13 Daughters as Mana, Prince of Hawai‘i (1961)
- Flower Drum Song as Wang Ta (1958–1960)
- Shangri-La as Rimshi (1956)

=== Honolulu Community Theater ===
- Principal "Ali Baba" role during late 1960s in large hit production of Kismet musical.
- Various other productions (1950s and after)

=== University of Oregon ===
- Brigadoon

=== President William McKinley High School Theater ===
- 13 Daughters as Chun (late 1980s)

=== Hawaii Theatre ===
- 13 Daughters as Kahuna (early 1990s)

== Discography ==
=== Albums ===
==== Solo ====
- Exotic Sounds of the Spice Island (Columbia, 1960)
- My Hawai‘i (Columbia, 1962) (later reissued with a different cover on a Columbia budget label, Harmony)
- Ed Kenney's Hawaii (ABC/Paramount, 1962) (later reissued with a different cover by Decca, 196?)
- Somewhere in Hawai‘i (Waikiki, 1964)
- Waikiki (Decca, 1966)
- Royal Hawaiian Luau (Decca, 1967)
- An Island (Lehua, 1977)

==== Included ====
- Hawaii's Favorite Christmas Songs – Vol 2 (1999)
- Hawaii's Sunset Melodies (1996)
- Hawaii's Golden Treasures (1996)
- Hawaii's Favorite Christmas Songs (1993)
- Flower Drum Song: 1958 Original Broadway Cast (1958)

=== Singles ===
- "Numbah One Day of Christmas" the Hawaiian Pidgin version of The Twelve Days of Christmas

Co-wrote this with Eaton "Bob" Magoon, Jr. (13 Daughters composer) and Gordon Phelps.
