= Ray Kinney =

American singer, musician and composer

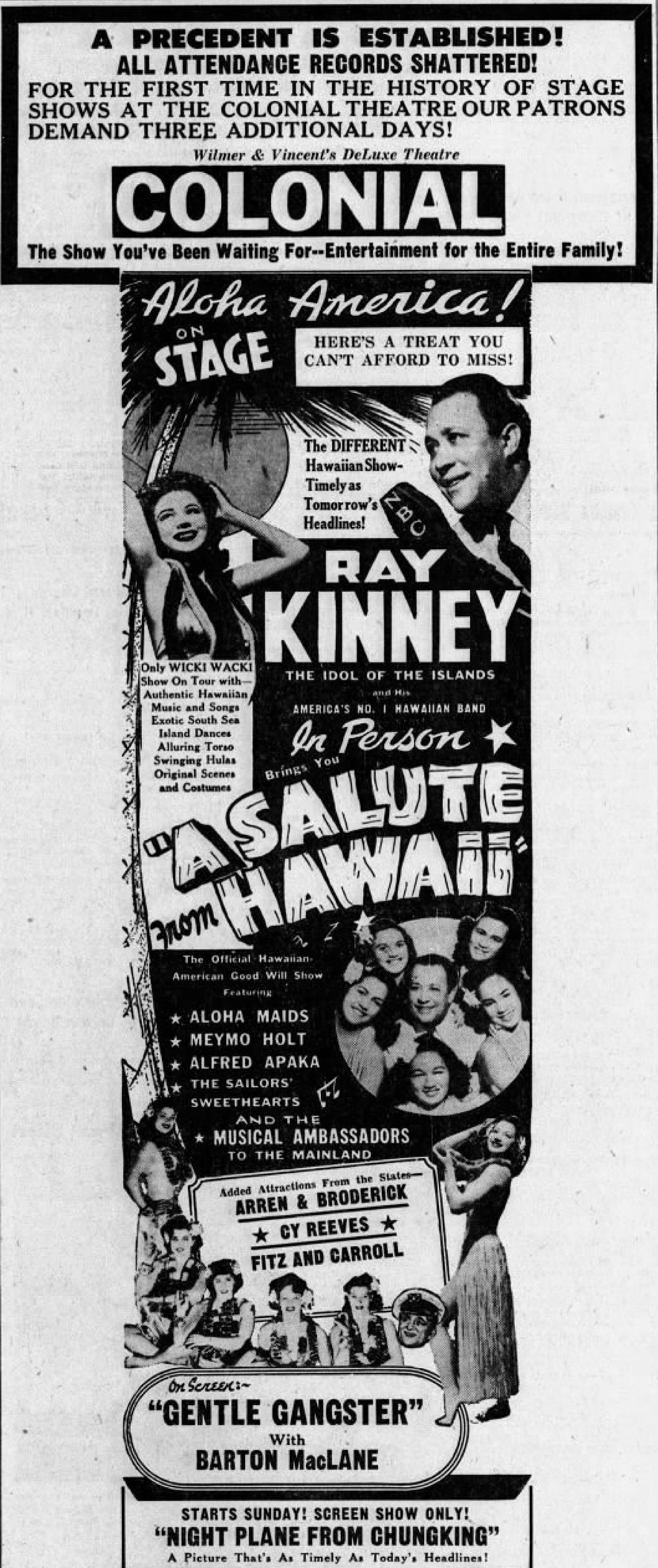
- Newspaper advertisement for 1943 show

Background information
- Born: September 26, 1900; Hilo, Hawaii
- Died: February 1, 1972 (aged 71) Honolulu, Hawaii
- Genre: Hawaiian
- Occupations: Singer, musician, composer, bandleader, actor
- Instruments: Vocals, Ukulele, Bass Fiddle
- Years active: 1915–1972
- Labels: Brunswick, Decca, RCA
- Formerly of: Johnny Noble, Harry Owens, Hawaii Calls, Alfred Apaka, Eddie Kamae
- Website: raykinney.net

Ray Kinney (September 26, 1900 – February 1, 1972) was a Hawaiian-born singer, musician, composer, orchestra leader, and performer on radio, stage and screen.

== Early years ==
Kinney was born in Hilo, Hawaii, to Irish-Hawaiian parents William & Pilialoha Kinney. At age 15 he and his six brothers were sent to school in Salt Lake City, Utah.

== Career ==
Already skilled on the ukulele and with a fine tenor voice, Ray and his brothers formed their own band while still in school and began touring the western US. He returned to Hawaii in 1920 upon the death of his mother.

In 1925 Ray was cast as the lead in the Island opera "Prince of Hawaii" by noted Hawaiian composer Charles E. King. The show began touring in California in 1926.

In 1928 bandleader Johnny Noble chose Kinney among others to appear on his radio show. The show originated from station KPO in San Francisco and was basically an hour long promotion for Hawaiian tourism. Later that year Brunswick Records signed Noble, with Kinney as one of the singers, to a contract that resulted in 110 singles being issued. Those 78s and the show helped introduce and popularize Hawaiian music in the US mainland and lead to a national tour and then an 11-month engagement at the Palace Hotel in San Francisco..

While working in a Taro factory in 1934, Kinney was approached by bandleader Harry Owens to join his orchestra for their opening at the Royal Hawaiian Hotel.

Ray appeared on the premiere broadcast of Webley Edwards' "Hawaii Calls" radio show from the Moana Hotel in July 1935. He regularly appeared on the show for a number of years.

Decca Records signed Johnny Noble and His Orchestra, with Kinney as vocalist, to a contract in 1936. The "phenomenal" sales results kept them under contract for four years.

Kinney became the first Hawaiian entertainer to be in a major Broadway production when he and the "Aloha Maids" were cast in the Olsen and Johnson Broadway revue "Hellzapoppin'" in September 1938. The show lasted 1,404 performances and ran until December 1941. 1938 also saw Kinney beat out the likes of Rudy Vallée and Guy Lombardo in a New York popularity poll of American singers as well as begin a four-year stint in the "Hawaiian Room" of New York's Hotel Lexington leading his own orchestra.

Alfred Apaka was hired by Kinney in 1940 as his vocalist at the "Hawaiian Room" and was featured on several Kinney recordings.

Kinney's 1941 musical short "Ana Lani" is frequently mixed up with the 1947 "Hawaiian Hula Song".

During the war years, Kinney toured 157 military bases and clubs becoming a favorite of Hawaii's 442nd Regiment.

The end of the war saw Kinney return to Hawaii and join Don McDiarmid's Orchestra performing at the Kewalo Inn as vocalist and bass fiddle player.

In 1949, Kinney discovered Eddie Kamae and took him on tour and finally, in 1959, adding Kamae to the "Royal Hawaiian Hotel Orchestra".

Kinney also composed many songs during his career including "Across the Sea", "Not Pau", "Hawaiian Hospitality", "Maile Lau Li'ili'i", "Island Serenade", "Kalapaki Bay", "Ululani", and "Leimana."

Ray signed his last recording contract at age 65, with RCA, noting it was "somewhat of a miracle" that his recording career had lasted nearly forty years and almost 600 songs.

== Personal life ==
Kinney married Dawn Holt, and they had five children, daughters Leimana, Meymo, Raylani and sons Rankin, and Rayner.

== Death ==
Ray Kinney died on February 1, 1972, in Honolulu, Hawaii.

== Awards and recognition ==
2002 Hawaiian Music Hall of Fame Honoree
