= Alice Angeline Johnson =

Alice Angeline Johnson (July 24, 1912 – November 1982) was a Hawaiian singer, composer, and member of the Royal Hawaiian Band. Among her notable compositions are "Aloha 'Ia No 'O Maui," "Hanohano Olinda," "Kaulana Ke Kuahiwi Haleakala," and "Ho'okipa Paka." In 2008 she was inducted to the Hawaiian Music Hall of Fame.
