= Jesse Kalima =

American musician (1920–1980)

- Born: Jesse Kaleihia Andre Kalima; October 31, 1920; Honolulu, Oahu, Hawaii
- Died: July 13, 1980 (aged 59)
- Occupation: Live performer
- Instrument: Ukulele
- Years active: 1935-1980
- Past members: Junior Kalima, Henry Mucha, Honey Kalima, Albert Kalima, Julian Gaspar, Henry Mucha, Richard Kauhi, Little Joe Kekaoha, Johnny Waikiki

Jesse Kaleihia Andre Kalima (1920–1980) was an ukulele player.

He was born in Honolulu on October 31, 1920, at a time when the ukulele was just becoming recognized for its capability to be played as a solo instrument.

== Early years ==
Kalima's mother, Amy Pakiko of Napoʻopoʻo, was a teacher a singer and musician and taught him to play the ʻukulele at the age of six. In 1926, Jesse's father died and his mother married Solomon Kalima. At age 9, Jesse would perform while his mother did the hula for territorial political rallies.

Kalima attended Farrington High School and played in the orchestra and school band while a student. He loved the marches he learned and when he learned a march on the tenor saxophone and clarinet, he would figure out how to play it on the ukulele. At age 15, Kalima burst into the public music scene, and is credited with accelerating the development of the solo ukulele, when he won the 1935 Territorial Amateur Contest at Honolulu's Princess Theater with his rendition of "Stars and Stripes Forever".

== Contributions ==
Kalima was the first person known to have strung his tenor with a low G, rather than the standard re-entrant tuning. Kalima popularized the use of the tenor size ukulele and was one of the first to use an amplifier with his instrument.

Jesse worked for the Shell Oil Company and in 1940 he married Dorothy Louise Routh Halouska. In addition to performing on a regular basis, he ran a small store where he sold ukuleles under his name and gave lessons. Jesse Kalima died on July 13, 1980.

The Hawaii House of Representatives passed a House Resolution in 1981 honoring his memory and artistic achievements.

Kalima was inducted into the Hawaiian Music Hall of Fame in 2007.

== Discography ==
- Holiday in Hawaii: Luau Time, LP, Sounds of Hawaii
- Jess Uke, LP, Sounds of Hawaii
- Jesse Kalima and Sons, LP
- Nanakuli Ea, flip side Richard Boone's Slack Key, single
- Dark Eyes, single
- Gone With the Wind, single
- Only Ashes Remain, single

== Other Credits ==
- Kona Coast, movie, musical score
- Mark Waters Story, documentary, musical score
