= Kaulana Nā Pua =

Hawaiian patriotic song

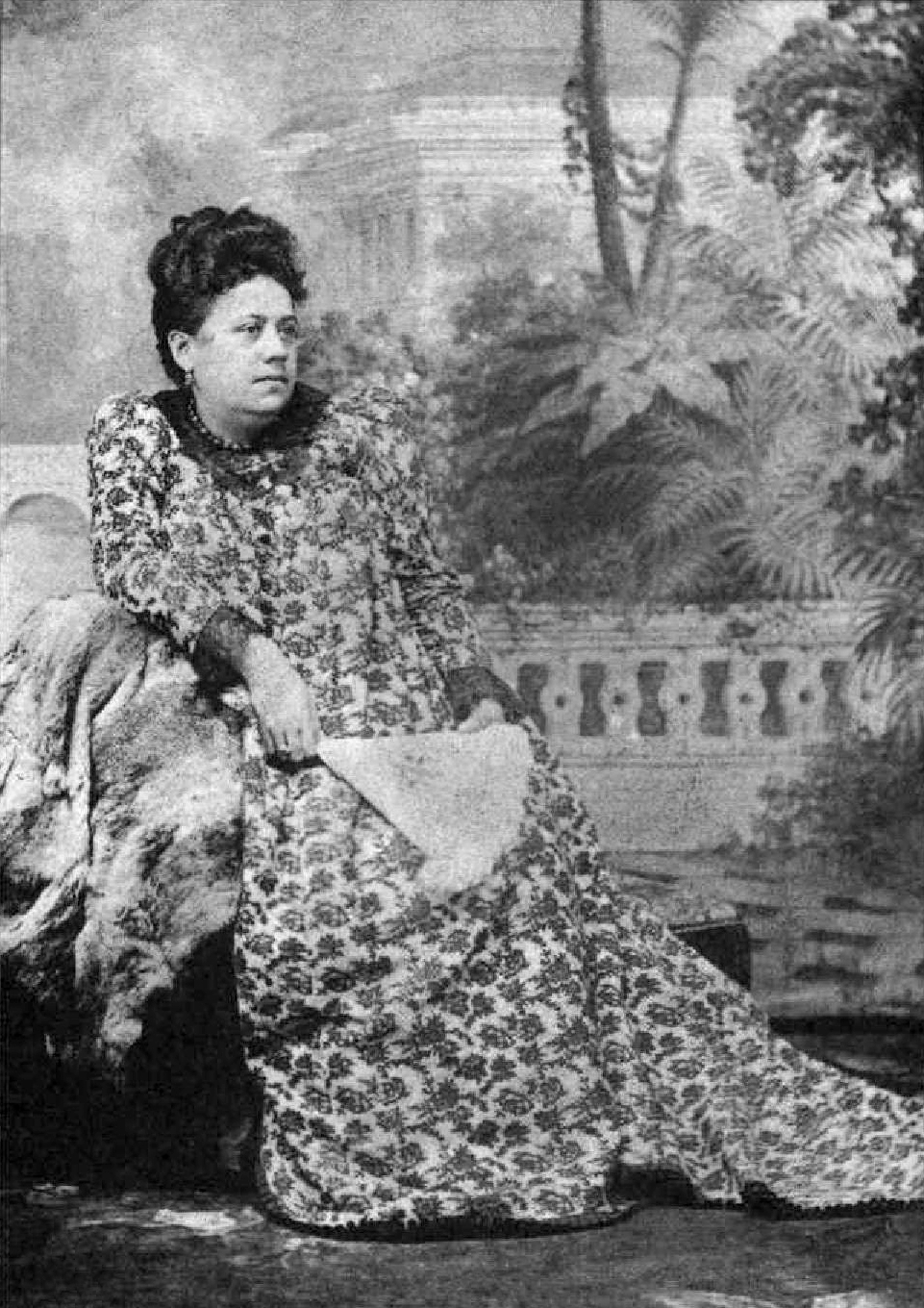
Ellen Kehoʻohiwaokalani Wright Prendergast wrote Kaulana Nā Pua in 1893 for members of the Royal Hawaiian Band.

"Kaulana Nā Pua" ("Famous Are the Flowers") is a Hawaiian patriotic song written by Ellen Kehoʻohiwaokalani Wright Prendergast in 1893 for members of the Royal Hawaiian Band who protested the overthrow of Queen Liliʻuokalani and the Hawaiian Kingdom. The song is also known under the titles of "Mele ʻAi Pōhaku" ("Stone-Eating Song") or "Mele Aloha ʻĀina" ("Patriot's Song"). It is still popular in Hawaii today, although it is not clear how many non-Hawaiian speaking listeners are aware of the song's historical significance or the profound antipathy to U.S. annexation in its lyrics.

According to Elbert and Mahoe (1970), "The song was considered sacred and not for dancing." However, today hālau hula perform "Kaulana Nā Pua" as a hula ʻauana for makuahine (a graceful dance for mature women).

Hawaiian original

Kaulana nā pua aʻo Hawaiʻi
Kūpaʻa mahope o ka ʻāina
Hiki mai ka ʻelele o ka loko ʻino
Palapala ʻānunu me ka pākaha

Pane mai Hawaiʻi moku o Keawe
Kōkua nā Hono aʻo Piʻilani
Kākoʻo mai Kauaʻi o Mano
Paʻapū me ke one Kākuhihewa

ʻAʻole aʻe kau i ka pūlima
Maluna o ka pepa o ka ʻenemi
Hoʻohui ʻāina kūʻai hewa
I ka pono siwila aʻo ke kanaka

ʻAʻole mākou aʻe minamina
I ka puʻukālā a ke aupuni
Ua lawa mākou i ka pōhaku
I ka ʻai kamahaʻo o ka ʻāina

Mahope mākou o Liliʻulani
A loaʻa e ka pono o ka ʻāina (Note: Also sung as "A kau hou ʻia e ke kalaunu." ("She will be crowned again."))
Haʻina ʻia mai ana ka puana
Ka poʻe i aloha i ka ʻāina

English translation

Famous are the children of Hawaii
Ever loyal to the land
When the evil messenger comes
With his greedy document of extortion.

Hawaii, the land of Keawe answers,
The bays of Piʻilani help.
Kauaʻi of Mano lends support,
All are united by sands of Kākuhihewa.

Fix not a signature
To the paper of the enemy.
With its sin of annexation
And sale of the people's civil rights.

We value not
The government's hills of money,
We're satisfied with the rocks
The wondrous food of the land.

We support Liliʻuokalani
Who has won the rights of the land.
The story is told
of the people who love the land.

The "government" referred to in the song is the Provisional Government of Hawaii (which was later to become the Republic of Hawaii and subsequently the territory and state), proclaimed by the conspirators upon seizing power. Mrs. Prendergast composed the song for the Royal Hawaiian Band, who:

... had just walked out on their jobs after the bandmaster demanded they sign an oath of loyalty to the Provisional Government. The bandmaster said they had to sign or they would be eating rocks. It is obvious that they meant it was not right to sell one's loyalty to their country for money. If we hold on to the land, the land will always feed us. ... [L]and endures.

—Noenoe Silva, assistant professor in political science, University of Hawaiʻi at Mānoa, in Honolulu Weekly.

The Hawaiian Renaissance has lent the song "Kaulana Nā Pua" renewed significance in recent years. Its words are often cited in the context of the Hawaiian sovereignty movement as an expression of opposition to U.S. rule.
