= Charles E. King =

Hawaiian-born American musician (1874–1950)

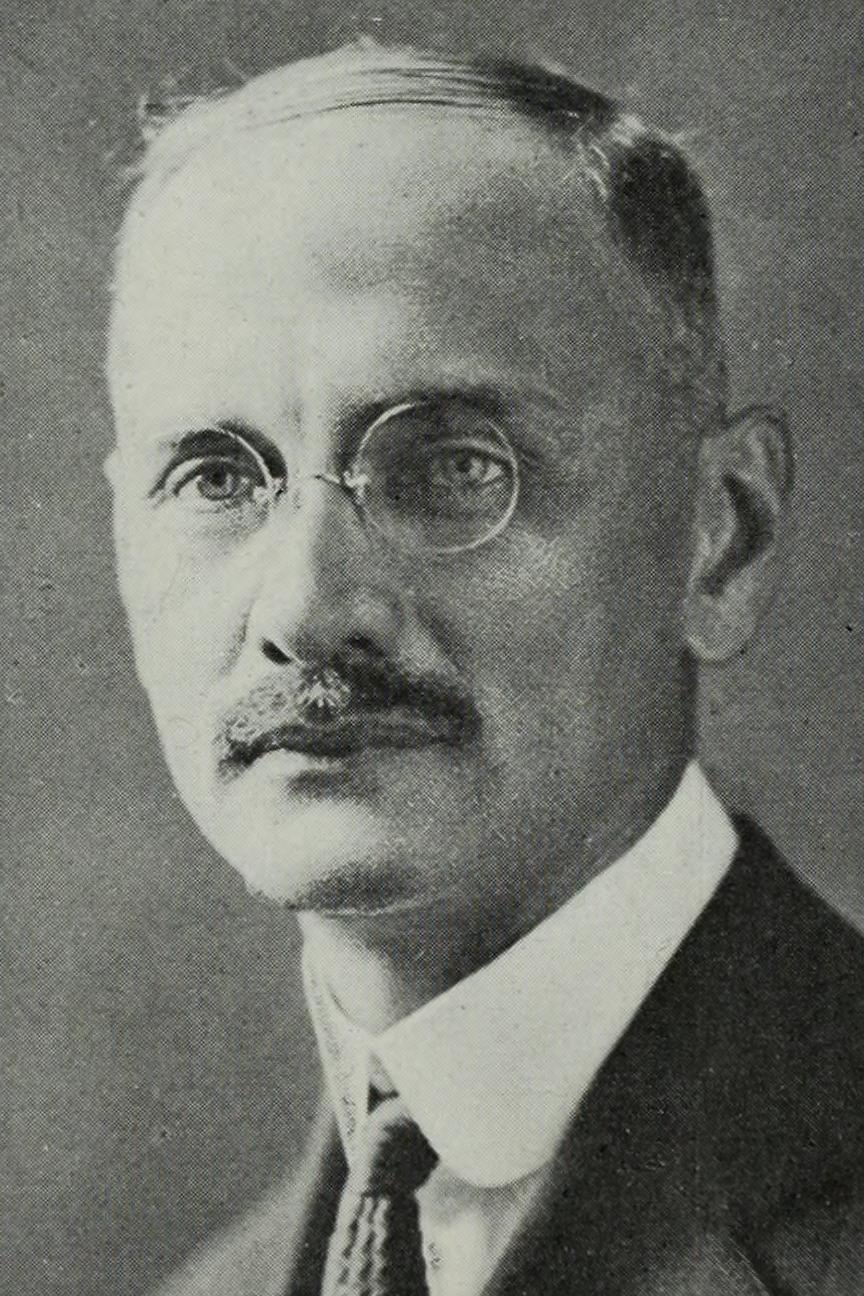
- King before 1921

Background information
- Born: Charles Edward King; January 29, 1874; Honolulu, Kingdom of Hawaii
- Died: February 27, 1950 (aged 76) United States
- Occupations: Songwriter, composer, legislator, educator
- Formerly of: Royal Hawaiian Band

Charles Edward King (January 29, 1874 – February 27, 1950) was a Hawaiian-born American educator, Hawaii territorial legislator, and a songwriter who is most widely known as the composer of "Ke Kali Nei Au". King was inducted into the Hawaiian Music Hall of Fame in 1995. Music historian George Kanahele regarded King as the "Dean of Hawaiian Music", although this sobriquet is more associated with John Kameaaloha Almeida.

== Teaching and legislative career ==
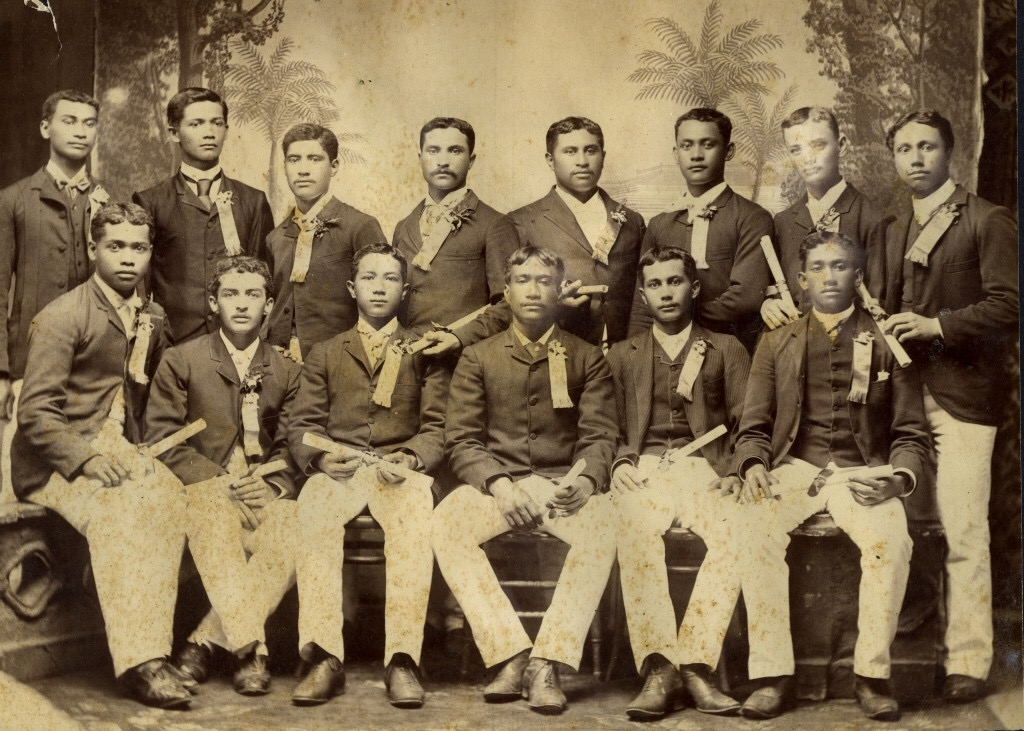
Charles E. King (standing second from right) with the first graduating class of the Kamehameha School for Boys, 1891

Charles E. King was born of part Hawaiian ancestry, at the Nuʻuanu Valley estate of Queen Emma of Hawaii, in Honolulu, to Walter and Mary Ann Brash. He was adopted by his maternal grandfather John Lewis King after the death of his mother, and was christened by his godmother Queen Emma at St. Andrew's Cathedral. King was educated in public schools in Hawaii and the Kamehameha School for Boys. Following his 1891 graduation from Kamehameha School, Charles Reed Bishop, husband of Bernice Pauahi Bishop, paid his tuition at Oswego Primary Teachers Training School in New York. He returned to Hawaii, teaching music in the Kailua-Kona school district, and also at Kamehameha School for Boys. In 1914, Kamehameha alumni circulated a petition requesting that King be named school principal, but Ernest C. Webster was chosen instead.

When Bishop Estate trustee Samuel Mills Damon resigned in 1916, the trustees named former teacher William Williamson, a white man, to fill the vacancy. As established by the original trust deed, any trustee appointment had to be approved by the Supreme Court of the Hawaiian Islands. With his post-teaching success in business, Williamson's nomination easily received that approval. The nomination ran into trouble with Judge C. W. Ashford of the probate court that was charged with overseeing trusts. Ashford decreed that the slot should be filled by someone of Hawaiian ancestry, and therefore representative of the very people for whom the trust was established. He appointed alumnus King, who had spoken openly about his concerns that the school was under-performing academically and not adequately preparing its graduates for career or economic success. Ashford's appointment of King was overturned on appeal in the ninth circuit court, which ruled in favor of the original Williamson appointment having been in strict accordance with the trust deed.

After considering a run for various elected offices in 1917, King successfully ran on the Republican ticket in 1918 for a seat in the Territory of Hawaii senate. The College of Agriculture and Mechanic Arts of the Territory of Hawaii was authorized by the legislature in 1907 and first began operating in 1908 on Young Street in Honolulu. The institution's name was changed in 1911 to College of Hawaii and relocated to the Manoa valley. A community need to expand the school's curriculum and offer university-level degrees, led to King's introducing Senate Bill 76 in 1919, creating the legislation to establish the University of Hawaii at Manoa. While still serving in the legislature, he also led campus song concerts at the university.

== Music career ==
He grew up surrounded by traditional Hawaiian mele style of music and was a musical protégé of Liliuokalani. King began pursuing songwriting sometime in mid-life, publishing the first two of his three books of sheet music when he was 42 years old.

"Kamehameha Waltz" was penned by King as a paean to his alma mater and to Bernice Pauahi Bishop who created the trust fund that established the school, "Majestic stands Kamehameha/My home of education"..."For you, O great Pauahi, high chiefess/Our exclamations of joy". The song was performed in 1914 by the King Glee Club as part of The Woods of Hawaii musical presentation at the Honolulu Opera House, sponsored by the Christian youth organization Young People's League. It was first recorded on May 18, 1928 by the Charles E. King Male Chorus on the Columbia Records label. Since then, it has become a standard at the school's annual song contest.

His compositions were favored by Hawaiian lap steel guitarist Sol Hoʻopiʻi who, along with Glenwood Leslie and Lani McIntyre as Sol Hoopii's Novelty Trio, recorded 17 of King's songs from 1927–1931.

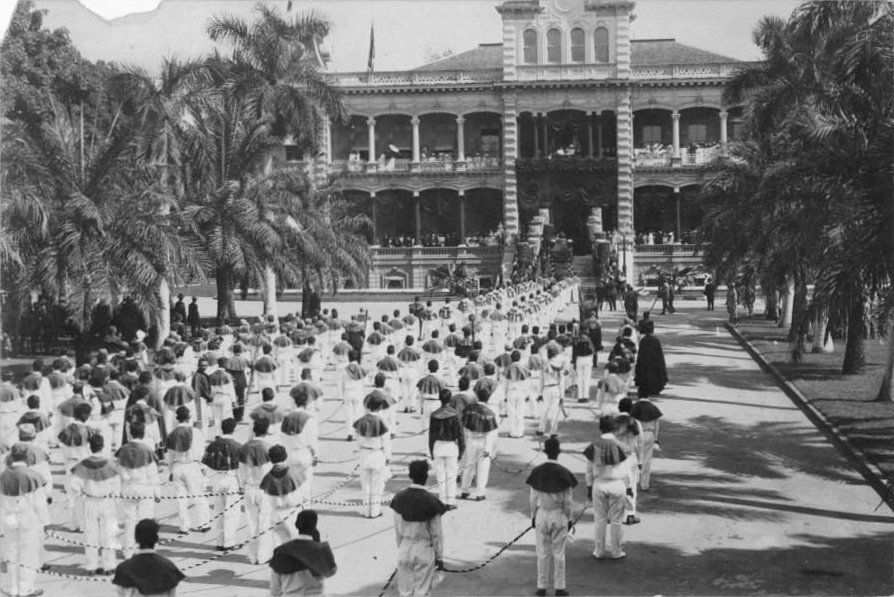
Catafalque of Liliuokalani being carried out of ʻIolani Palace

The most famous song associated with King, "Ke Kali Nei Au" (Waiting For Thee), is known to today's audiences as the Hawaiian Wedding Song. Recorded by numerous modern-day artists, King's original lyrics are not the same as the 1958 translation by Al Hoffman and Dick Manning. King's version was not a wedding song but one of several tunes written for his Hawaiian-language opera The Prince of Hawaii. At its May 4, 1925 premiere, Ray Kinney starred in the lead of Prince Kauikalu, with Rose Tribe as Queen Kamaka, and Joseph Kamakau as King Kalani. The production toured the mainland United States with King in 1926. "Ke Kali Nei Au" was first recorded in Honolulu on May 22, 1928 on the Columbia Records label as a duet with Helen Desha Beamer and Sam Kapu Sr. accompanied by the Don Barrientos Hawaiia n Orchestra.

At the 1917 state funeral of his musical mentor Liliuokalani, King led the Young People's League in singing her composition "Aloha ʻOe" on the balcony of ʻIolani Palace as her catafalque was carried out to take her casket for entombment in the Kalākaua Crypt of the Royal Mausoleum of Mauna ʻAla.

He served as conductor of the Royal Hawaiian Band for two non-sequential periods, 1932–1934 and 1939–1941.

== Personal life ==
In 1911, King's wife Jean Bates died of cancer and was buried at Kawaiahaʻo Church cemetery.

Through his musical work with the Young People's League, he became acquainted with Emma Liftee of Kona. The couple was married by Rev. Akaiko Akana on July 26, 1915.

When the United States entered World War II, King relocated to Elmhurst, New York, with his last wife Regina P. Hughes and began pursuing his music publishing interests. He died on February 27, 1950.

== Publications ==
- King's Book of Hawaiian Melodies (in Hawaiian and English). 1915. LCCN unk84134220.
- Song of the Islands, as sung in "The Woods of Hawaii". 1915. LCCN unk84214415.
- Na lei o Hawaii; ukulele solo. 1916. LCCN unk84212590.
- Songs of Honolulu. 1917. LCCN unk84112974.
- The Latest Hawaiian Hulas. 1917. LCCN unk84129393.
- The Prince of Hawaii. 1925. LCCN unk84074733.
- Favorites from The Prince of Hawaii. 1926. LCCN unk84070988.
- King's Songs of Hawaii: a companion to King's Book of Hawaiian Melodies (in Hawaiian and English). 1942. LCCN 43011014.
- Hawaiian favorites, for the piano. 1945. LCCN unk84202781.
- Ke kali nei au. The Hawaiian wedding song: Hawaiian lyric and music by Charles E. King. English lyric by Al Hoffman [and] Dick Manning. 1958. LCCN unk84211379.

== Compositions ==
Partial listing. Sources: DAHR, UC Santa Barbara and huapala.org

- "Aloha Oe E Kuu Lei"
- "An Island Serenade"
- "Elue, Mikimiki"
- "Hawaii"
- "Hawaiʻi Kuʻu Home"
- "Hawaii Nei"
- "Hawaiian Mother's Lullaby" (co-wrote with Frances H. Gerber)
- "He Nohea Oe I Kuu Maka"
- "He Olu Ia No'u"
- "Hi‘ipoe Like I Ke Aloha"
- "Honolulu Maids"
- "Honolulu, You're the Home of the Moon"
- "Hoʻokahi No Pua Lawa Kuʻu Lei"
- "Hoohihi Oe Ke Ike Mai"
- "Huehue"
- "Imi Au Ia Oe" (from The Prince of Hawaii)
- "Imua Kamehameha" (from The Prince of Hawaii)
- "Kaala"
- "Ka ʻAnoʻi"
- "Ka Ipo Poina Ole"
- "Ka Hana Ia A Ke Aloha"
- "Kaimana Hila"
- "Kalena Kai" (Liholiho chant set to music by King)
- "Kamaile Waltz"
- "Kamehameha March"
- "Kamehameha Waltz"
- "Ka Ulua"
- "Ke Kali Nei Au" (from The Prince of Hawaii)
- "King's Serenade"
- "Ku‘u ‘I‘ini"
- "Kuu Leialoha"
- "Kuʻu Lei Lehua"
- "Kuu Lei Mokihana" (from The Prince of Hawaii)
- "Kuu Lei Pikake"
- "Lehua"
- "Lei Aloha Lei Makamae"
- "Lei Gardenia"
- "Lei Ilima"
- "Leilani"
- "Leilehua" (from The Prince of Hawaii)
- "Leilehua-ahula"
- "Lei Leihua O Pana ʻewa"
- "Lei Lokelani"
- "Maile Laulii"
- "Mai Nuha Mai ʻOe "
- "Maui Ka' Oeoe"
- "Mauna Loa"
- "May Day is Lei Day Too"
- "Mi Nei"
- "Momi O Ka Pākīpika"
- "My Dear Hawaiʻi"
- "Na Lei O Hawaii" (aka "Song of the Islands" from The Prince of Hawaii)
- "Na Moku O Hawai`i"
- "Neʻeneʻe Mai A Pili"
- "Nênê Hanu `A`ala" (co-wrote with Mary Jane Montan)
- "O Oe Ka'u"
- "Paahau Waltz"
- "Pa`au`au Hula" (co-wrote with John U. Iosepa) (Note: "This song was dedicated to Hon. John F. Colburn, cousin of Lahilahi Webb, whose home was called Pa`au`au in remembrance of the pool in Ewa.""Pa'au'au Hula". huapala.org.)
- "Pehea Ho`i Au"
- "Palolo"
- "Pauoa Liko Lehua"
- "Pidgin English Hula"
- "Pô Mahina"
- "Pua Onaona"
- "Pua Roselani" (from The Prince of Hawaii)
- "Pulupe Nei Ili"
- "Uheuhene"
- "Wahiikaahuula" (co-wrote with Ruth Lilikalani)
