= Johnny Noble =

American musician, composer and arranger

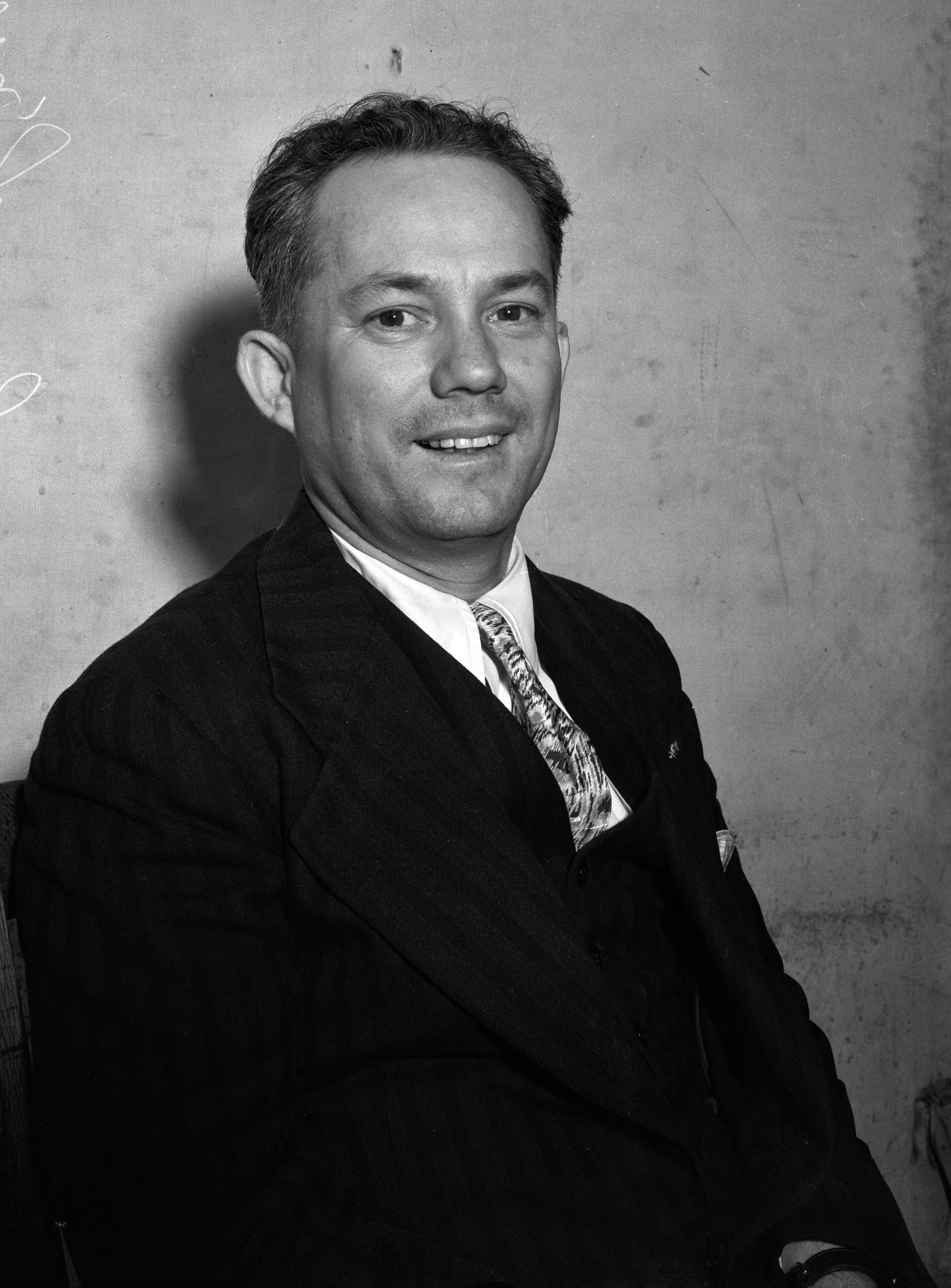
- Noble in 1932

Background information
- Born: John Avery Noble; September 17, 1892; Honolulu, Hawaii
- Died: January 13, 1944 (aged 51) Honolulu, Hawaii
- Genre: Hawaiian music
- Occupations: Musician, composer, arranger
- Instruments: drums, xylophone, piano
- Years active: 1913–1944
- Label: Brunswick

John Avery Noble (September 17, 1892 – January 13, 1944) was an American musician, composer and arranger. He was one of the key figures behind the development of the hapa haole style of music in Honolulu, and played a leading role in introducing Hawaiian music to the United States.

== Early life ==
Johnny Noble was born in Honolulu, Hawaii on September 17, 1892. He was exposed to music from an early age, listening to band concerts on Sunday afternoons in Kapiolani Park, and traditional singing in local churches. He attended Kaiulani School, and in his spare time sold newspapers on the streets of Honolulu and entertained passers-by whistling popular tunes. His high school education was at Saint Louis School, where he learned to play drums, piano and guitar. He graduated from school in 1911 and went to work at the Mutual Telephone Company in Honolulu, where he continued working long after he became a successful musician. He was of hapa haole or European and Native Hawaiian descent.

== Career ==
In 1917, Noble was hired by Ernest Ka'ai who was musical director at many Honolulu hotels. Noble worked part-time as a drummer and whistler for Ka'ai at several theaters before meeting Sonny Cunha, a well known Honolulu musician. Cunha was born in 1879, also in Honolulu, and developed the hapa haole (half-Hawaiian) sound in 1900 by mixing traditional Hawaiian music and American ragtime. In 1918 Noble became a member of Cunha's band playing drums and xylophone, and soon was well acquainted with the hapa haole. Cunha was Noble's mentor and, among other things, taught Noble composition. Noble adopted Cunha's music to blend jazz and blues with Hawaiian music to produce a new style of hapa haole. While conservatives complained that this new music "degrad[ed] and commercializ[ed]" traditional Hawaiian music, it was very popular with audiences in Honolulu.

Noble went on to become an arranger and a band leader. In 1920 he led Honolulu's Moana Hotel orchestra, introducing his new music to the band's repertoire. He later ended up supervising most of Honolulu's hotels and country club entertainment. In 1924 Noble was chosen as Hawaii's delegate at a Music Trade Convention in San Francisco, where he took the opportunity to look for new ideas to incorporate in his music. Over the next few years Noble and his band publicized Hawaiian music by means of recordings, radio broadcasts, performances on cruise ships and tours of mainland America. Noble played a leading role in introducing and popularizing Hawaiian music in the United States.

Noble composed a number of hapa haole tunes, including "My Little Grass Shack", "King Kamehameha" and "Hula Blues". He also popularized the traditional "Hawaiian War Chant" song. Noble published hundreds of traditional Hawaiian songs in their original form, and reworked many to "Western scale and contemporary instrumentation". He made over 100 recordings, which included 110 songs for Brunswick Records.

== Legacy and death ==
In 1935 Noble was inducted into the American Society of Composers, Authors and Publishers (ASCAP), the first Hawaiian composer to receive this honor. To mark the 25th anniversary of his musical career, Honolulu officially declared April 23, 1938 "Johnny Noble Day".

Noble died at the age of 51 in Honolulu on January 13, 1944, and is buried in Oahu Cemetery.
