= Hawaiʻi Academy of Recording Arts =

American entertainment organization

Hawai‘i Academy of Recording Arts
- Abbreviation: HARA
- Formation: 1978
- Type: Entertainment organization
- Headquarters: Honolulu, Hawai‘i, US
- Location: Homer A. Maxey International Trade ResourceCenter, 521 Ala Moana Boulevard, Suite 429, Honolulu, Hawaiʻi 96813-4934
- Official language: English
- President: Amy Hanaiali'i

The Hawai'i Academy of Recording Arts (HARA) was established in 1978 to stimulate interest in the local recording industry and the music of Hawaii. HARA became a nonprofit organization in 1981. A voluntary, 13 member-elected Board governs the Academy. Each year the academy selects nominees through member ballot, and presents the Nā Hōkū Hanohano Awards ("Stars of Distinction") typically in May (however, due to COVID-19 it will be held September 10, 2020 at the Hawai‘i Convention Center. Both the Academy and the Nā Hōkū Hanohano Awards trace their origins to 1978 and KCCN-AM Radio (now KCCN-FM), then the world’s only all-Hawaiian music radio station.

== Membership ==
The Academy offers three different types of memberships.

Regular Membership is open to all professionals in the Hawai‘i recording industry. Included are resident recording artists, singers, musicians, studio technicians, engineers, producers, songwriters, graphic artists, liner note annotators, and editors (or text editors) with at least one verifiable recording credit. All recordings must have been commercially released in Hawai‘i. Commercially released recordings are defined as being released through distribution companies/outlets and retail Internet distribution outlets located within the State of Hawai’i. Resident recording artists, producers and other professionals with digital download–only releases which are for sale exclusively through established online retailers such as iTunes, Rhapsody, Amazon.com, eMusic and CD Baby are also eligible or regular membership. Artists and other professionals whose recordings are distributed solely via personal sales at performances and/or non-retail Internet Web sites are not eligible for regular membership. Regular members may nominate, vote for and sit on the Board of Governors of HARA, chair committees; vote for all Nā Hōkū Hanohano ballot categories, including the technical categories and are entitled to receive the newsletter.

Associate Membership is open to all members of related industries, including but not limited to: radio, television, retail record outlets, record distributors, record companies, arts and entertainment writers, other members of the media and professional musicians without a recording credit. Associate members may vote for all ballot categories except technical categories; sit on HARA committees; and are entitled to receive the newsletter.

Friend of the Academy Membership is open to anyone who wishes to support HARA and its initiatives. Friends of the Academy are entitled to receive the newsletter. Designed for the non-professional who wishes to support the efforts of HARA.

== Educational mission and scholarships ==
HARA also directs programs to promote quality and growth in the recording and music industries in Hawai‘i. In conjunction with Tropical Music, Inc., Hawai‘i state universities and colleges, the Hawai‘i Academy of Recording Arts awards two scholarships annually to students with a demonstrable interest in the study of Hawaiian music.

The Academy has conducted seminars and panel sessions on the music and recording business with The Recording Academy and the Hawai‘i Island Economic Development Board. In conjunction with the State Department of Business, Economic Development and Tourism (DBEDT) and Hawai‘i book, fashion and food groups, it participates in events and projects promoting Hawai‘i product.

== Lifetime Achievement Awards ==
A separate ceremony for the prestigious Lifetime Achievement Awards honors Hawai‘i recording industry pioneers and veterans, who are also acknowledged during the Nā Hōkū Hanohano Awards live broadcast.

== Board of Governors ==
Nominations and elections for the Board of Governors are held in the fall of each year, with terms beginning at the Academy’s general membership meeting, usually held during the second week of November each year. Governors are elected or appointed to three year terms.
