= Webley Edwards =

American Radio Host/Journalist/Politician (1902-1977)

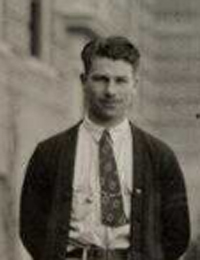
- Born: November 11, 1902; Corvallis, Oregon, U.S.
- Died: October 5, 1977 (aged 74); Honolulu, Hawaii, U.S.
- Education: Oregon State University
- Occupations: National radio host, politician, WWII news correspondent
- Years active: 1935–1968

Webley Edwards (November 11, 1902 – October 5, 1977) was one of the leading World War II correspondents for CBS. Before and after WWII, he was a nationally syndicated radio host and, later in life, a Hawaiian state politician.

== Early life and education ==
Edwards was the starting quarterback at Oregon State University for two seasons while also serving as the first student manager of the campus-based state public radio station (KOAC (AM)). Edwards was also an active member in the campus Phi Delta Theta journalism fraternity as a student.

== Career ==
=== Early career ===
In 1928 Edwards relocated to Honolulu, Hawaii where he became an auto salesman and played for the Scotty Schuman's Town semi-professional football team. It was during this time he developed a keen interest in Native Hawaiian musical traditions. In 1935 he became a producer for a radio show which showcased authentic island music. The show, named Hawaii Calls debuted on July 3 of that year. The show struggled financially for the first several years.

=== The war years ===
Edwards provided international radio coverage of Japan's WWII surrender from aboard the USS Missouri.

Edwards was the station manager at KGMB in late 1941. Edwards was the first radio announcer to broadcast the attack on Pearl Harbor by the Japanese. It was he who said on air: "Attention. This is no exercise. The Japanese are attacking Pearl Harbor!....All Army, Navy and Marine personnel to report to duty". After the attack, Edwards worked as Pacific Bureau manager for CBS Radio. Among his most notable experiences was landing the first interview with Colonel Paul Tibbets, the pilot of the Enola Gay which dropped the atomic bomb over Hiroshima. Edwards, of CBS, was one of only two broadcast journalists aboard the USS Missouri during the surrender ceremony at Tokyo Bay on September 2, 1945. He was the "chief announcer" for the ceremony, Merrill Mueller of NBC was the "narrator." Edwards has the distinction of being the only broadcaster to witness the very beginning and end of the United States' involvement in World War II.

=== After the war ===
Edwards returned to radio broadcasting Hawaiian music. Hawaii Calls ran for 37 years. He wrote lyrics (with Leon Pober) to the popular song, "Pearly Shells", recorded by Burl Ives, Don Ho, Billy Vaughn and Hank Snow, to name a few.

Edwards served as a representative in the Legislature of Hawaii from 1952 to 1966 and as a Hawaiian State Senator from 1966 to 1968.

Edwards died of a heart attack in 1977.
