= Hawaii Calls =

20th century American radio show

- Genre: Hawaiian music
- Running time: 30 min
- Country of origin: United States
- Languages: English, Hawaiian
- Starring: Webley Edwards, Hawaiian Musicians and Singers
- Created by: Webley Edwards
- Written by: Webley Edwards
- Directed by: Webley Edwards
- Executive producer: Webley Edwards
- Narrated by: Webley Edwards
- Recording studio: Moana Hotel, Outrigger Reef Waikiki Beach Resort, Ilikai Hotel, Hawaiian Village Hotel, Waikiki, Hawaii
- Original release: July 3, 1935 – August 16, 1975
- No. of episodes: 2083

Hawaii Calls was a radio program broadcast live from Waikiki Beach from 1935 through 1975 that reached 750 stations worldwide at the height of its popularity. It featured live Hawaiian music by an 11-piece dance orchestra conducted by Harry Owens, the composer of "Sweet Leilani". The show selected the best musicians and singers, with the purpose of showcasing what authentic Hawaiian music is like when played by native performers, but with one major difference—the lyrics were sung in English and intended for white audiences. Hawaiians called this hybrid with English hapa haole (half-white).

Hawaii Calls intro by Webley Edwards

The show was first heard in the U.S. mainland over short wave radio, but by 1952 it was carried over station KGMB in Honolulu. The show had no advertisements but, because of its positive portrayal of Hawaii, it received a subsidy for many years—first from the government of the Territory of Hawaii, and then from the State of Hawaii.

It was broadcast each week, usually from the courtyard of the Moana Hotel on Waikiki Beach but occasionally from other locations, and hosted by Webley Edwards for almost the entire run. Al Kealoha Perry was musical director for thirty years, 1937–1967. Ray Andrade was a charter member of the Harry Owens Royal Hawaiian Hotel Orchestra and became one of the first vocalists on the Hawaii Calls radio show. When the show came on the air, listeners were convinced that they could hear sound of waves pounding on the surf. According to historian Lorene Ruymar, they were likely hearing the alternating sound waves on their radio sets; but host Webley Edwards picked up on it, and he began opening every performance by holding the microphone out toward the ocean proclaiming, "The sound of the waves on the beach at Waikiki" over an alluring steel guitar background.

== Legacy ==
Hawaii Calls is credited with making many Hawaiian performers household names across the US and around the world. Among the regulars of the show were Alfred Apaka, John Kameaaloha Almeida, Haunani Kahalewai, Barney Isaacs Jr., Nina Keali'iwahamana, Boyce Rodrigues, Lani Custino, Jules Ah See and Pua Almeida. Other well known Hawaiian performers such as Martin Denny, Hilo Hattie, Ed Kenney, Benny Kalama, hula dancer Beverly Noa and Arthur Lyman also made appearances. The show also occasionally featured performers from other parts of the world who sang or played Hawaiian music. Hawaiian singer Haleloke Kahauolopua from Hilo was a featured vocalist. She was discovered by Arthur Godfrey when he was in Hawaii on vacation in 1950. He brought her to New York and she made recordings with Godfrey playing his ukulele accompanied by the Archie Bleyer Orchestra.

During the height of the show's popularity (1950s and into the early 1970s) Webley Edwards served the role of producer of numerous records, released on the Capitol Records label, under the title of "Webley Edwards presents Hawaii Calls." The albums contained renditions of popular Hawaiian and hapa haole songs as arranged by the Hawaii Calls musicians.

== Latter years ==
When the show went off the air in 1975, only 10 stations were airing it. The termination of the subsidy was one of the reasons that the show went off the air. Several of the "Hawaii Calls" CD releases listed below are still in print and available from Mele.com. There are also several compact disc compilations released by Hula Records, the company that owns the rights to the name Hawaii Calls and the show's surviving archives. They feature also songs from some of the classic radio shows and may include Edwards' colorful commentary.

In 1992, "Hawaii Calls" hosted by Bill Bigelow was revived for a one-year run at the Hilton Hawaiian Village, but it failed to attract enough financial support to continue. A one-night "Hawaii Calls" show that combined live performances and archival audio and video material was presented at the Hawaii Theater in Honolulu, Hawaii on Friday, November 14, 2008. The show was co-produced by Burton White, Artistic Director of the Hawaii Theatre, and Don McDiarmid Jr., Chairman of Hawaii Calls Inc., and President Emeritus of Hula Records. The show included live performances by vocalists Nina Keali'iwahamana and Aaron Sala, hula dancer Kanoe Miller, and the Hawaii Calls Quintet including Sally (Sarah) Kamalani, and also archival performances by Alfred Apaka, Lani Custino, Hilo Hattie, Haunani Kahalewai, Ed Kenny, Charles Kaipo Miller, Beverly Noa, Ponce Ponce and Boyce Rodrigues. Webley Edwards was shown introducing some of the archival performances and audio clips of his voice were used to introduce most of the live performances.

== Listen to ==
- Hawaii Calls (December 29, 1949)

== Discography ==
LPs

- Hawaii Calls, Capitol Records T-470, 1956
- Hawaii Calls At Twilight, Capitol Records T-586, 1957
- Favorite Instrumentals of the Islands, Capitol Records T-715, 1957
- Waikiki, Capitol Records T772, 1957
- Island Paradise, Capitol Records ST-1229, 1957
- Hawaiian Shores, Capitol Records T0904, 1958
- Hula Island Favorites, Capitol Records T-987, 1958
- Fire Goddess, Capitol Records ST-1033, 1959
- Hawaiian Strings, Capitol Records ST-1152, 1959
- Hawaii Calls Greatest Hits, Capitol Records ST-1339, 1960
- Let's Sing With Hawaii Calls, Capitol Records ST-1518, 1961
- Exotic Instrumentals, Capitol Records ST-1409, 1961
- Stars of Hawaii Calls, Capitol Records ST-1627. 1961
- A Merry Hawaiian Christmas, Capitol Records ST-1781, 1961
- Hawaii Calls Show, Capitol Records ST-1699, 1962 (live show recording)
- Romantic Instrumentals, Capitol Records ST-1987, 1964
- Waikiki After Dark, Capitol Records ST-2315, 1965
- Hawaii Today, Capitol Records ST-2449, 1966
- Webley Edwards presents "Hawaii Calls" Alfred Apaka's Greatest Hits, Vol.2, Capitol Records DT-2572, 196?
- Best From the Beach at Waikiki, Capitol Records ST-2573, 1967
- More Hawaii Calls Greatest Hits, Capitol Records ST-2736
- Blue Skies Old Hawaii, Capitol Records ST-2782, release year unknown
- Soft Hawaiian Guitars, Capitol Records ST-2917, release year unknown
- The Hawaii Calls Deluxe 2-LP Set, Capitol Records ST-2182, release year unknown (3-LP set is actually a repackaging of Favorite Instrumentals, Alfred Apaka's album Golden Voice of the Islands and Hawaii Calls Greatest Hits)
- The Best of Hawaii Calls, Capitol Records ST1-141, release year unknown

Compact Discs

- Blue Hawaii Hula Records HCS-924A
- Hawaii's Greatest Hits, Vol. I, Hawaii Calls, Inc. HCS-921A
- Hawaii's Greatest Hits, Vol. 2, Hawaii Calls, Inc. HCS-922A
- Hawaiian Wedding Song, Hawaii Calls, Inc. HCS-923A
- A Merry Hawaiian Christmas, Hawaii Calls, Inc. HCS-925
- Hawaii Calls Greatest Hits, Hawaii Calls, Inc. HCS-927 (the best selections from Hawaii's Greatest Hits Volumes I & II)
- Memories of Hawaii Calls, Hawaii Calls, Inc. HCS-928
- Memories of Hawaii Calls Vol. II, Hawaii Calls, Inc. HCS-930
- The Land of Aloha, Hawaii Calls, Inc. HCS-920
- Hawaii Calls: The All-Time Favorites From the Famous Radio Program, Cema Special Markets CDL-57608, 1991
- Al Kealoha Perry & His Singing Surfriders: Aloha, Hula Hawaiian Style (1996, Hana Ola Records)

== See also ==
- Tiki culture
- Martin Denny
- Arthur Lyman
- Royal Hawaiian Girls Glee Club
