= Fingerstyle guitar =

Playing technique

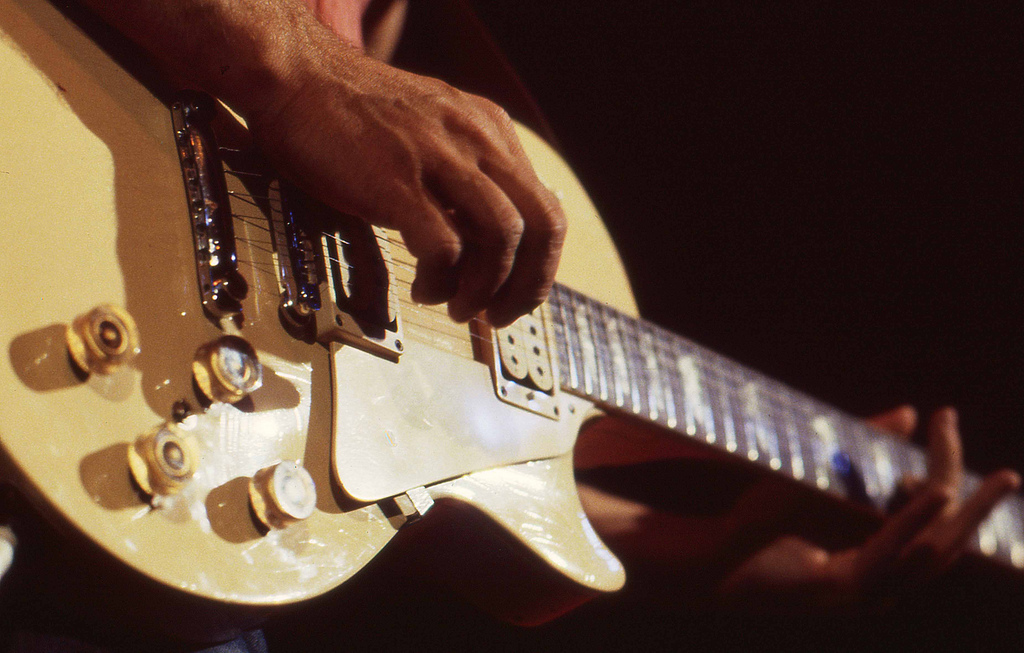
Fingerstyle guitar

Fingerstyle guitar is the technique of playing the guitar or bass guitar by plucking the strings directly with the fingertips, fingernails, or picks attached to fingers, as opposed to flatpicking (plucking individual notes with a single plectrum, commonly called a "pick"). The term "fingerstyle" is something of a misnomer, since it is present in several different genres and styles of music—but mostly, because it involves a completely different technique, not just a "style" of playing, especially for the guitarist's picking/plucking hand. The term is often used synonymously with fingerpicking except in classical guitar circles, although fingerpicking can also refer to a specific tradition of folk, blues and country guitar playing in the US. The terms "fingerstyle" and "fingerpicking" are also applied to similar string instruments such as the banjo.

Music arranged for fingerstyle playing can include chords, arpeggios (the notes that compose a chord sounded individually in either a progressive rising or descending order) and other elements such as artificial harmonics, hammering on and pulling off notes with the fretting hand, using the body of the guitar percussively (by tapping rhythms on the body), and many other techniques. Often, the guitarist will play the melody notes, interspersed with the melody's accompanying chords and the deep bassline (or bass notes) simultaneously. Some fingerpicking guitarists also intersperse percussive tapping along with the melody, chords and bassline. Fingerstyle is a standard technique on the classical or nylon string guitar, but is considered more of a specialized technique on steel string guitars. Fingerpicking is less common on electric guitar. The timbre of fingerpicked notes is described as "result[ing] in a more piano-like attack," and less like pizzicato.

== Technique ==
Because individual digits play notes on the guitar rather than the hand working as a single unit (which is the case when a guitarist is holding a single pick), a guitarist playing fingerstyle can perform several musical elements simultaneously. One definition of the technique has been put forward by the Toronto (Canada) Fingerstyle Guitar Association:

Physically, "Fingerstyle" refers to using each of the right hand fingers independently to play the multiple parts of a musical arrangement that would normally be played by several band members. Deep bass notes, harmonic accompaniment (the chord progression), melody, and percussion can all be played simultaneously when playing Fingerstyle.

Many fingerstyle guitarists have adopted a combination of acrylic nails and a thumbpick to improve tone and decrease nail wear and chance of breaking or chipping. Notable guitarists to adopt this hardware are Ani DiFranco, Doyle Dykes, Don Ross, and Richard Smith.

== Advantages and disadvantages ==
- Players do not have to carry a plectrum (thus eliminating the risk of dropping one), but fingernails may need to be maintained at the right length and angles, and kept in good condition if the player has a preference to use the nails of their fingers over the pads of their fingertips.
- It is possible to play multiple non-adjacent strings at exactly the same time, enabling the guitarist to play, for example, a very low bass note and a high treble note simultaneously, or double stops, such as an octave, a fifth, a sixth, or other intervals that suit the harmony.
- It is more suitable for playing polyphonically, with separate, independent musical lines, or separate melody, harmony and bass parts than using a plectrum, and therefore more suitable for unaccompanied solo playing, or small ensembles like duos, in which a guitarist accompanies a singer. Fingerstyle players have up to four (or five) surfaces (fingernails or picks) striking the strings and/or other parts of the guitar independently.
- It is easy to play arpeggios; but the techniques for tremolo (rapid repetition of a note) and melody playing are more complex than with plectrum playing.
- It is possible to play chords without any arpeggiation, because up to five strings can be plucked simultaneously.
- There is less need for fretting hand damping (muting) in playing chords, since only the strings that are required can be plucked.
- A greater variation in strokes is possible, allowing greater expressiveness in timbre and dynamics.
- A wide variety of strums and rasgueados are possible.
- Less energy is generally imparted to strings than with plectrum playing, leading to lower volume when playing acoustically.
- Playing on heavier gauge strings can damage nails: fingerstyle is more suited to nylon strings or lighter gauge steel strings (but this does not apply to fingerpicks, or when the flesh of the fingers is used rather than the nail, as is common with the lute.)

== Nylon string guitar styles ==
Nylon string guitars are most frequently played fingerstyle.

=== Classical guitar fingerstyle ===
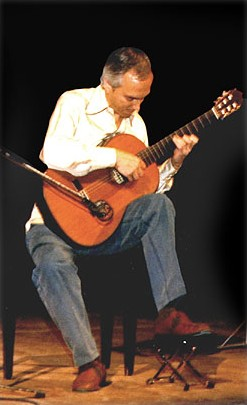
John Williams

The term "Classical guitar" can refer to any kind of art music played fingerstyle on a nylon string guitar, or more narrowly to music of the classical period, as opposed to baroque or romantic music. The major feature of classical-fingerstyle technique is that it enables solo rendition of harmony and polyphonic music in much the same manner as the piano can. The technique is intended to maximize the degree of control over the musical dynamics, texture, articulation and timbral characteristics of the guitar. The sitting position of the player, while somewhat variable, generally places the guitar on the left leg, which is elevated, rather than the right. This sitting position is intended to maintain shoulder alignment and physical balance between the left and right hands. Thumb, index, middle and ring fingers are all commonly employed for plucking, with occasional use of the pinky. Chords are often plucked, with strums being reserved for emphasis. The repertoire varies in terms of keys, modes, rhythms and cultural influences. Classical-guitar music is performed/composed most often in standard tuning (EADGBE). However, altered tunings such as dropped D are common.

==== Notation ====
Fingerings for both hands are often given in detail in classical guitar music notation, although players are also free to add to or depart from them as part of their own interpretation. Fretting hand fingers are given as numbers, plucking hand fingers are given as letters.

| Finger | Notation | Finger | Notation |
|---|---|---|---|
| Thumb | 5 | Thumb | p |
| Index | 1 | Index | i |
| Middle | 2 | Middle | m |
| Ring | 3 | Ring | a |
| Pinky | 4 | Pinky | c, x, e or q |

In guitar scores, the five fingers of the plucking hand are designated by the first letter of their Spanish names, namely p = thumb (pulgar), i = index finger (índice), m = middle finger (medio), a = ring finger (anular), and when used, often c = little finger or pinky (chiquito). (Note: The little finger, whose use is not completely standardized in classical guitar technique, can also be found designated by e, x or q.) There are several words in Spanish for the little finger: most commonly dedo meñique, but also dedo pequeño or dedo auricular; however, their initials conflict with the initials of the other fingers; c is said to be the first half of the initial letter ch of dedo chiquito, which is not the most common name (meñique) for the little finger; the origin of e, x and q is not certain but is said to perhaps be from extremo, Spanish for last or final, for the e and x, and meñique or pequeño for q.

The four fingers of the fretting hand are designated 1 = index, 2 = major, 3 = ring finger, 4 = little finger; 0 designates an open string, that is a string that is not stopped by a finger and whose full length thus vibrates when plucked. On the classical guitar the thumb of the fretting hand is never used to stop strings from above (as is done on the electric guitar): the neck of a classical guitar is too wide and the normal position of the thumb used in classical guitar technique do not make that possible. Scores (contrary to tablatures) do not systematically indicate the string to be plucked (although often the choice is obvious). When an indication of the string is required the strings are designated 1 to 6 (from the 1st the high E to the 6th the low E) with figures 1 to 6 inside circles.

The positions (that is where on the fretboard the first finger of the fretting hand is placed) are also not systematically indicated, but when they are (mostly in the case of the execution of barrés) these are indicated with Roman numerals from the position I (index finger placed on the 1st fret: F–B♭–E♭–A♭–C–F) to the position XII (the index finger placed on the 12th fret: E–A–D–G–B–E; the 12th fret is placed where the body begins) or higher up to position XIX (the classical guitar most often having 19 frets, with the 19th fret being most often split and not being usable to fret the 3rd and 4th strings).

==== Alternation ====
To achieve tremolo effects and rapid, fluent scale passages, and varied arpeggios the player must practice alternation, that is, never plucking a string with the same finger twice. Common alternation patterns include:

- i–m–i–m: Basic melody line on the treble strings. Has the appearance of "walking along the strings".
- a–m–i–a–m–i: Tremolo pattern with a triplet feel (i.e. the same note is repeated three times)
- p–a–m–i–p–a–m–i: Another tremolo pattern.
- p–i–p–i or p–m–p–m: A way of playing a melody line on the lower strings.

==== Tone production ====
Classical guitarists have a large degree of freedom within the mechanics of playing the instrument. Often these decisions influence tone and timbre. Factors include:

- At what position along the string the finger plucks the string (This is changed by guitarists throughout a song, since it is an effective way of changing the sound (timbre) from "soft" (dolce) plucking the string near its middle, to "hard" (ponticelo) plucking the string near its end).
- Use of the nail or not: Modern classical guitar playing uses a technique in which both the nail and the fingertip contact the string during normal playing. (Andrés Segovia is often credited with popularizing this technique.) Playing with either fingertips alone (dita punta) or fingernails alone (dita unghis) are considered special techniques for timbral variation.

Concert guitarists must keep their fingernails smoothly filed and carefully shaped to employ this technique, which produces a better-controlled sound than either nails or fingertips alone. Playing parameters include:

- Which finger to use
- What angle of attack to hold the wrist and fingers at with respect to the strings.
- Rest-stroke apoyando; the finger that plucks a string rests on the next string—traditionally used in single melody lines—versus free-stroke tirando (plucking the string without coming to a rest on the next string).

=== Flamenco guitar fingerstyle ===
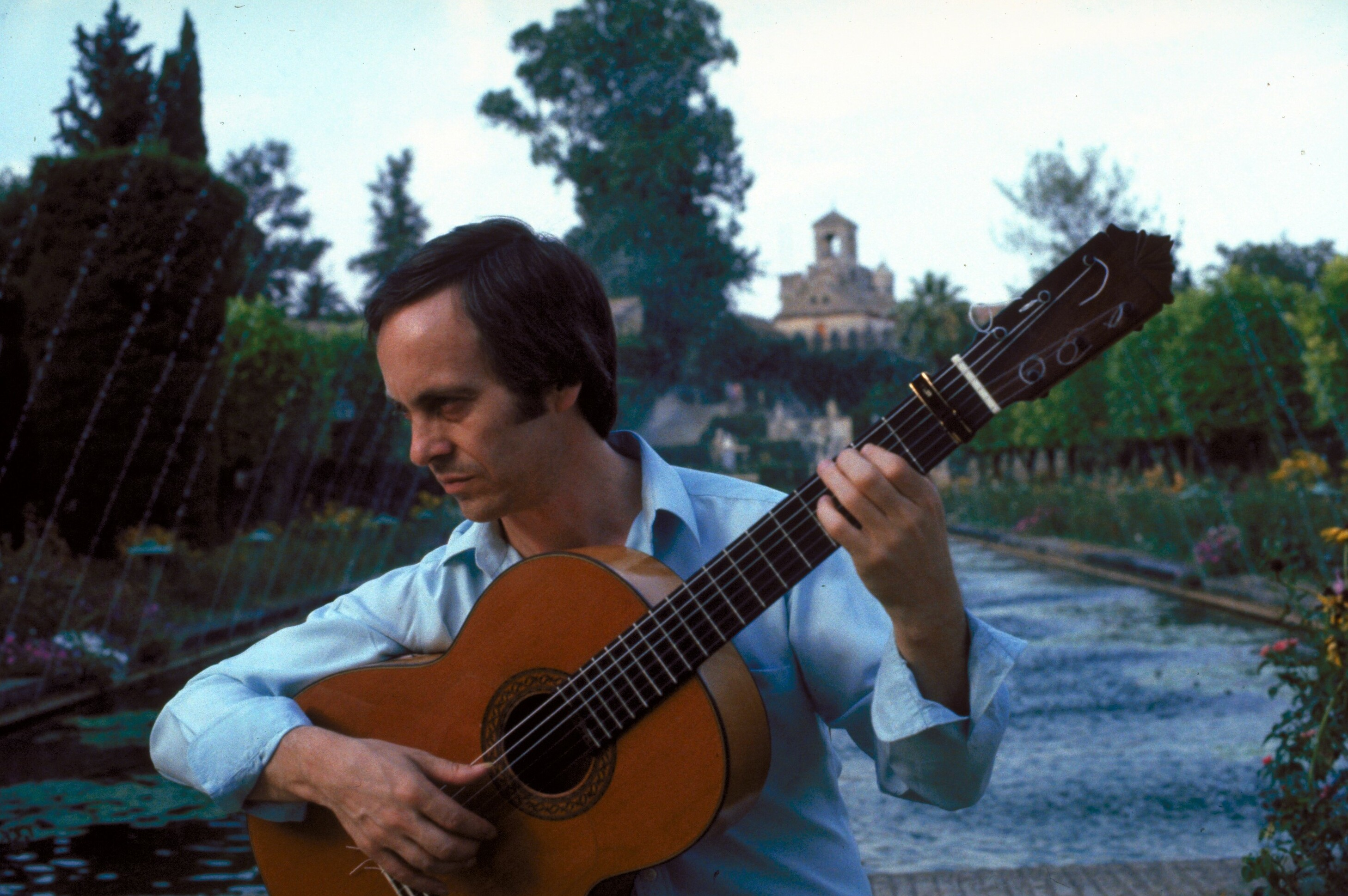
Paco Peña

Flamenco technique is related to classical technique, but with more emphasis on rhythmic drive and volume, and less on dynamic contrast and tone production. Flamenco guitarists prefer keys such as A and E that allow the use of open strings, and typically employ capos where a departure is required.

Some specialized techniques include:

- Picado: Single-line scale passages performed apoyando but with more attack and articulation.
- Rasgueado: Strumming frequently done by bunching all the right hand fingers and then flicking them out in quick succession to get four superimposed strums (although there are a great many variations on this). The rasgueado or "rolling" strum is particularly characteristic of the genre.
- Alzapua: A thumb technique with roots in oud plectrum technique. The right hand thumb is used for both single-line notes and strummed across a number of strings. Both are combined in quick succession to give it a unique sound.
- Tremolo: Done somewhat differently from the conventional classical guitar tremolo, it is very commonly played with the right hand pattern p–i–a–m–i.

=== Bossa nova ===
Basic bossa nova accompaniment pattern

Bossa nova is most commonly performed on the nylon-string classical guitar, played with the fingers rather than with a pick. Its purest form could be considered unaccompanied guitar with vocals, as exemplified by João Gilberto. Even in larger, jazz-like arrangements for groups, there is almost always a guitar that plays the underlying rhythm. Gilberto basically took one of the several rhythmic layers from a samba ensemble, specifically the tamborim, and applied it to the picking hand.

== North American tradition ==
=== Country blues ===
Fingerpicking (also called thumb picking, alternating bass, or pattern picking) is both a playing style and a genre of music. It falls under the "fingerstyle" heading because it is plucked by the fingers, but it is generally used to play a specific type of folk, country-jazz and/or blues music. In this technique, the thumb maintains a steady rhythm, usually playing "ostinato bass" or "alternating bass" patterns on the lower three strings, while the index, or index and middle fingers pick out melody and fill-in notes on the high strings. The style originated in the late 19th and early 20th centuries, as southern blues guitarists tried to imitate the popular ragtime piano music of the day, with the guitarist's thumb functioning as the pianist's left hand, and the other fingers functioning as the right hand. The first recorded examples were by players such as Blind Blake, Big Bill Broonzy, Skip James, Blind Willie McTell, Memphis Minnie and Mississippi John Hurt. Some early blues players such as Blind Willie Johnson and Tampa Red added slide guitar techniques.

=== American primitive guitar ===
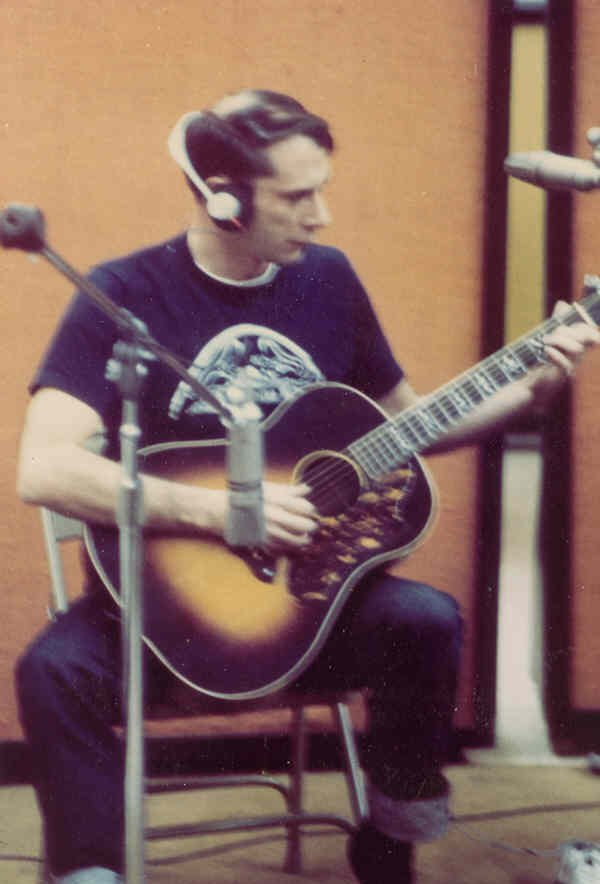
John Fahey

American primitive guitar is a subset of fingerstyle guitar. It originated with John Fahey, whose recordings from the late 1950s to the mid-1960s inspired many guitarists such as Leo Kottke, who made his debut recording of 6- and 12-String Guitar on Fahey's Takoma label in 1969. American primitive guitar can be characterized by the use of folk music or folk-like material, driving alternating-bass fingerpicking with a good deal of ostinato patterns, and the use of alternative tunings (scordatura) such as open D, open G, drop D and open C. The application or "cross-contamination" of traditional forms of music within the style of American primitive guitar is also very common. Examples of traditions that John Fahey and Robbie Basho would employ in their compositions include, but are not limited to, the extended Raga of Indian classical music, the Japanese Koto, and the early ragtime-based country blues music of Mississippi John Hurt or Blind Blake.

=== Country music ===
Fingerpicking was soon taken up by country and western artists such as Sam McGee, Ike Everly (father of the Everly Brothers), Merle Travis, and "Thumbs" Carllile. Later Chet Atkins further developed the style and in modern music musicians such as Jose Gonzalez, Eddie Vedder (on his song "Guaranteed") and David Knowles have utilized the style. Most fingerpickers use acoustic guitars, but some, including Merle Travis played on hollow-body electric guitars, while some modern rock musicians, such as Derek Trucks and Mark Knopfler, employ traditional North American fingerpicking techniques on solid-body electric guitars such as the Gibson Les Paul or the Fender Stratocaster.

=== Ragtime guitar ===
An early master of ragtime guitar was Blind Blake, a popular recording artist of the late 1920s and early 1930s. In the 1960s, a new generation of guitarists returned to these roots and began to transcribe piano tunes for solo guitar. One of the best known and most talented of these players was Dave Van Ronk, who arranged St. Louis Tickle for solo guitar. In 1971, guitarists David Laibman and Eric Schoenberg arranged and recorded Scott Joplin rags and other complex piano arrangements for the LP The New Ragtime Guitar on Folkways Records. This was followed by a Stefan Grossman method book with the same title. A year later Grossman and ED Denson founded Kicking Mule Records, a company that recorded scores of LPs of solo ragtime guitar by artists including Grossman, Ton van Bergeyk, Leo Wijnkamp, Duck Baker, Peter Finger, Lasse Johansson, Tom Ball and Dale Miller. Meanwhile, Reverend Gary Davis was active in New York City, where he mentored many aspiring finger-pickers. He has subsequently influenced numerous other artists in the United States and internationally.

=== Carter Family picking ===
Carter Family picking, also known as "'thumb brush' technique or the 'Carter lick,' and also the 'church lick' and the 'Carter scratch'", is a style of fingerstyle guitar named for Maybelle Carter of the Carter Family's distinctive style of rhythm guitar in which the melody is played on the bass strings, usually low E, A, and D while rhythm strumming continues above, on the treble strings, G, B, and high E. This often occurs during the break.

=== Travis picking ===
Travis picking derives its name from Merle Travis. The foundation of Travis picking revolves around the combination of alternate-bass fingerpicking and syncopated melodies.

This style is commonly played on steel-string acoustic guitars. Pattern picking is the use of "preset right-hand pattern[s]" while fingerpicking, with the left hand fingering standard chords. The most common pattern, sometimes broadly referred to as Travis picking after Merle Travis, and popularized by Chet Atkins, Scotty Moore, James Burton, Marcel Dadi, James Taylor, John Prine, Colter Wall, and Tommy Emmanuel, is:

Middle | X     X       - | X     X       - |
Index  |   X       X   - |   X       X   - |
Thumb  | X   X   X   X - | X   X   X   X - |

The thumb (T) alternates between bass notes, often on two different strings, while the index (I) and middle (M) fingers alternate between two treble notes, usually on two different strings, most often the second and first. Using this pattern on a C major chord is as follows in notation and tablature:

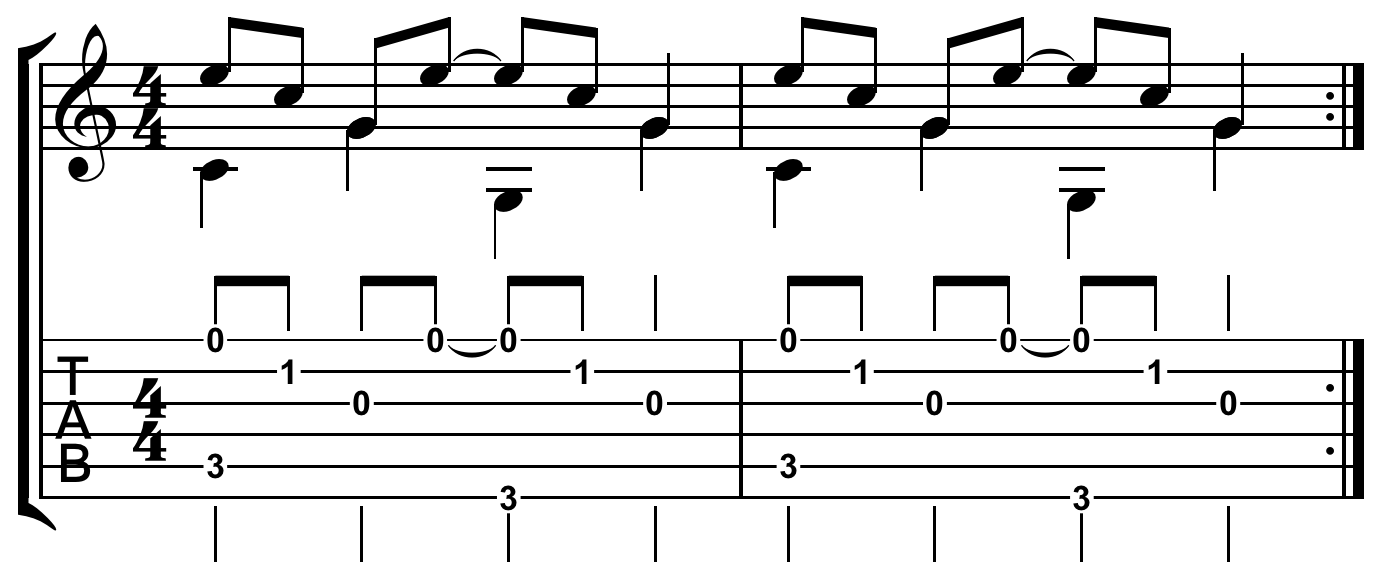
Travis picking.

However, Travis's own playing was often much more complicated than this example. He often referred to his style of playing as "thumb picking", possibly because the only pick he used when playing was a banjo thumb pick, or "Muhlenberg picking", after his native Muhlenberg County, Kentucky, where he learned this approach to playing from Mose Rager and Ike Everly. Travis's style did not involve a defined, alternating-bass string pattern; it was more of an alternating "bass strum" pattern, resulting in an accompanying rhythm reminiscent of ragtime piano.

=== Clawhammer and frailing ===
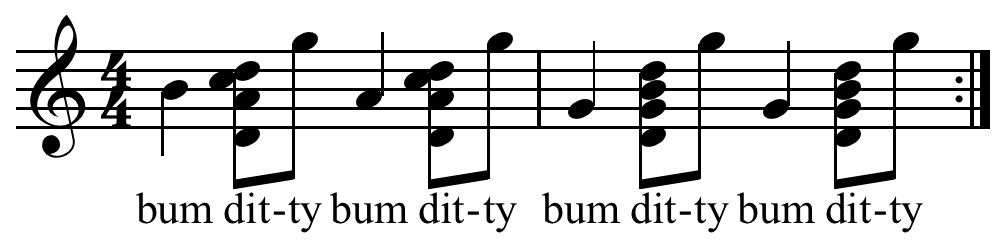
Clawhammer bum-ditty.

Clawhammer and frailing are primarily banjo techniques that are sometimes applied to the guitar. Jody Stecher and Alec Stone Sweet are exponents of guitar clawhammer. Fingerstyle guitarist Steve Baughman distinguishes between frailing and clawhammer as follows. In frailing, the index fingertip is used for up-picking melody, and the middle fingernail is used for rhythmic downward brushing. In clawhammer, only downstrokes are used, and they are typically played with one fingernail as is the usual technique on the banjo.

== Other acoustic styles ==
=== UK Folk baroque ===
A distinctive style to emerge from Britain in the early 1960s, which combined elements of American folk, blues, jazz, and ragtime with British traditional music, was what became known as "folk baroque". Pioneered by musicians of the Second British folk revival began their careers in the short-lived skiffle craze of the later 1950s and often used American blues, folk, and jazz styles, occasionally using open D and G tunings. However, performers like Davy Graham and Martin Carthy attempted to apply these styles to the playing of traditional English modal music. They were soon followed by artists such as Bert Jansch and John Renbourn, who further defined the style. The style these artists developed was particularly notable for the adoption of D–A–D–G–A–D (from lowest to highest), which gave a form of suspended-fourth D chord, neither major nor minor, which could be employed as the basis for modal based folk songs. This was combined with a fingerstyle based on Travis picking and a focus on melody, that made it suitable as an accompaniment. Denselow, who coined the phrase folk baroque, singled out Graham's recording of traditional English folk song "Seven Gypsys" on Folk, Blues and Beyond (1964) as the beginning of the style. Graham mixed this with Indian, African, American, Celtic, and modern and traditional American influences, while Carthy, in particular, used the tuning to replicate the drone common in medieval and folk music played by the thumb on the two lowest strings. The style was further developed by Jansch, who brought a more forceful style of picking, and indirectly, influences from jazz and ragtime, leading particularly to more complex basslines. Renbourn built on all these trends and was the artist whose repertoire was most influenced by medieval music.

In the early 1970s, the next generation of British artists added new tunings and techniques, reflected in the work of artists such as Nick Drake, Tim Buckley, and particularly John Martyn, whose Solid Air (1972) set the bar for subsequent British acoustic guitarists. Perhaps the most prominent exponent of recent years has been Martin Simpson, whose complex mix of traditional English and American material, together with innovative arrangements and techniques like the use of guitar slides, represents a deliberate attempt to create a unique and personal style. Martin Carthy passed on his guitar style to French guitarist Pierre Bensusan. It was taken up in Scotland by Dick Gaughan, and by Irish musicians like Paul Brady, Dónal Lunny and Mick Moloney. Carthy also influenced Paul Simon, particularly evident on Scarborough Fair, which he probably taught to Simon, and a recording of Davy's "Anji" that appears on Sounds of Silence, and as a result was copied by many subsequent folk guitarists. By the 1970s, Americans such as Duck Baker and Eric Schoenberg were arranging solo guitar versions of Celtic dance tunes, slow airs, bagpipe music, and harp pieces by Turlough O'Carolan and earlier harper-composers. Renbourn and Jansch's complex sounds were also highly influential on Mike Oldfield's early music. The style also had an impact within British folk rock, where particularly Richard Thompson, used the D–A–D–G–A–D tuning, though with a hybrid picking style to produce a similar but distinctive effect.

=== "New Age" approach ===
In 1976, William Ackerman started Windham Hill Records, which carried on the Takoma tradition of original compositions on solo steel-string guitar. However, instead of the folk and blues-oriented music of Takoma, including Fahey's American primitive guitar, the early Windham Hill artists (and others influenced by them) abandoned the steady alternating or monotonic bass in favor of sweet flowing arpeggios and flamenco-inspired percussive techniques. The label's best-selling artist George Winston and others used a similar approach on piano. This music was generally pacific, accessible, and expressionistic. Eventually, this music acquired the label of "New Age", given its widespread use as background music at bookstores, spas, and other New Age businesses. The designation has stuck, though it was not a term coined by the company itself.

=== Percussive approach ===
"Percussive fingerstyle" is a term for a style incorporating sharp attacks on the strings, as well as hitting the strings and guitar top with the hand for percussive effect. Principally, it features string slapping, guitar body percussion, alternate tunings, and extended techniques such as tapping and harmonics. Flamenco and Blues guitarists regularly feature percussive techniques and alternate tunings, and arguably laid the foundations for playing in this way Michael Hedges and Eric Roche developed and essentially pioneered percussive techniques, forming a style of their own in the 1980s and '90s. Their progressive contribution played a significant role in influencing a new wave of percussive players, including Andy Mckee, Preston Reed, Jon Gomm, Mike Dawes, Chris Woods, Don Ross, Declan Zapala, Erik Mongrain, and Marcin Patrzałek.

=== Funky approaches ===
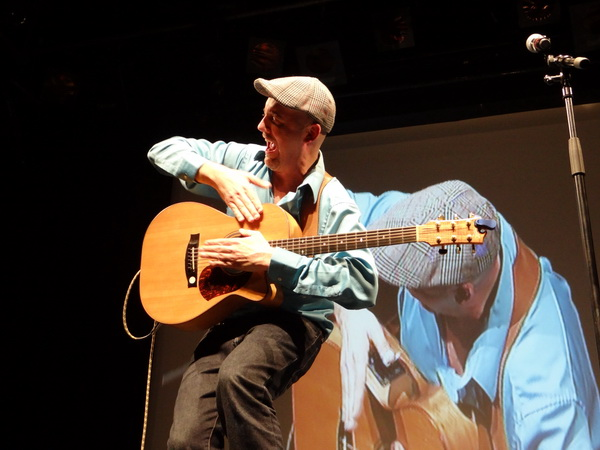
Adam Rafferty

"Funky fingerstyle" emerged in the mid-2000s as a style in which the sounds of a full funk or R&B ensemble are emulated on one guitar. Uncommon sounds are being discovered thanks to the technical possibilities of various pick-ups, microphones, and octave division effects pedals. Adam Rafferty uses a technique of hip-hop vocal percussion called "human beat box", along with body percussion, while playing contrapuntal fingerstyle pieces. Petteri Sariola has several microphones on board his guitar and is able to run up to six lines from his guitar to a mixing desk, providing a full "band sound" – bass drum, snare, bass, guitar – as an accompaniment to his vocals.

=== African fingerstyle ===
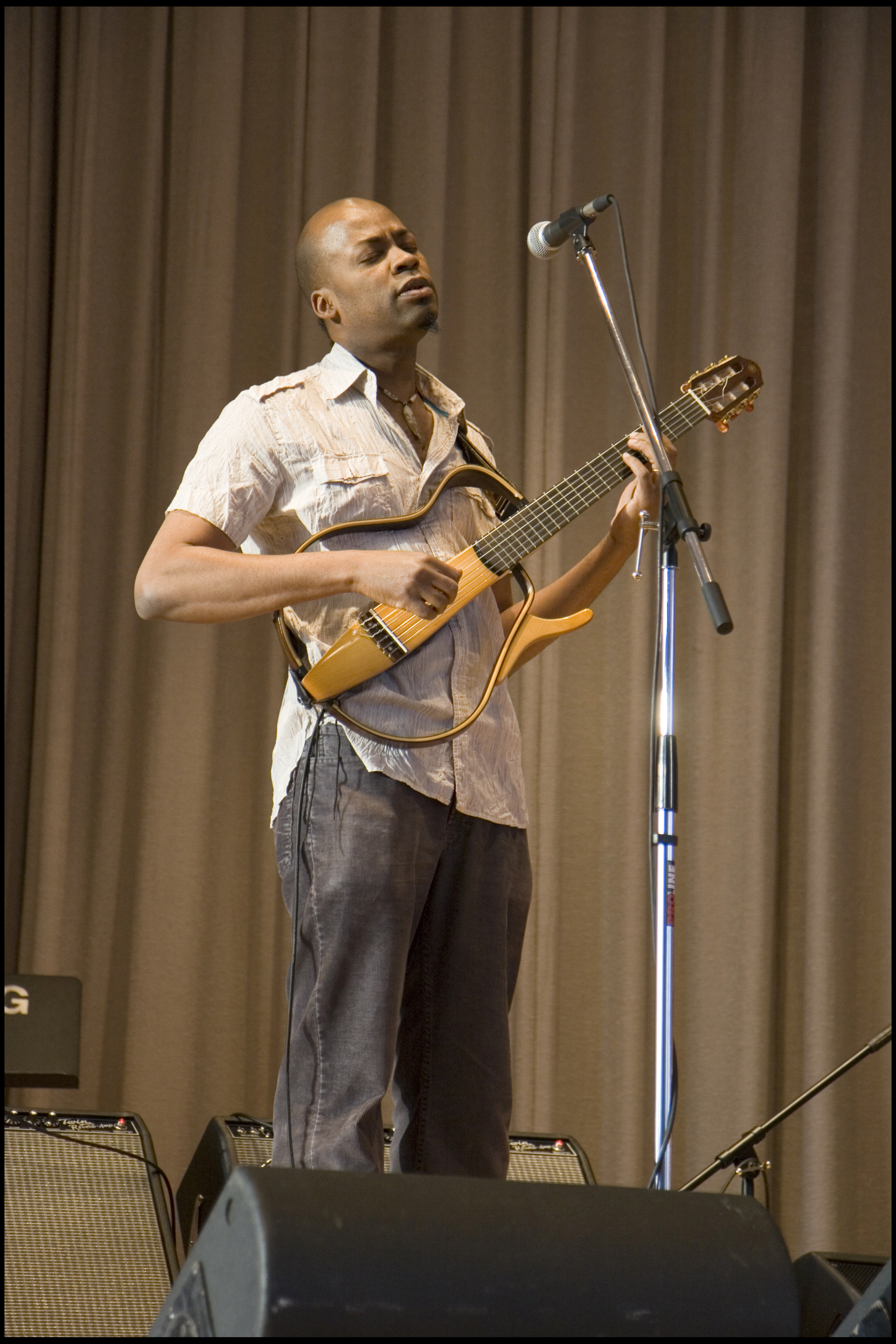
Lionel Loueke, playing a skeleton guitar

The six-string guitar was brought to Africa by traders and missionaries (although indigenous guitar-like instruments exist, such as the ngoni and the gimbri or sintir of Gnawa music). Its uptake varies considerably between regions, and, so no single African acoustic guitar style exists. In some cases, the styles and techniques of other instruments have been applied to the guitar; for instance, a technique where the strings are plucked with the thumb and one finger imitates the two-thumbed plucking of the kora and mbira. The pioneer of Congolese fingerstyle acoustic guitar music was Jean Bosco Mwenda, also known as Mwenda wa Bayeke (1930–1990). His song "Masanga" was particularly influential, because of its complex and varied guitar part. His influences included traditional music of Zambia and the eastern Congo, Cuban groups like the Trio Matamoros, and cowboy movies. His style used the thumb and index finger only, to produce bass, melody, and accompaniment. Congolese guitarists Losta Abelo and Edouard Masengo played in a similar style.

Herbert Misango and George Mukabi were fingerstyle guitarists from Kenya. Ali Farka Toure (d. 2006) was a guitarist from Mali, whose music has been called the "DNA of the blues". He was also often compared to John Lee Hooker. His son Vieux Farka Toure continues to play in the same style. Djelimady Tounkara is another Malian fingerstylist. S. E. Rogie and Koo Nimo play acoustic fingerstyle in the lilting, calypso-influenced palm wine music tradition. Benin-born Jazz guitarist Lionel Loueke uses fingerstyle in an approach that combines jazz harmonies and complex rhythms. He is now based in the US.

Tony Cox (b. 1954) is a Zimbabwean guitarist and composer based in Cape Town, South Africa. A master of the fingerpicking] style of guitar playing, he has won the South African Music Award for best instrumental album twice. His music incorporates many different styles, including classical, blues, rock, and jazz, while keeping an African flavour. Tinderwet is a versatile guitarist of the three and sometimes four fingers playing style (thumb, index, middle, and ring); he plays several different African styles, including soukous or West African music. He often flavours his playing with jazzy improvisations, regular fingerpicking patterns, and chord melody sequences.

== Slide, steel, and slack-key guitar ==
Even when the guitar is tuned in a manner that helps the guitarist to perform a certain type of chord, having all six strings sound is often undesirable. When strumming with a plectrum, a guitarist must "damp" (mute) unwanted strings with the fretting hand; when a slide or steel is employed, this fretting hand damping is no longer possible, so replacing plectrum strumming with plucking of individual strings becomes necessary. For this reason, slide guitar- and steel guitar-playing are very often fingerstyle.

=== Slide guitar ===
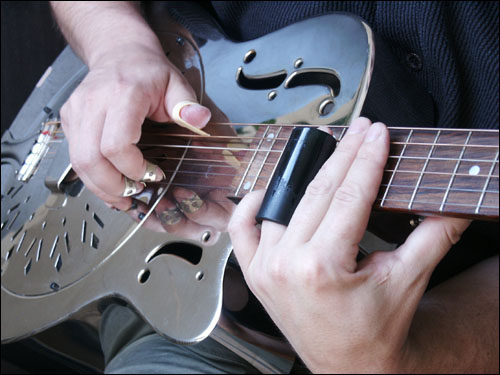
Example of a bottleneck, with fingerpicks and resonator guitar

Slide guitar or bottleneck guitar is a particular method or technique for playing the guitar. The term "slide" refers to the motion of the slide against the strings, while "bottleneck" refers to the original material of choice for such slides, the necks of glass bottles. Instead of altering the pitch of the strings in the normal manner (by pressing the string against frets), a slide is placed on the string to vary its vibrating length and pitch. This slide can then be moved along the string without lifting, creating continuous transitions in pitch.

Slide guitar is most often played (assuming a right-handed player and guitar):

- With the guitar in the normal position, using a slide called a 'bottleneck' on one of the fingers of the left hand - this is known as bottleneck guitar
- With the guitar held horizontally, with the belly uppermost and the bass strings toward the player, and using a slide called a steel held in the left hand - this is known as lap steel guitar.

=== Slack-key guitar ===
Slack-key guitar is a fingerpicked style that originated in Hawaii. The English term is a translation of the Hawaiian kī hō‘alu, which means "loosen the [tuning] key". Slack key is nearly always played in open or altered tunings—the most common tuning is G-major (D–G–D–G–B–D), called taropatch, though a family of major-seventh tunings is called wahine (Hawaiian for "woman"), as well as tunings designed to get particular effects. Basic slack-key style, like mainland folk-based fingerstyle, establishes an alternating bass pattern with the thumb and plays the melody line with the fingers on the higher strings. The repertory is rooted in traditional, post-contact Hawaiian song and dance, but since 1946 (when the first commercial slack key recordings were made), the style has expanded, and some contemporary compositions have a distinctly new-age sound. Slack key's older generation included Gabby Pahinui, Leonard Kwan, Sonny Chillingworth, and Raymond Kāne. Prominent contemporary players include Keola Beamer, Moses Kahumoku, Ledward Kaapana, Dennis Kamakahi, John Keawe, Ozzie Kotani, Peter Moon, and Cyril Pahinui.

== Electric guitar ==
=== Fingerstyle jazz guitar ===
The unaccompanied guitar in jazz is often played in chord-melody style, where the guitarist plays a series of chords with the melody line on top. Fingerstyle, plectrum, or hybrid picking are equally suited to this style. Some players alternate between fingerstyle and plectrum playing, "palming" the plectrum when it is not in use. Early blues and ragtime guitarists often used fingerstyle. True fingerstyle jazz guitar dates back to early swing era acoustic players like Eddie Lang (1902–1933) Lonnie Johnson (1899–1970) and Carl Kress (1907–1965), Dick McDonough (1904–1938) and the Argentinian Oscar Alemán (1909–1980). Django Reinhardt (1910–1953) used a classical/flamenco technique on unaccompanied pieces such as his composition Tears.

Fingerstyle jazz on the electric guitar was pioneered by George van Eps (1913–1998) who was respected for his polyphonic approach, sometimes using a seven string guitar. Wes Montgomery (1925–1968) was known for using the fleshy part of his thumb to provide the bass line while strumming chordal or melodic motives with his fingers. This style, while unorthodox, was widely regarded as an innovative method for enhancing the warm tone associated with jazz guitar. Montgomery's influence extends to modern polyphonic jazz improvisational methods. Joe Pass (1929–1994) switched to fingerstyle mid career, making the Virtuoso series of albums. Little known to the general public Ted Greene (1946–2005) was admired by fellow musicians for his harmonic skills. Lenny Breau (1941–1984) went one better than van Eps by playing virtuosic fingerstyle on an eight string guitar. Tommy Crook replaced the lower two strings on his Gibson switchmaster with bass strings, allowing him to create the impression of playing bass and guitar simultaneously. Chet Atkins (1924–2001) sometimes applied his formidable right-hand technique to jazz standards, with Duck Baker (b. 1949), Richard Smith (b. 1971), Woody Mann and Tommy Emmanuel (b. 1955), among others, following in his footsteps. They use the fingerpicking technique of Merle Travis and others to play wide variety of material including jazz. This style is distinguished by having a steadier and "busier" (several beats to the bar) bass line than the chord melody approach of Montgomery and Pass making it suited to up-tempo material.

Fingerstyle has always been predominant in Latin American guitar playing, which Laurindo Almeida (1917–1995) and Charlie Byrd (1925–1999) brought to a wider audience in the 1950s. Fingerstyle jazz guitar has several proponents: the pianistic Jeff Linsky (b. 1952), freely improvises polyphonically while employing a classical guitar technique. Earl Klugh (b. 1953) and Tuck Andress have also performed fingerstyle jazz on the solo guitar. Briton Martin Taylor (b. 1956), a former Stephane Grappelli sideman, switched to fingerstyle on relaunching his career as a soloist. His predecessor in Grappelli's band, John Etheridge (b. 1948) is also an occasional fingerstyle player.

=== Electric blues and rock ===
The solid-body electric guitar is rarely played fingerstyle, although it presents no major technical challenges. Slide guitarists often employ fingerstyle, which applies equally to the electric guitar, for instance Duane Allman and Ry Cooder. Blues guitarists have long used fingerstyle: some exponents include Jorma Kaukonen, Hubert Sumlin, Albert King, Albert Collins, John Lee Hooker, Muddy Waters, Derek Trucks, John Mayer, Joe Bonamassa, Sandor Enyedi and Buckethead. Exponents of fingerstyle rock guitar include: Mark Knopfler, Jeff Beck (formerly a pick player), Stephen Malkmus, Bruce Cockburn (exclusively), Robby Krieger, Lindsey Buckingham, Mike Oldfield, Patrick Simmons, Elliott Smith, Wilko Johnson, J.J. Cale, Robbie Robertson, Hillel Slovak, St. Vincent, Yvette Young, Kurt Vile, David Longstreth, Richie Kotzen (formerly a pick player), Greg Koch, Guy King, Courtney Barnett, Jared James Nichols.

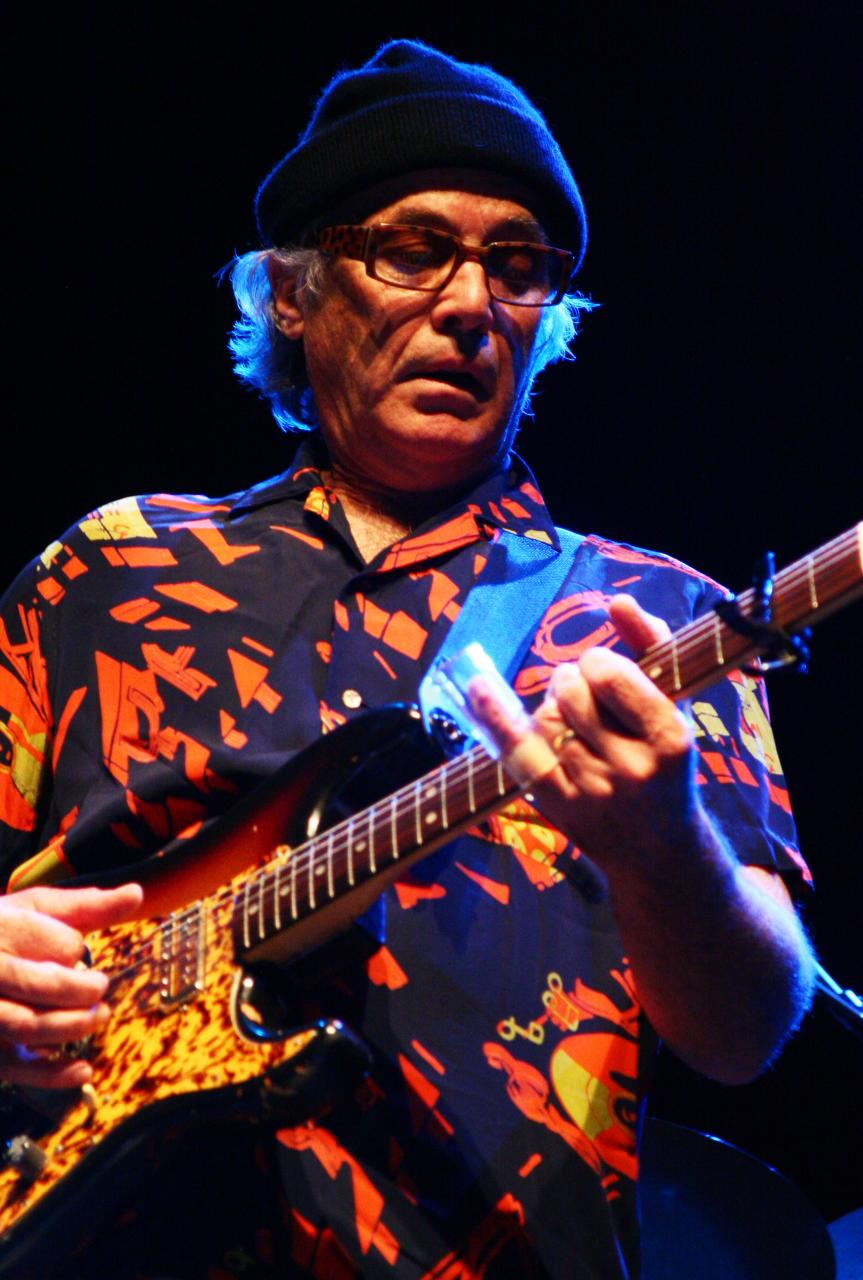
Ry Cooder

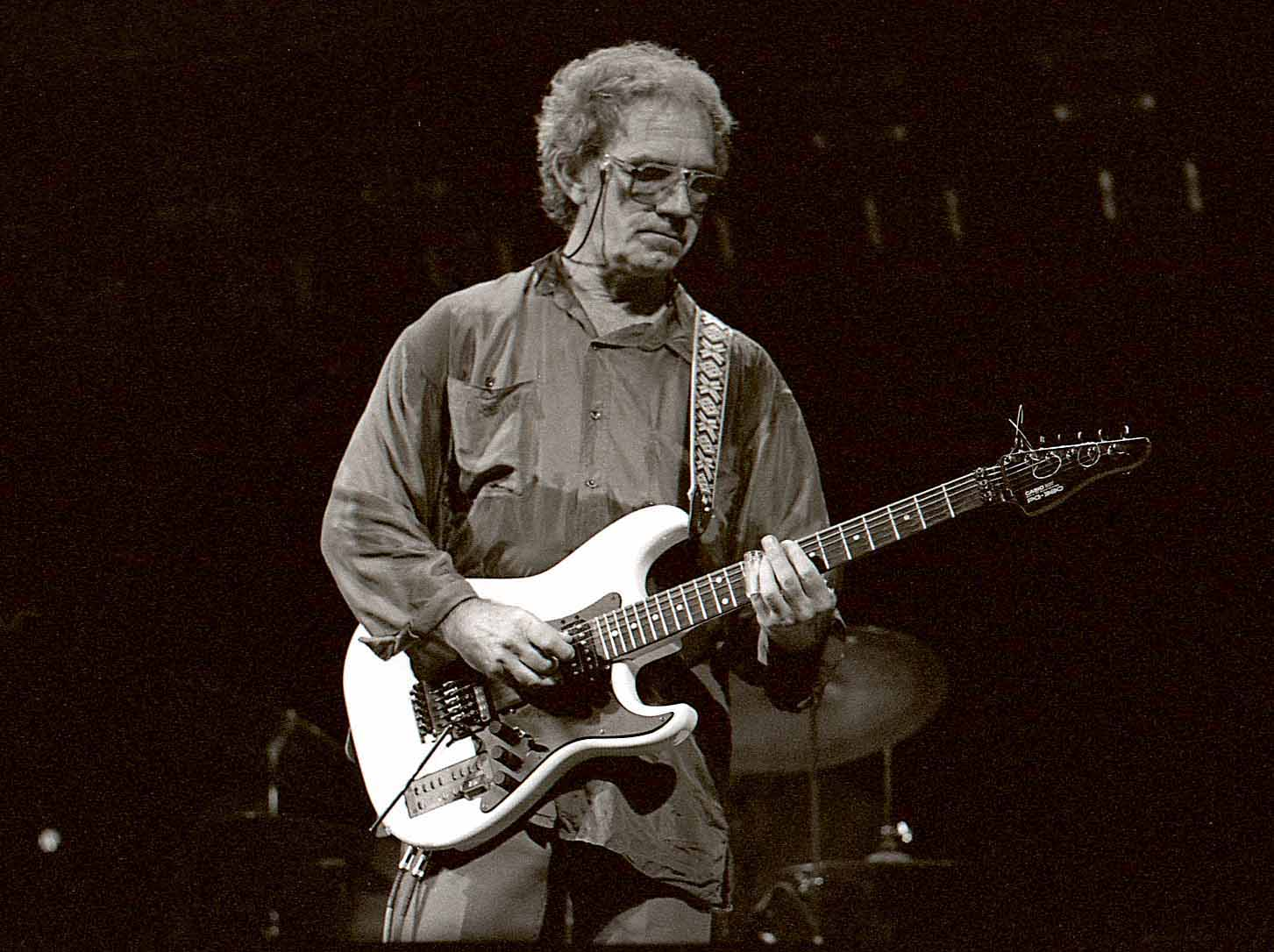
J. J. Cale

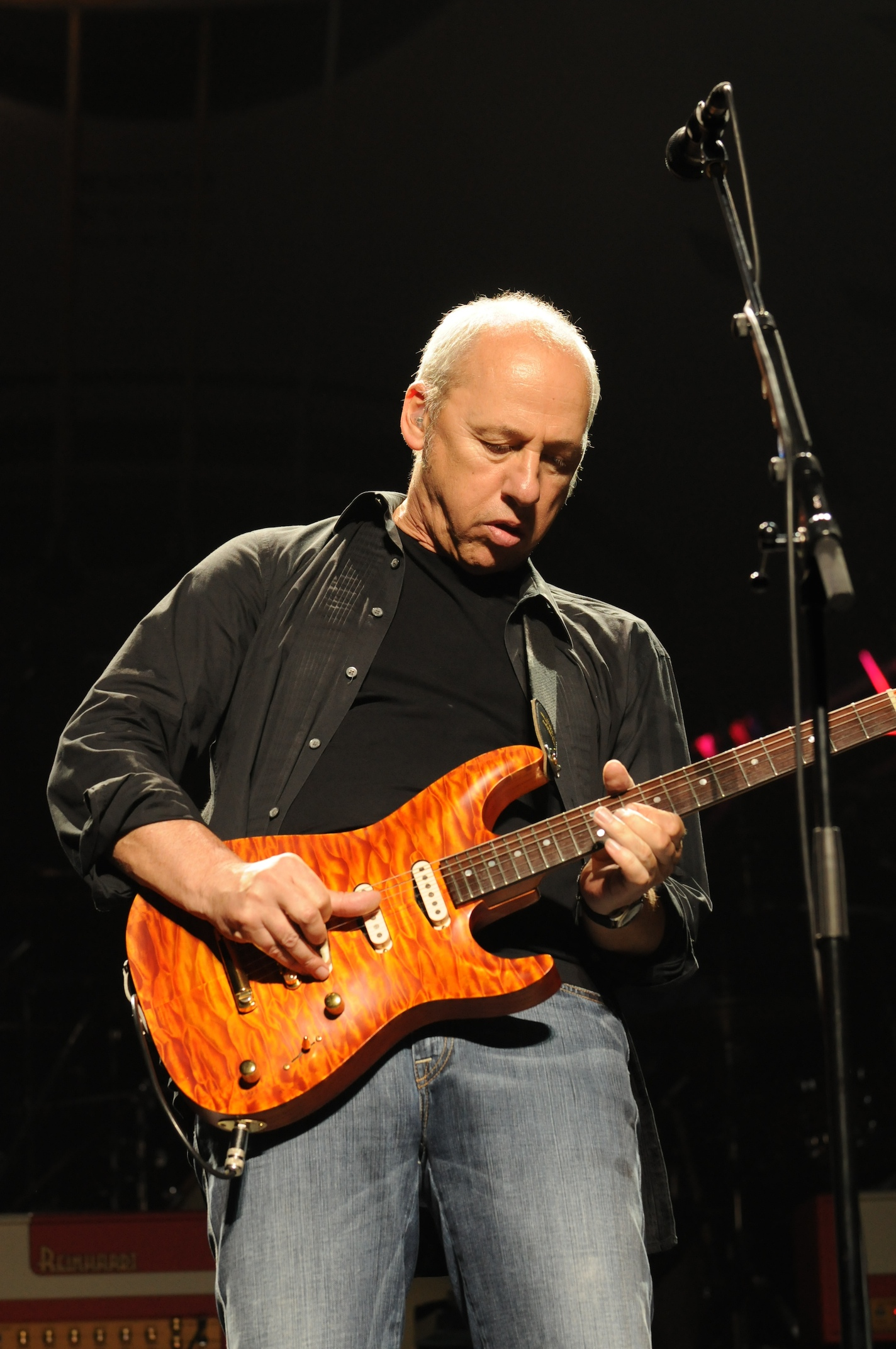
Mark Knopfler

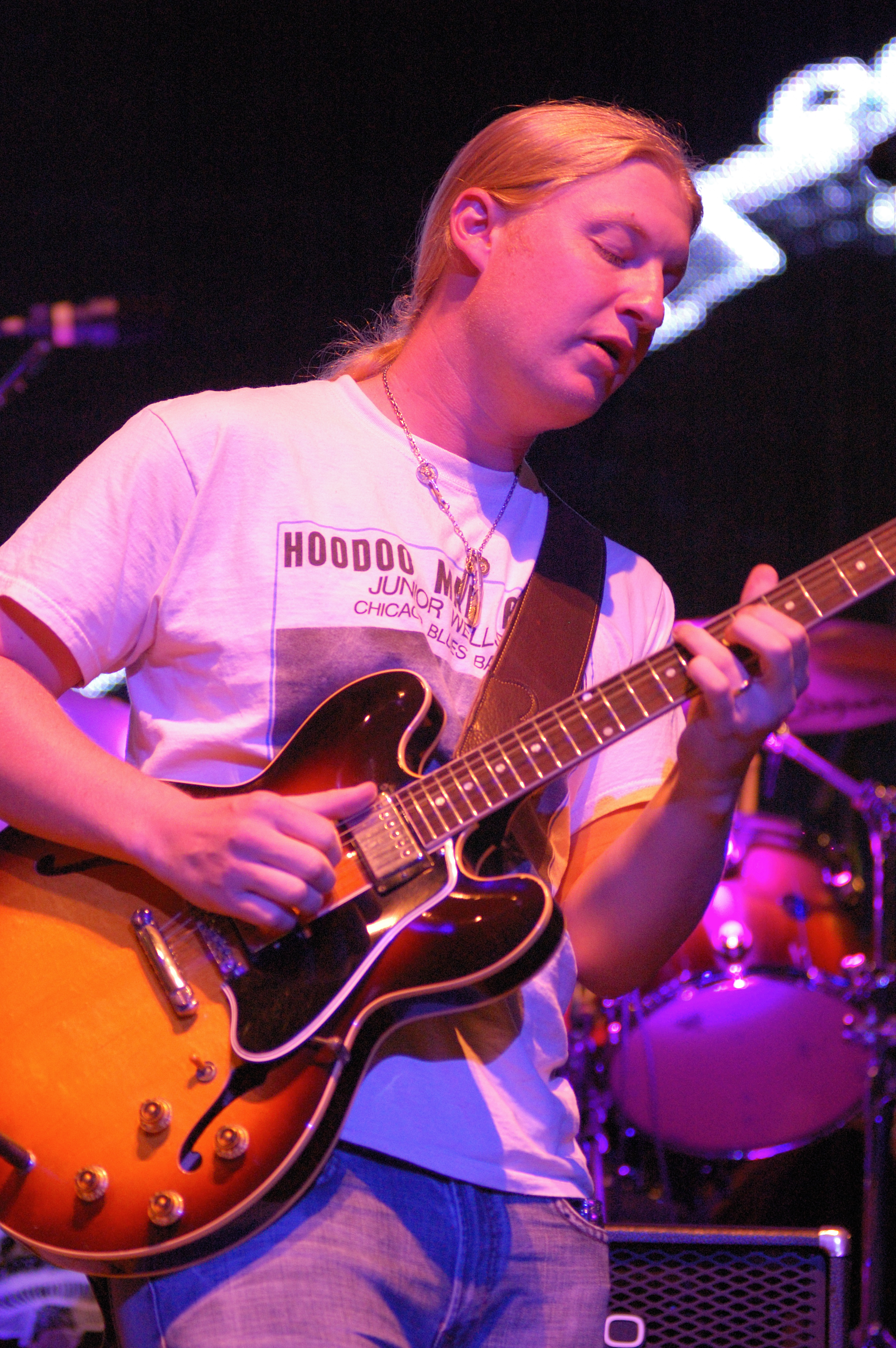
Derek Trucks

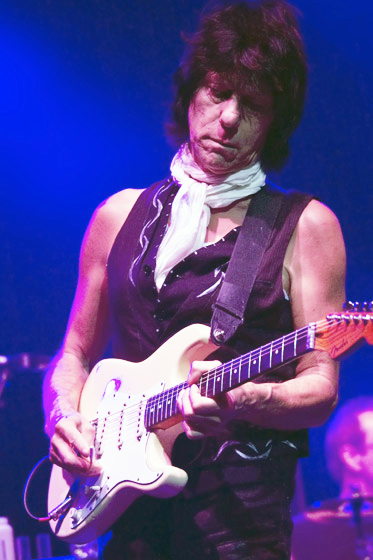
Jeff Beck

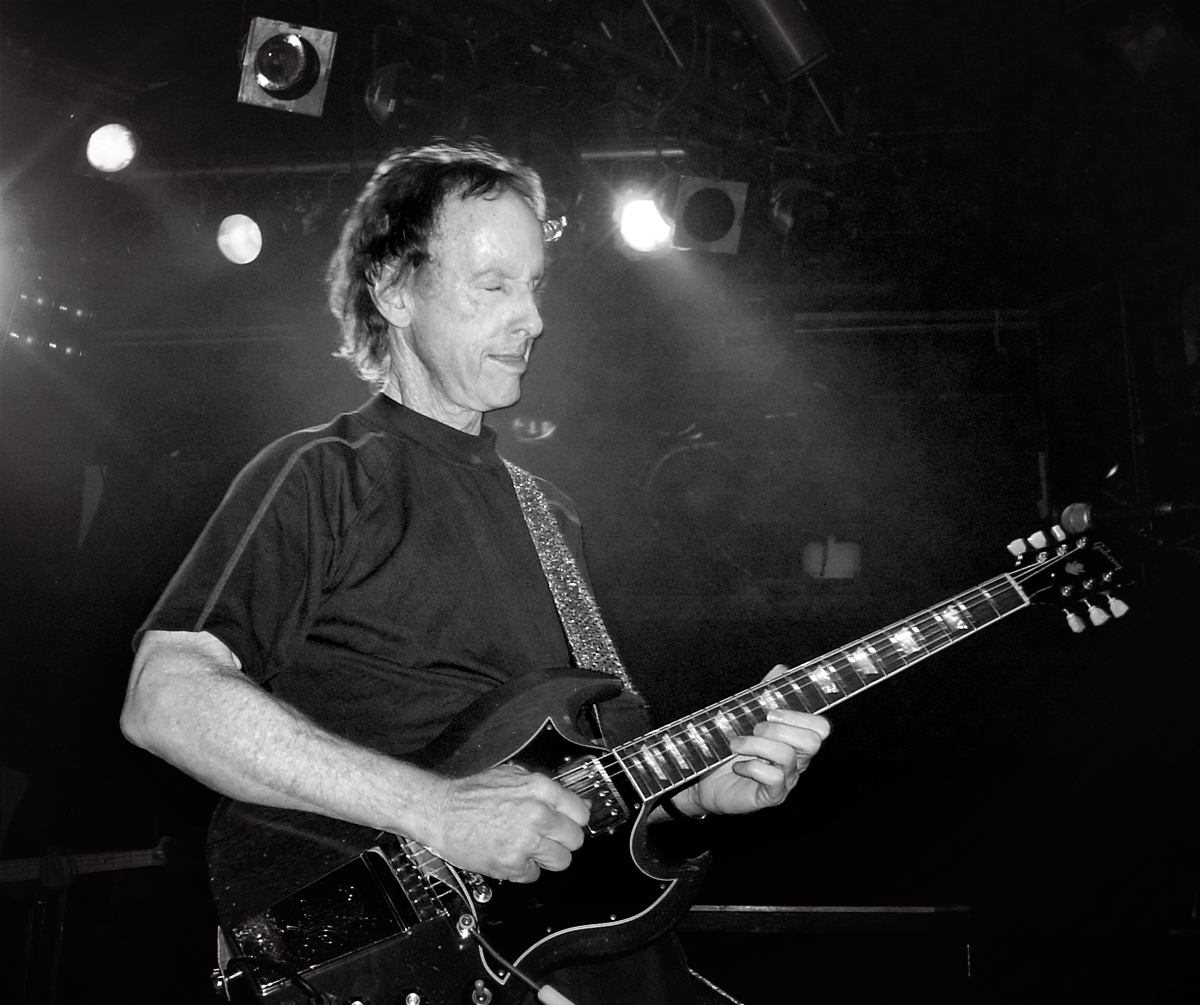
Robby Krieger

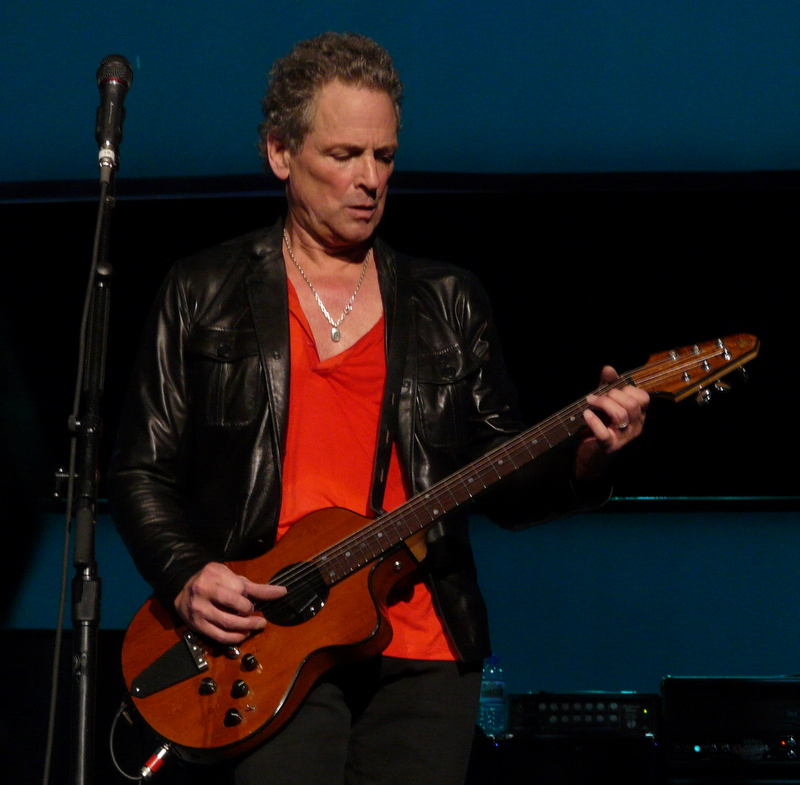
Lindsey Buckingham

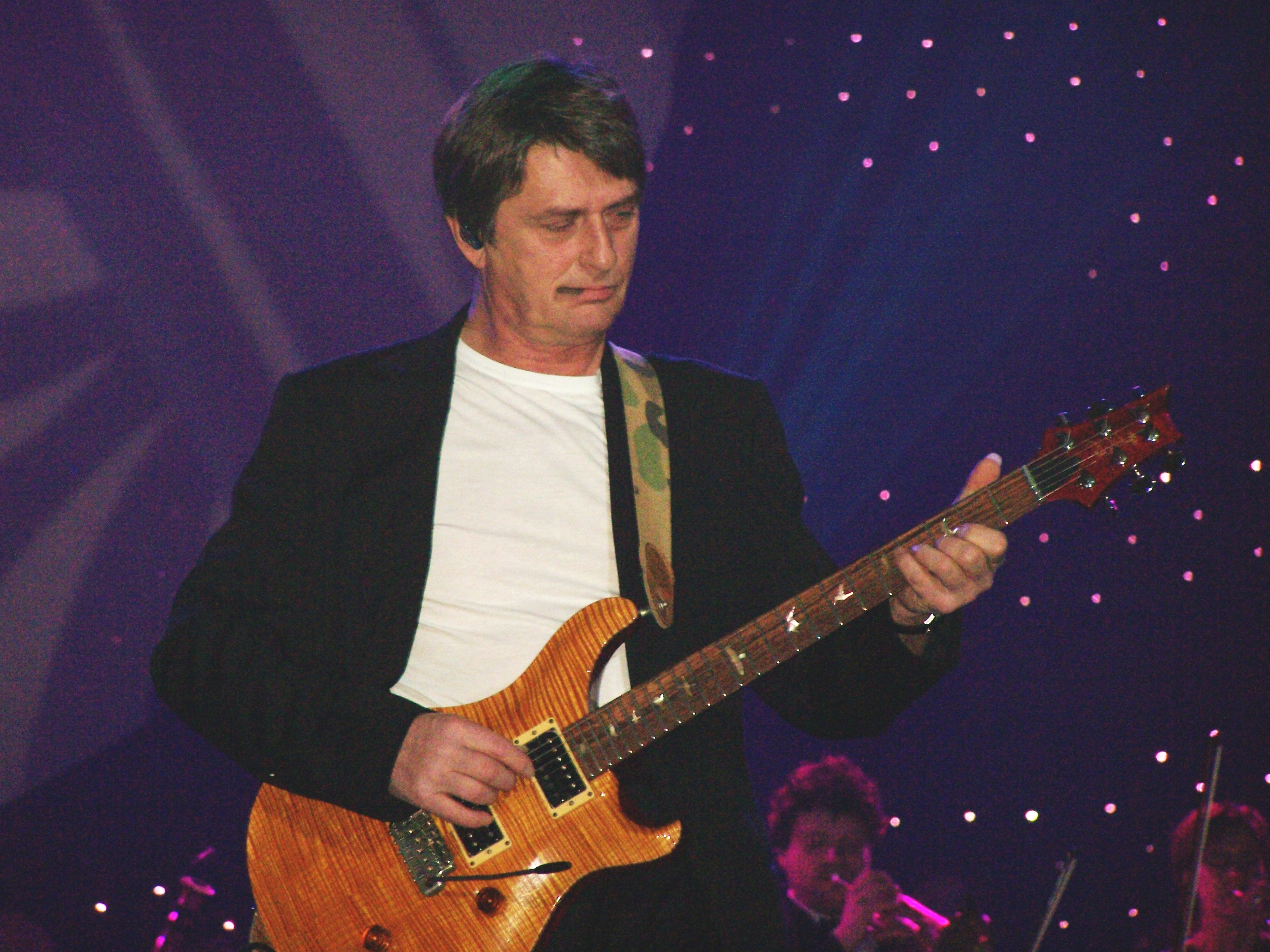
Mike Oldfield

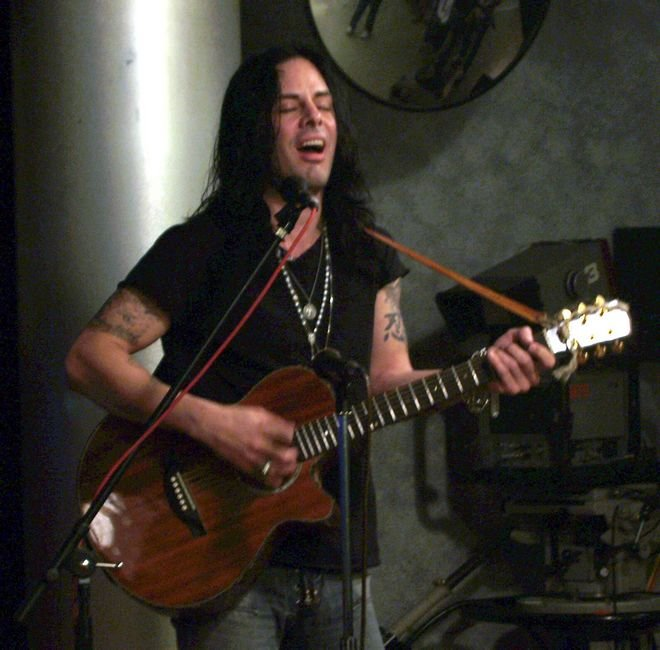
Richie Kotzen

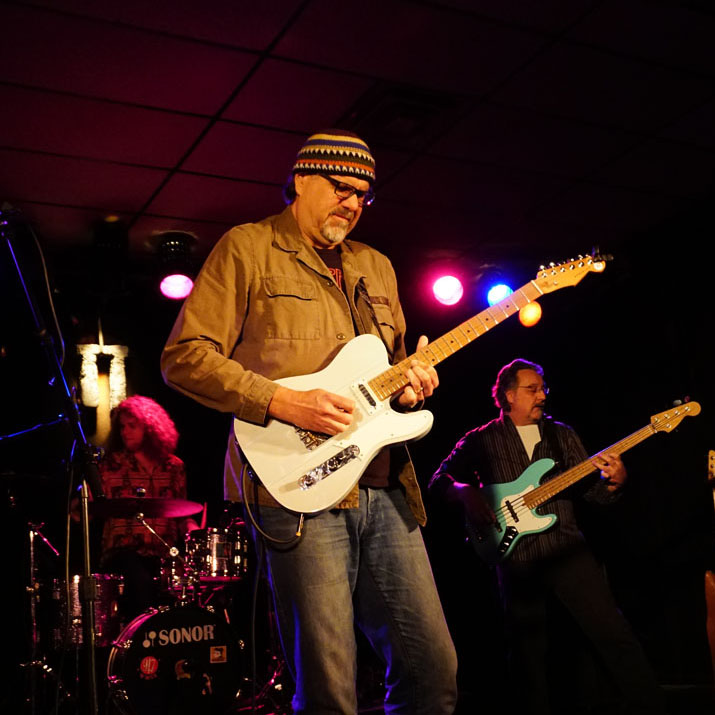
Greg Koch

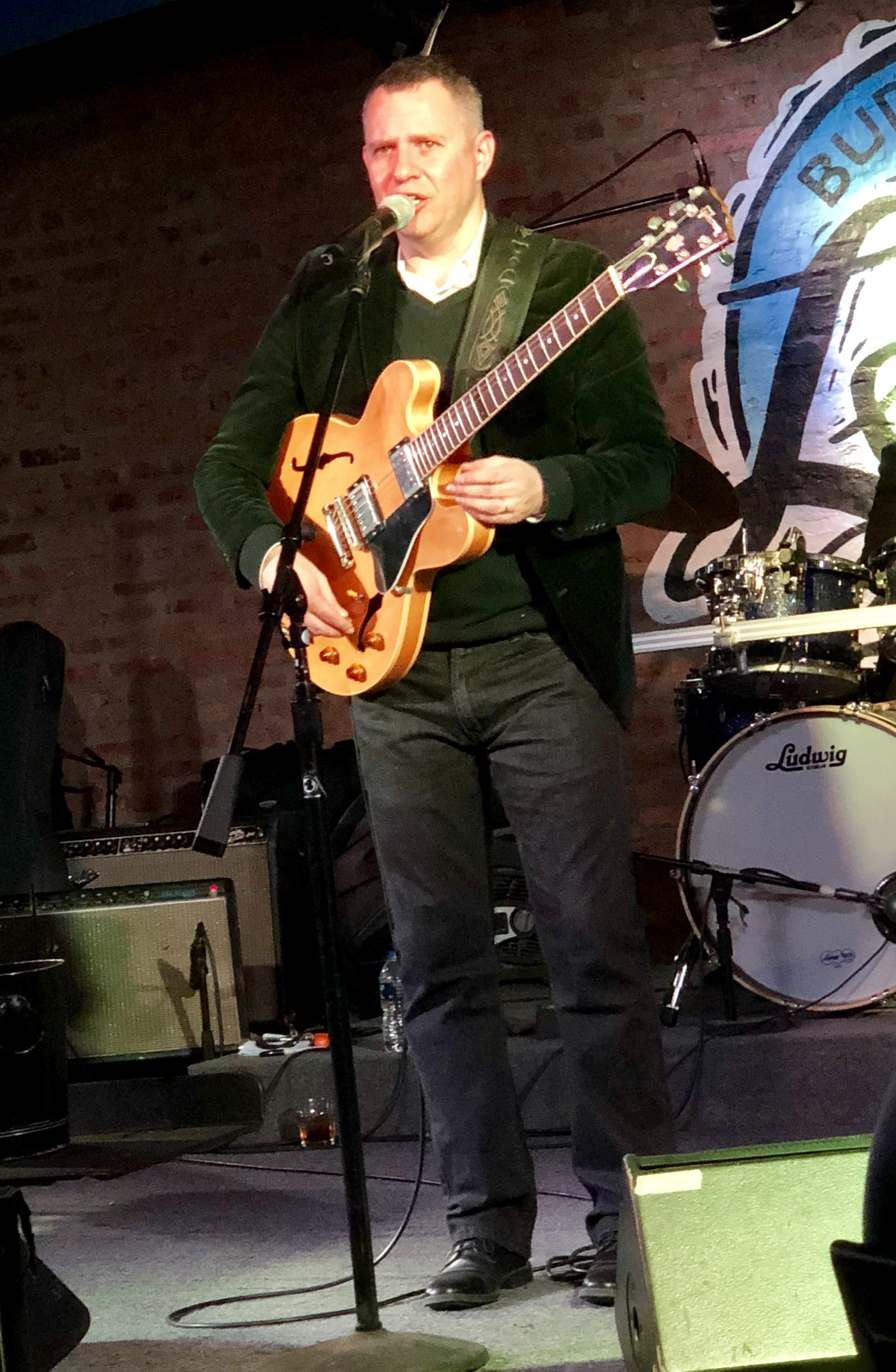
Guy King

== See also ==
- Cotten picking
