= Sonny Lim =

- Sonny Lim, Slack Key Guitarist

Background information
- Origin: Waimea, Hawaii County, Hawaii
- Instruments: Slack-key guitar

Elmer "Sonny" Lim is a Hawaiian musician and slack key guitar player from Waimea (Kamuela) on the Big Island of Hawaii. Sonny is part of the musical Lim Family of North Kohala.

Sonny's father, Elmer Lim Sr., who was a Paniolo (Hawaiian cowboy) on the famed Parker ranch and later worked for the ranch himself. In this respect, Sonny carries on the slack key tradition born amongst Waimea Cowboys over a hundred years earlier. Like Ledward Kaapana, however, Sonny learned primarily from Kaapana's uncle, Kalapana slack key master Fred Punahoa, who moved in with Sonny's family for several weeks to teach him.

In addition to playing with the Lim Family, Sonny played with the Makaha Sons of Ni’ihau (using the stage name "Kohala") in the late-1970s, and he has shared the stage with many other Hawaiian artists such as Cyril Pahinui.

He can be heard on the Grammy Award-winning anthology album, "Slack Key Guitar Volume 2", as well as his solo debut album.

"Slack Key Guitar: The Artistry of Sonny Lim," was nominated for a Grammy Award for Best Hawaiian Music Album.

Both albums available on Palm Records.
