= Keala =

Keala is a given name of Hawaiian origin. Notable people with the given name include:

- Keala Keanaaina (born 1976), American football player
- Keala Kennelly (born 1977), American surfer
- Leonard Keala Kwan, (1931-2000), slack-key guitar performer who recorded in the 1950s-1960s.
- Keala O'Sullivan (born 1950), American diver
- Keala Settle (born 1975), American actress
