= Waimānalo, Hawaii =

Census-designated place in Hawaii, United States

Waimānalo
- Census-designated place
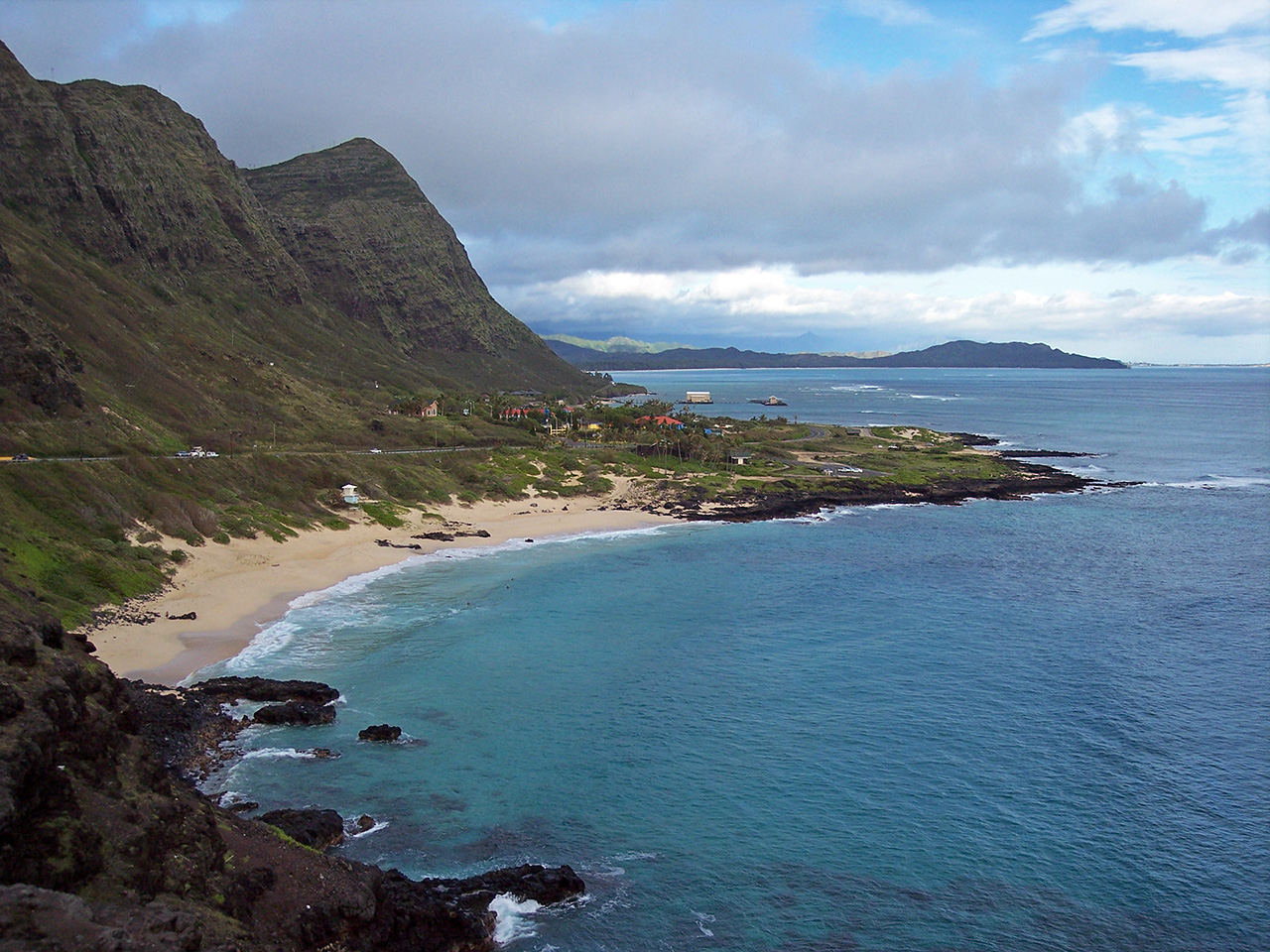
- The southern view of Makapu'u Beach Park, looking north from Kalanianaʻole Highway in March 2007.

- Location in Honolulu County and the state of Hawaii

- Traditional Ahupua'a of Waimānalo (easternmost)
- Coordinates: 21°20′45″N 157°43′5″W
- Country: United States
- State: Hawaii
- County: Honolulu

Area
  - Total: 4.36 sq mi (11.29 km^{2})
  - Land: 4.36 sq mi (11.29 km^{2})
  - Water: 0 sq mi (0.00 km^{2})
- Elevation: 30 ft (9.1 m)

Population (2020)
  - Total: 6,057
  - Density: 1,390/sq mi (536.6/km^{2})
- ZIP code: 96795
- Area code: 808
- FIPS code: 15-78050

Waimānalo (Hawaiian pronunciation: [vɐjmaːˈnɐlo]) is a census-designated place (CDP) in the District of Koʻolaupoko, in the City & County of Honolulu, on the island of Oʻahu, Hawaii, United States. This small windward community is near the eastern end of the island. Waimānalo means "potable water"; it is so named for the many brackish ponds in the area that were used for irrigation. As of the 2020 census, the CDP had a population of 6,057.

About 1000 meters east of Waimānalo is the neighborhood of Waimānalo Beach. Waimānalo has a small commercial center along Kalanianaʻole Highway, but is separated from the shoreline and Waimānalo Beach (the longest stretch of sandy shoreline on Oʻahu) by Bellows Air Force Station. Waimānalo is noteworthy for its local flavor and large agricultural lots in the valley that extend back towards the Koʻolau from the center of town. Numerous plant nurseries are in this area. There are no hotels in Waimānalo.

Waimānalo is the site of Sea Life Park, near Hawaiʻi Kai on Kalanianaole Highway. Its U.S. postal code is 96795.

== Geography ==
Waimānalo is located at 21°20′45″N 157°43′5″W. The nearest towns are Kailua to the west and Waimānalo Beach to the east. Waimānalo Beach is within the traditional Ahupua'a of Waimānalo. According to the United States Census Bureau, the CDP has an area of 4.4 square miles (11.3 km^{2}), all land.

=== Climate ===
Climate data for Waimānalo, Hawaii (1991–2020 normals, extremes 1907–present)
Month	Jan	Feb	Mar	Apr	May	Jun	Jul	Aug	Sep	Oct	Nov	Dec	Year
Record high °F (°C)	89 (32)	89 (32)	89 (32)	92 (33)	93 (34)	94 (34)	96 (36)	92 (33)	95 (35)	95 (35)	90 (32)	90 (32)	96 (36)
Mean daily maximum °F (°C)	78.2 (25.7)	78.0 (25.6)	78.5 (25.8)	79.9 (26.6)	81.4 (27.4)	83.3 (28.5)	84.4 (29.1)	85.0 (29.4)	85.3 (29.6)	84.1 (28.9)	81.6 (27.6)	79.1 (26.2)	81.6 (27.6)
Daily mean °F (°C)	71.5 (21.9)	71.7 (22.1)	72.6 (22.6)	74.4 (23.6)	75.8 (24.3)	78.0 (25.6)	79.1 (26.2)	79.7 (26.5)	79.5 (26.4)	78.3 (25.7)	76.0 (24.4)	73.5 (23.1)	75.8 (24.3)
Mean daily minimum °F (°C)	64.8 (18.2)	65.4 (18.6)	66.7 (19.3)	68.9 (20.5)	70.1 (21.2)	72.7 (22.6)	73.7 (23.2)	74.3 (23.5)	73.7 (23.2)	72.6 (22.6)	70.5 (21.4)	67.8 (19.9)	70.1 (21.2)
Record low °F (°C)	52 (11)	52 (11)	54 (12)	55 (13)	56 (13)	62 (17)	64 (18)	65 (18)	59 (15)	58 (14)	56 (13)	54 (12)	52 (11)
Average rainfall inches (mm)	4.79 (122)	4.45 (113)	5.40 (137)	3.26 (83)	2.43 (62)	1.26 (32)	1.86 (47)	1.97 (50)	2.62 (67)	3.54 (90)	5.40 (137)	5.45 (138)	42.43 (1,078)
Average rainy days (≥ 0.01 in)	15.7	12.9	15.3	12.6	11.7	11.0	14.6	13.2	13.3	14.1	15.9	18.7	169.0
Source: NOAA

== Demographics ==
Historical population
Census	Pop.	Note	%±
2020	6,057		—
U.S. Decennial Census

As of the census of 2000, there were 3,664 people, 849 households, and 751 families in the CDP. The population density was 9,319.0 inhabitants per square mile (3,598.1/km^{2}). There were 904 housing units at an average density of 2,299.2 per square mile (887.7/km^{2}). The racial makeup of the CDP was 10.84% White, 0.16% Black or African American, 0.14% Native American, 26.80% Asian, 24.73% Pacific Islander, 0.33% from other races, and 37.01% from two or more races. 10.37% of the population were Hispanic or Latino of any race.

There were 849 households, 38.9% had children under the age of 18 living with them, 59.4% were married couples living together, 21.0% had a female householder with no husband present, and 11.5% were non-families. 8.5% of households were one person, and 3.3% were one person aged 65 or older. The average household size was 4.31 and the average family size was 4.42.

In the community 31.4% of the population was under the age of 18, 10.7% was from 18 to 24, 28.8% from 25 to 44, 20.7% from 45 to 64, and 8.4% 65 or older. The median age was 30 years. For every 100 females there were 97.2 males. For every 100 females age 18 and over, there were 93.8 males.

The median household income was $47,594 and the median family income was $43,347. Males had a median income of $28,036 versus $21,621 for females. The per capita income for the CDP was $12,493. 8.1% of the population and 5.9% of families were below the poverty line. Out of the total population, 9.6% of those under the age of 18 and 5.7% of those 65 and older were living below the poverty line.

== Tourism ==
Waimānalo is the home of Sea Life Park, a marine biology and sea-life attraction near Makapu'u Beach. Japanese sumo grand champion Chad Rowan (aka Akebono) was born in Waimānalo. A large statue of him stands at the Waimānalo Shopping Center and serves as a tourist photo opportunity.

== Notable residents ==
- Richard Chamberlain, actor known for playing Dr. Kildare in the series by that name, died here in 2025.
- Sasha Colby, drag performer and winner of Season 15 of RuPaul's Drag Race
- Magnum P.I., the character from the eponymous TV series lived in Waimānalo.
- Tetairoa McMillan, wide receiver for the Arizona Wildcats and Carolina Panthers first-round pick, winner of the 2022 Polynesian Football Player of the Year Award
- Chad Rowan, better known as Akebono, the 64th and first non-Japanese sumo wrestler to reach the highest rank of yokozuna in 1993
- Barack Hussein Obama, the 44th president of the United States, has a house in Waimānalo.
- Gabby Pahinui and his son Cyril Pahinui, both renowned slack-key guitarists.
