= Fred Punahoa =

- Born: April 25, 1919
- Origin: Hawaii
- Died: March 10, 1985 (aged 65)
- Occupations: Musician
- Instruments: Slack-key guitar

Fred Punahoa Konanui (also spelled "Punahou") (April 25, 1919 - March 10, 1985) was a Hawaiian musician and slack key guitar player from Kalapana, Hawaii. Though only two known recordings exist of "Uncle Fred," he remains one of the most influential slack key artists of all time.

His legacy as a teacher can be attested to by such prominent students as Ledward Kaapana and Sonny Lim, both now-famous slack key guitarists who credit Uncle Fred as a primary teacher and inspiration.

The only known recordings of Konanui consist of two songs from the 1974 Waimea Music Festival CD, which were given generic titles on the track list but have since become known as "Mauna Loa Slack Key", and "Punahoa Special". These songs are now standards in the slack key cannon, and they have been recorded by Led, Sonny Lim, Makana_(musician), Nick Borho, and many other slack key guitarists.
