= Nedward =

Nedward may refer to:

- Ned Ward (1667–1731), English writer
- Ned Flanders, character in The Simpsons
- Nedward Kaapana, brother of Hawaiian musician Ledward Kaapana
