= Bill Griffin (musician) =

American musician

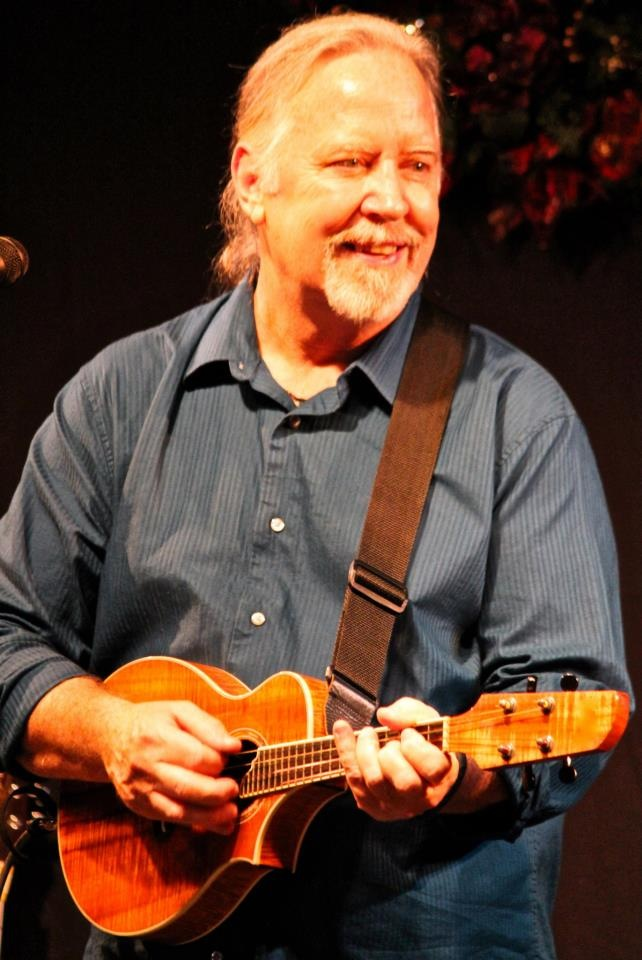
Bill Griffin playing the mandolele, 2012

Bill Griffin is widely known as a musician in both bluegrass and Hawaiian music genres. A luthier and veteran mandolinist, he is also the inventor of the "mandolele", which is a nylon-stringed mandolin that he first crafted in 1986. Born in Glendale, California, Griffin's first exposure to music came through his father, a pianist in a Dixieland jazz band. Griffin began playing ukulele at age five, guitar soon thereafter, and mandolin at age nineteen. He also plays piano and bass.

== Luthier Work and Mandolele ==
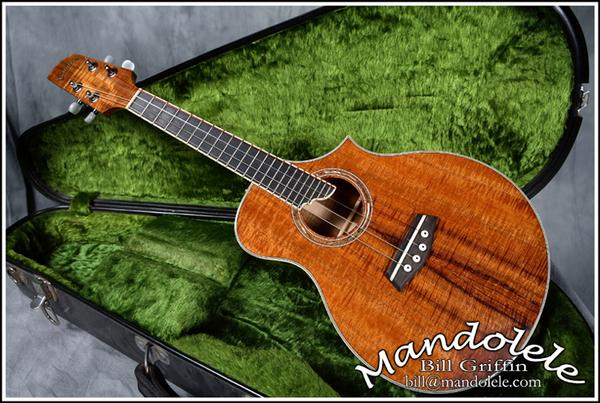
Bill Griffin's mandolele

The foundation of Griffin's work as a luthier began in 1970 when he began working for C. Bruno and Sons, the largest musical instrument wholesale company in the world at that time. While there, he met and began apprenticing under master luthier David Simpson. As a result of learning the trade of luthier, Griffin constructed several instruments of his own design, including the mandocaster (an electric mandolin that he built in 1978) and the mandolele, which he first built in 1986. As for the original motivation for building these instruments, Griffin says that "If I couldn't buy it, I'd build it." Upon settling in the Sacramento area in 2012, Griffin started his own business building the mandolele.

The mandolele is a nylon-stringed mandolin with four strings rather than eight. Griffin built it to achieve the soft tone characteristic of nylon-stringed instruments such as the ukulele, combined with the tuning and feel of an F5 mandolin. The tuning is the same as that of an F5, as is the scale length and overall feel of the instrument. Griffin stated that the idea behind the mandolele is that "mandolin players can enter new musical ground with the instrument." Griffin's use of it has primarily been in Hawaiian music. He says that "It inspires me to play differently simply because the tone is not what you'd expect from a mandolin."

== The Cache Valley Drifters ==
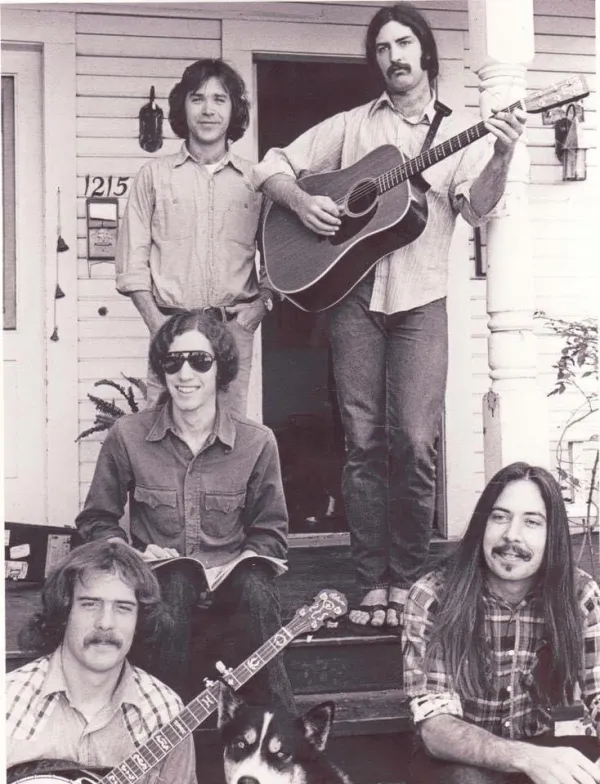
Cache Valley Drifters, 1974

Originally formed in Santa Barbara, CA by Griffin, Cyrus Clarke, and David West, The Cache Valley Drifters have been a fixture of the California bluegrass scene since 1972.

The Cache Valley Drifters recorded three albums for Flying Fish Records between 1979 and 1983 and have appeared at festivals throughout the United States and Europe. After a seven-year hiatus, they reformed in 1992 and went on to start their own label, "Mighty Fine Records." Now composed of Griffin on mandolin, Wally Barnick on bass, and Mike Mullins on guitar, they continue to record and to tour. Their live performances include an annual Sunday morning concert at the Live Oak Music Festival.

== Collaborations with Kate Wolf ==
Griffin met folk music icon Kate Wolf in 1974, and their professional collaborations began when she used the Cache Valley Drifters as her backup band on her 1977 release "Lines on the Paper." Afterward, Griffin worked with Wolf independently as producer and arranger on several of her albums, including "Poet's Heart" which won an award in 1986 for Folk Album of the Year from NAIRD (National Association of Independent Record Distributors). Kate Wolf died in 1986.

== Hawai`i ==
Griffin moved to Hawai`i in 2006. He soon began working at Kanile`a `Ukulele, where he became manager and master luthier. He built his second iteration of the mandolele while in Hawai`i, and became a noted figure in the Hawaiian music scene, playing with such artists as Keale, Kawika Kahiapo, LT Smooth, Patrick Landeza, and Ernie Cruz, Sr. He also became a member of the Saloon Pilots, a Hawai`i-based Americana band, playing mandolin and bass. While in Hawai`i, he met singer Yvonne Elliman and became part of her band for her 2011 performances at the Cotton Club in Tokyo, Japan. Griffin moved back to California in 2012, but continues to play and record with Hawai`i-based artists.

== Selected discography ==
With The Cache Valley Drifters:

- 1979 Cache Valley Drifters - Flying Fish Records
- 1980 Step Up To Big Pay - Flying Fish Records
- 1983 Tools of the Trade - Flying Fish Records
- 1996 White Room - C.M.H. Records
- 1999 Mightfine.net - Mighty Fine Records (U.S.)/Taxim (Germany)
- 2000 Stolen Roses: Songs of the Grateful Dead (Track number one, "Cumberland Blues") - Grateful Dead Records
- 2000 Bluegrass Then and Now - C.M.H. Records
- 2012 CVD Live in Germany - Mighty Fine Records

With Kate Wolf:

- 1977 Lines on the Paper (member of the Cache Valley Drifters, backing band)
- 1979 Safe at Anchor (producer, arranger, musician)
- 1981 Close to You (producer, arranger, musician)
- 1983 Give Yourself to Love (musician)
- 1985 Poet's Heart (producer, arranger, musician)
- 1986 Gold in California (producer, arranger, musician)
- 1988 The Wind Blows Wild (musician)
- 1994 Looking Back at You (producer)
- 2000 Weaver of Visions (producer, arranger, musician)

Other Musical Appearances:

- 1984 Out of the Darkness with Don Lange
- 1988 Songs of the Working People
- 1989 The Phil Salazar Band (producer)
- 2004 In The Hills Of California by Greg Brown
- 2008 The White Bathtub by Kenneth Makuakane
- 2009 Kawelona by Keale
- 2009 Imprint by Kapala
- 2011 Kama`alua by Patrick Landeza
- 2012 The Saloon Pilots by The Saloon Pilots
- 2012 The Blinding Speed of Trust by The Piranha Brothers Band
- 2014 Motherland Aina Kaula by Keale
- 2017 Slade Rivers and Friends by Slade Rivers
- 2018 Lei Lehua by Mark Yamanaka
- 2018 Cobblestone by Hanale Bishop
