= Slack-key guitar =

Hawaiian style of tuning and playing

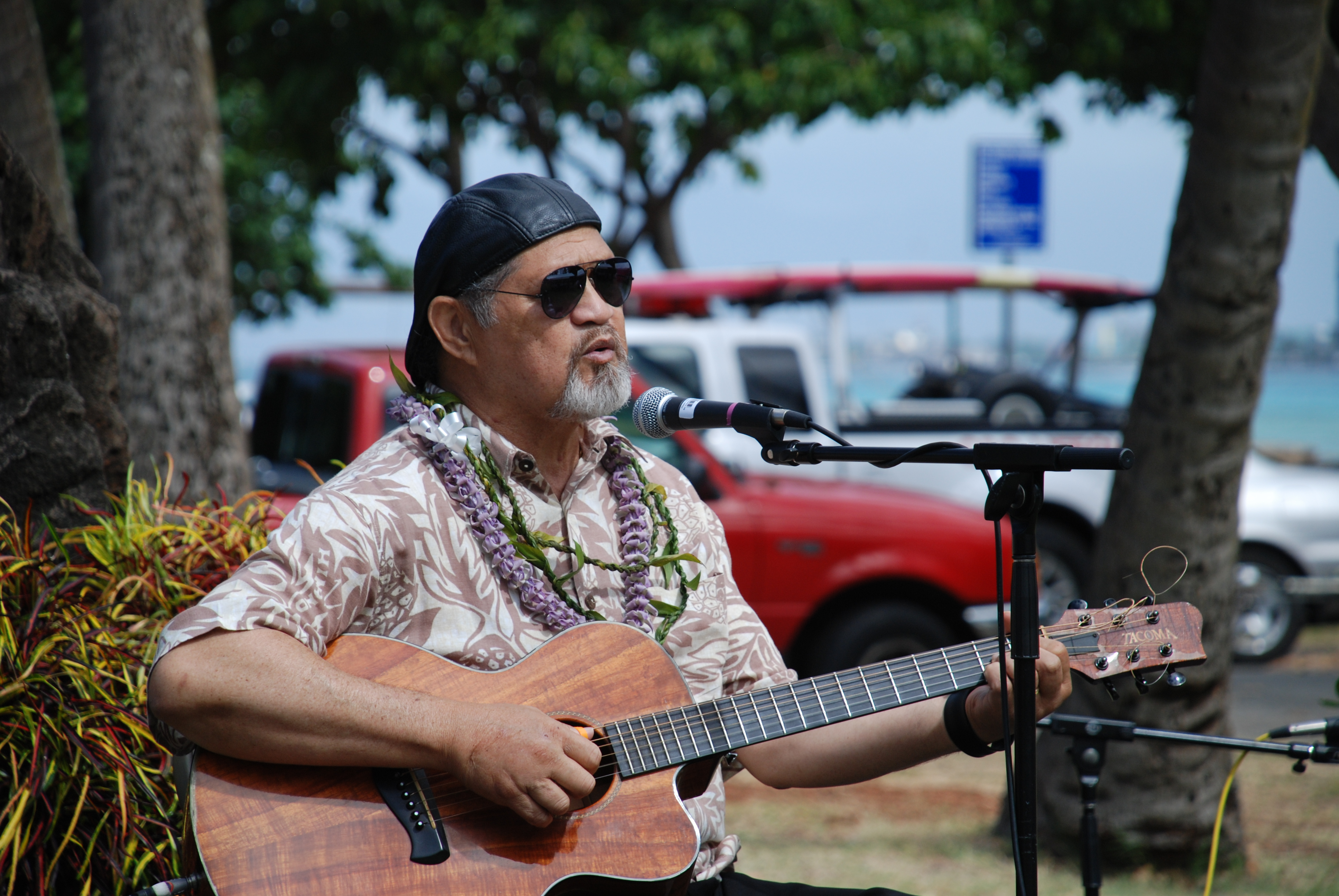
Hawaiian slack-key guitarist Cyril Pahinui in Waikiki, 2012

Slack-key guitar (from Hawaiian kī hōʻalu, which means 'loosen the [tuning] key') is a fingerstyle genre of guitar music that originated in Hawaii. This style of guitar playing, which has been used for centuries, involves altering the standard tuning on a guitar from E-A-D-G-B-E, so that strumming across the open strings will then sound a harmonious chord, typically an open major. This requires altering (usually loosening) or "slacking" certain strings, which is the origin of the term "slack key". The style typically features an alternating-bass pattern, played by the thumb on the lower two or three strings of the guitar, while the melody is played by the fingers on the three or four highest strings. There are as many as fifty tunings that have been used in this style of playing, and tunings were once guarded fiercely and passed down as family secrets. In the early 20th century, the steel guitar and the ukulele gained wide popularity in America, but the slack-key style remained a folk tradition of family entertainment for Hawaiians until about the 1960s and 1970s during the second Hawaiian renaissance.

== History ==
In the oral-history account, the style originated from Mexican cowboys in the early 19th century. These paniolo (a Hawaiianization of españoles, 'Spaniards') provided guitars, taught the Hawaiians the rudiments of playing, allowing the Hawaiians to develop the style on their own. Musicologists and historians suggest that the story is more complicated, but this is the version that is most often offered by Hawaiian musicians. Slack-key guitar adapted to accompany the rhythms of Hawaiian dancing and the harmonic structures of Hawaiian music. The New York Times described the music as "liquid, rippling, and hypnotic". The style of Hawaiian music that was promoted as a matter of national pride under the reign of King David Kalākaua in the late 19th century combined rhythms from traditional dance meters with imported European forms (for example, military marches), and drew its melodies from chant (mele and oli), hula, Christian hymns (hīmeni), and the popular music brought in by the various peoples who came to the Islands: English-speaking North Americans, Mexicans, Portuguese, Filipinos, Puerto Ricans, Tahitians, and Samoans.

The music did not develop a mainland audience during the Hawaiian music craze of the early 20th century, during which Hawaiian music came to be identified outside the Islands with the steel guitar and the ukulele. Slack key remained private and family entertainment, and it was not even recorded until 1946–47, when Gabby Pahinui cut a series of records that brought the tradition into public view. During the 1960s and particularly during the Hawaiian Cultural Renaissance of the 1970s, slack key experienced a surge in popularity and came to be seen as one of the most genuine expressions of Hawaiian spirit, principally thanks to Gabby Pahinui, Atta Isaacs, Leonard Kwan, Sonny Chillingworth, Raymond Kāne, and the more modern styles of younger players such as Keola Beamer, his brother Kapono Beamer, Peter Moon, and Haunani Apoliona. During this period, luthiers such as the Guitar and Lute Workshop in Honolulu specialized in the development and manufacture of guitars custom made to order for slack-key performance.

Many prominent Hawaiʻi-based players got their starts during the Cultural Renaissance years: Cindy Combs, Ledward Kaapana, George Kahumoku, Jr., his brother Moses Kahumoku, Dennis Kamakahi, Ozzie Kotani, three Pahinui brothers (Bla, Cyril, and Martin), the Emerson Brothers and Owana Salazar. These artists, and slack key in general, have become well known outside Hawaiʻi largely through George Winston's Dancing Cat Records record label, which has most often showcased the music in solo settings.

One indication of slack key's increasing visibility beyond the Islands is that the first four winners of the Grammy Award for Best Hawaiian Music Album were slack key collections: Slack Key Guitar, Volume 2 in 2005, Masters of Hawaiian Slack Key Guitar, Volume 1 in 2006, Legends of Hawaiian Slack Key Guitar—Live from Maui and "Treasures of Hawaiian Slack Key Guitar – Live in Concert from Maui." Players from outside Hawaiʻi have also taken up the tradition, for example, Chet Atkins (who included slack key pieces on two of his albums), Yuki Yamauchi (a student of Raymond Kāne's and an advocate of Hawaiian music in Japan), pianist George Winston, and Canadian Jim "Kimo" West (perhaps better known as guitarist with "Weird Al" Yankovic).

== Techniques and tunings ==
George Winston has identified fifty slack-key tunings. Some are only commonly used for a single song, or by particular players. Mike McClellan and George Winston have developed similar schemes that organize the tunings by key and type. The chart below follows their categories and naming conventions. The tunings were often passed down in families from generation to generation, and tunings were often guarded as fiercely as any trade secret.

Kī hōʻalu often uses an alternating-bass pattern, usually played by the thumb on the lower two or three strings of the guitar, while the melody is played on the three or four highest strings, using any number of fingers. Many kī hōʻalu players incorporate various embellishments such as harmonics (chimes), the hammer-on, the pull-off, slides, and damping. Slack key compositions exhibit characteristics from indigenous Hawaiian and imported musical traditions. The vamp or turnaround (a repeated figure, usually at the end of a verse) is descended from the hula tradition, and other harmonic and structural features are descended from hīmeni and from the hula kuʻi encouraged by King David Kalakaua.

Nearly all slack key requires retuning the guitar strings from the standard EADGBE, and this usually means lowering or "slacking" three or more strings. The result is most often a major chord, although it can also be a major seventh chord, a sixth, or (rarely) a minor. There are examples of slack key played in standard tuning, but the overwhelming majority of recorded examples use altered tunings. The most common slack-key tuning, called "taro patch," makes a G major chord. Starting from the standard EADGBE, the high and low E strings are lowered or "slacked" to D and the fifth string from A down to G, so the notes become DGDGBD. As the chart below shows, there are also major-chord tunings based on C, F, and D.

Another important group of tunings, based on major-seventh chords, is called wahine. G wahine, for example, starts with taro patch and lowers the third string from G to F♯, making DGDF♯BD. Wahine tunings have their own characteristic vamps (as in, for example, Raymond Kāne's "Punahele" or Gabby Pahinui's 1946 "Hula Medley") and require fretting one or two strings to form a major chord. A third significant group is Mauna Loa tunings, in which the highest pair of strings are a fifth apart: Gabby Pahinui often played in C Mauna Loa, CGEGAE.

=== Common tunings ===
Common slack-key tunings
Tuning	Notes used					
G Major or Taro Patch	D	G	D	G	B	D
G Wahine	D	G	D	F♯	B	D
D Wahine	D	A	D	F♯	A	C♯
Open D	D	A	D	F♯	A	D
C Major or Atta's C	C	G	E	G	C	E
Mauna Loa	C	G	E	G	A	E
C Wahine or Leonard's C	C	G	D	G	B	D
C 6	C	G	C	G	A	E
Old Mauna Loa	C	G	C	G	A	D
Open C	C	G	C	E	G	C
F Wahine	C	F	C	G	C	E
Open F	C	F	C	F	A	C
Double Slack F	C	F	C	E	A	C

== Notable players ==
- Keola Beamer
- Kealii Blaisdell
- Sonny Chillingworth
- Daniel Ho
- Leland Isaacs Sr.
- Ledward Kaapana
- George Kahumoku, Jr.
- Dennis Kamakahi
- Raymond Kāne
- John Keawe
- Ozzie Kotani
- Leonard Kwan
- Patrick Landeza
- Sonny Lim
- Makana
- Peter Moon
- Alice Namakelua
- Cyril Pahinui
- Gabby Pahinui
- Jeff Peterson
- Fred Punahoa
- Jim "Kimo" West

== See also ==
- Music of Hawaii
