= Patrick Landeza =

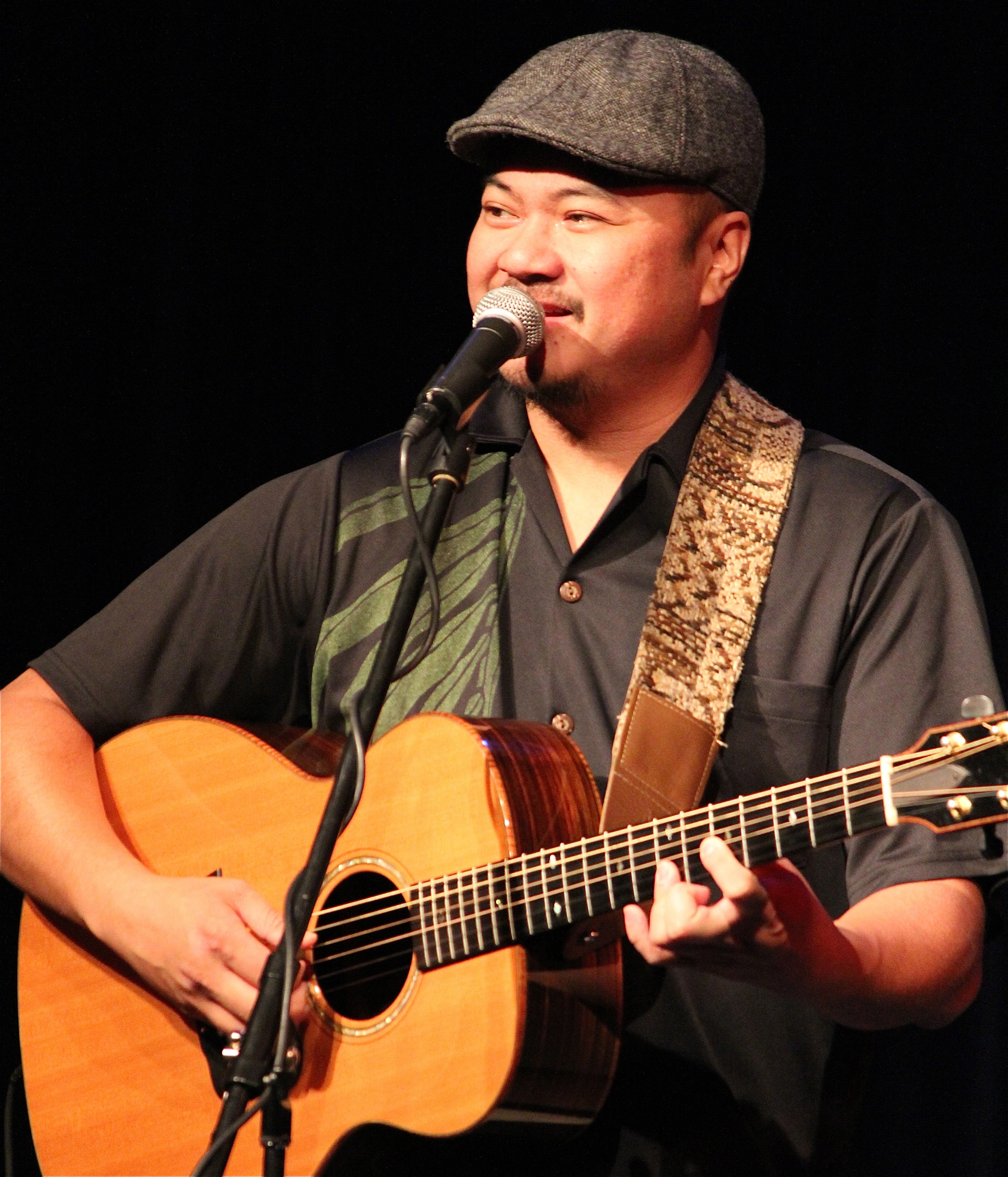
Hawaiian slack key guitarist Patrick Landeza

Patrick Landeza is a contemporary Hawaiian slack key guitarist. He is the first mainland-born Hawaiian to win a Nā Hōkū Hanohano music award. He was born in Berkeley, California on June 23, 1972.

== Early life ==
Patrick Landeza's parents, Danny Landeza Jr. of O'ahu and Frances Kawaipulou Kuakini O'Sullivan of Moloka'i, met and married in California. Danny Landeza was a founder of the Kaimanu Outrigger Canoe Club in San Leandro and was active in community service. Patrick was recognized in 2006 when he became the youngest recipient to date of the Kapalakiko Aloha Spirit Award, created by longtime Bay Area Hawaiian cultural leader Saichi Kawahara.

Patrick Landeza's ethnic background is Hawaiian, Filipino, Chinese, and Irish. At age 15, he was introduced to ki ho'alu, or Hawaiian slack key guitar, by two of his uncles, Clarence and Francis Ahyee. Landeza's early musical education continued under the tutelage of Saichi Kawahara. He began to learn slack key guitar from Hawaiian musicians upon meeting guitarist Raymond Kāne at the Freight and Salvage Coffeehouse in Berkeley.

== Professional career ==
By age 19, Landeza started opening Bay Area concerts for Hawaiian artists like Israel Kamakawiwo'ole, Cecilio & Kapono, Keali'i Reichel and HAPA. During this time, he met composer, musician, and Hawaiian music aficionado George Winston. Winston was the founder of Dancing Cat Records. The label played a crucial role in publicizing slack key guitar to music lovers around the world. Winston was one of Patrick Landeza's early champions, and he encouraged the young guitarist to come to the studio when the slack key masters were recording there. Landeza thus began meeting and learning from established slack key guitarists Sonny Chillingworth (who was close friends with Landeza's grandparents on Molokai), Cyril Pahinui, Martin Pahinui, George Kuo, Pekelo Cosma, and Dennis Kamakahi.

In 2004, Landeza established the Institute of Hawaiian Music and Culture — a traveling workshop where students would learn Hawaiian language, culture, slack key and ukulele. The musical instructors included Cyril Pahinui, Dennis Kamakahi, David Kamakahi, Keoki Kahumoku, and Herb Ohta Jr. Landeza has also been active as a slack key teacher, and he released an instructional DVD, "Hawaiian Slack Key Guitar Made Easy" (Lamb Productions), in 2004. He continues to hold instructional workshops at events around the country, such as the Swannanoa Gathering in North Carolina, the Healdsburg Guitar Festival, and the FAR-West Folk Alliance conference. His lessons were published in Acoustic Guitar Magazine.

In 2012, Landeza's sixth CD, "Slack Key Huaka'i," won the Nā Hōkū Hanohano award for "Slack Key Guitar Album of the Year." The awards, founded in 1978, are Hawaiian music's equivalent of the Grammy Awards. Landeza is the first mainland-based artist to receive the award.

== Books ==
In 2013, Landeza authored a children's book entitled "Danny's Hawaiian Journey," about a mainland-born Hawaiian boy coming to grips with his cultural identity. His autobiography, "From the Island of Berkeley," was published in 2017.

== Business ventures ==
Landeza's Island Poke & Catering

== Discography ==
- "Pu`unaue" - 1998
- "Christmas To Me" - 2001
- "Ma Ka Home" - 2006
- "Ku`u Honua Mele" - 2010
- "Kama`alua" - 2011
- "Slack Key Huaka`i" - 2012
- "I Call Your Name" - 2013
- "Nahe`olu" - 2015
- "Ho`omana`o" - 2016
- "Slack Key Huaka`i Elua" - 2018
- "Far Away" - 2020
