= Leonard Kwan =

Hawaiian musician

Leonard Keala Kwan Sr (1931–2000) was one of the most influential Hawaiian slack-key guitarists to emerge in the period immediately preceding the Hawaiian Cultural Renaissance of the 1970s. He made the first LP of slack key instrumentals, co-wrote the second slack key instruction book, and composed a number of pieces that have become part of the standard repertory. Most players will include Kwan, along with Gabby Pahinui, Sonny Chillingworth, and Atta Isaacs, on a list of the most significant players of the older generation.

== Early life ==
Leonard Keʻala Kwan Sr, was born in Honolulu, Oʻahu in 1931. His mother, Rose Hauʻoli, and her father, Reverend Ambrose Hauʻoli Kau-a, sang traditional Hawaiian music. He learned piano, and was taught to play ukulele and ki ho'alu (traditional slack key guitar styles) by his grandfather and his Uncle Pete Hauʻoli. He played alto saxophone and string bass in the Kalakaua Intermediate School and Farrington High School dance bands, and substituted in Musicians' Union bands during WW II. By the age of sixteen, he was working for Charlie Kaniyama & His Merry Melodeers and filling-in with other small combos.

== Career ==
He made his first single record, "Hawaiian Chimes," for Island Recording Studio in 1957. He was noticed by Margaret Williams, the owner of Tradewinds Records, who recorded Kwan in her living room. The result, in 1958, was Kwan's first Tradewinds single, the original instrumental "ʻOpihi Moemoe," which would become his signature piece and a standard tune in the slack key repertory. In 1960, Tradewinds released an LP of Kwan's playing, titled simply Slack Key, that included six of his own compositions, including "ʻOpihi Moemoe." It was the first album to consist entirely of slack key instrumentals. A later Tradewinds album that is made up of tracks by Kwan and Raymond Kāne bears the same title, so they are often identified by the colors of their covers: the "red album" (Kwan) and the "black and white album" (Kwan and Kāne). Other tracks featuring Kwan as soloist or sideman were released on two early-1960s Tradewinds compilations, Party Songs Hawaiian Style, Volumes 1 and 2.

== Pioneer/Teacher ==
Kwan was also a pioneer in disseminating information about how to play slack key. In his youth, techniques, tunings, and even some songs were not freely exchanged but considered family secrets—one learned from family members and did not share with outsiders. There was some loosening of this attitude in the 1960s, and by the 1970s the old secrecy was rapidly disappearing, and in 1975 Kwan was the first player to publish the tunings he used on a recording, on the sleeve notes to The Old Way, which also included a transcription of the new version of "ʻOpihi Moemoe" that was on the album. In 1980, Kwan and collaborator Dennis Ladd followed Keola Beamer, who in 1973 had published the first how-to book for the tradition (First Method for Hawaiian Slack Key Guitar) by producing Slack Key Instruction Book, which presents ten of Kwan's compositions and arrangements in a range of tunings, in standard notation and tablature, with performance notes and photographs of correct left-hand positions for the chords.

Although Kwan's reputation rests on his guitar playing, for much of his life as a working musician he played string bass in big bands, and this may account for the elements of swing and jazz that flavor his compositions.

== Later years ==
By 1980, ill health forced Kwan to retire from active gigging, but in the late 1980s George Winston persuaded Kwan to record again for his Dancing Cat label. The result was Keʻala's Mele (1995), the first recording to feature Kwan on acoustic guitar and the first to include (on one track) his singing. In 2003, Kwan's Island Recording Studio single and all of his tracks for Tradewinds were reissued on CD as The Legendary Leonard Kwan: The Complete Early Recordings, with discography, tunings, photos, and extensive notes.

Leonard Kwan died on August 14, 2000.
