= George Mukabi =

- Born: George Mukabi; 1930; Kisa, Kenya
- Died: 1963 (aged 32–33); Butsotso, Kenya
- Cause of death: Murdered
- Occupations: Musician; singer; songwriter; guitarist; visual artist
- Children: Johnstone Ouko Mukabi
- Musical career
- Genres: Folk
- Instruments: Vocals; guitar
- Years active: 1948–1963
- Labels: African Gramophone Store; CMS Records

George Mukabi (1930–1963) was a folk musician from Kenya and was one of the first recorded musicians in the country. In his short musical career, he recorded fewer than 30 songs.

He was influenced by recordings of Malawian bands and set out to emulate a fingerpicking style of guitar playing. His style proved popular, influencing musicians such as John Mwale, and created what became Sukuti music, popular among western Kenya's rural people. Some of his songs still receive radio play including "Sengula Nakupenda" and "Mtoto si Nguo", which he composed, but was performed by his son.

His style of music, "omutibo", was popular among urban Africans and played a part in influencing urban musicians such as John Mwale. In 2017, a compilation album of his work, Furaha Wenye Gita, was released by the US-based Mississippi Records, featuring liner notes from his son, Johnstone Ouko Mukabi. Alongside this, a documentary about Mukabi and his influence on Kenyan musicians entitled "A Child is Not a Cloth" was released, featuring Johnstone.

== Death ==
His musical career ended tragically in 1963, after he pursued his second wife who had broken his guitar, dragged her out of her parents' house, and assaulted her.

Mukabi, who had just returned from Nairobi where he had gone for his music business, left his guitar in his second wife's home and went to his first wife's home. The second wife thought Mukabi was about to give all the money he had brought from Nairobi to the first wife, and out of jealousy took Mukabi's guitar and smashed it.

Mukabi heard the commotion and rushed to his second wife's house to find out what was happening. The second wife upon realizing what she had just done, took off to her parents' home as Mukabi gave chase.

Upon arriving at his in-laws' home, he went to the house to look for his wife. When he failed to find her in the sitting room, he entered the bedroom where he found her hiding under her parents' bed. He dragged her out and started beating her.

The father-in-law screamed for help from the villagers still on their farms. They arrived with machetes, jembes, and rungus and attacked Mukabi. Despite sustaining deep cuts, Mukabi still managed to cross the Yala River as he tried to save his life. However, he collapsed just some distance from the banks.

The villagers who were still in hot pursuit caught up with him and finished him off by cutting him into pieces. They then placed the body parts on a mkokoteni and took them to Kakamega Hospital.
