= Makana (musician) =

American musician

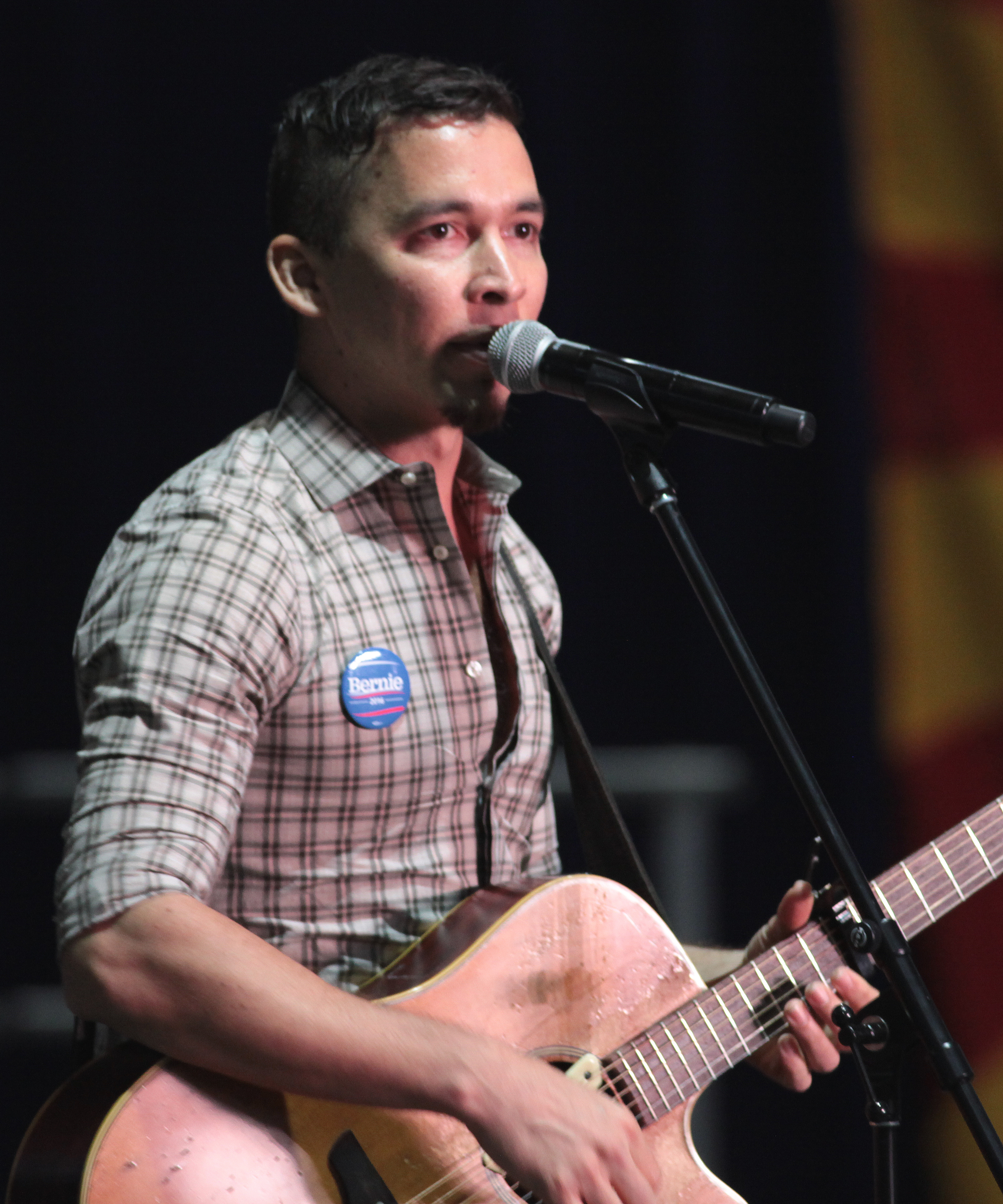
- Makana Performing

Background information
- Born: May 29, 1978 (age 48)
- Genres: Hawaiian, World Music, Folk
- Occupation: Musician
- Instrument: Guitar
- Years active: 1999–present
- Website: makanamusic.com

Makana (from Hawaiian "gift"), born Matthew Swalinkavich, is a slack-key guitar player, singer, and composer. As a child he was a protégé of slack key guitarists Bobby Moderow Jr., Raymond Kane, and Sonny Chillingworth.

== Life ==
Born and raised in Hawaii, his guitar playing has been featured on three Grammy-nominated albums, including the soundtrack of the Academy-Award winning film "The Descendants", starring George Clooney. In 2008, he was second runner up in Guitar Player Magazine's Guitar Superstar competition eliciting praise from judges Steve Vai, Joe Satriani, and Elliot Easton. In 2012, he was awarded a Na Hoku Ki Ho'alu (Slack Key) Legacy Award by the Hawaii Academy of Recording Arts. Makana performed at the White House in 2009. On November 12, 2011, he turned a gig performing at an Asia-Pacific Economic Cooperation dinner in Honolulu, attended by President Barack Obama and the leaders of 18 other nations, into a political protest. He started out his performance by playing traditional Hawaiian music, which then started to veer gently into more controversial territory. When nearing the end of his set, he opened his suit jacket to reveal a T-shirt with the words "Occupy With Aloha" handwritten on it and proceeded to play a song he had recently written called "We Are the Many", a folky protest song expressing Makana's dissatisfaction with the current disproportion of wealth and failure of democracy and his support of the Occupy movement. "I started out very cautiously because my intention was not to disrupt their dinner. My intention was to subliminally convey a message that I felt was paramount to the negotiations," Makana told CNN. "Eventually I got enough courage to go into it for an extended period of time. And I ended my show with the line ‘the bidding of the many not the few.’ I sang it about fifty times in different ways for them to hear", resulting in a song that lasted 45 minutes. Rolling Stone Magazine went on to call "We Are the Many" the "anthem of the Occupy movement."

== Career ==
Makana began singing when he was seven years old, took up 'ukulele at nine and began learning the indigenous art of slack key guitar at eleven. A protégé of slack key guitar legends, including Bobby Moderow Jr. and the late master Uncle Sonny Chillingworth, Makana has dedicated his life to perpetuating as well as evolving the traditional Hawaiian art form of slack key guitar. Makana's playing has garnered praise from such guitar luminaries as Kirk Hammett (Metallica) and Pepe Romero (Spanish Flamenco Master).

His debut album "Makana" was released in 1999; it won the Best World Music Album Award at the Hawaii Music Awards. It was followed by "Koi Au" in 2002 ("A landmark musical statement" – Star Bulletin) and "Ki Ho’alu: Journey of Hawaiian Slack Key" in 2003. Soon thereafter Makana contributed to the Grammy-nominated albums "Hawaiian Slack Key Kings I & II". In 2008, his first all-original release "Different Game" came out and in 2009 he released a 20th anniversary slack key guitar instrumental compilation, "Venus, and the Sky Turns to Clay".

In 2013, Makana released "Ripe" that was funded by fans through the online crowd sourcing platform Kickstarter. It was produced by Ron Nevison and Mitchell Froom, with arrangements by keyboardist, composer, and arranger Jeff Bova.

Makana has toured with or opened for acts such as Jason Mraz, Santana, Elvis Costello, Paul Rodgers, Sting, No Doubt, Jack Johnson, Chris Isaak, John Legend and more.

Makana's song "Family" was featured in the opening episode in Series 4 of Magnum P.I. (2018 TV series), "Island Vibes", first airing on October 1, 2021. It was performed by Makana himself, inside La Mariana Restaurant towards the close of the show.

== Business dispute ==
In 2013, Makana's former manager Tom Bunch filed a lawsuit against Makana for breach of contract and defamation. Bunch reported that he received a letter from Makana's attorney terminating their contract in July 2013.

On October 8, 2021, the court granted summary judgement in Makana's favor.

== Discography ==
- Makana. Honolulu, HI: Moon Room Records. 1999. OCLC 51876182.
- Koi Au (2002)
- Ki Ho'Alu: Journey of Hawaiian Slack Key (2003)
- Different Game (2006)
- The Instrumental World of Makana: Venus and the Sky Turns to Clay (2009)
- Ripe (2013)
- Twenty Five. Hawaii: Makana Music. 2015. OCLC 965391614.
- A Hawai'i Interlude (2020)
- Pulama: Legacies of Hawai'i (2022)
- Make Believe Borders (2024)
