= Dennis Pavao =

Background information
- Born: July 11, 1951; Kalapana, Hawaii United States
- Died: January 19, 2002 (aged 50)
- Genres: Hawaiian music
- Occupation: Musician
- Instruments: Vocals, guitar
- Formerly of: Hui ʻOhana

Dennis Pavao (July 11, 1951 – January 19, 2002), was one of several Hawaiian musicians who, during the 1970s, led a Hawaiian music renaissance, reviving Hawaiian music, especially "ka leo ki'eki'e," or Hawaiian falsetto singing. Along with his cousins, Ledward and Nedward Kaʻapana, Pavao started the group Hui ʻOhana. Hui ʻOhana became the premier falsetto group in Hawaiʻi. After the breakup of Hui ʻOhana, Dennis Pavao moved on to pursue a solo career.

Pavao was born in Kalapana on the Big Island in Hawaii. Jerry Kunimoto, one of Dennis' close longtime friends once said, "Dennis’ recordings over three decades will be sung for generations; he’s one of those performers. If our lives can be measured by the number of people we can touch in a positive way, then Dennis is in a place we all aspire to." He died from a brain aneurysm on January 19, 2002, at the age of fifty.

== Nā Hōkū Hanohano ==
Dennis won several different Nā Hōkū Hanohano, meaning the distinguished/glorious stars, awards.

- His 1989 album, Hawaiian Soul, won the Nā Hōkū Hanohano award for traditional Hawaiian album of the year.
- In 1987, his album Ka Leo Kiʻekiʻe, meaning falsetto voice, won him the top male vocalist of the year award.
- In 1993, he received a Nā Hōkū Hanohano award for his album Nā Mele Henoheno.

== Albums ==
- Ka Leo Kiʻekiʻe - 1986
- Hawaiian Soul - 1989
- Na Mele Henoheno - 1992
- All Hawaiʻi Stand Together - 1994
- Wale Nō - 1995
- Sweet Leilani - 1996
- Keiki Kupuna - 2004 (The songs on this album were recorded just weeks prior to his death.)
- Golden Voice of Hawaiʻi, Vol 1 - 2004 (Includes never released Dennis Pavao recordings as well as some re-mixed and re-mastered recordings that his producer, Trav Duro, Jr. put together after his death.)
