= Ozzie Kotani =

Ozzie Kotani is a slack-key guitar player, teacher, arranger, solo performer and accompanist.

Kotani was born in 1956 in Honolulu, Hawaii in the neighborhood of Pauoa. He learned how to play the 'ukulele in fourth grade, but his interest in kī hō‘alu, or Hawaiian slack key guitar, was sparked in high school when he heard Keola Beamer on the radio.

In 1975, Kotani enrolled in Peter Medeiros' slack key guitar class at the University of Hawaii Continuing Education program. In 1976, Kotani began to study privately with slack key legend Sonny Chillingworth. Kotani returned to the University of Hawai'i program in 1986 to teach and pass on his knowledge of the Hawaiian slack key style to others.

Kotani recorded his first album, Classical Slack, in 1988. Kotani followed up his debut with Kani Kī hō‘alu in 1995, To Honor a Queen: The Music of Lili'uokalani in 2002, Paka Ua (Raindrops) in 2005, and Hō'ihi (Respect) in 2008.

Teaming with Dennis Ladd in 2000, Kotani published his first instruction book on slack key guitar titled Guitar Playing Hawaiian Style: Kī Hō‘alu, An Instrumental Method For Slack Key Volume One. He followed up in 2007 with an instructional DVD titled Guitar Playing Hawaiian Style with Ozzie Kotani: Kī Hō‘alu Vol. 1 and in 2009 with Guitar Playing Hawaiian Style with Ozzie Kotani: Kī Hō‘alu Vol. 2.

Kotani is known for his use of the nylon string guitar, a vocalizing approach to ballads, his use of atypical chord progressions, rolls played with the thumb and three fingers and a stand-up bass-type sound on the low strings on the first and third beats of the measure.

Ozzie also taught private lessons during the 2000s and worked at the Bishop Museum. For Steel String guitars, Ozzie uses a vintage Martin, and a Presentation series Taylor guitar.
