= John Keawe =

American musician

John Keawe is a Hawaiian musician and slack key guitar player from Hawi in the North Kohala district of the Big Island of Hawaii. He's most known for his song "Puuanahulu", but also for "Hawaii Island.. Is My Home", "Keiki Slack Key", "Waimanalo Blues", "Beautiful Hula Dancer", "Until Then", and "Aina Kahiko".

He has toured throughout Hawaii and the Mainland U.S. and regularly performs on the Big Island. Keawe has released a series of albums on his Homestead Records Label, and can also be heard on the Grammy Winning album "Slack Key Guitar Volume 2" available on Palm Records.
