= Ledward Kaapana =

American musician (born 1948)

- Born: August 25, 1948 (age 78); Kalapana, Hawaii
- Occupation: Musician
- Instrument: String Instruments
- Label: Dancing Cat Records
- Formerly of: Hui Ohana, Ikona
- Website: ledkaapana.com

Ledward Kaapana (born August 25, 1948) is a Hawaiian musician, best known for playing in the slack key guitar style. He also plays steel guitar, ukulele, autoharp, and bass guitar, and is a baritone and falsetto vocalist.

In 2011, he received a National Heritage Fellowship, the United States government's highest honor in the folk and traditional arts. He received Na Hoku Hanohano Awards from the Hawai'i Academy of Recording Arts (HARA), and has been nominated for Grammy Awards. In 2024, Kaapana was inducted into the Hawaiian Music Hall of Fame.

== Early life ==
Born on August 25, 1948, Led grew up in a musical family living in the small black sand bay village of Kalapana (mostly destroyed by the 1986 volcanic eruption of Kilauea), where he states there were few distractions. "We didn't have electricity, not television, not even much radio, so we entertained ourselves. You could go to any house and everybody was playing music." He was taught by his mother, Tina, and his uncle, the rarely recorded slack-key master Fred Punahoa.

== Professional career ==
In his teens, Kaapana formed the musical group Hui 'Ohana (means "Family Group"), with his twin brother, Nedward Kaapana, and his cousin, falsetto-great Dennis Pavao. Hui 'Ohana released fourteen albums, each of which was a commercial and critical success. Kaapana left the group eventually, and then released six albums as the leader of another trio, I Kona, and performed with the Pahinui Brothers, 'Aunty' Genoa Keawe, David Chun, Barney Isaacs, and Uncle Joe Keawe.

His first solo album, Lima Wela (means "Hot Hands"), was released in 1983; the album won the Na Hoku Hanohano (means "Honored Stars") Award for "Instrumental Album of the Year" in 1984. He released Simply Slack Key in 1988, and Led Live in 1994 on Dancing Cat Records. He has performed and recorded with acoustic lap-steel player Bob Brozman, and released several more albums on the Dancing Cat label from the late 1990s onward. One of the greatest living slack key masters, Ledward has deep roots in the older styles, using only index finger and thumb picks to combine traditional musical phrases, some modern influences, and spontaneous improvisation to create beautiful multipart arrangements that are simultaneously old and new.

Nashville great Chet Atkins was so impressed by Ledward's playing that he paid him the ultimate country music compliment by giving Ledward his guitar. Ledward has played at the Smithsonian Folklife Festival in Washington, D.C., and made many tours of North America; his fans frequently refer to themselves as "Led Heads."

Kaapana ("Kah-ah-pah-nah") spells his name without using the modern ʻokina marking that is used to indicate a glottal stop for the proper pronunciation of certain Hawaiian words. Kaapana has said that his family has always spelled it without an ʻokina and he prefers the traditional spelling (not Kaʻapana.)

== Quotes ==
"Everything you play, every time you play, there's a mood, an energy. If you plug into it, the music just flows. Even in a simple song, there are so many different ways to play the melody, the rhythm, the harmony. It never stops if you stay open to it."

== Awards ==
He is one of the very few Hawaiian recording artists who has received Na Hoku Hanohano Awards from the Hawai'i Academy of Recording Arts (HARA) for work as a member of three different recording entities—as a solo artist, as a member of Ledward Kaapana & I Kona, and as a member of Hui 'Ohana. As of 2010, four of his solo albums have received Grammy Award nominations in the Best Hawaiian Music Album category.

Kaapana is a recipient of the 2011 National Heritage Fellowship awarded by the National Endowment for the Arts, which is the United States government's highest honor in the folk and traditional arts.
