= Alternate bass =

Performance technique in music

Oom-pah played by accordion on C major chord with alternate bass.

In music, alternate bass is a performance technique on many instruments where the bass alternates between two notes, most often the root and the fifth of a triad or chord. The perfect fifth is often, but not always, played below the root, transposed down an octave creating a fourth interval. The alternation between the root note and the fifth scale degree below it creates the characteristic sound of the alternate bass.

On the guitar and bass guitar this is accomplished with the right hand alternating between two or more strings, often the bottom two on the guitar. In the following example in the C major chord C is located on the fifth string while G is located on the adjacent sixth (lowest) string and in the F major chord F is located on the adjacent fourth string:

Carter Family picking with alternate bass within and walking bass, in blue, between C and F major chords.

Alternate bass lines are also used on the double bass in country music, bluegrass music and related genres.

On the Stradella bass system commonly found on accordions, the left-hand bass-note buttons are arranged according to the circle of fifths. The bass button for the fifth is directly above the bass button for the root.

== See also ==
- Accompaniment
