= Cyril Pahinui =

American slack-key guitarist and singer (1950–2018)

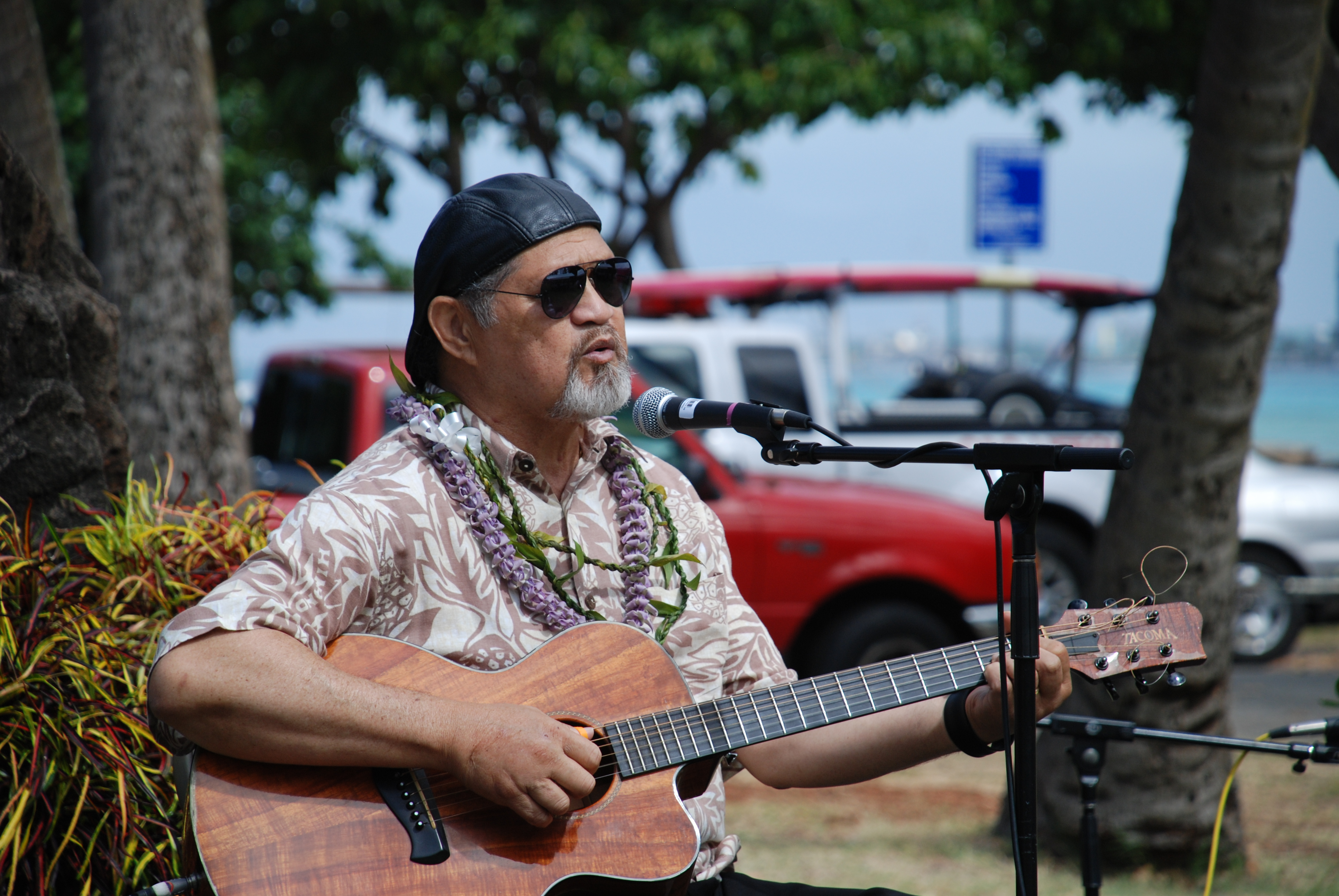
- Pahinui performing at the Waikiki Natatorium War Memorial in 2012

Background information
- Born: April 21, 1950
- Origin: Waimānalo, Hawaii, U.S.
- Died: November 17, 2018 (aged 68)
- Genres: Hawaiian music
- Occupation: Musician
- Instrument: Slack-key guitar
- Years active: 1965–2018
- Label: Dancing Cat Records
- Website: http://www.cyrilpahinui.com/

Cyril Pahinui (April 21, 1950 – November 17, 2018) was an American slack-key guitarist and singer of Hawaiian music.

== Biography ==
He was born in Waimānalo at the foot of the Ko'olau mountains on the Hawai'ian island of Oahu. He was the son of the Hawaiian guitarist (and Hawaiian Music Hall of Fame inductee) Gabby Pahinui. He has contributed to more than 35 Hawaiian musical releases and three Grammy Award-winning compilations of Hawaiian music. His 1994 album 6 & 12 String Slack Key won the Nā Hōkū Hanohano award for Instrumental Album of the Year and contains "No Ke Ano Ahiahi", perhaps the greatest 12-string kī hō'alu (slack key) and vocal recording ever made. His 2007 album He'eia won the Nā Hōkū Hanohano award for Island Music Album of the Year.

In 2013, Pahinui received a fellowship from the Native Arts & Culture Foundation to produce Let's Play Music! Slack Key with Cyril Pahinui & Friends, a program of traditional Hawaiian music developed for PBS Hawaii. In 2014, he received a Nā Hōkū Hanohano Lifetime Achievement Award for perpetuating the craft of slack key music through performance and teaching. In 2017, he was awarded a National Heritage Fellowship by the National Endowment for the Arts, which is the United States government's highest honor in the folk and traditional arts.

== Early career ==
Pahinui began to play the ukulele at the age of 7 and learned how to play guitar from watching his father play with other Hawaiian musicians such as Leland Isaacs Sr. and Sonny Chillingworth. He joined his father's band in the early 1970s, and performed on his father's early recordings for Warner Bros. Records. Cyril and his older brother Bla started a rock band, after which, Cyril Pahinui joined Sam and the Samlins, and continued to sit in with his father at shows. In 1968, Pahinui made his first record with The Sunday Manoa, a loose association of like-minded young people intent on helping perpetuate the classic Hawaiian sound. At the age of 19, his musical career was interrupted when he was drafted to Vietnam, where he served as a sergeant and section chief in the 101st Airborne Division Artillery for two years. In 1975, Pahinui formed The Sandwich Isle Band, one of the first young bands to feature steel guitar and revive the jazz-inflected songs of the 1920s and 1930s. In 1979 he joined the Peter Moon Band, which also included his brother Martin. Throughout the 1980s, he continued to expand his musical horizons, especially in the C major tuning he inherited from Atta Isaacs.

== Death ==
Pahinui had been hospitalized since February 2016 for pneumonia and a collapsed lung. He died on November 17, 2018, at The Queen's Medical Center in Honolulu at the age of 68. He was survived by his wife Chelle, five daughters, two brothers, two sisters, and 19 grandchildren.
