= Sonny Chillingworth =

Musical artist (1932–94)

- Sonny Chillingworth

Background information
- Born: July 14, 1932; Oahu, Hawaii
- Died: August 24, 1994 (aged 62) Honolulu, Hawaii

Edwin Bradfield Liloa Chillingworth Jr., known as Sonny Chillingworth, (July 14, 1932 – August 24, 1994) was an American guitarist and singer. Widely influential in Hawaiian music, he played slack-key guitar and is widely regarded as one of the most influential slack-key guitarists in history.

== Life ==
Chillingworth was born on Oahu in the Territory of Hawaii. He started playing the guitar at age twelve when he was living with his grandfather, Harry Purdy, on Moloka'i. He learned the Hawaiian way by listening, watching and imitating. Sonny, as he was called, loved Hawaiian and Portuguese music.

One day his father brought him a Victrola and some records. One of them was Hi'ilawe by Gabby Pahinui. Chillingworth was inspired. When Chillingworth was fifteen, he visited Honolulu and his mother arranged a meeting with Pahinui. After high school, Chillingworth moved to Honolulu and joined Pahinui, Andy Cummings and others at clubs, lu'aus and all-night jam sessions. Chillingworth was often asked to play his slack-key medleys. Many islanders and tourists enjoyed listening and watching him sing and play his guitar in the Don Ho Shows at the International Market Place in the heart of Waikiki.

In 1954, Chillingworth made his first record, Make'e 'Ailana, with the legendary Vickie Ii Rodrigues. In 1964, Chillingworth released his first album, Waimea Cowboy, which earned a gold record. In the 1970s, Chillingworth began to share his knowledge with younger performers, such as George Kuo, Ozzie Kotani, and Makana, and influenced others through his recordings. Chillingworth helped lead a revival of the slack-key guitar style in the 1980s as one of slack key's elder statesmen. He was committed to Hawaiian music; he also played other styles such as rock-n-roll, R&B, blues, and folk, and his music featured aspects of fado and cachi cachi.

Chillingworth died from cancer on August 24, 1994, in Honolulu at the age of 62.

== See also ==
- Sons of Hawaii
