= Raymond Kāne =

American slack-key guitarist (1925–2008)

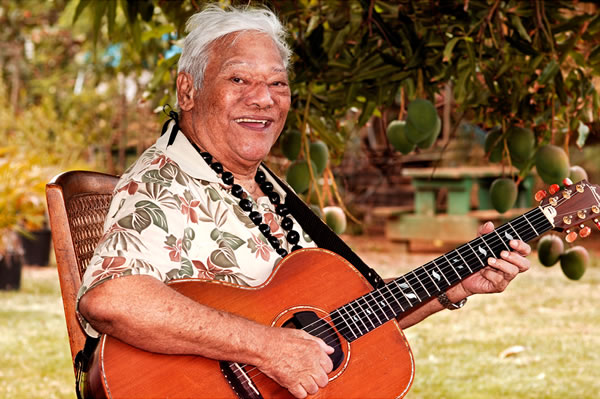
- Kane in 1987

Background information
- Birth name: Raymond Kaleoalohapoinaʻoleohelemanu Kāne
- Born: October 2, 1925; Koloa, Kauaʻi
- Died: February 27, 2008 (aged 82); Honolulu
- Occupation: Musician
- Instrument: Slack-key guitar

Raymond Kaleoalohapoinaʻoleohelemanu (Note: His middle name is pronounced [kəˈlɛjowəˈlohəpoˈwinəˈʔolejoˈhɛlɛˈmɐnu] in Hawaiian, and means "the voice of love that comes and goes like a bird and will never be forgotten".) Kāne (/ˈkɑːneɪ/, Hawaiian: [ˈkaːne]; October 2, 1925 – February 27, 2008), was one of Hawaii's acknowledged masters of the slack-key guitar. Born in Koloa, Kauaʻi, he grew up in Nanakuli on Oʻahu's Waiʻanae Coast where his stepfather worked as a fisherman.

Kāne's style was distinctive and deceptively simple. He played in a number of ki ho'alu tunings always plucking or brushing the strings with only the thumb and index finger of his right hand. He also played hammer-ons and pull-offs in a unique way; his finger moving up and out, instead of down and in, after striking a string. He emphasized that one must play and sing "from the heart". He was never flashy or fast. In Hawaiian, his sound is described as nahenahe (sweet sounding).

He was a recipient of a 1987 National Heritage Fellowship awarded by the National Endowment for the Arts, which is the United States government's highest honor in the folk and traditional arts.

== Discography ==
- Slack Key [the "Black and White Album"] (1958)
- Party Songs, Hawaiian Style, Vol. 2 (1959)
- Nanakuli's Raymond Kane (1974)
- Master of the Slack Key Guitar (1988)
- Punahele (1994)
- Hawaiʻi Aloha (1996)
- Waʻahila (1998)
- Hawaiian Sunset Music, Vol. 1 (1998)
- Cherish the Mele of our Elders (with Elodia Kāne) (1998)
- Maikaʻi No Blues (1999)
- Tribute to Lena Machado (with Elodia Kāne) (1999)
- Holoholo Slack Key (2000)
- He Leo ʻOhana (with Elodia Kāne) (2000)
