= Jules Ah See =

American musician

Background information
- Born: June 19, 1924; Lahaina, Maui
- Died: June 12, 1960 (aged 35)
- Occupation(s): Comedian, musician
- Instrument: Steel Guitar

Jules Keliikuihonua Ah See (June 19, 1924 – June 12, 1960) was an American steel guitarist and comedian. He was born in Lahaina, Maui. At the age of two, he would creep out of his bed at night, in order to listen to the adults playing music. His musical career began with Johnny Almeida, when Jules was in his early teenage years. Among those he played for and with are Pua Almeida, Alfred Apaka and Benny Kalama. He was regularly featured as a steel guitarist on the Hawaii Calls radio program. His performances included imitations of bird and animal sounds created from his guitar, as well as imitating other players such as Sol Hoʻopiʻi and Andy Iona. He is particularly known for his recording of "No Huhu". Considered a role model and one of the best by fellow Hawaiian steel guitarists, he died at age 35 in 1960.

== See also ==
- David "Feet" Rogers
- Gabby Pahinui
- Eddie Kamae
- Genoa Keawe
- Sons of Hawai'i
- Leland "Atta" Isaacs Sr.
- Jerry Byrd
