= David Rogers (Hawaiian musician) =

Hawaiian steel guitarist (1935–1983)

David "Feet" Rogers
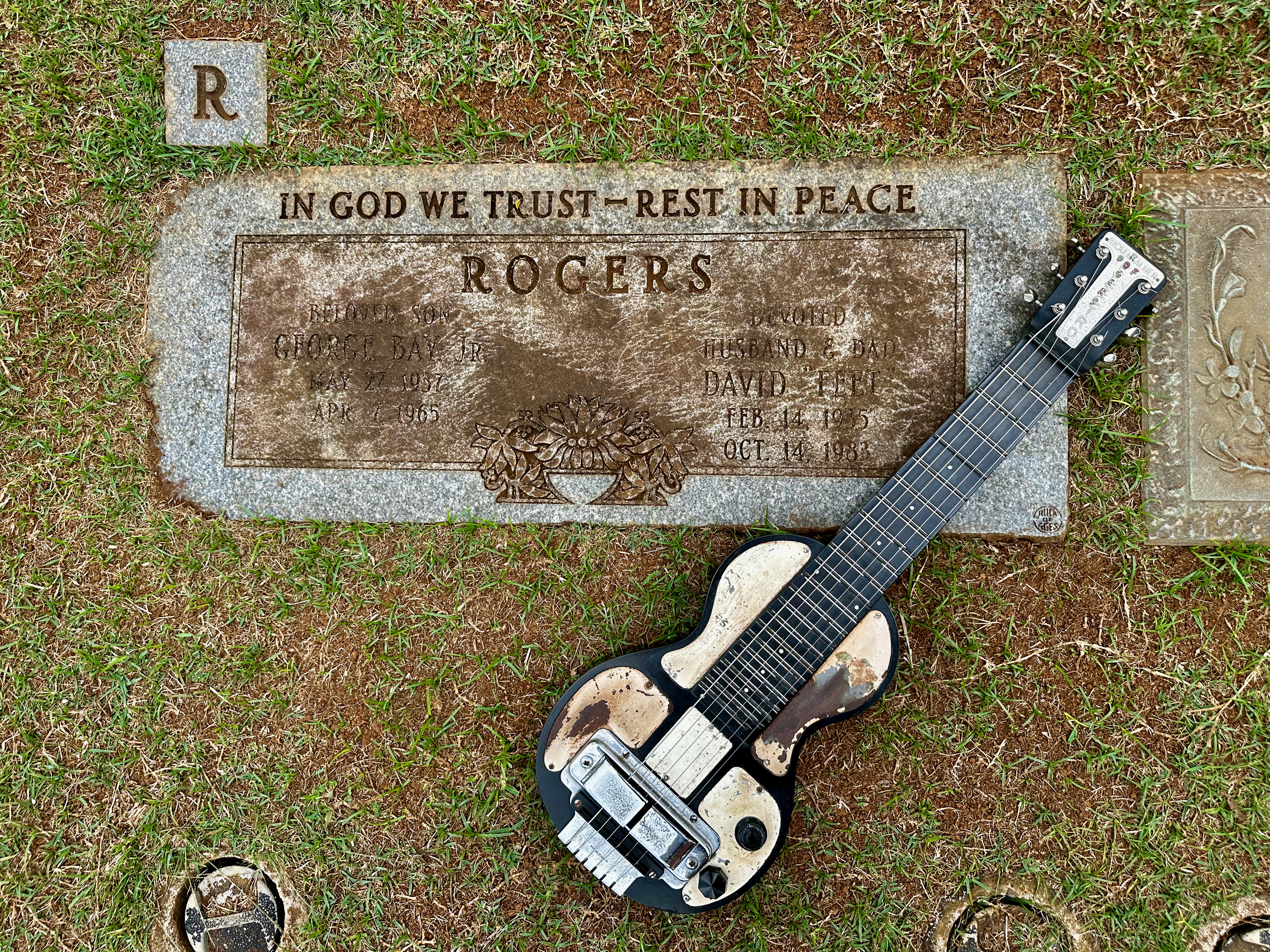

Background information
- Born: David Christopher Kekino Rogers; February 14, 1935; Kalihi, Honolulu, Territory of Hawaii
- Died: October 14, 1983 (aged 48) Hawaii, U.S.
- Genre: Hawaiian music
- Instrument: Steel guitar (Rickenbacher Bakelite)
- Labels: Hula, Panini, Hawaii Sons
- Formerly of: Sons of Hawaii, the Maile Serenaders

David Christopher Kekino "Feet" Rogers (February 14, 1935 – October 14, 1983) was a Hawaiian steel guitarist and an original member of the Sons of Hawaii. He was inducted into the Hawaiian Music Hall of Fame in 2019 and into the Steel Guitar Hall of Fame in 2026.

== Early life ==
Rogers was born in 1935 and grew up in Kalihi, a neighborhood of Honolulu on the island of Oʻahu. He came from a family of steel guitarists: his father, George "Pops" Rogers, was a steel guitarist, and his uncle, Benny Rogers, played steel guitar for Genoa Keawe and for 49th State Records. Rogers studied under David Keliʻi, the steel guitarist for the Hawaii Calls radio program.

== Career ==
Rogers was a founding member of the Sons of Hawaii, the group Eddie Kamae formed around 1960 with slack-key guitarist Gabby Pahinui and bassist Joe Marshall. At the time, Rogers was performing steadily as a first-call musician but was dissatisfied with the music scene. The band's older members visited his father, George Rogers, to ask for his blessing; George approved his son joining the band and gave him his personal steel guitar. Initially calling themselves the Gabby Pahinui Band, the musicians rehearsed at Pahinui's house in Waimānalo, and their first engagement was at the Sandbox, a working-class bar on the edge of Honolulu's industrial district. The group concentrated on traditional "grass roots" Hawaiian music rather than the swing-oriented Waikīkī style followed by many of their contemporaries, and its interest in that repertoire preceded the Hawaiian Renaissance by almost a decade. In rehearsal the four avoided the hapa haole songs heard in Waikīkī in favor of older Hawaiian melodies. Rogers later also played with Moe Keale and Dennis Kamakahi in the group, and he recorded with the Maile Serenaders on the Hula Records album Kani Ka Pila! Let's Play Music! Vol. II (1969). Eddie Kamae credited the steel guitar with enhancing the natural beauty of the group's arrangements and with distinguishing its sound at a time when the instrument had fallen out of favor.

Rogers was the featured steel guitar soloist on the National Geographic Society's 1974 album The Music of Hawaii, part of its Music of the World series, on which he played "Moana Chimes" and "Hilo March". He also appears in the documentary The History of the Sons of Hawaiʻi. Eddie and Myrna Kamae's documentary film Sons of Hawaii, which premiered at the Hawaii International Film Festival on November 9, 2000, discusses Rogers at length. Fellow musicians Fred Lundt and Moe Keale recalled in that film the feeling in Rogers's playing and his approach of filling in around the music rather than overpowering it.

Outside music, Rogers worked as a merchant seaman. Writing in 1976, the steel guitarist Jerry Byrd described him as a retired merchant seaman who said he had travelled around the world "something like 8 or 9 times". Geri Valdriz wrote that Rogers spent many months at sea and, on returning, played with the Sons of Hawaii "as if he had never left".

== Style and instrument ==
Rogers played a six-string Bakelite Rickenbacher steel guitar (the company's original spelling, before it became Rickenbacker). He favored a D major tuning that he associated with his family; Troutman and Ruymar report that he regarded the family's tuning as an inheritance to be preserved. According to Valdriz, the Rogers family played in an E major tuning, which Rogers lowered by a whole step.

His playing was sparse, with single-note melody lines and harmonics ("chimes") rather than large chords. Troutman describes what Rogers brought to the Sons of Hawaii's recordings as "his almost minimalist approach". Ruymar notes him as known for his use of the D tuning and for his "excellence in harmonics". Byrd wrote that Rogers's specialty was "single-string harmonic work" and rated him "the best in the world on harmonic technique", adding that "David's steel guitar is the identifying mark of their pure Hawaiian sound". Valdriz described his "bell-like harmonics and sparse comping" and a "rustic, folk style" rather than a swing- or jazz-influenced approach, and wrote that in the studio Rogers usually recorded a song in a single take.

== Death ==
Rogers died of cancer on October 14, 1983, at the age of 48. He was survived by his wife, three daughters, six grandchildren, his father, three sisters and two brothers.

== Legacy ==
In a 2010 interview with the Honolulu Star-Advertiser, steel guitarist Alan Akaka cited Rogers as an example of the steel guitar's place beyond Waikīkī hapa haole music, saying that "the simplicity of his style fits slack key (and the) Sons of Hawaii sound so perfectly". Valdriz wrote in 2021 that Rogers "continues to inspire steel guitarists seeking to emulate his simple, soulful, Hawaiian style".

At his death, United Press International described Rogers as "one of the world's foremost steel guitarists". Two Sons of Hawaiʻi albums featuring Rogers on steel guitar appear in Honolulu magazine's 2004 list of the 50 greatest Hawaiʻi albums: The Folk Music of Hawaiʻi at No. 15 and Gabby Pahinui with the Sons of Hawaiʻi at No. 24.

At Rogers's posthumous induction into the Steel Guitar Hall of Fame in October 2026, steel guitarist Bobby Ingano played a tribute set to him on Rogers's original Bakelite Rickenbacher steel guitar.

=== Honors ===
- 2019: Inducted into the Hawaiian Music Hall of Fame. The induction ceremony for the class of 2019, planned for November 2020, was postponed because of the COVID-19 pandemic.
- 2026: Inducted posthumously into the Steel Guitar Hall of Fame on October 3, 2026, at the inaugural Austin Steel Guitar Fest in Austin, Texas, alongside Junior Brown and Lucky Oceans; members of his family attended the ceremony.

== Discography ==
Release data from Discogs (a user-generated database); years are of first release.

With the Sons of Hawaii

- Gabby Pahinui with the Sons of Hawaii (Hula, 1960; Rogers credited on the 1978 reissue)
- Music of Old Hawaii (Hula, 1962)
- This Is Eddie Kamae (Hula, 1966)
- The Folk Music of Hawaii (Panini, 1971)
- Eddie Kamae Presents the Sons of Hawaii (Hawaii Sons HS-1001, 1975)
- Eddie Kamae Presents the Sons of Hawaii (Hawaii Sons HS-2002, 1976)
- Eddie Kamae Presents the Sons of Hawaii (Hawaii Sons HS-3003, 1977)
- Hoʻomau (Hawaii Sons, 1979)
- Grassroots Music (Hawaii Sons, 1980)

With the Maile Serenaders

- Kani Ka Pila! Let's Play Music! Vol. II (Hula, 1969; later reissued as Hawaii's Favorite Slack Key & Steel Guitar Instrumentals, Vol. II)

Compilation appearances

- The Music of Hawaii (National Geographic Society, 1974) – "Moana Chimes", "Hilo March"

== See also ==
- Jules Ah See
- Alfred Apaka
- Leland "Atta" Isaacs Sr.
- Jerry Byrd
- Sol Hoʻopiʻi
- Pua Almeida
