= Alfred Apaka =

Background information
- Born: Alfred Aholo Apaka Jr. March 19, 1919; Honolulu, Hawaii
- Died: January 30, 1960 (aged 40) Honolulu, Hawaii, US
- Genres: Hawaiian; Traditional pop Hapa haole music Standards
- Occupation: Singer
- Instruments: Voice, Baritone
- Years active: 1938–1960
- Labels: Decca, Bell Records, Aloha Records, Capitol, Hawaiian Village, ABC-Paramount
- Formerly of: Hawaii Calls; Benny Kalama; Sonny Burke; Rosalie Stephenson

Alfred Aholo Apaka, Jr. (March 19, 1919 – January 30, 1960) was a Hawaiian singer whose romantic baritone voice was closely identified with Hawaii between the late 1940s and the early 1960s. Alfred Apaka was arguably the foremost interpreter of Hapa haole music, which melded Hawaiian music with traditional pop arrangements and English lyrics to convey Polynesian imagery and themes.

== Early life and education ==
Alfred Apaka was born in Honolulu, Hawaii to vocalist Alfred Aholo Apaka, Sr. He was of Chinese, Portuguese, and Hawaiian ancestry. He was a great-grandson of Luther Aholo and grandnephew of Lydia Kaʻonohiponiponiokalani Aholo. Alfred was a graduate of President Theodore Roosevelt High School where he was an athlete and ROTC cadet captain. The family lived for a short time on Molokai but returned to Oahu.

== Career ==
A 1938 Royal Hawaiian Hotel engagement with Don McDiarmid was Apaka's first professional performance, followed by an engagement with Ray Kinney, and a tour of the mainland. Apaka's band played up and down the Pacific coast of the United States 1946-1949. In 1951, Apaka became established at the Moana Hotel in Waikiki.

Joe Glaser, Louis Armstrong's manager, and Jay Faggen signed on as his talent agents and Apaka was groomed to become a mainstream crooner competing with the likes of Bing Crosby. He joined Crosby's label, Decca Records, in 1950. Bob Hope first saw Apaka performing at a luau at Don the Beachcomber's in Waikiki in 1952. Apaka performed on many Hope and Crosby radio and television broadcasts as well as two appearances on The Ed Sullivan Show in 1957. One month prior to his death, Apaka paid a visit to NBC in Los Angeles for a guest spot on The Dinah Shore Chevy Show on December 6, 1959.

When Henry J. Kaiser built his Hawaiian Village, he specifically created its Tapa Showroom exclusively for Alfred Apaka. It was a running gag that Kaiser so loved Apaka as his own son that he planned to buy the island of Molokai and rename it "Apaka Island". Kaiser established Hawaiian Village Records, supposedly to record many local talents, but initially only naming the first Christmas release of an Apaka package.

Apaka was a regular on the popular syndicated radio program Hawaii Calls, produced by Webley Edwards. The radio program was heard around the world and helped to propel Apaka's career worldwide.

The Decca Records release "The Best of Alfred Apaka" noted the following information in the album's liner notes:

"Alfred Aloha Apaka (1919–1960) was one of the influential performers in the history of Hawaii's popular music. Although he recorded for less than a decade, Apaka set the standards for modern Hawaiian music with his joyful, baritone vocals and highly entertaining performances. In his book, Hawaiian Music and Musicians, George Kanahele wrote that Apaka was "the possessor of one of the most remarkable voices to come out of Hawaii. A natural, untrained, voice, it was strong, masculine and agile.....a delicate instrument that could range from B flat to E in pianissimo." Apaka inherited his musical skills from his great aunt, Lydia Ahola, the [hānai] daughter of Queen Lilioukalani. In an interview with The Honolulu Sun Bulletin, Apaka's son, Jeff, who also became an entertainer, said, "I like to think that Dad's musical training came in a direct line from the queen." During the 1940s, Apaka performed with several orchestras including Don McDiamond's Royal Hawaiian Hotel house band and Ray Kenney's band in New York. Overheard by Bob Hope while singing at a luau in Honolulu, Apaka became a regular guest on Hope's radio and television shows. Although many predicted that he would become a successful mainstream vocalist, Apaka took a different route when he convinced multimillionaire Henry Kaiser to build a hotel, The Hawaiian Village, that included a showroom where he starred in his own extravagant revue. Apaka's energetic performances soon made the hotel an essential tourist attraction, and his popularity continued to grow. Plans for a nationally broadcast television special were finalized in February 1960. A few days later, however, Apaka suffered a fatal heart attack while playing hand ball."

== Death ==
Alfred Apaka died suddenly of a heart attack in 1960, aged 40, while playing paddle tennis at a Honolulu YMCA. He was buried with a microphone in his hand, and his final resting place is at Diamond Head Memorial Park.

== Awards and recognition ==
- 1995: Hawaiian Music Hall of Fame
- 1997: Hawai'i Academy of Recording Arts Lifetime Achievement Award
- 1997: Alfred Apaka statue, by artist Kim Duffett, Hilton Hawaiian Village
- 2009: Hawaii Hospitality Hall of Fame

== See also ==
- Jules Ah See
- Gabby Pahinui
- Eddie Kamae
- Genoa Keawe
- Sons of Hawai'i
- Leland "Atta" Isaacs Sr.
- Jerry Byrd
