= Moe Keale =

Background information
- Born: Wilfrid Nalani Keale; December 3, 1939; Niʻihau, Territory of Hawaiʻi, U.S.
- Died: April 15, 2002 (aged 62) Honolulu, Hawaiʻi, U.S.
- Occupation: Live performer
- Instrument: ʻUkulele
- Years active: 1958–2002
- Label: Panini
- Formerly of: Moe Keale & Anuenue, Eddie Kamae's Sons Of Hawaiʻi

Wilfred Nalani "Moe" Keale (December 3, 1939 – April 15, 2002) was an American musician of Hawaiian music, a ʻukulele virtuoso, and an actor. He was the uncle and major musical influence of Israel Kamakawiwoʻole.

He died from a heart attack on April 15, 2002, aged 62.

== Early life ==
He was one of the few persons born in the 20th century to have full Hawaiian ancestry. His father was a kahuna. Moe Keale was born on the island of Niʻihau, but raised on Oʻahu. He was shaped by the ancestral customs and values of his birthplace, learning to play the ʻukulele at the age of four. Conversations in his Niʻihau family home were in Hawaiian, and songs were passed from generation to generation. He would later fondly recall his summers on Niʻihau, where stress was not part of the lifestyle. "I figured that heaven must be something like Niʻihau," he said.

== Career ==
A native of Hawaiʻi, he primarily had roles in movies and TV series that took place in the islands, including many appearances on Hawaii Five-O, where he had a recurring part as Truck Kealoha in the show's final season. He also appeared as Officer O'Shaughnessy on the Hawaiian-based NBC sitcom, The Brian Keith Show.

He was a beachboy, musician and singer, part-time electrician, and radio deejay, as well as an actor. His first paid musical gig with his group the Four K's was at the Waikīkī Tavern circa 1958, followed by the Tropical Club in Kailua-Kona. In 1964, he worked with the Puka Puka Otea Tahitian Show at Queen's Surf. He was recruited for a New York city gig when he was seen at a beach doing high dives off a simulated waterfall. His most noted role as Truck on Hawaii Five-O came as a result of his working as an electrician on the set.

Keale and Eddie Kamae struck up a musical partnership that led to Moe becoming part of the Sons of Hawaiʻi in 1969, and he remained with the group until 1977. He then went on to make three solo albums South Sea Island Magic, Aloha Is A Part of Me, A Part of You, and Imagine. He was a DJ on KCCN in the 1980s.

From 1984 onward, he and his band played two evenings a week poolside at the Sheraton Waikīkī.

At the time of his death, he was a hands-on co-owner of the Lomi Shop's Keiki Waʻa at the Hyatt Regency Waikīkī Resort and Spa at Windward Mall. The Lomi Shop promoted the art of healing through lomilomi massage.

Moe had a near-fatal heart attack in April 2001 and received a pacemaker implant. He used his extension on life to raise $260,000 for the American Heart Association, in order to have portable defibrillators strategically positioned throughout the state of Hawaii.

He died on April 15, 2002, from a heart attack, aged 62.

== Recognition ==
In 2003, the Hawaiʻi Academy of Recording Arts instituted the Moe Keale "Aloha Is" Award in its Na Hoku Hanohano Awards.

== Discography ==
- Hawaii's Treasure: Uncle Moe Keale Live in Waikiki CD 0888 (Booklines)
- South Sea Island Magic (2000) CD 2059 (Mountain Apple)
- Imagine (1996) CD 1005 (Ord)
- Aloha Is a Part of Me (1995) CD 6426 (Surfside)

== Film and Television work ==
- The Brian Keith Show (1972, TV Series) - Officer O'Shaugnessy
- Sanford and Son (1976, TV Series) - Davis' Thug
- Danger in Paradise (1977, TV Movie) - Garfield
- Big Hawaii (1977, TV Series) - Garfield Kalahani
- Stickin' Together (1978) - Big Ben Kalkini
- The Islander (1978, TV Movie) - Henchman
- Pearl (1978, TV Mini-Series) - Sergeant
- The MacKenzies of Paradise Cove (1979, TV Series) - Big Ben Kalikini
- The Paradise Connection (1979) - Driver
- Hawaii Five-O (1971–1980, TV Series) - Joe Moala, Det. Truck Kealoha
- M Station: Hawaii (1980) - Truck Kealoha
- Charlie's Angels (1980, TV Series) - Chin
- Hawaiian Heat (1984, TV Movie) - Jinbo
- Gidget's Summer Reunion (1985, TV Movie) - Bob the Driver
- Blood and Orchids (1986, TV Movie) - Roy Manakula
- Magnum, P.I. (1981–1987, TV Series) - Mortie the car rental dealer / Granville / Kaholo
- Picture Bride (1994) - Hawaiian fisherman
- Hawaii Five-O (1997, TV Movie) - Truck (final film role)

== See also ==
- Gabby Pahinui
- Eddie Kamae
- David "Feet" Rogers
- Genoa Keawe
- Sons of Hawai'i
- Leland "Atta" Isaacs Sr.
