= Alan Akaka =

Hawaiian steel guitarist and educator

- Born: 1956 (age 68–69)
- Origin: Hawaii
- Occupation: Educator
- Instrument: Steel guitar

Alan Akaka (born 1956) is a Hawaiian steel guitarist and educator. The son of former congressman and senator Daniel Akaka, he has taught at several schools and is in charge of the Hawaiian music school Ke Kula Mele. In 2014 he successfully led a petition to prevent the ukulele from being named the official state musical instrument, arguing that the steel guitar was more reflective of Hawaiian tradition.

== Biography ==
Alan Akaka was born in 1956 to Daniel Akaka, who was to become representative of Hawaii to the United States House of Representatives and United States Senate. He played clarinet in the high school band at Kamehameha Schools. Akaka was inspired to play steel guitar when he was exposed to the instrument during the Hawaiian renaissance of the early 1970s. Of particular importance was an album by the Sons of Hawaii. Attempting to imitate the sounds he heard, he requisitioned the Martin guitar belonging to his father, tuned it to slack-key, and used the barrel of his clarinet as a slide across the strings. His father, explaining that Akaka was playing steel guitar, continued to encourage his musical endeavors. Akaka graduated from the University of Hawaii with a degree in Music Education. From 1979 until 1985 he worked with as a performer at the Royal Hawaiian Hotel in conjunction with Jerry Byrd, Tihati's Royal Hawaiian Troupe, and the Leina'ala Simerson Serenaders. He also performed at the Helekulani Hotel with Sonny Kamahele. He has taught at the Kamehameha Schools (including as bandmaster), Saint Louis School, Kahuku High School, and at the University of Hawaii.

== Motivation ==
Encouraged by an uncle, Akaka began taking lessons in 1973 from Jerry Byrd, who had recently arrived in Hawaii. Another important influence to Akaka was Merle Kekuku (Joseph Kekuku's nephew) who instructed him to master a single tuning. He began performing with Genoa Keawe on a stand-in basis, and eventually became her primary steel guitarist.

== Position ==
When Jerry Byrd retired in 1991, Akaka assumed leadership of the Steel Guitar Ho'olaule'a. In 1993, he became president of the Hawaiian Steel Guitar Association. In 2014, Akaka led a successful petition to deny the naming of the ukulele as the official State musical instrument, as he felt the steel guitar was the true native born instrument of Hawaii. He is in charge of a Hawaiian music school, Ke Kula Mele.

== See also ==
- Cyril Pahinui
- Jules Ah See
- Genoa Keawe
- David "Feet" Rogers
