= Dennis Kamakahi =

Hawaiian musician (1953–2014)

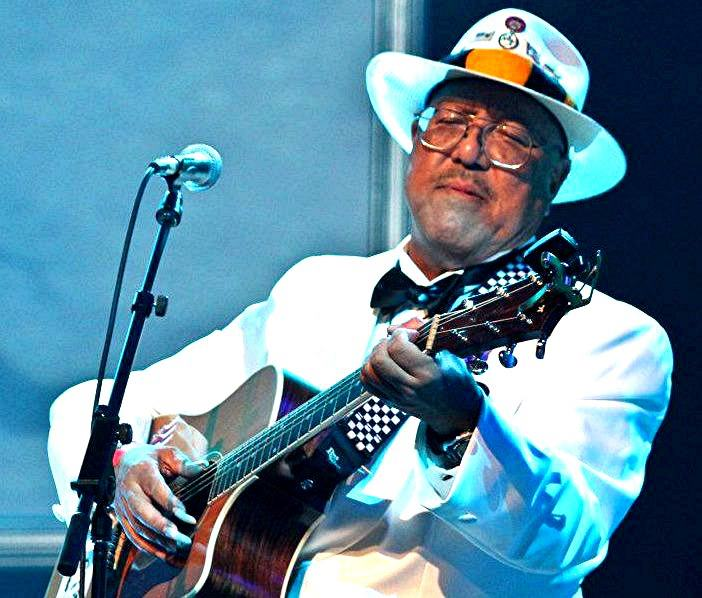
- Rev. Dennis Kamakahi performs at the 2012 Na Hoku Hanohano Awards on 27 May.
- Born: March 31, 1953; Honolulu, Hawaii
- Died: April 28, 2014 (aged 61); Honolulu, Hawaii
- Known for: Slack key guitarist, recording artist, music composer

Dennis David Kahekilimamaoikalanikeha Kamakahi (March 31, 1953 – April 28, 2014) was a Hawaiian slack key guitarist, recording artist, music composer, and Christian minister. He was a three-time Grammy Award winner, and in 2009 he was inducted into the Hawaiian Music Hall of Fame.

== Professional music career ==
In 1972, Kamakahi became a member of a Hawaiian music group known as Na Leo O Nu'uanu. His first recording with Na Leo O Nu'uanu was the album Ia 'Oe E Ka La Volume 1, released on the Nakahili Productions label with Palani Vaughan. It was the first of a series of albums based on the life of King David Kalakaua. The second recording of the group, released 1974, was recorded live at a music festival in Waimea, Hawaii, called The Waimea Music Festival. The festival featured many of Hawaii's popular entertainers of the time including Gabby Pahinui, Fred Punahoa, The Sunday Manoa and Genoa Keawe.

It was his tenure with Eddie Kamae and the Sons of Hawaii (1974–95) after replacing Gabby Pahinui that led Kamakahi to become one of Hawaii's most prolific songwriters in the Hawaiian language, composing around 500 songs. In 1974, Kamakahi recorded with the Sons of Hawaii for the National Geographic Society's Music of the World series. This was the beginning of seven albums under the Hawaii Sons label and the recording of many of Kamakahi's music compositions. In 1978 he became a member of the American Society of Composers, Authors, and Publishers and created Naukilo Publishing Company, a music publishing firm.

From 1988 until 2004, he continued to work with Kamae, recording soundtracks for several Hawaiian documentary films: LI‘A: The Legacy of a Hawaiian Man, Listen to the Forest, The Hawaiian Way: The Art and Tradition of Slack Key Music, Words, Earth & Aloha: The Source of Hawaiian Music, Luther Kahekili Makekau: A One Kine Hawaiian Man, Hawaiian Voices: Bridging Past to Present, Sons of Hawai'i: A Sound, A Band, A Legend, Hawaiian Son: The Life and Music of Eddie Kamae and Keepers of the Flame: The Legacy of Three Hawaiian Women, all produced by Eddie and Myrna Kamae as part of the Hawaiian Legacy Foundation series.

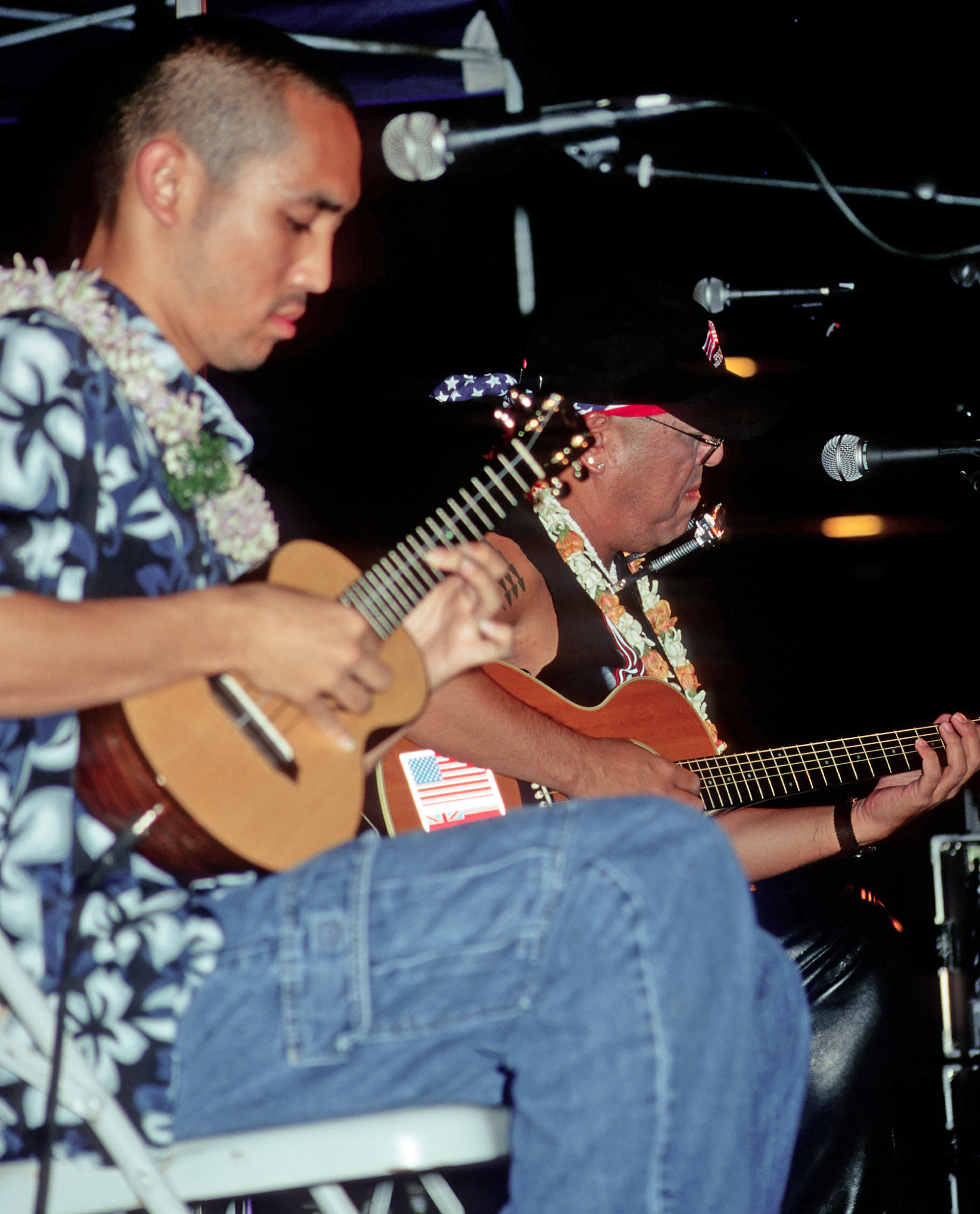
Dennis Kamakahi and son David (left) in concert at Keauhou Shopping Center, HI, in October 2001

Kamakahi launched his solo career in 1996, releasing his first slack key guitar CD Pua'ena, (Glow Brightly) co-produced by Howard Johnston and pianist George Winston, under Dancing Cat Records. In 1998 he released his second slack key guitar CD for Dancing Cat Records together with son David Kamakahi on the ukulele. The CD was called ʻOhana (Family). It was soon followed by another Dancing Cat Records release, Hui Aloha (Play Together), featuring both Dennis and David Kamakahi, George Kuo, and Martin Pahinui.

In 2003, under his own recording label, Dennis Kamakahi Productions, he released a second album with son David, The Gift of Music - From Father to Son. The CD included narration between each song to explain its meaning. In 2003, both Kamakahi and David became involved with Disneytoon Studios to provide vocals and instrumentals for the animated film Lilo & Stitch 2: Stitch Has a Glitch (2005) as well as its soundtrack, Disney's Lilo & Stitch Island Favorites. It was also at this time that Kamakahi became a member of the Screen Actors Guild.

Kamakahi produced an album featuring his son in 2004 entitled Pa'ani (Play). The CD was the first solo ukulele effort of David and garnered a Na Hoku Hanohano Award from the Hawaii Academy of Recording Arts for Contemporary Album of the Year in 2005. At that same Award Ceremony, Kamakahi was honored with the Na Hoku Hanohano Kiho'alu Award (Slack Key Award) by the Hawaii Academy of Recording Arts.

At the 49th Grammy Awards in Los Angeles, California, on February 11, 2007, Kamakahi received his first Grammy Award for Best Hawaiian Album for the slack key guitar compilation CD Legends of Hawaiian Slack Key Guitar, part of the recorded live concerts at Kapalua, Maui, at the Ritz Carlton Hotel. Kamakahi received his second Grammy in the Hawaiian Music Category in 2008 at the 50th Grammy Awards in Los Angeles for the slack key guitar compilation CD Treasures of Hawaiian Slack Key Guitar, part of the second recorded live concert series at the Napilikai Resort Hotel in Kapalua, Maui. He also joined the Music Teachers National Association that year to continue the teaching and advancement of music composition to students.

Kamakahi was nominated for a third Grammy in 2009 at the 51st Grammy Awards with the slack key compilation CD The Spirit of Hawaiian Slack Key Guitar, a third recorded live series at the Napilikai Resort Hotel in Kapalua, Maui. The CD did not win the award, but Kamakahi did receive his first gold Grammy Nominee medal as a record producer.

Kamakahi was nominated a fourth time for a Grammy Award for his slack key compilation CD The Masters of Hawaiian Slack Key Guitar Volume 2 - Live in Maui and won his third Grammy for Best Hawaiian Music Album at the 52nd Grammy Awards on January 31, 2010.

In 2009, Kamakahi was awarded the Lifetime Achievement Award from the Hawaii Academy of Recording Arts as a member of the Sons of Hawaii and inducted into the Hawaiian Music Hall Of Fame. Until his death, Kamakahi continued to perform in live concerts in Hawaii and abroad, and teach Hawaiian slack key guitar, the history of Hawaiian songs and their meaning, and songwriting workshops in both Hawaii and the U.S. mainland. He died of lung cancer in 2014.

== Awards and recognitions ==
- 1978 - Nani Awards from the Hawaiian Music Foundation for the best new Hawaiian Song, "Sweet Weuweu".
- 1980 - Na Hoku Hanohano Award from the Hawaii Academy of Recording Arts New Hawaiian Song of the Year: "E Hihiwai"
- 1985 - Frank P. Kernohan Award from the Kamehameha Schools for distinguished achievement in the field of music.
- 1987 - Honolulu City Council Resolution for distinguished achievement in the field of Hawaiian music.
- 1997 - Na Hoku Hanohano Awards - Best Male Vocalist of the Year Nomination from the Hawaii Academy of Recording Arts for the album Pua'ena (Dancing Cat Records).
- 1999 - Na Hoku Hanohano Awards - Best Male Vocalist of the Year Nomination from the (Hawaii Academy of Recording Arts) for the album Ohana (Dancing Cat Records).
- 2001 - Proclamation from the Office of the Mayor, City and County of Honolulu designating August 19, 2001, Dennis Kamakahi Kiho'alu 2001, 19th Annual Slack Key Guitar Festival Day
- 2005 - Na Hoku Hanohano Awards from the Hawaii Academy of Recording Arts - Kiho'alu Award (Slack Key Award)
- 2006 - State Foundation on Culture and Arts Individual Fellowship (State of Hawaii)
- 2006 - Featured artist on two Hawaiian Slack Key CDs, both nominated for the 49th Grammy Awards held on February 11, 2007, in Los Angeles, CA.
- 2007 - Grammy Award winner for Best Hawaiian Album Legends of Hawaiian Slack Key Guitar - Live in Maui.
- 2007 - State of Hawaii House of Representatives Resolution in honor of winning Grammy Award in the Hawaiian Music category.
- 2008 - featured artist on CD Treasures of Hawaiian Slack Key Guitar nominated for the 50th Grammy Awards held February 10, 2008, in Los Angeles, CA.
- 2008 - Grammy Award winner for Best Hawaiian Album, Treasures of Hawaiian Slack Key Guitar - Live in Maui.
- 2009 - Nominated for third Grammy Award for both performer and producer for the slack key guitar album The Spirit of Hawaiian Slack Key Guitar - Live in Maui.
- 2009 - Lifetime Achievement Award from the Hawaii Academy of Recording Arts.
- 2009 - Newly inducted into the Hawaiian Music Hall of Fame with formal induction ceremonies held in May 2010.
- 2009 - Nominated for third Grammy Award on two CDs: The Masters of Hawaiian Slack Key Guitar Vol. 2 and Amy Hanaiali'i's Family and Friends of Hawaii.
- 2009 - Wins third Grammy Award for The Masters of Hawaiian Slack Key Guitar Vol. 2.
- 2010 - Nominated for fourth Grammy Award for the CD Amy Hanaiali'i and the Hawaiian Slack Key Guitar Masters.
- 2011 - Featured on movie soundtrack of George Clooney's film The Descendants.
- 2012 - Wins Slack Key Album of the Year 2012 Award from the Hawaii Academy of Recording Arts for the CD Waimaka Helelei (Aumakua Records).
- 2013 - First Hawaiian musician to donate guitar to the Smithsonian American History Museum.
- 2013 - Wins two Na Hoku Hanohano Awards: DVD of the Year for The Hawaiian Legends and Slack Key Compilation of the Year for Live From the Lana'i Slack Key Festival. Also honored with the Kiho'alu Foundation's Kiho'alu (Slack Key) Award at the 2013 Na Hoku Hanohano Awards.

== Discography ==
- ‘Ia ‘Oe E Ka La Vol. 1 (1973)
- Waimea Music Festival (1974)
- Eddie Kamae presents The Sons of Hawaii HS1001 (1974)
- The Music of Hawaii - The National Geographic Society (1974)
- Eddie Kamae presents The Sons of Hawaii HS2002 (1975)
- Eddie Kamae presents The Sons of Hawaii HS3003 (1976)
- Eddie Kamae presents The Sons of Hawaii HS4004 (1977)
- Christmas Time with Eddie Kamae and the Sons of Hawaii HS5005 (1978)
- Eddie Kamae presents the Sons of Hawaii HS6006 (1979)
- Eddie Kamae presents the Best of the Sons of Hawaii HS7007 (1981)
- Pua’ena (1996)
- ‘Ohana (1998)
- Hui Aloha (1999)
- Crossroads w/Na ‘Oiwi (2001)
- Na ‘Oiwi - The Sequel (2002)
- The Gift of Music - From Father To Son (2003)
- Eddie Kamae and the Sons of Hawaii (2004)
- David Kamakahi - Pa'Ani (2004)
- Lilo & Stitch 2: Stitch Has a Glitch - DVD (2005)
- Lilo & Stitch 2: Stitch Has a Glitch CD (2005)
- Dennis Kamakahi - featured artist on Legends of Hawaiian Slack Key Guitar (2007) (nominated for Grammy Award (2006)
- Dennis and David Kamakahi - featured artists on Hawaiian Slack Key Kings (2007) (nominated for Grammy Award (2006)
- Eddie Kamae and Friends (2006)
- Dennis Kamakahi receives first Grammy Award (Hawaiian Music category) for the slack key guitar CD Legends of Hawaiian Slack Key Guitar - Live in Maui (2007)
- Dennis Kamakahi nominated for Grammy Award (Hawaiian Music category) for the slack key guitar CD Treasures of Hawaiian Slack Key Guitar - Live in Maui (2008)
- Dennis Kamakahi receives second Grammy Award (Hawaiian Music category) for the slack key guitar CD Treasures of Hawaiian Slack Key Guitar - Live in Maui (2008)
- Dennis Kamakahi- featured artist on The Spirit of Hawaiian Slack Key Guitar - Live in Maui (2008)
- Eddie Kamae and the Sons of Hawaii - Yesterday and Today (2008)
- Dennis Kamakahi- featured artist on The Masters of Hawaiian Slack Key Guitar Vol. 2 (2009)
- Dennis Kamakahi - featured artist on Amy Hanaiali'i's CD Friends and Family (2009)
- Rev. Dennis Kamakahi- The Greatest Hits Vol. 1 (2009)
- Eddie Kamae and the Sons of Hawaii - Yesterday and Today Vol. 2 (2009)
- Dennis Kamakahi receives third Grammy Award (Hawaiian Music category) for the slack key guitar CD The Masters of Hawaiian Slack Key Guitar Vol. 2 (2009)
- Dennis Kamakahi records on Amy Hanaiali'i and the Hawaiian Slack Key Masters (2010)
- Dennis Kamakahi featured on movie soundtrack of George Clooney's film The Descendants (2011)
- Dennis Kamakahi and Stephen Inglis - Waimaka Helelei CD (2011)
