= Gilbert Lani Kauhi =

American actor (1937–2004)

- Born: Gilbert Francis Lani Damian Kauhi; October 17, 1937; Hilo, Big Island of Hawaii, Territory of Hawaii
- Died: May 3, 2004 (aged 66); Hilo, Hawaii, U.S.
- Other name: Zulu/Zoulou
- Occupations: Actor, musician, comedian
- Years active: 1968–1997

Gilbert Francis Lani Damian Kauhi (October 17, 1937 – May 3, 2004), also known by the stage names mononymously as Zulu and Zoulou, was an American actor and comedian. He is remembered largely for his portrayal of Kono Kalakaua on the long-running television program Hawaii Five-O.

== Career ==
Kauhi was born in Hilo on the "Big Island" of Hawaii. He served in the United States Coast Guard. He began his career in Honolulu as a stand-up comedian, mimic, and singer, described by one journalist as "part Godfrey Cambridge, part Zero Mostel". His nightly live show was a popular attraction at C'est Si Bon Supper Club in the Waikiki section of Honolulu before, during, and after his brief television career. Kauhi was an accomplished surfer; he was known in Hawaii by the honorific "Waikiki Beach Boy". In the late 1960s, Kauhi was a member of the band Sons of Hawaii and referred to it as his "schooling in Hawaiian music".

In 1968, Kauhi landed the role of the burly state police detective Kono on Hawaii Five-O. He was fired from the show after four seasons after disagreements with the show's publicist. Zulu would go on to eight more television roles including a reprise role of Kono in the 1997 pilot for the revival series Hawaii Five-O.

After ending his business relationship with his manager, Kauhi discovered that she had registered the name "Zulu" and he could not perform as Zulu without her permission. For the rest of his career he performed as "Zoulou", saying it was the French Tahitian spelling.

== Death ==
Kauhi died in Hilo at the age of 66 from complications due to diabetes. Per his wishes, his ashes were scattered off Waikiki.

== Filmography ==
- Rampage (1963) – guard to the tribal leader
- Hawaii Five-O (1968–1972) (95 episodes) – Kono
- I Sailed to Tahiti with an All Girl Crew (1968) – Jail guard
- The Brian Keith Show (1972–1973) (3 episodes) – Chief Hanamakii/Zulu
- Code Name: Diamond Head (1977) – Zulu
- The Paradise Connection (1979) – Rudy
- Charlie's Angels (1981) – Kono (uncredited)
- Magnum, P.I. (1982) – Hotel Doorman
- Hawaii Five-O (1997 pilot for revival series) – Kono (final film role)
