= Myrtle K. Hilo =

Hawaiian taxicab driver, radio personality, ukulele player and singer

Background information
- Born: Myrtle Keahiʻaihonua Kahea; May 17, 1929; Hauʻula, Oahu, Territory of Hawaii
- Died: October 3, 2009 (aged 80) Honolulu, Oahu, Hawaii
- Occupations: Live performer Taxicab driver
- Instrument: Ukulele
- Years active: 1967–2009
- Labels: Makaha; Lehua; Tropical; 49th State Hawaii
- Spouse: George Hilo Sr.,

Myrtle Keahiʻaihonua Kalanikahea Hilo (May 17, 1929 - October 3, 2009) was a native Hawaiian taxicab driver, radio personality, ʻukulele player and singer. Her signature album The Singing Cab Driver was released in 1967 on Makaha Records. She was born in Hauʻula, Hawaii on the island of O'ahu. In 1998 she received the Lifetime Achievement Award from the Hawai'i Academy of Recording Arts.

== Background and early career ==
Myrtle Keahiʻaihonua Kahea Hilo was born in Hauʻula on the island of O'ahu, in the Territory of Hawaii. She attended McKinley High school, graduating in 1948. She married George Hilo, a heavy equipment operator for the Board of Water Supply. Together they had six children. Hilo worked as a cashier, and a taxicab driver before achieving success in the entertainment business.

According to the online Territorial Airwaves, Hilo briefly sang with the Royal Hawaiian Girls Glee Club. She came under the mentorship of Kumu Hula George Naʻope in the early 1950s when he performed at the Niumalu Hotel (where the Hilton Hawaiian Village now stands). Together with Naʻope, she recorded with John Kameaaloha Almeida on their Tropical Records label, and on the 49th State Hawaii label.

== Commercial success ==
In the late 1960s, she began to make a name for herself in Waikīkī. She accompanied herself on ʻukulele and recorded her first album The Singing Cab Driver on the Makaha Label. Hilo was featured at Sunday entertainment galas in Waikīkī promoted by Kimo Wilder McVay. She had her own bi-weekly live broadcast on KHVH radio, from the Outrigger Reef Hotel, and a Sunday evening live broadcast from the Moana Hotel.

Between 1967 and 1973, Hilo recorded three albums. Her break-out hit "Will You Love Me (When My Carburetor Is Busted)" eventually became a classic, and is believed to be a George Naʻope adaptation of the Benjamin (Bell) Zamberg's '"Carburetor the Automobile Song'" from Yiddish theatre. By the 1970s she was filling in for Kahala Hilton headliner Danny Kaleikini.

Hilo continued driving her taxicab on a full-time basis, sometimes picking up fares after she closed her show at night. Although she took regular fares, she also sometimes accommodated private tours. Travel companies began an arrangement with her for use of her name for United States mainland tours, while booking her as the on-board entertainment.

== Later years ==
After three successive family deaths in 1976, her husband and both her parents, she took a sabbatical from performing and moved to Tacoma, Washington.

She returned to performing in Hawaii in 1987. In 1998, the Hawai'i Academy of Recording Arts presented her with the Lifetime Achievement Award at the Na Hoku Hanohano Awards.

Myrtle K. Hilo died in 2009. Besides her husband, her daughter Healani also preceded her in death. She was survived by four of her children.

== Discography ==
- The Singing Cab Driver (1967) on Makaha Records (album)
- Will You Love Me (When My Carburetor Is Busted) (1967) on Makaha Records (album)
- Mahalo Plenty (1973) Lehua Records

Singles

- "Mauna Loa" (date unknown) with John Kameaaloha Almeida and Joe Keawe's Harmony Hawaiians on 49th State Hawaii
- "Kila Kila O Haleakala" (date unknown) with John Kameaaloha Almeida and Joe Keawe's Harmony Hawaiians on 49th State Hawaii
- "Moana Loa" (date unknown) with Joe Keawe's Harmony Hawaiians on 49th State Hawaii
