= Code Name: Diamond Head =

1977 film by Jeannot Szwarc

- Written by: Paul King
- Directed by: Jeannot Szwarc
- Starring: Roy Thinnes; France Nuyen; Gilbert Lani Kauhi
- Music by: Morton Stevens
- Country of origin: United States
- Original language: English

Production
- Producer: Quinn Martin
- Running time: 74 minutes

Original release
- Release: May 3, 1977

Code Name: Diamond Head is a 1977 American television spy film starring Roy Thinnes as undercover counterintelligence officer Johnny Paul (known by the code name "Diamond Head") whose mission is to stop rogue double agent Sean Donovan from stealing the formula for a new chemical weapon. Originally filmed as a pilot for a new television drama—which was never picked up for series—it was eventually used for The NBC Monday Movie on the U.S. broadcast network NBC.

== Plot ==
Johnny Paul is a flashy gambler and ladies' man living on O'ahu, Hawai'i. In reality, he is agent "Diamond Head" working for a secret US government agency. His mission: stop the theft of a lethal new gas, which has the potential to cause instant death upon contact. The substance was secretly developed by a top battalion of Marines at the request of a Pentagon official named Colonel Millard Butler. However, a double agent had infiltrated the unit, killed Colonel Butler, and assumed his identity. Paul uses his public persona to get close to the double agent, who is known by the pseudonym "Tree". However, once his cover is blown, it's a race against time to stop Tree from selling the secrets to an unnamed foreign power.

== Cast ==
- Roy Thinnes as Johnny Paul / Diamond Head
- France Nuyen as Tso-Tsing
- Gilbert Lani Kauhi as Zulu
- Ward Costello as Captain Macintosh
- Don Knight as H. K. Muldoon
- Ian McShane as Sean Donovan / Tree
- Eric Braeden as Ernest Graeber
- Dennis Patrick as Commander Yarnell
- Alex Henteloff as Dr. Edward Sherman
- Eric Christmas as Father Murphy

== Reception and legacy ==
Kevin Thomas for the Los Angeles Times praised Jeannot Szwarc's direction, calling it "crisp and driving". Conversely, Thomas was critical of Paul King's script, finding it "too trite to succeed as the escapist entertainment intended".

The film was featured in a season six episode (#608) of Mystery Science Theater 3000.

=== Home media ===
The film is currently available only in VHS format. The Mystery Science Theater version was released in DVD format on March 27, 2012 as part of the 23rd box set of the series.
