= 49th State Hawaii record company =

The 49th State Hawaii Record Company is a defunct Hawaiian record label specializing in traditional Hawaiian music. Established in 1948 by George K. Ching, the label was purchased by Cord International in the early 1990s.

== History ==
The 49th State Hawaii Record Company was founded in Honolulu, Hawaii by record store owner George K. Ching in 1948. The label was named in anticipation of Hawaii's eventual attainment of statehood, though Alaska gained statehood eight months before Hawaii, making Hawaii the 50th state. Ching founded the label to answer the growing demand for traditional Hawaiian music in his record store, with the first 49th State recordings released as 78 rpm records made using an acetate record cutting machine in a makeshift studio in Ching's own home. Later, production moved to initial recording on tape before later being pressed in vinyl. To guarantee authenticity in recorded performances, Ching collaborated with Hawaiian composer and musician Johnny Almeida, known as the "Dean of Hawaiian Music". Almeida served as the label's music director. 49th State served as a successor to Bell Records Honolulu, which released Hawaiian music between 1944 and 1950. By 1950, the headquarters for the label had moved from Ching's home to 1121 Bethel St, Honolulu. The company, which has been described as "the first, top, most significant, authentic label of Hawaii", was defunct by 1958.

=== Purchase by Cord International ===
Cord International purchased the rights to The 49th State Hawaii record company and has restored and re-mastered many of the LPs released between 1948 and 1958. According to the May 18, 2015 obituary of Michael Cord:

"In the 1980s, he noticed that many of the important old-time Hawaiian record labels had gone out of business and their releases were out of print. In 1991, [Cord] began leasing the rights to those old recordings and digitally restoring them for reissue. Among the Hawaii record labels Cord brought back to life were Bell, 49th State Hawaii, Mele, Trim, Tradewinds, and Gold Coin."

Another obituary for Michael Cord stated that the 49th State Hawaii Records label was among Cord's first acquisitions. The purchase was made in order to restore, remaster, and re-release the recordings, which by that point were out of print and in poor quality. Cord was quoted in the obituary, stating:

"There was lots of noise-hisses and pops- and we wanted the listening experience to be just like it was when these recordings were brand new- only better."

== Recordings ==
=== 45 rpm ===
Performer(s)	Song title	Series/matrix #	Additional (conductor, composer, etc.) artist(s)
49th State Hawaiians	Aloha In Hawaii	HRC-45-116-A	Violet Lee Silva
49th State Hawaiians	Mi Nei - "How About Me?"	HRC-45-116-B	Chas. E. King
49th State Hawaiians	Hilo March	HRC 45 339 B HCv	
Abraham Kalauli Konanui	Hawaiian Melody	45-HRC-103-B	
Benjamin Rogers	Steel Guitar "C" Jam Boogie	HRC-45-275-B	Benjamin Rogers at the Hawaiian Steel Guitar
Benny (Benjamin) Rogers	Moana Chimes		Johnny Noble
Clara "Hilo Hattie" Inter	Pidgin English Hula	HRC-176-B	Charles E. King
Danny Kalama and his Island Serenaders	Pua Tubarose	HRC-333-B	C.E. King
Doddy & His Serenaders	Kona Kai O Pua	RR - J80 W - 1403	Vocal by Kelii Chun with Menehune Maidens
Doug Alii with The Royal Samoans	Tomi Tuli	HRC-387-A	Mulitauaopele
Emma Kahelelani Bishop	Kawika	HRC-205B	
Emma Kahelelani Bishop with Julia Nui's Kamaainas	Ka Momi O Hawaii Nei	HRC-203B	Emma Kahelelani Bishop
Farden Sisters	Laupahoehoe	HRC 337A	Irmgard, Emma, Edna, Maude, Diane; Lyricist: Mary Puku'I, Irmgard Aluli, N. Bacon
Farden Sisters	Leis	45-HRC-313-B	Irmgard, Emma, Edna, Maude, Diane, Emma K. Sharpe
Genoa Keawe	Aloha Oe (Farewell to Thee)	HRC-354-B	Music: John K. Almeida and His Hawaiians, Queen Lilioukalani
Genoa Keawe	My Sweet Gardenia lei	45-HRC-244-A	Genoa Keawe's Hula Maids, Lena Machado
Genoa Keawe and her Hawaiians	Hulu Manu	45-HRC-306-B	Richard Kamai
Genoa Keawe and her Hula Maids	Sea Breeze - "Pua Mana"	45-HRC-306-A Re 1	Music by John K. Almeida's Hawaiians, Hoffman-Manning-Aluli
Genoa Keawe and her Hula Maids	Ka Mano O Kalani Po	HRC 336 A	K. Zuttermeister, E. Furtado
Genoa Keawe and son Gary Ako	Hawaiian Wedding Song (Ke Kali Nei Au)	HRC-353-B	Music by John K. Almeida and His Hawaiians, Chas. E. King
Genoa Keawe with her Hula Maids	Magic Hands	HRC-45-277-B	Danny Stewart-Paul Chicareli
Genoa Keawe with her Hula Maids	Kila Kila O Haleakala	HRC-45-277-A	
George Naʻope	Ancient Chants	45-HRC 299B	
George Naʻope	Ka' Uwila Make Nei	HRC-354-A (RR H80W 1547)	Music: Albert Ahuna and His Hawaiians
George Naʻope with Genoa Keawe's Hula Maids	It's Just An Old Hawaiian Custom	45-HRC-242-A	Johnny Noble
George Naʻope with Her Hula Maids	Not Pau	45-HRC-247-A	Ray Kinney
George Naʻope with The Menehune Maidens	Kahi Mea I Aloha Ia	RRK80 W-1115, HRC-353-A	Music by Tropical Serenaders, Ulumahiehie
Ginny Kam	Hula Hula Hoops Dee Doo	45-HRC-313-A	John K. Almeida's Music, Ginny Kam
Harmony Isles Group	Hawaiian Instrumental Medley 4	45-HRC-244-B	
Harmony Isles Group	Tiari No Tahiti	HRC-387-B	
Harmony Isles Group	Hawaiian Instrumental Medley - 6: (1) My Yellow Ginger Lei, (2) Halona, (3) Kuu Ipo Pua Rose	45-HRC-247-B	
Henry Kaalekahi	Hookipa Paka - Maunawili	HRC-96-B	
Ivi Pele and The Royal Samoans	Gogu A Togi	HRC-383-A	Mulitauaopele
Ivi Pele and The Royal Samoans	Drums of Samoa	HRC-383-B	Mulitauaopele
Ivi Pele and The Royal Samoans	Migoi Migoi	HRC-384-A	Kuka Tuitama
Ivi Pele and The Royal Samoans	Fa'apei Ona Naunau	HRC-384-B	Mulitauaopele
Ivi Pele and The Royal Samoans	Slap Dance - O le alofa I la'u manu	HRC-386-A	
Ivi Pele and The Royal Samoans	Apia Drums	HRC-386-B	Mulitauaopele
Ivi Pele and The Royal Samoans	Tele I'A O Le Sami	HRC-382-A	Tuiteleapaga
Ivi Pele and The Royal Samoans	Pologa Ua Fai	HRC-382-B-RE	Mulitauaopele
Joe Kahaulelio	No Luna E Kahelekai	HRC 336 B	
Joe Kahaulelio	Chant: Ku I Molokai	HRC 327 B	
Joe Kahaulelio and his Hawaiians	Eleu Mikimiki	HRC 335 A	C.E. King
Joe Kahaulelio and his Hawaiians	Ia Oe Eka La	HRC 333 A	
Joe Keawe and his Harmony Hawaiians	My Little Grass Shack	HRC-96-A	Cogswell-Harrison-Noble
Joe Keawe and his Harmony Hawaiians	Nani Molokai	HRC 45 338 B HC	Hanakahi-Ah Yat
Joe Keawe and his Harmony Hawaiians	Hookipa Paka	HRC 331 B	Vocal: Joe Keawe and his Harmony Hawaiians, Alice Johnson
Joe Keawe with Julia Nui's Kamaainas	Kaneohe	HRC 335 B	
John K. Almeida with Genoa Keawe, Agnes Malabey and Wenonah Almeida	Alekoki	HRC-230-A	Kalakaua-Alohikea
John K. Almeida with Genoa Keawe's Hula Maids	Hukilau	HRC-45-275-A	Vocal by: John K. Almeida with Genoa Keawe's Hula Maids, Jack Owens
John K. Almeida with Hawaiian dance band	Ho'oluana Na Pua Like Ole	HRC-344-B	
John K. Almeida with Hawaiian dance band	Kuu Leilani	HRC-343-B	John K. Almeida
John Piilani Watkins with Hana's Heavendly Hawaiians	Waikaloa	45-HRC-517	John P. Watkins
John Piilani Watkins with Hana's Heavenly Hawaiians	The Hana Ranch	45-HRC-518	Lyn Stauffer
Johnny Almeida	Kuwili	HRC-45-87-A-RE-1	Genoa Keawe's Hula Maids
Johnny Almeida and his Hawaiians	Hula O Maki	EP-29A	Vocal, John Piilani Watkins with Genoa Keawe's Hula Maids, Jas. C. Kaapuiki
Johnny Almeida and his Hawaiians	Across the Sea	EP-29A	Vocal by June Ululani Leite, E. Kaai-J. Noble
Johnny Almeida and his Hawaiians	Pagan Love Song	EP-29B	Brown-Freed
Johnny Almeida and his Hawaiians	King's Serenade	EP-29B	Benjamin Rogers at the Hawaiian Steel Guitar, C.E. King
Johnny Almeida and his Hawaiians	Lovely Hula Hands	EP-HRC-30-A	R. Alex Anderson
Johnny Almeida and his Hawaiians	It's Just An Old Hawaiian Custom	EP-HRC-30-A	Benjamin Rogers at the Hawaiian Steel Guitar, Johnny Noble
Johnny Almeida and his Hawaiians	Beautiful Mahealani Moon	HRC-EP-30-B	John K. Almeida
Johnny Almeida and his Hawaiians	Anapau	HRC-EP-30-B	Benjamin Rogers at the Hawaiian Steel Guitar, Alvin Kaleolani
Johnny Almeida and his Hawaiians	Beyond the Reef	EP-HRC-31-A	Vocal by June Ululani Leite, Jack Pitman
Johnny Almeida and his Hawaiians	Hawaiian War Chant	EP-HRC-31-A	Vocal, Johnny Almeida and His Hawaiians, Freed-Noble-Leleiohaku
Johnny Almeida and his Hawaiians	On the beach at Waikiki	EP-HRC-31-B	Stover-Kalima
Johnny Almeida and his Hawaiians	Moana Chimes	EP-HRC-31-B	Benjamin Rogers at the Hawaiian Steel Guitar
Johnny Almeida with the Lei Momi Sweethearts	Kaulana Ke Kuahiwi O Haleakala - "To You, Oh, Mighty Haleakala"	HRC-53A 103-A	Alice Johnson
Johnny Piilani Watkins and his Paradise Serenaders	E Nani E	45-HRC-309-B	Gertrude Kaanapu
Johnny Watkins and his Paradise Serenaders	Pua Carnation	45-HRC-309-A	C.E. King
Joseph Solatoa	Minoi Minoi E	HRC-177-B	Genoa Keawe's Polynesians
June Ululani Leite	Beyond the Reef	HRC-203A	Jack Pitman
June Ululani Leite with Joe Keawe's Harmony Hawaiians	Hula Girl	HRC-230-B	
Keawehawaii's	Kealoha	RR - H8OW - 1045 / HRC-343-A	Vocal by Leilani Alama with Menehuna Maidens, Liko Johnston
Kent Bowman	Little Lei Puahi (Little Red Riding Hood)	HRC-45-251-A	
Mrs. Anna Kahalelehua Hall	Kawika	HRC-92-B	
Nora Keahi Santos	Show Me How They Do The Hula In Honolulu	HRC-183-A	
Pele Pukui	Nani Kilauea - "Beautiful Kilauea"	HRC 45 339 A HC	Kawena Pukui
Rainbow Serenaders	Sweet Hawaiian Chimes	HRC-183-B	
Tahiti Dances: To Drums Of Bora Bora And Papeete	Atamu	EP-39A	
Tahiti Dances: To Drums Of Bora Bora And Papeete	I Vaho	EP-39B	
Tahiti Dances: To Drums Of Bora Bora And Papeete	Maruru A Vau	EP-39A	
Tahiti Dances: To Drums Of Bora Bora And Papeete	Aratai	EP-39B	
Tahiti Dances: To Drums Of Bora Bora And Papeete	Toto To E	EP-39B	
Tahiti Dances: To Drums Of Bora Bora And Papeete	Ake	EP-40A	
Tahiti Dances: To Drums Of Bora Bora And Papeete	Tiare No Tahiti	EP-40A	
Tahiti Dances: To Drums Of Bora Bora And Papeete	Tiare Taporo	EP-40B	
Tahiti Dances: To Drums Of Bora Bora And Papeete	Mou'a	EP-40B	
Tanielu Hunkin and his Samoans	Samoan Dance - Lapapa, Sa-Sa	HRC 45 338 A HC	Tanielu Hunkin
The "K" Sisters	He Mea Nui Kealoha - "Love Is The Main Thing"	HRC 331 A	M. Robins, J. Noble
The "K" Sisters	Kuu Ipo Hua Pala	HRC 327 A	John K. Almeida

=== 78 rpm ===
Performer(s)	Song title	Series/matrix #	Additional (conductor, composer, etc.) artist(s)
Al Kealoha Perry and his Singing Surfriders	Wiliwili Wai	4707-2	Vocal by Andrew Bright and Surfriders, Liliuokalani
Alice Johnson And Her Troupe	Kaulana Molokai	HRC 99B	Alice Johnson
Andrew Bright with Al Kealoha Perry and his Singing Surfriders	Hawaiian Cowboy	PRC 4707-1	Sol K. Bright
Benny (Benjamin) Rogers	Panini Pua Kea	HRC-295-B	Benjamin Rogers at the Steel Guitar, John K. Almeida
Flora Waipa with Pua Almeida and his Polynesians	Beautiful Mahealani Moon	HRC-152 B	J.K. Almeida
Genoa Keawe and her Hawaiians	E Kuu Tutu	HRC-291-A	Genoa Keawe And Her Hawaiians, Mary K. Pukui, Madeline K. Lam
Genoa Keawe and her Hawaiians	Stevedore Hula	HRC-284-A	Genoa Keawe And Her Hawaiians, Bina Mossman
Genoa Keawe and her Hawaiians	Wailana	HRC-284-B	with Bina Mossman, Johnny Noble
Genoa Keawe and her Hawaiians	Lehua Puakea	HRC-286-A	with Bina Mossman
Genoa Keawe and her Hawaiians	Fireman Hula	HRC-287A	Genoa Keawe And Her Hawaiians, Kouwe-Noble
Genoa Keawe and her Hawaiians	Ka Iwa	HRC-292A	Genoa Keawe And Her Hawaiians, Mary K. Pukui, Madeline K. Lam
Genoa Keawe with John K. Almeida and his Hawaiians	Maile Swing	HRC 55-B	Genoa Keawe with John K. Almeida And His Hawaiians
Hawaiian Echoes	Papale Nui	HRC-156-A	The Hawaiian Echoes
Jimmy Moikeha	I'll Weave A Lei Of Stars	HRC 509	Owens-Anderson
Jimmy Moikeha	Hawaii Ponoi	HRC 510	Kalakaua-Berger
Jimmy Moikeha	Don't Play Aloha Oe When I Go	HRC 511	Noble-Luekens
Jimmy Moikeha	God Bless America	HRC 512	Irving Berlin
Jimmy Moikeha	Ke Kali Nei Au	HRC 507	Charles E. King
Jimmy Moikeha	Hawaii Calls	HRC 501	Hawaii's Own 11 year old "Bobby Breen", Harry Owens
Jimmy Moikeha	Na Lei O Hawaii	HRC 502	Hawaii's Own 11 year old "Bobby Breen", Charles E. King
Joe Keawe and his Harmony Hawaiians	Kaimana Hila	HRC-72-B	Vocal by Genoa Keawe's Hula Maids
Joe Keawe and his Harmony Hawaiians	In A Canoe	HRC 99A	
Joe Keawe with John K. Almeida and his Hawaiians	Pua Lilia	HRC 55-A	Joe Keawe with John K. Almeida And His Hawaiians, Alfred Alohikea
John K. Almeida and his Hawaiians	E Naughty Naughty Mai Nei	HRC-49-B	The Lei Momi Sweethearts, Mel Peterson
John K. Almeida and his Hawaiians	Lovely Hula Hands	HRC-49-A	Vocal Chorus by Lei Momi Sweethearts, Alex. Anderson
John K. Almeida and his Hawaiians	My Yellow Ginger Lei	HRC-52-A	Featuring Joe Keawe and The Lei Momi Sweethearts, J. K. Keawehawaii
John K. Almeida and his Hawaiians	Naka - Pueo	HRC-52-B	Featuring Vocal by Joe Keawe and The Lei Momi Sweethearts, Sam Kalani Kaeo
John K. Almeida and his Hawaiians	Anapau	HRC-64-A	Vocal by Johnny Almeida and Julia Nui's Kamaainas, Alvin Kaleolani
John K. Almeida and his Hawaiians	Noho Paipai	HRC-64-B	Vocal by Johnny Almeida and Julia Nui's Kamaainas
John K. Almeida and his Hawaiians	Hinano None!	HRC-58-A	Vocal by Johnny Almeida
John K. Almeida and his Hawaiians	He Aloha No O Honolulu	HRC-58-B	Vocal Chorus by Julia Nui's Kamaainas
John Piilani Watkins	Hamoa	HRC-513	Hana's Heavenly Hawaiians, John P. Watkins
John Piilani Watkins	Hana No Ka Oi	HRC-100-B	Hana's Heavenly Hawaiians, John P. Watkins
John Piilani Watkins with Hana's Heavenly Hawaiians	Heavenly Hana	HRC-519-B	Hana's Heavenly Hawaiians, John P. Watkins
John Piilani Watkins with Hana's Heavenly Hawaiians	Meka Nani Ao Kaupo	HRC-519	Hana's Heavenly Hawaiians, John P. Watkins
John Piilani Watkins with Hana's Heavenly Hawaiians	Hana Chant	HRC 515	Hana's Heavenly Hawaiians, John P. Watkins
John Piilani Watkins with Hana's Heavenly Hawaiians	Farewell, Hana Bids You Aloha	HRC 516	Hana's Heavenly Hawaiians, John P. Watkins
John Piilani Watkins with Hana's Heavenly Hawaiians	Waikaloa	HRC 517	Hana's Heavenly Hawaiians, John P. Watkins
John Piilani Watkins with Hana's Heavenly Hawaiians	The Hana Ranch	HRC 518	Hana's Heavenly Hawaiians, Lyn(?) Stauffer
John Pilani Watkins and his Trio	Ka Pua U'I	HRC-291-B	John Pilani Watkins And His Trio, Bina Mossman
John Pilani Watkins and his Trio	He Ia Nui Kau	HRC-286-B	John Pilani Watkins And His Trio
John Pilani Watkins and his Trio	Manu O-O	HRC-287B	John Pilani Watkins And His Trio
John Pilani Watkins and his Trio	Kuu Home Aloha	HRC-292B	John Pilani Watkins And His Trio, Bina Mossman
Myrtle K. Hilo with Joe Keawe's Harmony Hawaiians	Baby Kalae	HRC 147- A	Myrtle K. Hilo with Joe Keawe's Harmony Hawaiians, Kuulei Kua
Myrtle K. Hilo with John K. Almeida and Joe Keawe's Harmony Hawaiians	Kila Kila O Haleakala	HRC 147-B	Myrtle K. Hilo with John K. Almeida and Joe Keawe's Harmony Hawaiians
Myrtle K. Hilo with Male Chorus featuring Joe Keawe and his Harmony Hawaiians	Mauna Loa	HRC-155-A	Myrtle K. Hilo with Male Chorus featuring Joe Keawe And His Harmony Hawaiians, Helen K. Parker
Pua Almeida and his Polynesians	A Oia	HRC-155-B	John K. Almeida with Pua Almeida And His Polynesians
Pua Almeida and his Polynesians	E Huli Hoi Mai	HRC-151 A	Madeline K. Lam
Rainbow Serenaders	Kalua (Who Will Her Lover Be)	HRC 197-A	Haunani, Lydia and Louise, Buddy Marciel-Bill Kalama, Ken Darby
Royal Hawaiian Girls' Glee Club	Hilo Hattie Does The Hilo Hop	HT 200 D	Clara "Hilo Hattie" Inter, Don McDairmid

=== 33 1/3 rpm ===
Performer(s)	Song title	Series/matrix #	Additional (conductor, composer, etc.) artist(s)
49th State Hawaiians	Haole Hula	LP-3321-A	R.A. Anderson
Genoa Keawe and her Hula Maids	Hanauma	HRC-LP-3328-B	Madeline K. Lam, Mary K. Pukui
Genoa Keawe and her Hula Maids	Kaloaloa	HRC-3307-A	John P. Watkins
Genoa Keawe and her Polynesians	My Tropical Baby	LP-3321-A	Louisa Kapu
Genoa Keawe's Hula Maids	My Waikiki Girl	HRC-LP-3328-A	Pitman-Magoon
Genoa Keawe's Hula Maids	Song Of The Eight Islands	HRC-LP-3328-A	
Genoa Keawe's Hula Maids	Lani	HRC-LP-3328-B	Jack Pitman
Jimmy Moikeha with John K. Almeida's Hawaiians	Blue Hawaii	HRC-3307-B	Robin-Rainger
John Kamana and Simeon Bright	Hawaiian Scotchman	LP-3321-A	Sol K. Bright
Johnny Watkins with Genoa Keawe's Hula Maids	Aloha Wau Ia Oe	HRC-LP-3328-A	John P. Watkins
Johnny Watkins with Genoa Keawe's Hula Maids	Lola O'Brien The Irish Hawaiian	HRC-LP-3328-A	
Johnny Watkins with Genoa Keawe's Hula Maids	Hula O Maki	HRC-LP-3328-B	James C. Kaopuiki
Johnny Watkins with Genoa Keawe's Hula Maids	Nuuanu	HRC-LP-3328-B	
Julia Nui's Kamaainas with John K. Almeida's Hawaiians	Hula Lolo	HRC-3307-A	Aggie Auld
June Ululani Leite	Across the Sea	HRC-3307-B	Kaai-Noble
June Ululani Leite	Beyond the Reef	HRC-3307-B	Jack Pitman
Miriam Kaulupali and Pua Alani with John K. Almeida's Hawaiians	Ke Kali Nei Au	HRC-3307-A	Charles E. King
Nora Keahi Santos	Susie Anna	HRC-3307-A	Alice A. Ku
Samoan Chief Joseph Solatoa with Genoa Keawe's Polynesians	Tele I'a Ole Sami "Let Me Hear You Whisper"	LP-3321-B	
Samoan Chief Joseph Solatoa with Genoa Keawe's Polynesians	Minoi Minoi E	LP-3321-B	
Samoan Chief Joseph Solatoa with Genoa Keawe's Polynesians	Manini E	LP-3321-B	
Samoan Chief Joseph Solatoa with Genoa Keawe's Polynesians	Goodbye, My Felini	LP-3321-B	
