= Big Hawaii =

- Genre: Drama
- Created by: William Wood
- Country of origin: United States
- Original language: English
- No. of seasons: 1
- No. of episodes: 12 (3 unaired) (list of episodes)

Production
- Producer: William Finnegan
- Running time: 60 minutes
- Production companies: Finnegan Associates; Filmways

Original release
- Network: NBC
- Release: September 21 – November 23, 1977

Big Hawaii is an American drama television series that aired from September 21 until November 23, 1977 on NBC. The pilot film Danger In Paradise aired on May 12, 1977 (the series was also screened on ITV in Britain under that title).

== Premise ==
A wealthy family owns the massive Paradise Ranch on the island of Hawaii.

== Cast ==
- Cliff Potts as Mitch Fears
- John Dehner as Barrett Fears
- Lucia Stralser as Karen "Keke" Fears
- Bill Lucking as Oscar Kalahani
- Elizabeth Smith as Lulu (Auntie Lu)
- Moe Keale as Garfield
- Remi Abellira as Kimo
- Josie Over as Asita

== Episodes ==
No.	Title	Directed by	Written by	Original release date
1	"Gandy"	Unknown	Story by : Donald P. Bellisario; Teleplay by : Tim Maschler	September 21, 1977
Barrett's niece loses a large sum of money when she is conned by a pilot.
2	"The Sun Children"	Unknown	Unknown	September 28, 1977
The members of a new commune gets blamed for a typhoid epidemic.
3	"Pipeline"	Unknown	Unknown	October 12, 1977
Mitch protects a friend from a vicious ex-husband.
4	"Red Midnight"	Unknown	Unknown	October 19, 1977
Mitch crash-lands a plane near an erupting volcano.
5	"Graduation Eve"	Unknown	Unknown	October 26, 1977
Mitch and Oscar are deputized on the same night as a high school graduation.
6	"Yesterdays"	Unknown	Unknown	November 2, 1977
7	"You Can't Lose 'Em All"	Unknown	Unknown	November 9, 1977
The sidekick of a rodeo star plans to manipulate a match.
8	"The Trouble with Tina"	Unknown	Unknown	November 16, 1977
Mitch is falsely accused of rape.
9	"Sarah"	Unknown	Unknown	November 23, 1977
The leader of a halfway house for runaway girls becomes emotionally involved with a self-destructive teenager.
10	"Blind Rage"	N/A	N/A	Unaired
11	"The Sugar War"	N/A	N/A	Unaired
12	"Tightrope"	N/A	N/A	Unaired
