= The Brian Keith Show =

American sitcom (1972–1974)

- Also known as: The Little People (1st season)
- Genre: Sitcom
- Created by: Garry Marshall
- Starring: Brian Keith; Shelley Fabares; Moe Keale; Victoria Young; Roger Bowen; Sean Tyler Hall
- Theme music composer: Jerry Fielding (1st season); Artie Butler (2nd season)
- Opening theme: "A Little Love" by Alan O'Day (1st season)
- Country of origin: United States
- Original language: English
- No. of seasons: 2
- No. of episodes: 48

Production
- Executive producer: Garry Marshall
- Producer: Bruce Johnson
- Camera setup: Multi-camera
- Running time: 22–24 minutes
- Production companies: Miguel Productions; Warner Bros. Television

Original release
- Network: NBC
- Release: September 15, 1972 – March 29, 1974

The Brian Keith Show (titled The Little People during its first season) is an American sitcom that aired on NBC from September 15, 1972 to March 29, 1974, with reruns continuing until August 30, 1974. The series starred Brian Keith and Shelley Fabares.

== Synopsis ==
Keith plays Dr. Sean Jamison, a pediatrician running a free clinic for children in Hawaii. Shelley Fabares stars as his daughter Anne, who also works as a pediatrician alongside her father. The first-season supporting cast included Stephen Hague as Alfred Landis and Sean Tyler Hall as Stewart, two neighborhood youngsters. Keith's wife Victoria Young played Nurse Puni. Michael Gray appeared the first season as Ronnie Collins, a student doctor, and Moe Keale played Officer O'Shaughnessy. Keith drove a tiny 1970 Citroën Méhari jeep as his main automobile.

In the fall of 1973, with the series renamed The Brian Keith Show, Gray and Hague left the cast. Nancy Kulp and Roger Bowen joined the series in the roles of Dr. Jamison's wealthy landlady, Mrs. Millard Gruber, and the allergist, Dr. Austin Chaffee.

== Cast ==
- Brian Keith as Dr. Sean Jamison
- Shelley Fabares as Dr. Anne Jamison
- Victoria Young as Nurse Puni
- Sean Tyler Hall as Stewart
- Moe Keale as Officer O'Shaughnessy
- Michael Gray as Ronnie Collins (1972–1973)
- Stephen Hague as Alfred Landis (1972–1973)
- Nancy Kulp as Mrs. Millard Gruber (1973–1974)
- Roger Bowen as Dr. Austin Chaffee (1973–1974)

== Episodes ==
=== Season 1: The Little People (1972–73) ===
No. overall	No. in season	Title	Directed by	Written by	Original release date
1	1	"Tonsils for Two"	Unknown	Dick Bensfield & Perry Grant	September 15, 1972
A 6-year-old patient is afraid of having a tonsillectomy, and so is Dr. Jamison, who has been putting off his own tonsillectomy for months — but the doctor is tricked into having his tonsils removed.
2	2	"Little Boy Flu"	Unknown	Unknown	September 22, 1972
A boy has a psychological hangup: He gets sick every time his father plans to take him sailing, and his mother asks Dr. Jamison by phone to give her son a "favorable sick diagnosis" and to forbid him to accompany his father on a sailing trip.
3	3	"The Noise of Music"	Unknown	Unknown	September 29, 1972
Dr. Jamison becomes concerned about the fate of an infant being raised amid a rock music trio.
4	4	"The Lovers"	Unknown	Unknown	October 6, 1972
Dr. Jamison provokes the enmity of his staff, and the visit of a former girlfriend adds to his misery. Meanwhile, after a harmless kiss on the beach, Ronnie becomes infatuated with Anne and asks Dr. Jamison's permission to marry her.
5	5	"The Stork is Alive in Hawaii"	Gary Nelson	Dick Bensfield & Perry Grant	October 13, 1972
Dr. Jamison is determined not to address the local parent–teacher association despite Puni's pleading, and he convinces her that his daughter Anne would be the ideal speaker. Anne then battles misconceptions about conception as she runs up against the indignant members of the PTA.
6	6	"The Birthday Boy"	Unknown	Unknown	October 27, 1972
Anne, Puni, and a small boy plan a novel surprise for Dr. Jamison's birthday, not realizing how unusual it will become when his peskiest patient gets trapped in a mine shaft.
7	7	"And Then I Wrote Citizen Taboo"	Richard Lang	Unknown	November 3, 1972
A small boy is unhappy as he watches his parents become naturalized citizens, but the reason is not what Dr. Jamison and his staff assume: He resents his new baby brother, and Dr. Jamison notices that the child's resentment of the baby is far more intense and deep than is natural and common among older siblings of new babies.
8	8	"The Vet Set"	Unknown	Unknown	November 10, 1972
Dr. Jamison misinterprets a rush call to the children's zoo, believing his patient is a child, and runs into a series of misadventures with a chimpanzee.
9	9	"Sound Advice"	Howard Morris	Unknown	November 17, 1972
10	10	"The Love Bite Will Bug You"	Richard Lang	Unknown	November 24, 1972
When Puni joins some other women in protesting pollution by the business empire of Lady Whittaker, they get arrested for rioting, and Dr. Jamison is caught up in the middle of a comical mix-up when he is arrested as the ringleader of the riot. Then he meets Lady Whittaker, who turns out not to be British but an islander, and love blooms.
11	11	"Kicking the Habit"	Unknown	Unknown	December 1, 1972
Dr. Jamison finally convinces Alfred's father to set a good example and stop smoking, then discovers that kicking a bad habit can have humorous as well as frustrating results when some of his little patients stage a smoke-in and he also has to give up smoking.
12	12	"Take It Off, Take it All Off"	Richard Lang	Unknown	December 8, 1972
Dr. Jamison tries to prevent a four-year-old girl from disrobing in front of boys.
13	13	"Splish Splash, I Was Taking a Nap"	Gary Nelson	Unknown	December 15, 1972
One of Dr. Jamison′s patients is a young football player who has a great future — if only he could stop wetting the bed.
14	14	"Puni B. DeMille"	Gary Nelson	Unknown	December 22, 1972
Puni is directing and casting the annual Christmas pageant. Determined to make it better than ever — bigger, more colorful, and more spectacular — she decides that no one can count on playing the role he or she played last year, and she disappoints Dr. Jamison, who always plays Santa Claus, by disqualifying him from playing Santa because he is too grumpy.
15	15	"The Matchmaker"	Gary Nelson	Unknown	January 5, 1973
Anne is despondent when her boyfriend leaves for the United States mainland and Dr. Jamison is forced to play matchmaker — with unintended results that lead to romantic misadventure.
16	16	"Honest Sean Driving Again"	Gary Nelson	Unknown	January 12, 1973
In a comedy of errors, Dr. Jamison's medical practice and love life take a back seat as he faces frustration and embarrassment when Puni fails to remind him to renew his driver's license before it expires, Officer O'Shaughnessy pulls him over after he runs a stop sign, and an unyielding examiner flunks him on his driving test.
17	17	"Malpractice Makes Perfect"	Richard Lang	Unknown	January 19, 1973
Dr. Jamison and his lawyer friend Jerry prepare to go to the church where Jerry is to be married with Dr. Jamison as his best man, but before they can leave, Dr. Jamison has to treat a 13-year-old teenage singing idol for a sore throat.
18	18	"The Bestest Doctor in the Whole Wide World"	Brian Keith	Unknown	January 26, 1973
Against his better judgment, Dr. Jamison stars in a movie made by one of his little patients for a school project, and a comedic madhouse ensues.
19	19	"Man's Best Friend...His Allergy"	Unknown	Unknown	February 2, 1973
When Anne accuses Dr. Jamison of interfering with some of her patients, they decide to divide them up alphabetically, but Dr. Jamison seems to have forgotten the alphabet. Meanwhile, Stewart develops a mysterious allergy to his new puppy and the thankless task of taking away the child's pet falls to Anne.
20	20	"Break a Leg"	Richard Lang	Unknown	February 16, 1973
Stewart receives a skateboard from Alfred, then leaves it in a hallway where Dr. Jamison accidentally steps on it, and reprisals ensue.
21	21	"Sean's Midas Touch"	Richard Lang	Unknown	February 23, 1973
Dr. Jamison's several bumbling attempts to raise money for a children's hospital prove disastrous until Anne gets the local veterinarian involved, resulting in a successful approach to fundraising.
22	22	"The Man Who Came to Luau"	Howard Morris	Unknown	March 9, 1973
A retired Postal Service employee vacationing in Hawaii hoodwinks Dr. Jamison into becoming his personal guide, and during the tour they become involved in a wacky incident. The retiree then insists that Dr. Jamison is a foot doctor, not a pediatrician, and wants Dr. Jamison to treat him — even going as far as to claim over the telephone that he is Harry Belafonte .
23	23	"The Generation Gap"	Howard Morris	Jack Elinson & Norman Paul	March 23, 1973
A hard-nosed United States Army sergeant makes a fool of himself after he seeks help for a problem that doesn't exist: He thinks his son is a sissy. Also entitled "My Son, the Strange One."
24	24	"Sean Meets Double X-7"	Richard Lang	Michael Leeson & Steve Zacharias	March 30, 1973
A 10-year-old with a very active imagination infiltrates Dr. Jamison's office disguised as a secret agent and causes pandemonium when he makes things disappear.
25	25	"TV or Not TV"	Unknown	Unknown	April 6, 1973
Dr. Jamison appears on a children's television show as a public service and suddenly is hit in the face with a pie and subjected to other outlandish tricks, all part of the show's format.

=== Season 2: The Brian Keith Show (1973–1974) ===
No. overall	No. in season	Title	Directed by	Written by	Original release date
26	1	"Dr. Chaffee, I Presume"	Earl Bellamy	Bob Brunner	September 21, 1973
Dr. Jamison has his first encounter with a very proper allergist, Dr. Austin Chaffee, who rents office space at his medical facility. Austin immediately takes over Dr. Jamison's staff.
27	2	"The Camp Doctor"	Earl Bellamy	Austin & Irma Kalish	September 28, 1973
Dr. Jamison receives a frantic call and rushes to the location, thinking it is a children's camp. To his surprise and chagrin he finds a nudist colony — and tries to maintain his cool while treating the emergency.
28	3	"Austin Moves In"	Earl Bellamy	Dick Bensfield & Perry Grant	October 5, 1973
Dr. Jamison realizes his mistake when he shares his home with Austin, who begins to develop a rapport with Anne. His frustrations skyrocket at the thought of Austin as a possible son-in-law, and he devises various plans to keep the two apart.
29	4	"The Pineapple League"	Earl Bellamy	Dick Bensfield & Perry Grant	October 12, 1973
A girl wants to be on the Little League team Dr. Jamison coaches, leading to all sorts of objections, and his efforts to make people look at the situation rationally have little success.
30	5	"Inflation"	Earl Bellamy	David Ketchum & Bruce Shelly	October 19, 1973
Puni secretly moonlights at a golf range to supplement her income, and is so exhausted from working two jobs that she makes mistakes at the clinic and Austin wants her fired. Then she suffers a black eye — and the male nurse who takes over for her nearly organizes the clinic out of business.
31	6	"Sean, the Allergist"	Earl Bellamy	Paul West	October 26, 1973
When a falling coconut hits Austin on the head, Dr. Jamison temporarily takes over his allergy practice while he recovers — but Austin's patients consider Dr. Jamison′s bedside manner too gruff, and he shocks them with his diagnoses of certain itches.
32	7	"Sean, the Swinger"	Earl Bellamy	David P. Harmon	November 2, 1973
Dr. Jamison is rumored to be a swinger and wild partier after attending a singles party, and his popularity soars. But when he disappoints a few of his dates, his reputation suffers and he tries to set the record straight.
33	8	"Sunday, Fishy Sunday"	Unknown	Dick Bensfield & Perry Grant	November 9, 1973
Dr. Jamison plans a relaxing day of fishing for his Sunday, but instead spends the day dealing with a parking-lot baby delivery, Puni being tossed in jail, and having to teach Sunday school.
34	9	"The Big Build-Up"	Unknown	Unknown	November 16, 1973
Dr. Jamison enjoys his own little part of the island, which he considers paradise. But after he requests a children's bathroom for his clinic, he is outraged when he hears that the bathroom project has mushroomed into Mrs. Gruber joining with a promoter to build a huge medical office complex near him.
35	10	"Uncle Timothy"	Unknown	Dick Bensfield & Perry Grant	November 23, 1973
Dr. Jamison's uncle, a retired doctor, visits Anne and him on a 10-day "swinging" Hawaiian vacation that turns their lives upside down and is capped with a marriage proposal to Mrs. Gruber.
36	11	"Double Date"	Howard Morris	David Ketchum & Bruce Shelly	November 30, 1973
Preempted by Frankenstein: The True Story, Part I.
37	12	"Doctor Take Five"	Unknown	Unknown	December 7, 1973
Dr. Jamison becomes an immediate celebrity when he delivers quintuplets. When his clinic becomes a stop on the tourism circuit, he must figure out a way to put a stop to it to give his patients and their parents peace and a sense of normality.
38	13	"The Thunderball Syndicate"	Earl Bellamy	Paul West	December 21, 1973
Anne's new boyfriend Jeff is a financial advisor and they are worried about Dr. Jamison's finances, so Jeff convinces Dr. Jamison to invest in livestock, and in particular to stake his financial future and that of his friends on the potential breeding fees of a $25,000 prize bull.
39	14	"Here Comes the What?"	Earl Bellamy	Austin & Irma Kalish	January 11, 1974
Dr. Jamison is undecided on how to proceed when the first baby he ever delivered — now an adult and a beautiful bride-to-be — shows up and asks him to do her the favor of officiating at her "non-marriage," a commitment ceremony that has no legal bearing.
40	15	"Sean the Dad"	Unknown	Unknown	January 18, 1974
Dr. Jamison temporarily takes care of young Stewart while his parents are on a trip and finds that doing so includes more than he realized, including "new math" homework, attending Indian Scouts, and waking up to kiddie cartoons.
41	16	"Make Room for Sean"	Earl Bellamy	Gerry Renert & Jeff Wilhelm	January 25, 1974
After Anne lets Dr. Jamison stay with her while Mrs. Gruber has his apartment painted, Anne's uninhibited lifestyle causes him concern and in spite of himself he begins to interfere.
42	17	"Play It Again, Sean"	Earl Bellamy	Dick Bensfield & Perry Grant	February 1, 1974
After Anne and Puni convince him to become a music student, Dr. Jamison grudgingly tries piano lessons, but he unwittingly leads a music revolt among the island′s children when he quits his lessons, and then must convince the kids of the value of getting a musical education.
43	18	"The Ultra Marine"	Unknown	Unknown	February 15, 1974
Dr. Jamison is delighted when his old United States Marine Corps buddy Linc arrives in Hawaii to live the island life, but he is slightly perturbed when he learns that Linc now makes a living painting female nudes and becomes more annoyed when Linc shows a romantic interest in Anne.
44	19	"Sean-Do the Magician"	Unknown	Unknown	February 22, 1974
Dr. Jamison's magic tricks delight six fatherless children so much that they think he would make the perfect father and try tricking him into becoming their father. He tries to extricate himself from the situation and yet make the kids life better by finding them a place to live — but a big magic show, with Austin involved, proves you can't trick a woman in love.
45	20	"The Titanic Sails Again"	Unknown	David Ketchum & Bruce Shelly	March 1, 1974
A con-man talks Dr. Jamison into accepting half-ownership in a catamaran as payment for a bill, but does not tell him of the boat's condition — and it is so dilapidated and unseaworthy that it is a money pit, and repairing it begins to take up all of Dr. Jamison's time.
46	21	"No Man Is an Atoll"	Unknown	Dick Bensfield & Perry Grant	March 8, 1974
To get away from all the stress and distractions of the modern world, Dr. Jamison arranges a camping trip on a remote island, but he and his friends encounter Captain Tuttle, an eccentric and feisty recluse who ensures their vacation is anything but relaxing.
47	22	"A Star Is Sean"	Earl Bellamy	Bob Brunner	March 15, 1974
When Dr. Jamison lets an eccentric young filmmaker film a documentary on children's medicine at his clinic as a public service for children, the filmmaker's presence disrupts the office routine and makes Dr. Jamison even more irascible than usual — and he is shocked to discover the film has X-rated overtones.
48	23	"Classmates"	Unknown	Unknown	March 29, 1974
Austin falls for Anne′s old college friend Linda. Anne is stunned to discover that Linda is now a prostitute, and she and Dr. Jamison must decide whether to tell the innocent Austin about Linda′s line of work.
