= John Kameaaloha Almeida =

Blind musician, songwriter (1897–1985)

Background information
- Also known as: Johnny Kameaaloha Almeida
- Born: John Celestino Almeida Jr. November 28, 1897; Pauoa Valley, Oahu, Republic of Hawaii
- Died: October 9, 1985 (aged 87) Honolulu, Hawaii
- Genre: Hawaiian
- Occupations: Singer, musician
- Instruments: Vocals, ukulele, mandolin, guitar, steel guitar, violin, banjo, bass saxophone, piano
- Years active: 1901–1985
- Labels: Brunswick Records; Hawaiian Transcription Productions; 49th State Records; Waikiki Records; Hana Ola

John Kameaaloha Almeida (November 28, 1897 – October 9, 1985) was a blind musician and songwriter from Oahu, Hawaii.

His 1930s radio program on Hawaii radio station KGU earned him the sobriquet "The Dean of Hawaiian Music". By the time of his death he had composed hundreds of meles that have today become Hawaiian music standards.

== Family life ==
Almeida was born John Celestino Almeida Jr. in the Pauoa Valley on the island of Oʻahu in the then-Republic of Hawaii. His father was Portuguese contract laborer John Celestino Almeida Sr.; his mother was Honolulu lei seller Julia Kamaka Almeida. On December 25, 1900, John's sister Annie was born. John Sr. soon deserted the family and returned to Portugal. Julia and the children moved to Wai'anae, where they eventually moved in with Paulo Kameaaloha, who became hānai (Note: Hānai is the Hawaiian tradition of fostering, or unofficial adoption, where one family gives a child to another family to raise.) father to both children. John carried his hānai name Kameaaloha for the rest of his life, becoming John Kameaaloha Almeida. Paulo and Julia added sister Martha to the family in 1904. Conversations in the Kameaaloha home were held exclusively in Hawaiian, giving young Johnny the advantage of being bilingual at an early age.

Around the time of his birth his mother was gathering the maile shrub for making leis, she did not have time to wash off the poisonous sap which led to his early blindness. As Johnny's vision worsened, his musical ability grew with his accomplishments on his beloved 'ukulele, which he discovered at the age of four. By then, he was already active in church choir. Paulo taught Johnny ancient chants and traditional songs. John was totally blind by the age of 10. His mother's doctor diagnosed the "probable" cause as maile sap on her hands at the time of John's birth. Advances over the past century in knowledge of childhood vision loss indicate a more likely cause to be congenital blindness.

On September 3, 1919, John Almeida married his first wife Elizabeth. Hawaiian musician Wenonah became Almeida's second and fourth wife. Doris Booker from California was his third wife, and Janet became the fifth.

== Musical career ==
The Òwai'anae Star Glee was started by Almeida at age 15, and evolved into "Johnny Almeida's Hawaiians," performing at community functions as word spread of Almeida's talents. He performed at Queen Liliuokalani's funeral in 1917, in the Royal Throne Room of Iolani Palace as Hawaii's last monarch lay in state, and then again during the services at Kawaiahaʻo Church. He performed for Prince Jonah Kalaniana'ole, Princess Abigail Kawananakoa and Princess Elizabeth as his audience began to grow.

Almeida began to spread his performances to neighboring islands. By the age of 25, he had mastered additional musical instruments, including the steel guitar, violin, banjo, bass, saxophone, and piano. He was the chief musician on Matson Lines ships from 1922 to 1927, sailing between Hawai'i and the West Coast. He was a regular performer on the Hawaii Calls radio show.

He is credited with composing over 300 songs, including "Iesu Me Ke Kanaka Waiwai," "Tuberose Hula" and "Green Rose Hula."

== Influence on other musicians ==
Almeida and his wife Elizabeth took his sister Annie's son, Charleston Puaonaona, into their home as their hānai son. The nephew took the name Pua Almeida and became John Almeida's first musical protege. Under John's tutelage, Pua became a legendary Hawaiian performer in his own right.

Aunty Genoa Keawe dates her first professional association with Almeida to 1946, when he issued an on-air invitation at radio station KULA for anyone who could sing, to come to the studio and go on air. From that meeting, Almeida began to mentor her and encourage her to sing Hawaiian songs. Her first recorded song for 49th State Records was Almeida's composition Maile Swing, which became an immediate hit for her.

Almeida was also instrumental in launching the careers of falsetto virtuosos Joe Keawe and Bill Ali'iloa Lincoln, known as "Hawaii's Falsetto Poet", as well as Hawaii steel guitar legends Billy Hew Len and David Keli'i.

On December 13, 1971, these protégés and other performers honored Almeida with a testimonial at the Coral Ballroom of the Hilton Hawaiian Village Hotel.

== Death ==
On October 9, 1985, Almeida died of arteriosclerosis. He is buried at Hawaiian Memorial Park.

== Discography ==
- John Kameaaloha Almeida (2003) CD (Hana Ola Records)
- "Mauna Loa" (date unknown) with Myrtle K. Hilo And Joe Keawe's Harmony Hawaiians on 49th State Hawaii record company

John Almeida Hawaiians instrumental ensemble

Recording session with Victor April 7, 1935

- "Ua noho a kupa"
- "Across the sea"
- "Kuu ipa pua loke" (also composer)
- "Pauoa hula"
- "Panini pua kea" (also composer)
- "Beautiful Keala" (also arranger)

== Recognition ==
In 1998, Almeida became an honoree in the Hawaiian Music Hall of Fame.
