= Hawaiian Renaissance =

Resurgence of distinct Hawaiian cultural identity

The Hawaiian Renaissance (also called the Hawaiian Cultural Renaissance) was the Hawaiian resurgence of a distinct cultural identity that draws upon traditional Kānaka Maoli culture, with a significant divergence from the tourism-based culture which Hawaiʻi was previously known for worldwide (along with the rest of Polynesia). The Hawaiian Renaissance has been pointed to as a global model for biocultural restoration and sustainability.

== First Hawaiian Renaissance ==
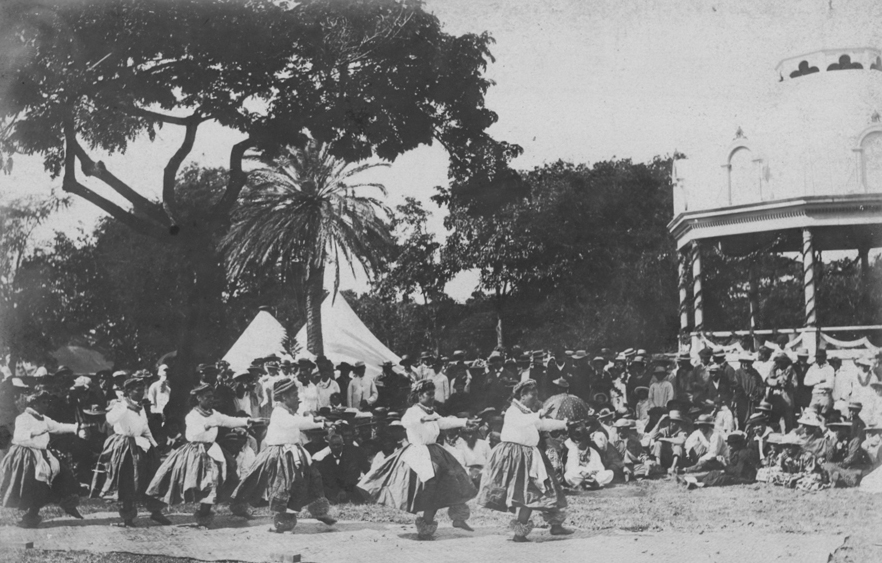
Kalakaua's 49th Birthday Hula

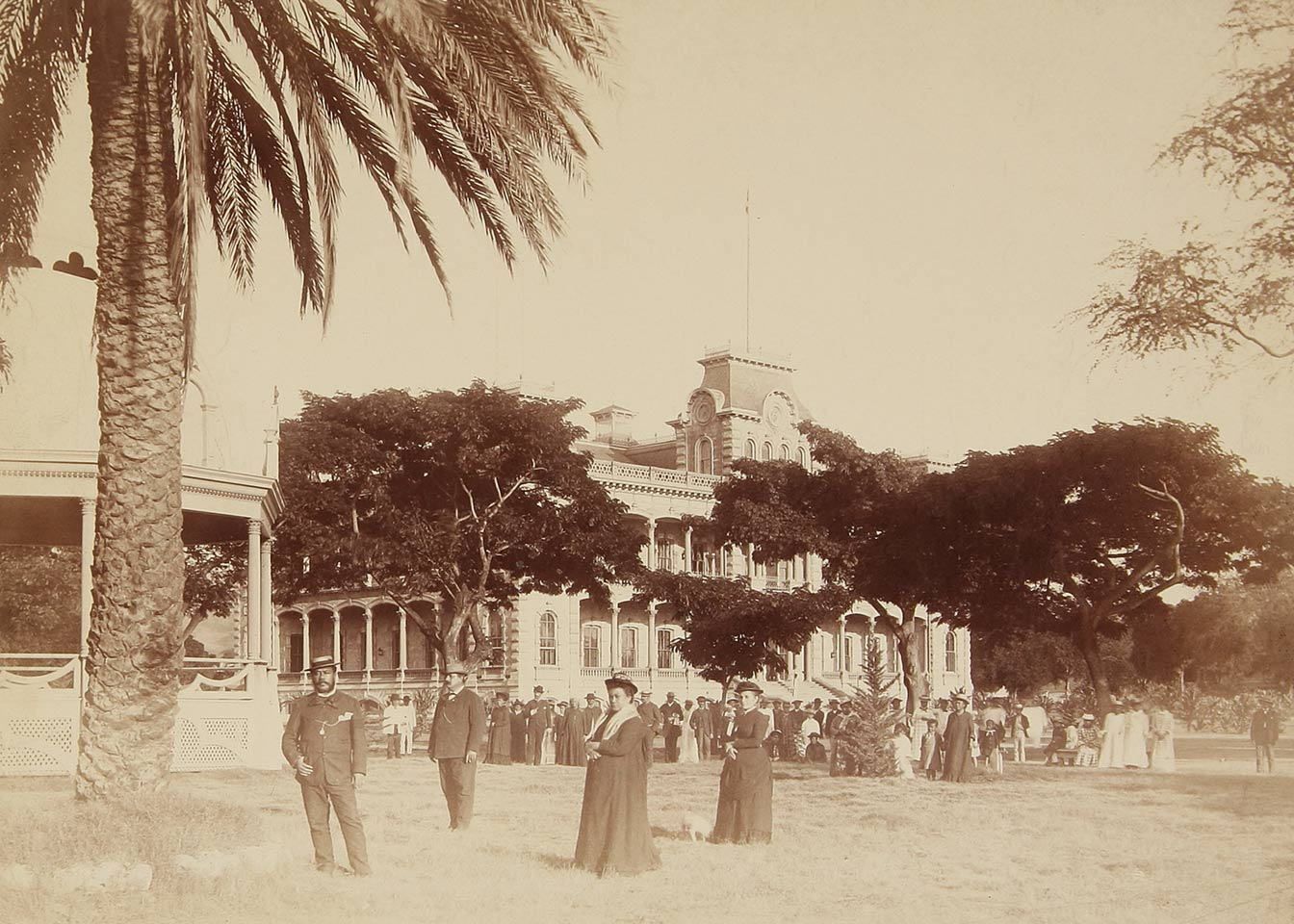
ʻIolani Palace, 1882 (foreground left to right) Kalakaua, Charles Hastings Judd, Kapiolani, and Antoinette Manini Swan.

The First Hawaiian Renaissance had its foundation in the nationalist sentiments of King Kamehameha V. At the time Hawaii was an independent kingdom. The intention was to form a contemporary national identity rather than modeling Hawaii after Great Britain and the culture of the United States. King Kalākaua rise to power faced internal conflicts between family lineage. Some islanders, particularly nobles, wanted Kalākaua, whereas a large contingent of commoners cheered for his competitor, Queen Emma, wife of Kamehameha IV and a humanitarian leader. The result spread tension between the people themselves, but most came to favor Kalākaua as he brought back Hawaiian culture to urban areas.

Kalākaua took steps to perpetuate nationalism, replacing the considerably Christian national anthem He Mele Lahui Hawaii with Hawaiʻi Ponoʻī in 1876, inspired by Kamehameha I. He had the aged ʻIolani Palace rebuilt, starting in 1879 and finishing in 1882.

Despite early efforts to earn favor with the haole people, growing views he was putting his people over the others continued. The Hawaiian people loved him; however, missionaries' descendants did not enjoy dealings with Kalākaua. The missionaries' descendants had gained power in Hawai'i by buying land. They were influential enough on the island that they held advisory positions to Kalākaua, though the king didn't always agree with their opinions. He always put his people first, and that sometimes meant denying missionaries' ideas.

Kalākaua spent three years planning his second coronation in 1883 to try to ease racial tensions between the Hawaiians and the haoles, and 8,000 people attended. Kalākaua sponsored several traditional Hawaiian practices such as hula (which had been banned in 1830 by queen regent Kaʻahumanu as part of the effort to uproot Hawaiian traditional religion and impose Christianity on Hawaii), chants, sports, and royal rituals. He also had Hawaiian myths, legends, and chants recorded in media such as the Kumulipo and had his genealogy traced.

== Second Hawaiian Renaissance ==
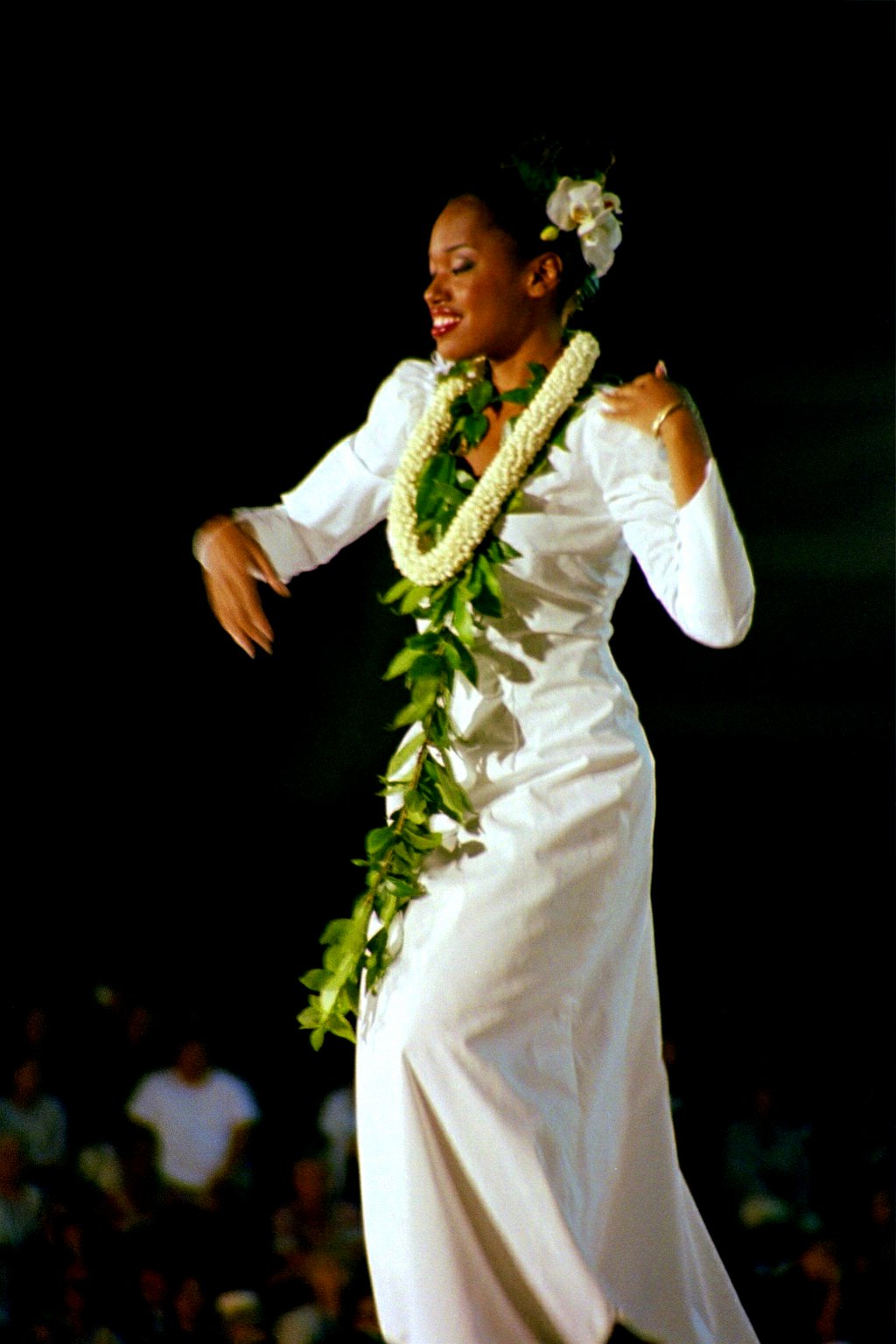
Merrie Monarch Festival, 2003

The Second Hawaiian Renaissance is considered to have started in 1970 and drew from similar cultural movements from the late 1960s and early 1970s. This Hawaiian Renaissance which began in the 1970s fostered a revival of cultural and political activism among the Kanaka Maoli. It is mostly known for its music, such as Gabby Pahinui and his work with the Sons of Hawaii or Keola, and Kapono Beamer's traditionalist slack-key music and signature twin-hole guitar designs constructed at the Guitar and Lute Workshop. Other noted Hawaiian musicians who played an integral role in the renaissance were Dennis Pavao, Ledward Kaʻapana, and Nedward Kaʻapana. The Kaʻapana brothers, along with their cousin Pavao, formed the falsetto trio Hui ʻOhana. The musical group Olomana also contributed to the music of this period with songs like 'O Malia' and 'Mele O Kahoolawe'.

This period in Hawaiian history is also associated with a renewed interest in the Hawaiian language, Pidgin, hula, traditional Hawaiian crafts, Hawaiian studies, and other cultural items.

This increase in Hawaiian self-identity was inspired by the 1964 essay "On Being Hawaiian" by writer John Dominis Holt, IV, who brought pride back to being Hawaiian after decades of negative stereotypes.

The Merrie Monarch Festival, established in 1964 by Helene Hale, caused a resurgence in the study and practice of ancient hula dancing, which had been developed and danced before 1893.

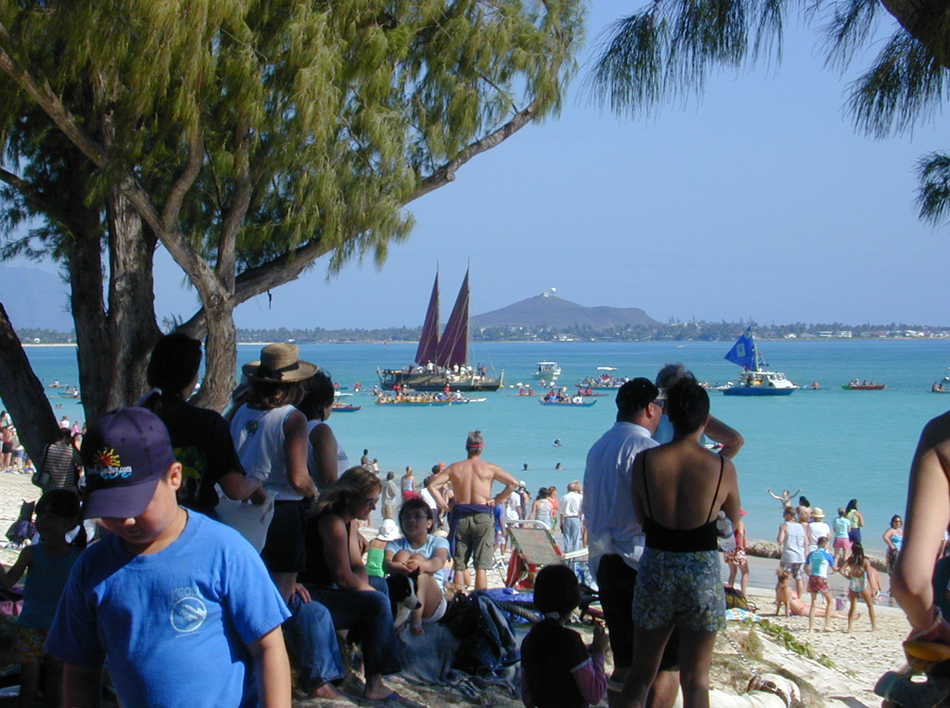
Hokulea and outrigger canoes at Kailua, 2005

Polynesian voyaging is also a large aspect of the Hawaiian Renaissance. In 1975, the Polynesian Voyaging Society built a replica of an ancient Polynesian voyaging canoe. The vessel was named Hōkūleʻa and is an example of re-adoption of non-instrument wayfinding navigation. Hokule'a's creator and first navigator, Ben Finney, is an icon of the Hawaiian Renaissance and contributed to resurging interest in Polynesian culture.

The movement also had political aspects, such as issues dealing with Native Hawaiians and the restoration of Hawaiian independence. Amongst the outcomes were the Constitution of 1978, which produced the Office of Hawaiian Affairs, and reclaiming federal land to the state like Kahoolawe. The era also included intense land struggles such as that of Kalama Valley, Kahoʻolawe and Waiāhole-Waikāne, and a resurgence of traditional practices such as loʻi kalo (taro patch) farming, folk arts, and mālama ʻāina (traditional forestry / land healing and restoration).

The height of the Hawaiian Renaissance is considered to have been the 1970s, and had mostly waned by 1980, although some refer to it as a still-contemporary movement.

== See also ==
- National revival
- Merrie Monarch Festival
- Eddie Kamae
- Kalākaua
- Polynesian Voyaging Society
- Surfing
- Lūʻau
