= Benny Kalama =

- Benny Kalama album cover art

Background information
- Also known as: Benny Kalama; Ben Kalama
- Born: Benjamin Kapena Kalama; June 29, 1916; Kohala, Big island of Hawaii
- Died: September 21, 1999 (aged 83) Honolulu, Hawaii
- Occupation: Live performer
- Instruments: Ukulele; Bass guitar Steel guitar
- Years active: 1930–1999
- Labels: Cord International; Lehua; Universal Geffen; Capitol; Hana Ola
- Formerly of: Leonard Red Hawk and the Waikikians; Alfred Apaka; Malcolm Beelby Orchestra; Don McDiarmid; Wally Lavque; Andry Bright

Benjamin Kapena Kalama (1916 – 1999) was an American singer with a honey-voiced falsetto. He is credited with discovering and nurturing Alfred Apaka, and was part of several groups. Until the day Apaka died, Kalama was coaching and arranging music for him.

== Biography ==
Kalama was born on June 29, 1916. He was born on the Big Island of Hawai'i.

At Kalakaua Intermediate School in 1931, Benny began playing trombone in the band. Upon graduation from McKinley High School where he played in the band, Kalama hooked up with Leonard "Red" Hawk and the Waikikians. Kalama's ability to read music, rather than play by ear, got him hired by the more successful bands. It was Hawk who wrote the lyrics and music to the ubiquitous song May Day is Lei Day in Hawaii. In 1938, Kalama played steel guitar substituting for Sam Kaʻapuni with the Malcolm Beelby Orchestra.

Kalama worked with the Don McDiarmid Sr band at the Royal Hawaiian Hotel, the Kewalo Inn and La Hula Rhumba on Lulalilo Street. McDiarmid, along with Johnny Noble, had penned Hilo Hattie's signature tune When Hilo Hattie Does the Hilo Hop. During this period of his career, Kalama worked with Alfred Apaka, George Kainapau, Alvin Isaacs Sr and Tommy Castro.

In between his participation with the McDiarmid band, Benny played with the Wally Lavque's band, also at the Royal Hawaiian Hotel. He toured the mainland with the Royal Hawaiian Serenaders, appearing in movies and on recordings.

Benny Kalama was with Andy Bright's band the years 1952–1955 at the Moana Hotel in Waikiki.

In 1955, he began working with Alfred Apaka in Las Vegas, followed by 15 years with Henry Kaiser's Hawaiian Village. Kalama's arrangements are credited with helping Apaka's success.

On radio, Kalama was a director and arranger on KGU's Voice of Hawaii program prior to bombing of Pearl Harbor. From 1952 onward, Kalama was musical director and arranger for Hawaiʻi Calls.

== Later years ==
Until before his death, Kalama played at the Halekulani's House Without a Key nightclub with Alan Akaka and Walter Moʻokini's Islanders, and also as part of the stage band for the annual Steel Guitar Hoʻolauleʻa.

Kalama died 21 September 1999.

== Discography ==
=== Benny Kalama ===
- Hawaii's Golden Treasures (1996) CD 100 (Surfside)
- Twilight in Hawaii w/Nina Kealiiwahamana (1996) CD 1008 (MIM)
- Legends of Falsetto (2000) CD 35000 (Cord International)
- He Is Hawaiian Music (2000) CD SLCD-7054 (Lehua)
- Steel Guitar Magic (2000) CD 31000 (Mountain Apple)
- My Isle of Golden Dreams (2003) CD 1233 (Cord International)
- Around the World in 80 Shakes (2006) CD 93133 (Universal Geffen)

=== Ben Kalama's Islanders ===
- How'd Ya Do / My Island (1954) promo single F2908 (Capitol)
- Webley Edwards Presents Hawaii Calls at Twilight (1956) LP album T 582 (Capitol)
- Hawaii Calls: Greatest Hits (1960) LP album ST 1339 (Capitol)
- I Wish They Didn't Mean Goodbye / Forevermore (Lei Aloha, Lei Makame) w/Alfred Apaka (1960) promo single 9-31057 (Decca)
- Hawaii Aloha w/Dona Klein (1979) LP album S 5361 (Chapel)
- Lei of Stars (1998) comp single HOCD 31000 (Hana Ola)

== Recognition ==
The Hawai'i Academy of Recording Arts awarded Kalama the 1993 Na Hoku Hanohano Lifetime Achievement Award for his substantial contributions to the entertainment industry in Hawaii.
