= Pua Almeida =

Hawaiian steel guitarist

Pua Almeida (1922–1974) was a Hawaiian steel guitarist, considered a leading performer on that instrument.

Almeida (sometimes given as "Alameida") was born in 1922 in Honolulu. His musical start began in the band of his father, John Kameaaloha Almeida. He formed his own big band, "The Sunset Serenaders" and performed at several top venues around Hawaii. He relocated to Southern California in 1947, performing in clubs. As the Hawaiian steel guitar achieved international status in the 1940s, Almeida was recognized as a master of the instrument. In 1958 he began a 16-year association with the Surfrider Hotel.

He recorded for American Decca Records in 1966 and for MGM Records. For seventeen years he was commonly featured on the Hawaii Calls radio program.

Pua suffered from poor heart health, and died in 1974.
