= Eddie Kamae =

American ukulele player (1927–2017)

Background information
- Also known as: Eddie Kamae
- Born: Edward Leilani Kamae; August 4, 1927; Honolulu, Oahu, Hawaii
- Died: January 7, 2017 (aged 89) Honolulu, Oahu, Hawaii
- Occupations: Musician; film producer; Hawaiian culture historian
- Instrument: Ukulele
- Years active: 1940–2017
- Label: Lehua
- Formerly of: Sons of Hawaii
- Website: Sons of Hawaii

Edward Leilani "Eddie" Kamae (August 4, 1927 – January 7, 2017) was one of the founding members of Sons of Hawaii. He was a 'ukulele virtuoso, singer, composer, film producer and primary proponent of the Hawaiian Cultural Renaissance.

== Biography ==
Eddie Leilani Kamae was born on August 4, 1927 in Honolulu, Hawaii, and raised both there and in Lahaina, Maui. His grandmother was a dancer for King David Kalākaua's court.

He learned to play the 'ukulele with an instrument his bus driver brother found on the public transport. Eddie would sit by the radio and try to play with any rhythm section he was hearing, usually Latin, classical and jazz tunes. When he was 14 years old, his father would take him to jam sessions where Eddie would get up on stage to play, earning accolades from the audiences who threw money at the performers' feet. Kamae began going to Queen's Surf to listen to the Hawaiian music being played.

Kamae began to teach ukulele. 2006 'Ukulele Hall of Fame Inductee Herb Ohta Sr., also known at Ohta-San, was mentored by Kamae. Kamae died on January 7, 2017, at the age of 89. In addition, he contributed a lot to the influence of Hawaiian music on the rest of the world.

== Sons of Hawaii ==
Kamae was introduced to Gabby Pahinui in 1959, and the slack key virtuoso demonstrated a new way to make the 'ukulele "talk story". Kamae himself would come to be known for his inventive methods of plucking all four strings simultaneously, playing the chords and melody at the same time. They began playing together and formed Sons of Hawaii, with their first paying gig at The Sand Box.

== Film producer ==
Mary Kawena Pukui and Pilahi Paki became Eddie's first teachers in the Hawaiian language. Eddie began to feel a growing need to teach the Hawaiian culture through music, to pass it along to succeeding generations. Eddie began to chart a new course with his arts.

His 1971 initial meeting with Hawaiian poet Sam Li'a Kalainaina Jr. resulted in Kamae's first documentary in 1988, LI'A: The Legacy of a Hawaiian Man . Together, Kamae and Li'a wrote Hawaii Pia Valley Song. Kamae has also produced the documentaries The Hawaiian Way The Art and Tradition of Slack Key Music (1993) The History of the Sons of Hawaii (2004), Words, Earth & Aloha: Source of Hawaiian Music (2005), Keepers of the Flame (2005) Lahaina: Waves of Change (2007).

== Awards ==
Eddie Kamae Awards and Recognitions
Year	Presented By	Award-Recognition
1978	State of Hawaii, House of Representatives	Resolution for outstanding achievements in Hawai‘ian musical performance, research and recording
1978	National Association of Television Programming Executives	Iris Award
1978	New York International Film Festival	Award
1979	Honpa Hongwanji Mission of Hawaii	Living Treasure of Hawaii
1984	March of Dimes	No Ka Oi Award for outstanding showmanship
1989	Brigham Young University-Hawaii and the Polynesian Cultural Center	Na Makua Mahalo Ia Award for a lifetime of dedicated service to the people of Hawai‘i through musical composition and performance scholarship
1992	Hawai'i Academy of Recording Arts	Na Hoku Hanohano Lifetime Achievement Award
1993	Hawaii Delegation of the United States Congress	Joint Resolution to Eddie and Myrna Kamae for service and accomplishments in leadership, music and film
1996	Bishop Museum	Charles Reed Bishop Award for best exemplifying the spirit and purpose of Bishop Museum founder Charles Reed Bishop
2000	Commission on Culture and The Arts for City and County of Honolulu	Lifetime Achievement Award
2001	Ukulele Hall of Fame	Induction
2002	Hawaii International Film Festival	To Eddie and Myrna Kamea for their ongoing contribution of their Hawaiian Legacy Series
2005	Hawaii Governor Governor Lingle	July 24 declared Eddie Kamae Day
2005	House of Representatives, State of Hawaii	Resolution for Achievement in Hawaii Music and Film
2006	The Hawai‘ian Cultural Foundation at Pacifika New York Hawai‘ian Film Festival	Lifetime Achievement Award
2006	New York City Council, Councilman John Liu	Proclamation for Contributions to the Perpetuation of Hawaiian culture through music and film
2007	National Endowment for the Arts	NEA National Heritage Fellowship
2007	Hawaii Tourism Authority	Keep it Hawai‘i Kahili Award, recognition of perpetuation of Hawaiian culture.
2007	Hawaiian Music Hall of Fame	Inductee

== Discography ==
- Yesterday & Today, Vol. 2 (2009) CD (Hawaii Sons)
- Yesterday & Today (2008) CD (Hawaii Sons)
- This Is Eddie Kamae (2008) CD 1197 (Omagatoki Japan)
- Eddie Kamae & Friends (2006) CD 8542 (Hawaii Sons)
- Heart of the Ukulele (2004) CD 3002 (Surfside/Mahalo)
- Eddie Kamae Presents: The Best of Sons of Hawaii, Vol. 1 (2004) CD (Hawaii Sons)
- Eddie Kamae & The Sons of Hawaii (2004) CD (Hawaii Sons)
- Christmas Time With Eddie Kamae & Sons of Hawai'i (2004) CD 1014 (Hawaii Sons)
- Sons of Hawaii (1998) CD 8516 (Panini)
- Music of Old Hawaii (1962) CD Hula

== Published works ==
- Kamae, Eddie; Houston, James D (2004). Hawaiian Son. Hawaiian Legacy. ISBN 978-1-883528-28-7.

== See also ==
- Gabby Pahinui
- David "Feet" Rogers
- Sons of Hawaii
- Genoa Keawe
