= Sons of Hawaii =

US musical group

The Sons of Hawaii was a Hawaiian musical group that became popular among mainstream audiences from the 1960s through the 1990s.

== History ==
In 1960 they opened at the Sandbox in Honolulu and were soon the highest-paid Hawaiian group in the Islands. In 1961 they released their first album, "Gabby Pahinui with The Sons of Hawaii."

The group was originally formed in 1960 under the leadership of Gabby Pahinui with members Eddie Kamae, Joe Marshall and David "Feet" Rogers. Each of these musicians came to the group with years of experience in not only Hawaiian music, but many other kinds, such as American swing, jazz and Latin rhythms.

Gabby Pahinui (slack-key guitar) had been playing clubs in Hawaii for over 20 years and had a loyal following of devoted fans. Gabby played with many of the great bands and musicians of his time and the all-weekend jam sessions at his home were legendary.

Eddie Kamae had long been one of Hawaii's top ukulele players. Known for his technical wizardry and unique blend of Spanish rhythm, he toured the mainland and was a featured soloist in a show that brought the sound of the ukulele to the status of a full-fledged solo instrument.

Joe Marshall (upright bass) had been playing music since high school. He had played with the best Hawaiian musicians, and was a singer.

David 'Feet' Rogers, steel guitarist, was just 16 when he joined the band. Kamae, Pahinui and Marshall drove across the island to hear this young man play. His father was also an accomplished steel guitar player.

A few years after the group was formed they went their own separate ways until the middle to late 1960s when they reformed with the members Kamae, Marshall, Rogers, Atta Isaacs and Bobby Larson.

By the end of the 1960s the group included Kamae, Marshall, Rogers, Sonny Chillingworth and Zulu, who acted on Hawaii Five-O. In 1970, the group reassembled once more, this time to make another album. To the original four musicians was added ukulele master Moe Keale.

The group played a pivotal role in the second Hawaiian Renaissance when Kamae set out to revitalize traditional Hawaiian music by going to the rural countryside and learning from the old-timers both the music and meanings. The rural folks shared with him old family songs and their meanings. Burl Burlingame of the Honolulu Star-Bulletin describes this as:

"Although the group was a hit from the first, one of the first stumbling blocks was that none of the members spoke Hawaiian. Kamae sought the advice of Mary Kawena Pukui, legendary Bishop Museum master of the Hawaiian language, and this started him on his life's parallel journey along with music; a consuming scholarship of all things Hawaiian, and more importantly, a student of the process by which such knowledge is transmitted between generations – or not transmitted."

In 1973, Kamae brought the group back together, minus Pahinui, and added a young Hawaiian singer-songwriter named Dennis Kamakahi (Grammy Award-winning recording artist and music composer). This was the fifth Sons of Hawaii incarnation.

On November 16, 1985, Eddie Kamae and the Sons of Hawaii were featured on A Prairie Home Companion, along with the Kahelelani Serenaders, Taj Mahal with Carlos Andrade and his band, and the Kamehameha High School Glee Club, as well as Chet Atkins and Johnny Gimble plus the show regulars. This is one of their few live recordings. Songs played by The Sons of Hawaii include "Hanakeoki", "E Hihiwai" and the classic "Ulili E (Sandpiper)".

In 1989, the seventh and final incarnation of the Sons of Hawaii consisted of Kamae, Marshall, George Kuo, Braddah Smitty, Dennis Kamakahi; sometimes Gary Haleamau and steel player Paul Kim would join them. When Joe Marshall died, Ocean Kaowili became the bass player. This was the last Sons of Hawaii, as Eddie Kamae retired in 1992.
