= Leland Isaacs Sr. =

American musician (1929–1983)

Leland "Atta" Isaacs Sr. (1929–1983) was an American, Hawaiian slack-key composer, known for his C major tuning ("Atta's C," C-G-E-G-C-E), and for his work with Gabby Pahinui.

== See also ==
- Sons of Hawaii
