= Gabby Pahinui =

American Hawaiian musician (1921–1980)

Background information
- Also known as: Gabby Pahinui, Pops Pahinui
- Born: Charles Kapono Kahahawai Jr. April 22, 1921
- Origin: Lahaina, Maui, Territory of Hawaii (now Hawai'i, United States)
- Died: October 13, 1980 (aged 59) Honolulu, O'ahu, Hawai'i, United States
- Occupation: Musician
- Instruments: Slack-key guitar, Steel guitar
- Spouse: Emily Kauha Pulipuli (m. 1938)
- Website: gabbypahinui.com

Philip Kunia Pahinui (Hawaiian pronunciation: [pɐhinui]; April 22, 1921 – October 13, 1980), known as Gabby Pahinui, was an American Hawaiian slack-key guitarist and singer of Hawaiian music. He also went by Pops Pahinui.

== Early life and family ==
Gabby Pahinui was born Charles Kapono Kahahawai Jr. on April 22, 1921, in Lahaina, Maui, Territory of Hawaii, into a struggling family that sold leis. He was later hānaied (informally adopted) with his brother and one of his sisters to Emily and Philip Pahinui, and they were raised in the impoverished district of Kaka'ako in Honolulu in the 1920s ("all tin roofs and kinda falling apart"). He took the name Philip Kunia Pahinui. Pahinui spent his childhood supporting his family by selling newspapers and shining shoes. He dropped out of school after the fifth grade at the Pohukaina school.

Pahinui married Emily Pulipuli Pahinui in 1938. He was age 17 and she was 19. They remained married until his death in 1980 and they had 13 children.

== Early career ==
Pahinui landed a gig as a back-up guitarist for Charley "Tiny" Brown. He quickly mastered the steel guitar (kīkā kila) even learning to read music. Because most musicians of the time only played in bars, Pahinui also formed a drinking habit that stuck with him throughout his life.

At the 1st Annual Seattle Slack Key Guitar Festival, Pahinui's son, Cyril Pahinui, related a story about how Pahinui got his name. In his early career, Pahinui played steel guitar with an orchestra. The standard costume for the gig was gabardine pants—hence his name.

Cyril told another story, from when Pahinui was diving for coins thrown from ships coming to the piers (a common youth activity in Kakaako) : "His hair was kinky, so after swimming and diving for coins, the water would just roll off. So everyone started calling him "Gabardine Hair". He also took to wearing gabardine pants, reinforcing "Gabby" as a nickname."

Though a skilled player of the steel guitar (invented in Hawaii before Blues slide guitar), Pahinui is most known for his mastery of traditional Hawaiian slack-key guitar (Kī Hōʻalu -"key slackened"- downtuned, usually to an open-string chord with low bass notes, then finger-picked) and his beautiful, expressive vocals. Pahinui learned slack-key from Herman Keawe whom Pahinui acknowledges as being "the greatest slack-key player of all time." Herman, like Pahinui, lived in the Kaka'ako area.

In 1946, Pahinui made his first recording, "Hi'ilawe," for the Bell Records label. This may be the first record of a Hawaiian song with slack-key guitar and it inspired many local musicians. The following year came "Hula Medley," the first record of a slack-key guitar instrumental. During this period, Pahinui made two other influential sides for Bell, the vocal "Wai O Ke Aniani" and the instrumental "Key Koalu" (a misspelling of "Kī Hō'alu"), plus another version of "Hi'ilawe" for Aloha Records.

Pahinui's "Hula Medley," recorded in 1947, was inducted into the U.S. National Recording Registry (2011 group of 25) for cultural, historical or aesthetical significance.

Pahinui played with many of the great bands and musicians of his time, including Lena Machado and Ray Kinney. He appeared on Hawaii Calls, a popular international radio show that began in the 1930s. Eventually, Pahinui moved his family to Waimānalo, Oahu, which had become a popular second home location for many musicians. The all-weekend jam sessions at the Pahinui home were legendary.

Examples of his session work from the late 1950s through the 1960s can be found on the two volumes of Hawaiian Slack Key Guitar (Waikiki Records 319 and 320) and two more LPs titled Kani Ka Pila! Let's Play Music! Volumes 1 and 2 (Hula Records 517, 1966; Hula 531, 1969). These are combo recordings (steel guitar, slack key guitar, uke, bass, vocals, sometimes percussion) made with bandmates such as Atta, Barney, and Norman Isaacs, Charles Kaipo Miller, and a young Peter Moon, and they reflect the style of nightclub music popular around Waikīkī at the time.

A 1961 solo recording session was organized by Hawaii-raised Dave Guard of The Kingston Trio, who was a great admirer of Pahiuni's music. The recording features only Pahinui, with bass and 'ukulele backing, doing some of his classic material, including new versions of three of his four 1946–47 tracks. However, no record company was interested in the material at the time, and it was not released until 1978. The final package was Pure Gabby (Hula 567), a two-record set, one LP consisting of the music and the second of an interview conducted by Guard.

Despite his success, Pahinui still had financial trouble. He made ends meet by working for City and County of Honolulu road crews, doing pick and shovel work alongside fellow Hawaiian musician Eddie Kamae.

== Later career ==
The Hawaiian Renaissance of the 1970s launched a cultural reawakening of all things Hawaiian. Gabby played a very important part in the rise of this Hawaiian Cultural Renaissance. First there were the albums recorded through the 1960s with the enormously popular and influential Sons of Hawaii, which he started with 'ukulele virtuoso Eddie Kamae: their self-titled debut album (Hula HS 503, 1961); Music of Old Hawai'i (Hula HS 506, 1964); and Folk Music of Hawai'i (Panini 1001, 1971).

Starting in 1972, Gabby made four albums with what came to be called the "Gabby Band." The first album featured him backed by four of his sons plus old friends Leland "Atta" Isaacs and bassist Manuel "Joe Gang" Kupahu, but the group eventually expanded to include Sonny Chillingworth, younger-generation players Peter Moon and Randy Lorenzo, and mainland admirer Ry Cooder. The albums are:

- Gabby (1972; often called "Brown Gabby" or "The Brown Album" because of its sepia cover photo)
- Rabbit Island Music Festival (1973)
- Gabby Pahinui Hawaiian Band, Vol 1 (1975)
- Gabby Pahinui Hawaiian Band, Vol 2 (1976)

In 1979, Gabby was named one of the Living Treasures of Hawaii, by the Honpa Hongwanji Mission of Hawaii.

== Death and legacy ==
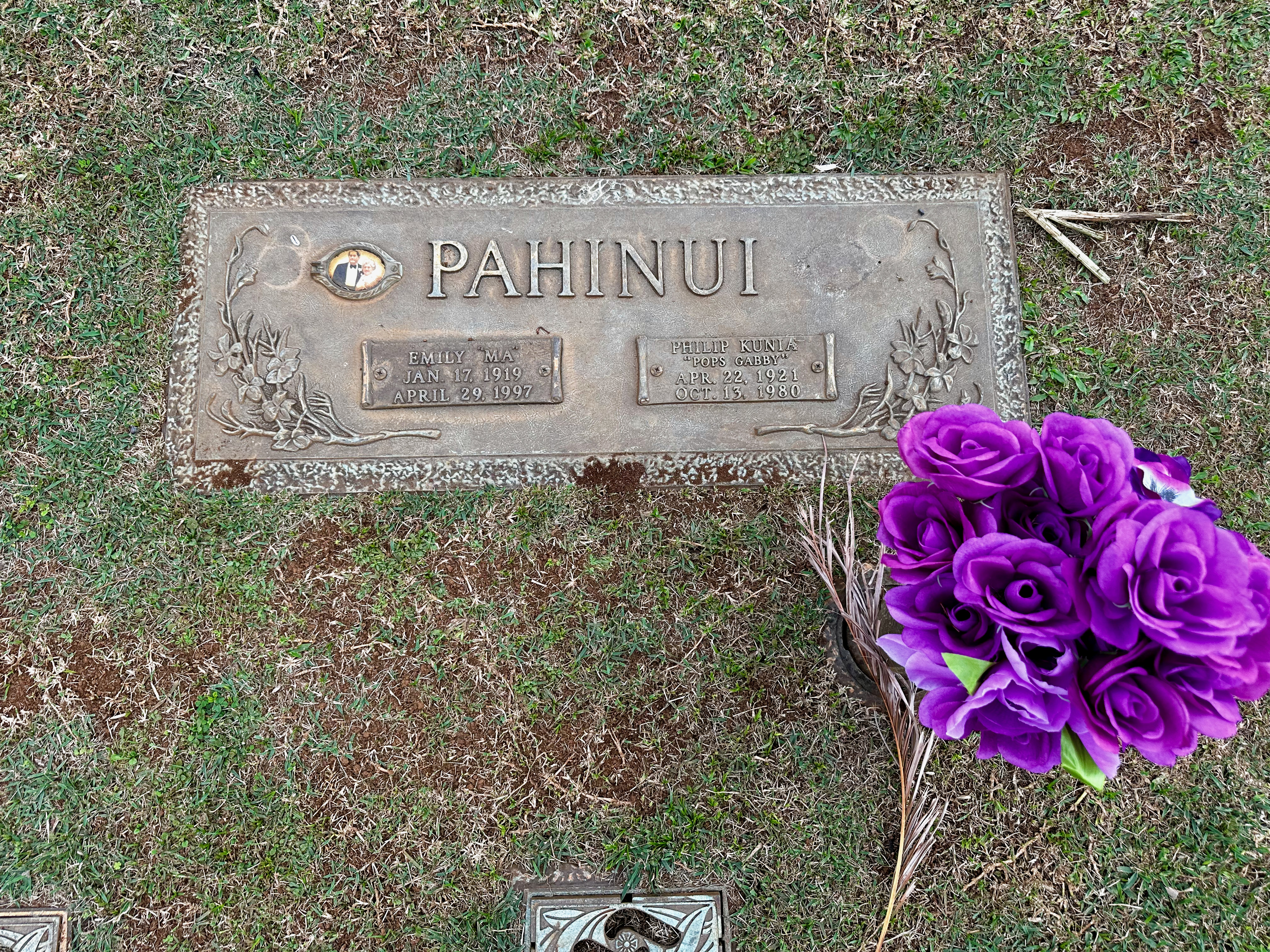
Pahinui's final resting place alongside his wife, at Hawaiian Memorial Park Cemetery

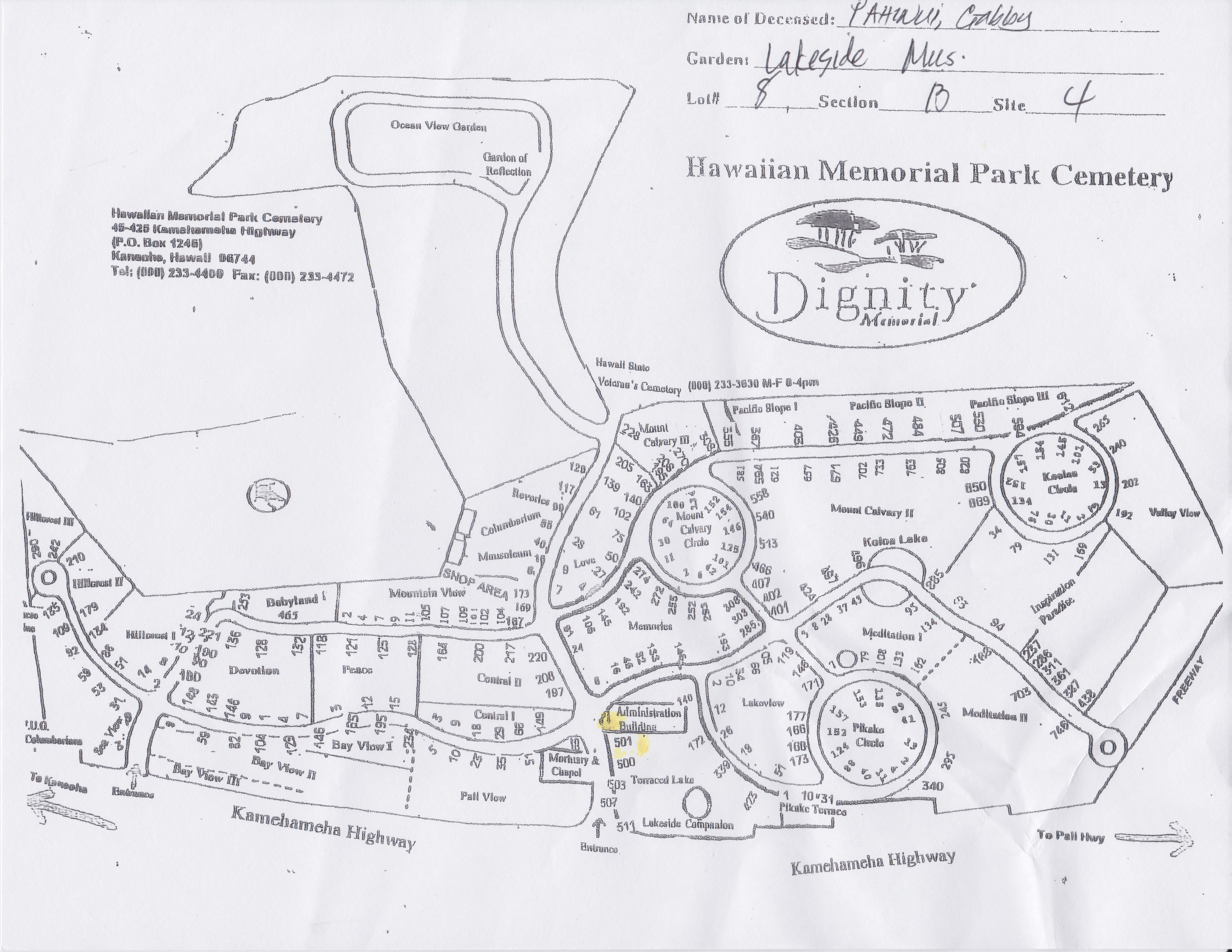
Location of Pahinui's grave is right at the entrance of Hawaiian Memorial Park Cemetery

Pahinui died of a stroke while playing golf on October 13, 1980; he was only 59 years old. The Honolulu Star Bulletin newspaper reported after Pahinui's death that, "The thing about Gabby Pahinui ... was not only that he was an outstanding musician and entertainer, and a central figure – maybe THE central figure – of the Hawaiian Renaissance in the '70s, but that he was an inspiration to others. Thousands of Hawaiian kids learned that they were worthy as a people because of Gabby's example."

Pahinui was mentioned in Israel Kamakawiwoʻole's famous performance of "Somewhere Over the Rainbow/What a Wonderful World" on his 1993 Facing Future album. In the opening moments of the song, Kamakawiwo'ole can be heard saying, "'Kay, this one's for Gabby."

Pahinui received the Hawai'i Academy of Recording Artists Lifetime Achievement Award in 1997. He received a second Hawai'i Academy of Recording Arts Lifetime Achievement Award in 2009 for his work as a member of the Sons of Hawaii. Pahinui was inducted into the Hawaiian Music Hall of Fame in 2002.

Pahinui's children were active in the Hawaiian music scene, notably Cyril Pahinui (1950–2018), James "Bla" Pahinui (1942–2019), and Martin Pahinui (1951–2017).

=== Resting place ===
Pahinui is buried at Hawaiian Memorial Park Cemetery in Kaneohe, Hawaii in the Lakeside Garden musician area (lot 8, section B, site 4).
