= Genoa Keawe =

Hawaiian musician (1918–2008)

'Aunty' Genoa Keawe
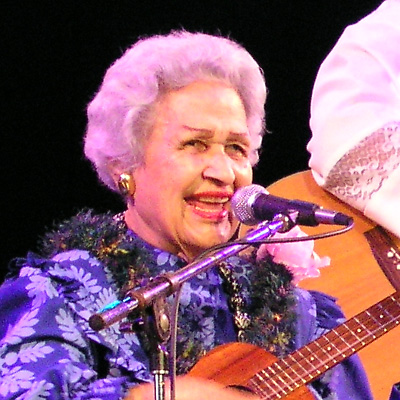

Background information
- Born: Genoa Leilani Adolpho; October 31, 1918
- Origin: Honolulu, Hawaii, U.S.
- Died: February 25, 2008 (aged 89)
- Genres: Hawaiian Music; Easy Listening; Pop
- Occupation: Musician
- Instruments: Ukulele, Vocals

'Aunty' Genoa Leilani Adolpho Keawe-Aiko (October 31, 1918 – February 25, 2008) was a Hawaiian musician. Keawe was born on the island of Oʻahu in the Kakaʻako district of Honolulu and grew up in Lā'ie. She was an icon in Hawaiian music and a mainstay on the Hawaiian music scene for more than 60 years. She captivated local and visitor audiences alike. She had a large repertoire of traditional Hawaiian standards and Hapa Haole tunes. Many local artists include Keawe among their influences.

In 2005, she received an honorary doctorate (Doctor of Humane Letters) from the University of Hawaiʻi.

== Early life ==
Genoa Leilani Adolpho's early years were full of moving about. She was born in 1918 in Kakaʻako in a stable. In her childhood her family moved about several occasions. Before she was ten years old she'd already lived on Kauaʻi for several years and had moved back to Kakaʻako. By the time she was about 10 years old, her family had moved to Laʻie.

This move to Laʻie would help facilitate the phenomenal music career that would highlight her life. Keawe always loved to sing ever since she was a little girl. In Laʻie she received her early musical training as a member of a local Church of Jesus Christ of Latter-day Saints (LDS Church) choir. It was in choir that she built up her repertoire, knowledge and appreciation of music. She attended school until the 8th grade. She and her husband, the late Edward Puniwai Keawe-Aiko, whom she married in 1935, had twelve children.

Keawe was a lifelong member of the LDS Church.

== Career ==
She began performing music professionally prior to World War II at officers' clubs and at bandstand shows in Kailua. Eventually Keawe landed a radio show on KULA singing with John Kameaaloha Almeida. Like most other musicians, Keawe could not make a living solely on music. She also made money in her early years as a lei seller and as a taxi driver.

Her long musical career had taken her throughout the islands and around the world. She had played at luʻaus, lounges, bars, and on numerous radio and television shows.

Keawe had taken great pride in preserving "ʻōlelo Hawaiʻi". She learned to speak Hawaiian through her mother-in-law, who spoke Hawaiian as her first language. She arguably has perhaps the widest repertoire of traditional Hawaiian meles. Like many old-time Hawaiian singers and musicians, she played her music by ear.

She had been recording music professionally since 1946. Her original record label was with the 49th State Hawaii record company. She then went on to record with Hula Records. After a falling out with the company she founded her own record label, Genoa Keawe Records, to record her music and the music of her family and friends. Along with the band, who had often been known as Aunty Genoa's Hawaiians, she helped to perpetuate Hawaiian music.

Keawe is a recipient of a 2000 National Heritage Fellowship awarded by the National Endowment for the Arts, which is the United States government's highest honor in the folk and traditional arts.

== Death ==
After years of health complications, Keawe died in the morning of February 25, 2008, at the age of 89.
