= Waikoloa =

Waikoloa is an area and more specifically an ahupuaʻa in the South Kohala District of Hawaii.

Waikoloa may refer to:

- Waikoloa Beach, makai or ocean side of Waikoloa
- Waikoloa Challenger, or Hilton Waikoloa Village USTA Challenger, a tennis tournament held in the area
- Waikoloa Championships, a tennis tournament held in the area
- Waikoloa Village, mauka or mountain side of Waikoloa
