= Hokuloa Church (Puakō) =

Coordinates: 19°58′3″N 155°50′48″W

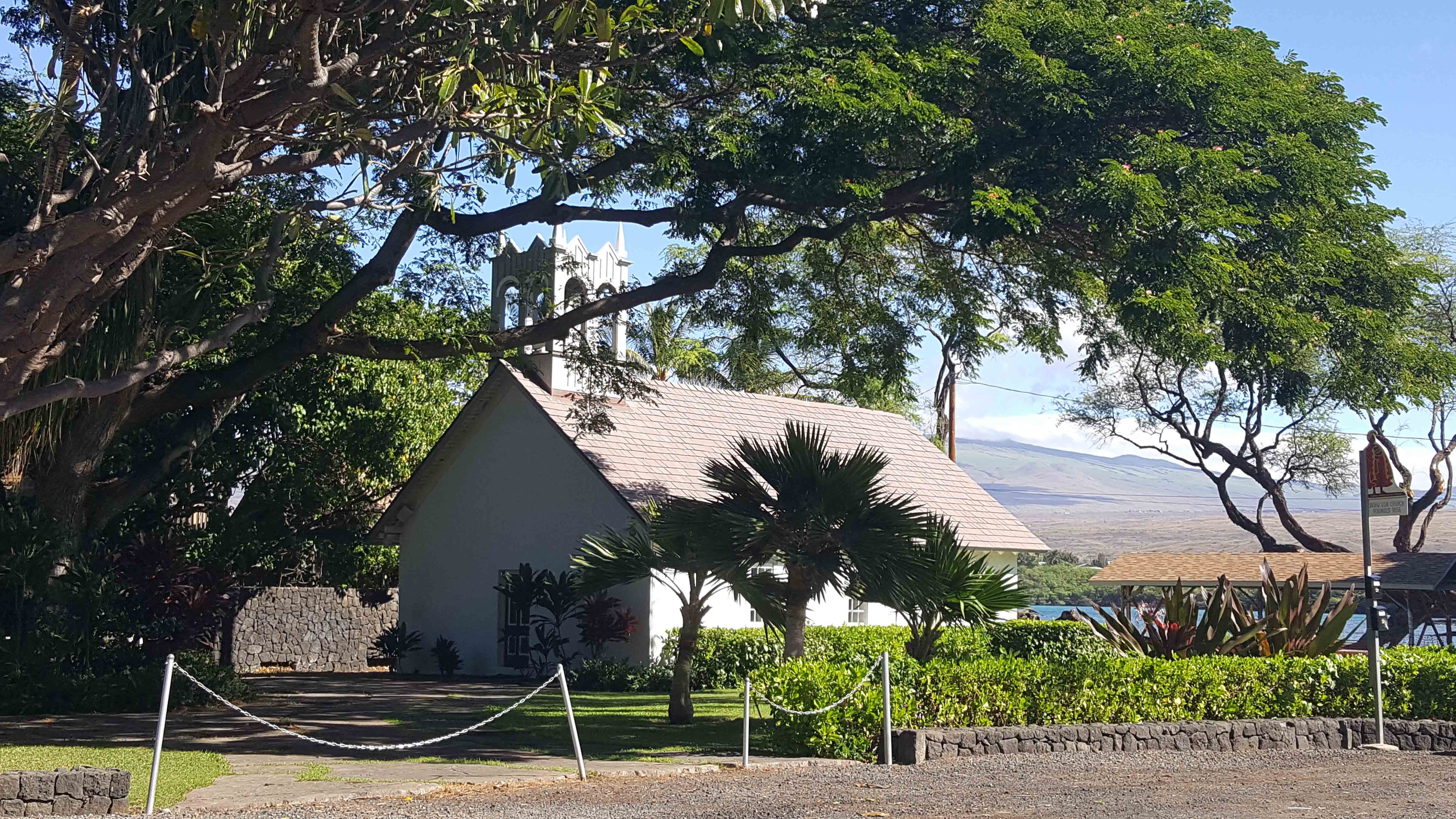
The Hokuloa Church by the sea

Hokuloa Church is a Christian church in Puako on the west coast of the Island of Hawaii, Hawaii, United States. It was founded in 1860 by Lorenzo Lyons. Hokuloa is from the Hawaiian words: Hoku meaning a star, and Loa "distant".

== Overview ==
The Hokuloa Church has walked with the people of the village of Puakō, on the west coast of the Big Island of Hawaii, USA. Puako is a rocky beach with little land crops available, but the Native Hawaiians have lived there with salt and fish from the coast, in exchange for crops from other regions.

In 1832, Lorenzo Lyons, who later would write the words of the popular Hawaiian song "Hawaii Aloha," arrived from Boston to the Island of Hawaii as the United States Congregational Church's missionary and settled in Waimea. He often visited Puako and cultivated a large congregation there. He was given land by Kamehameha III in 1858, and started to construct a church, which was completed in 1860. A school attached to the church was soon built, and sugar cane cultivation began around the area. Puako was a large village of mainly native Hawaiians.

However, the sugarcane plantation was closed in 1914, leaving only seven families in Puako. In the 1920s, the school caught fire, and was never rebuilt. The church was occasionally used from 1914 to 1965, but was largely neglected.

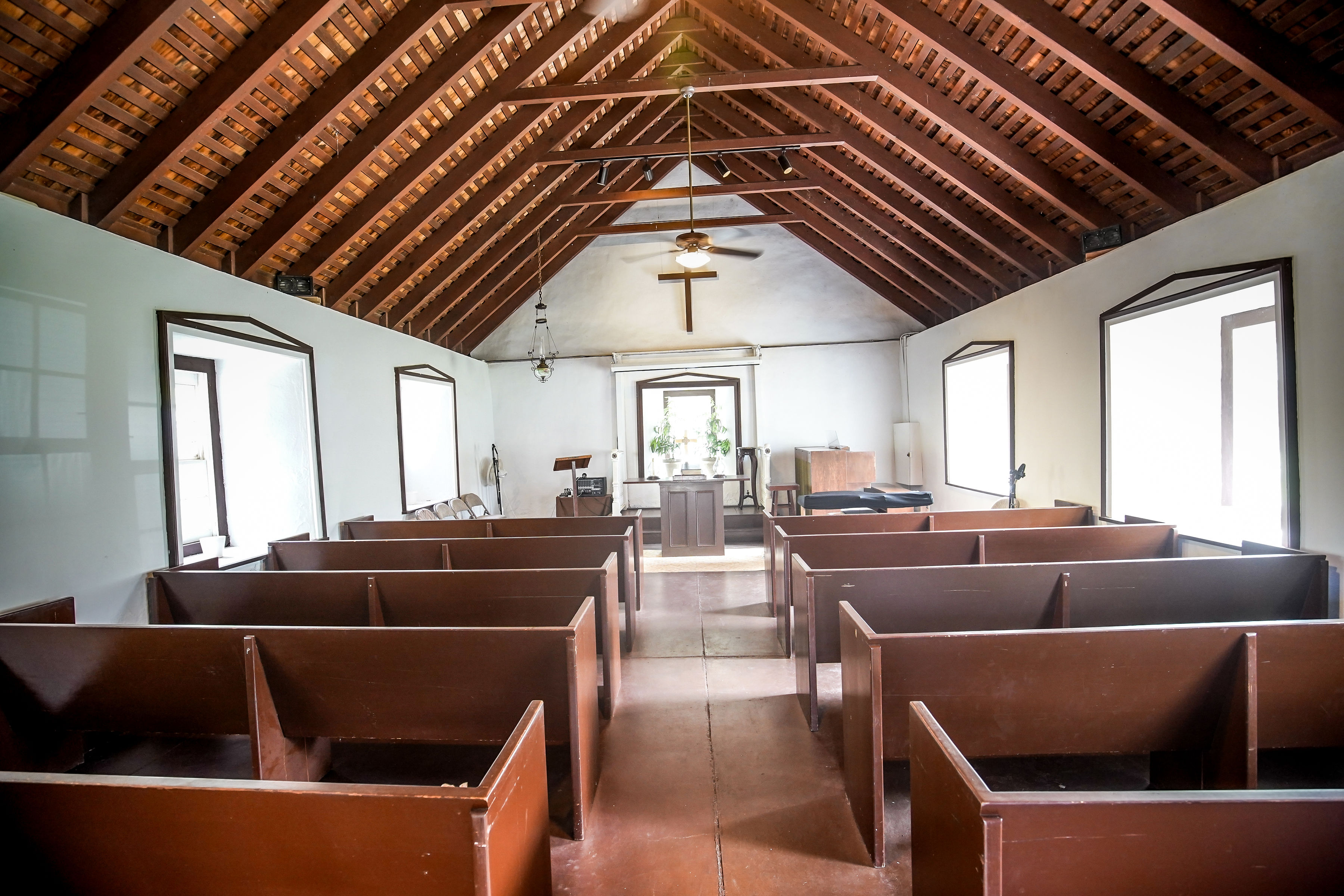
The inside view of the Hokuloa Church, Puako, Hawaii

By the 1950s, Puako Beach Drive was built, and the land there was divided into 163 lots, where many non-native Hawaiian people moved. In the 1950s and 1960s, it took two hours to reach Kawaihae just north, but in 1964 the road was paved, and in 1975 Hawaii State Route 90 was completed from Kailua-Kona in the south to Kawaihae. Soon the renovation of the Hokuloa Church began, and was continued until the 1990s.

The U.S. Congregational Church has recently been united with other churches to become the United Church of Christ. The Hokuloa Church welcomes weddings of non-members.

The Hokuloa Church, Waialea Beach and the General Store, are some noted places in Puako.

== See also ==
- Asa Thurston and the Mokuaikaua Church he built
- Hiram Bingham and Kawaiahao Church he built
