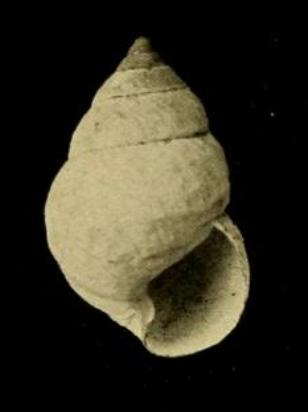
- Shell of Amastra spicula (holotype)

Scientific classification
- Kingdom: Animalia
- Phylum: Mollusca
- Class: Gastropoda
- Order: Stylommatophora
- Family: Amastridae
- Genus: Amastra
- Species: A. spicula

Binomial name
- Amastra spicula C. M. Cooke, 1917

Synonyms
- Amastra (Amastrella) spicula C. M. Cooke, 1917 alternative representation

= Amastra spicula =

Species of gastropod

Amastra spicula is a species of air-breathing land snail, a terrestrial pulmonate gastropod mollusc in the family Amastridae.

== Description ==
The length of the shell attains 18.9 mm, its diameter 10.1 mm.

(Original description) The shell is imperforate or minutely perforate, ovate-conic, and solid, with a glossy whitish coloration in its fossil state. The spire is conic with slightly convex outlines, subtly contracted toward the apex.

The embryonic whorls are nearly flat and uniformly marked with fine, minute striae. The third and fourth whorls are slightly more convex, coarser, and less regularly sculpted, showing growth-wrinkles. The penultimate whorl is marked by very irregular striae, with faint revolving striae present above, gradually becoming maleate below. The body whorl exhibits a malleate texture and a distinct angle just above the periphery, a feature that continues as a subtle ridge above the sutures of the fourth and fifth whorls.

The aperture is relatively large, with a strongly curved outer margin. The columella is very narrow and slender, with the upper portion of its outer margin closely appressed to the shell. The columellar fold is weak, oblique, and terminates abruptly near the margin of the columella.

== Distribution ==
This species is endemic to Hawai, occurring near Waikoloa.
