= Albert Brown Lyons =

American botanist (1841–1926)

Albert Brown Lyons (born Waimea, Hawaiian Kingdom, April 1, 1841; died Detroit, Michigan, April 13, 1926) was a notable analytical and pharmaceutical chemist who also published works on geology, plant names, and genealogy.

== Family and early life ==
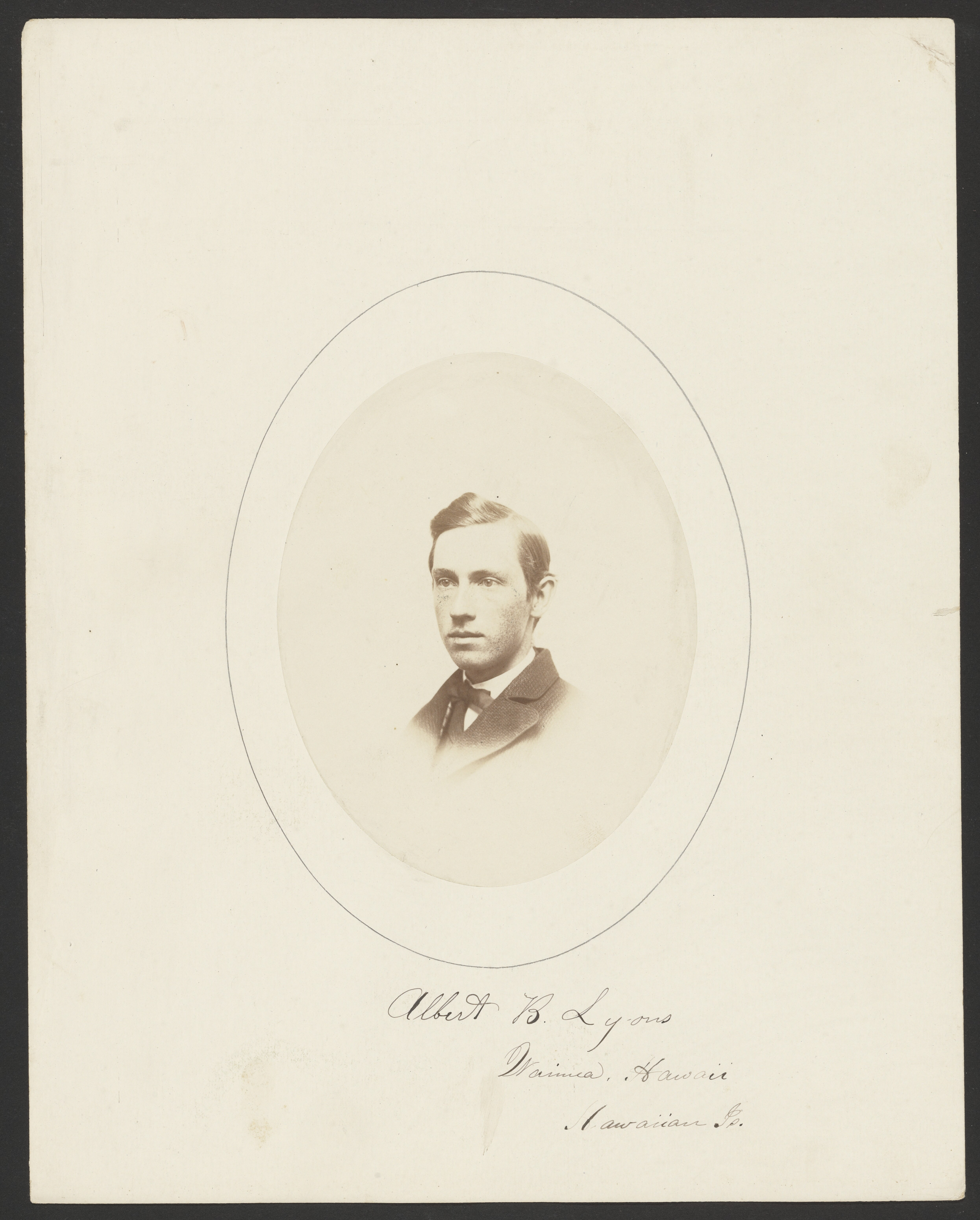
Albert B. Lyons, 1865 (photography by George K. Warren)

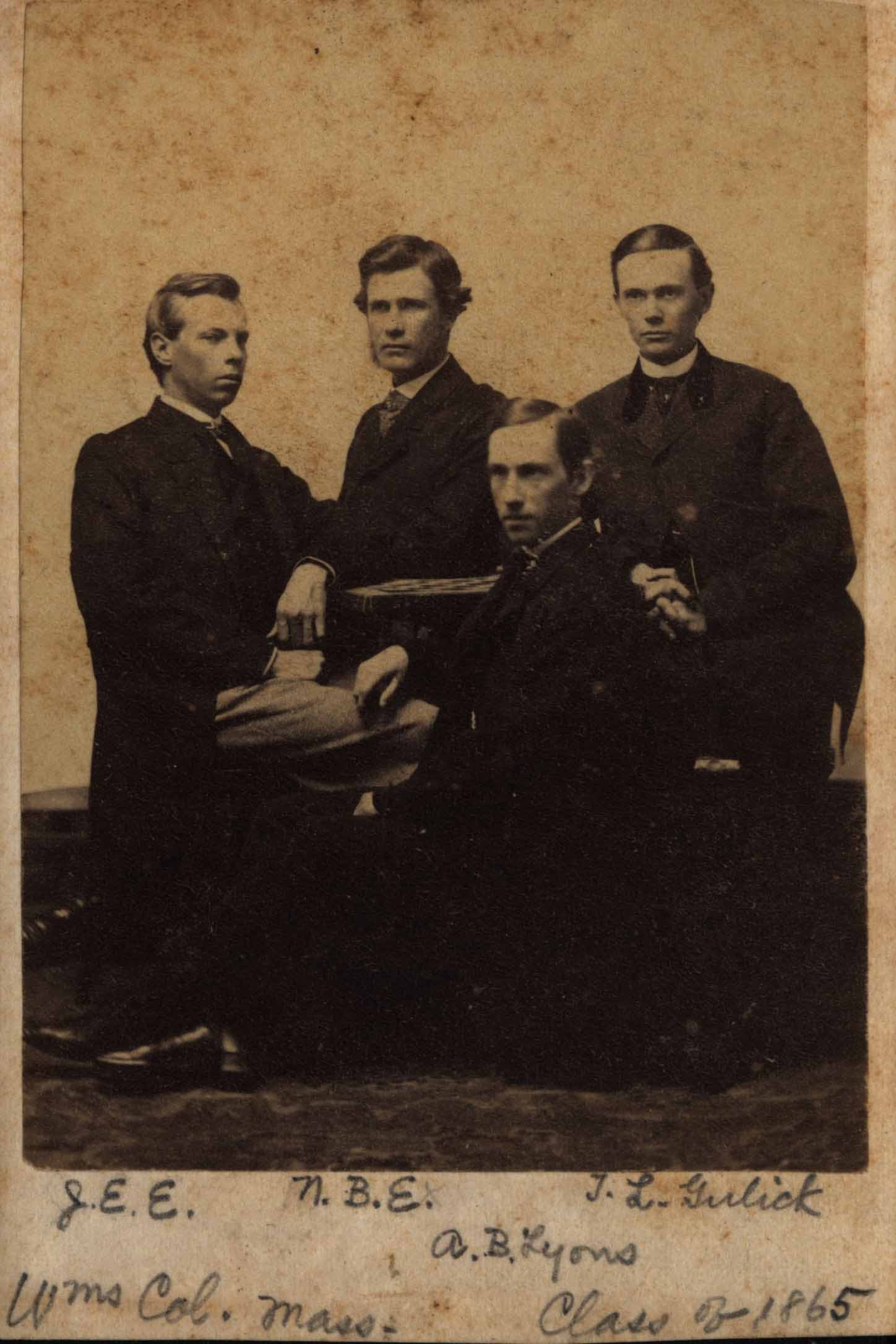
Justin Edwards Emerson, Nathaniel Bright Emerson, Thomas Lafon Gulick and Albert Brown Lyons (seated), Williams College, 1865

Lyons was the son of Reverend Lorenzo Lyons, a Congregationalist missionary who wrote the popular Hawaiian song Hawaii Aloha. He attended Oahu College for two years, spent a year as a teacher and tax assessor, and then entered Williams College in Massachusetts, graduating in 1865.

After his graduation, he spent a year teaching chemistry and physics at Eagleswood Military Academy in Perth Amboy, New Jersey. He then went on to the medical school at the University of Michigan, where his chief interest was in chemistry. A course in pharmaceutical chemistry taught by Albert Benjamin Prescott was particularly influential on him.

== Career ==
After receiving his M.D., Lyons was hired in 1868 by the Detroit College of Medicine (which later would merge with other institutions and become part of what was eventually Wayne State University) as an assistant to Samuel Duffield; the next year Duffield left to found a company that became the drug manufacturer Parke, Davis & Co., and Lyons took his job as the chair of the chemistry department. Lyons taught and operated a pharmacy until 1881, when Parke, Davis & Co. hired him as an analytical and consulting chemist.

While at Parke, Davis Lyons made many important advances in pharmaceutical procedures. He developed standard preparations for a number of drugs which were marketed as "Normal Liquids"; his standards, with minor changes, became industry standards. Methods he developed for the manufacture of cocaine he was able to develop into a general assay method for the quantitative extraction of alkaloids. In 1887 he published his "Manual of Pharmaceutical Assaying" which remained the standard work on the subject for many years.

In 1887 he started The Pharmaceutical Era, an early journal of pharmaceuticals.

In 1888 Lyons was hired as government chemist for the Hawaiian Kingdom; there he also taught chemistry and other scientific subjects at his alma mater Oahu College. Among his students there was Hiram Bingham III, best known for bringing world attention to Machu Picchu. While in Hawaii he made a study of the geology of the islands, published in a number of papers, and collected hundreds of local shells.

After the overthrow of the Hawaiian monarchy Lyons returned to Detroit and in 1898 became supervising chemist and secretary of the pharmaceutical manufacturing firm Nelson, Baker, & Co., a position he held until his death.

Lyons was a member of the revision committee of the United States Pharmacopeial Convention from 1900 to 1920.

Lyons was known as an authority on ferns in particular, but he had an interest in the naming and classification of plant species and published a dictionary of plant species giving their scientific and common names in 1900. Including Plant Names, Scientific and Popular: Including in the Case of Each Plant the Correct Botanical Name in Accordance with the Reformed Nomenclature, Together with Botanical and Popular Synonyms ... (1907)

In 1912 Lyons served as the Honorary President of the American Pharmaceutical Association.

== Personal life ==
Lyons married Edith Eddy, daughter of Rev. Zachary Eddy, on April 25, 1878. Their daughter Lucia Lyons (1879-1973) worked as a missionary in China; their son Albert E. Lyons (1885-1980) became a teacher of Spanish and French.

He published a genealogical work on the Lyon or Lyons family in Massachusetts and their descendants, Lyon Memorial: Massachusetts Families, Including Descendants of the Immigrants William Lyon, of Roxbury, Peter Lyon, of Dorchester, George Lyon, of Dorchester, with Intro. Treating of the English Ancestry of the American Families, in 1905.
