= Irene ʻĪʻī Brown Holloway =

Hawaiian philanthropist

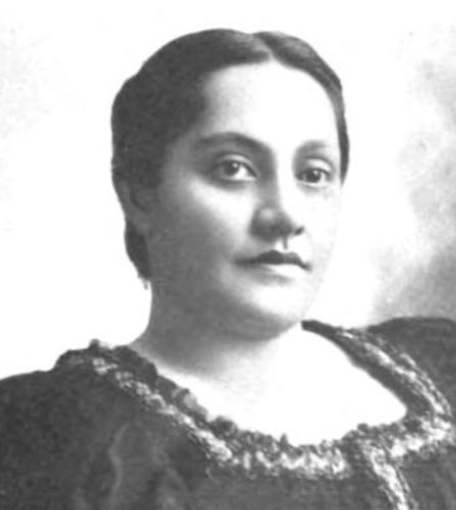
- Irene ʻĪʻī Brown Holloway, from a 1923 publication
- Born: Irene Haalou Kahalelaukoa-Kamamalu ʻĪʻī; September 30, 1869; Waipio, Hawaii
- Died: August 26, 1922 (aged 52); Honolulu, Hawaii
- Occupation: Philanthropist
- Parent: John Papa ʻĪʻī
- Relatives: Kenneth Francis Brown and Zadoc Brown (grandson}

Irene Īʻī Brown Holloway (September 30, 1869 – August 26, 1922) was a Hawaiian philanthropist.

== Early life ==
Irene Haalou Kahalelaukoa-Kamamalu ʻĪʻī was born in Waipio, on Oahu, the daughter of John Papa ʻĪʻī and Maria Kamaunauikea Kapuahi I'i. Her father was advisor to King Kamehameha III, and later a judge. After her father's death in 1870, she was raised in the home of Reverend Charles McEwen Hyde, an American missionary. She attended Kawaiaha'o Seminary and the Punahou School.

== Career ==
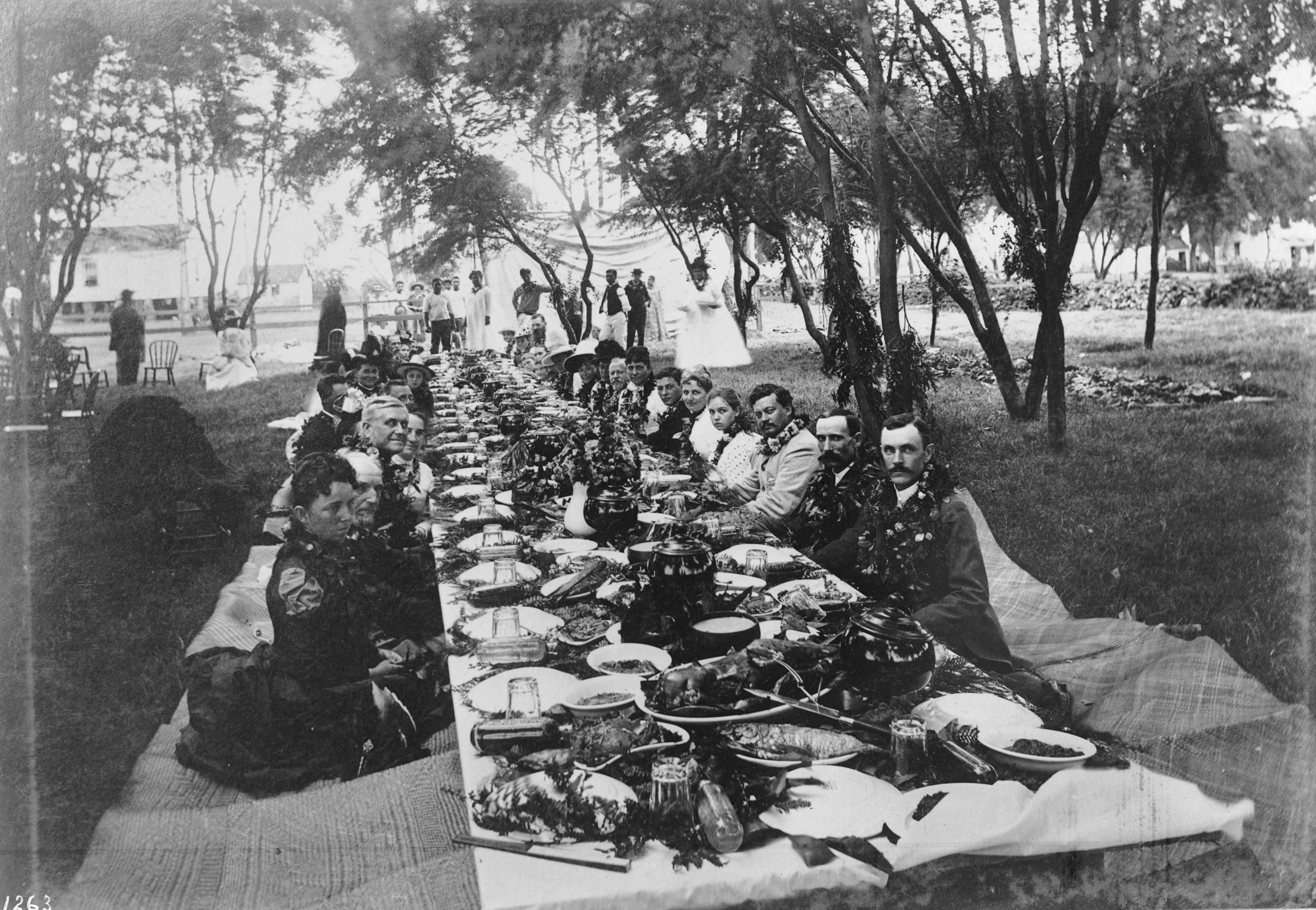
Luau at the Brown residence, Waipiʻo, Oʻahu, ca. 1890

Irene ʻĪʻī was a social hostess and philanthropist in Hawaii. She was one of the first women elected to the Hawaiian Board of Missions. She served on charity boards, was active in the Kawaiaha'o Church and the Daughters of Hawaii, and was a trustee of the Kawaiaha'o Seminary. She visited and brought gifts for the elderly residents of the Lunalilo Home. Her inheritance from her father's estate, including the proceeds of land sold to the United States government for the Pearl Harbor Naval Station, and her ex-husband's role as trustee of the estate, were matters of protracted legal attention.

== Personal life and legacy ==
Irene ʻĪʻī married twice. In 1886, at age 17, she married Charles Augustus Brown, a white American businessman from Massachusetts. They had three children together. She divorced Brown in 1898, and married Carl Sheldon Holloway in 1901; he died in 1915. In widowhood she lived in Waimea. She died in Honolulu in 1922, aged 52 years, after a short illness. In her will, she left funds which still support the Lunalilo Home.

Her sons were George (1887–1946) and Francis (1892–1976), who was awarded the Croix de Guerre in World War I, and became a golf professional and developer of the Keawaiki Bay residential complex. Politician Kenneth Francis Brown was her grandson. A section of Mililani Mauka on Oahu is named after Irene Īʻī Brown Holloway.
