= Puakō, Hawaii =

Census-designated place in Hawaii, U.S.

Puakō
- Census-designated place
- Location in Hawaii County and the state of Hawaii
- Coordinates: 19°58′3″N 155°50′48″W
- Country: United States
- State: Hawaii
- County: Hawaii

Area
  - Total: 5.44 sq mi (14.09 km^{2})
  - Land: 3.21 sq mi (8.31 km^{2})
  - Water: 2.23 sq mi (5.78 km^{2})
- Elevation: 0 ft (0 m)

Population (2020)
  - Total: 267
  - Density: 83.3/sq mi (32.15/km^{2})
- Time zone: UTC-10 (Hawaii-Aleutian)
- ZIP code: 96743
- Area code: 808
- FIPS code: 15-65150
- GNIS feature ID: 0363460

Puakō (Hawaiian for 'sugarcane blossom') is a census-designated place (CDP) in Hawaiʻi County, Hawaii, United States. The population was 772 at the 2010 census, up from 429 at the 2000 census. The epicenter of the 2006 Kiholo Bay earthquake was some 6 miles (10 km) offshore of the village.

== Geography ==
Puakō is located on the west side of the island of Hawaii at 19°58′3″N 155°50′48″W (19.967500, -155.846667). It is bordered to the west by the Pacific Ocean and to the east by Waikoloa Village. Hawaii Route 19 forms the eastern border of Puakō and leads northeast 14 miles (23 km) to Waimea and southwest 28 miles (45 km) to Kailua-Kona.

According to the United States Census Bureau, the Puakō CDP has a total area of 17.6 square miles (45.7 km^{2}), of which 10.3 square miles (26.7 km^{2}) are land and 7.3 square miles (19.0 km^{2}), or 41.56%, are water.

== Demographics ==
Historical population
Census	Pop.	Note	%±
2020	267		—
U.S. Decennial Census

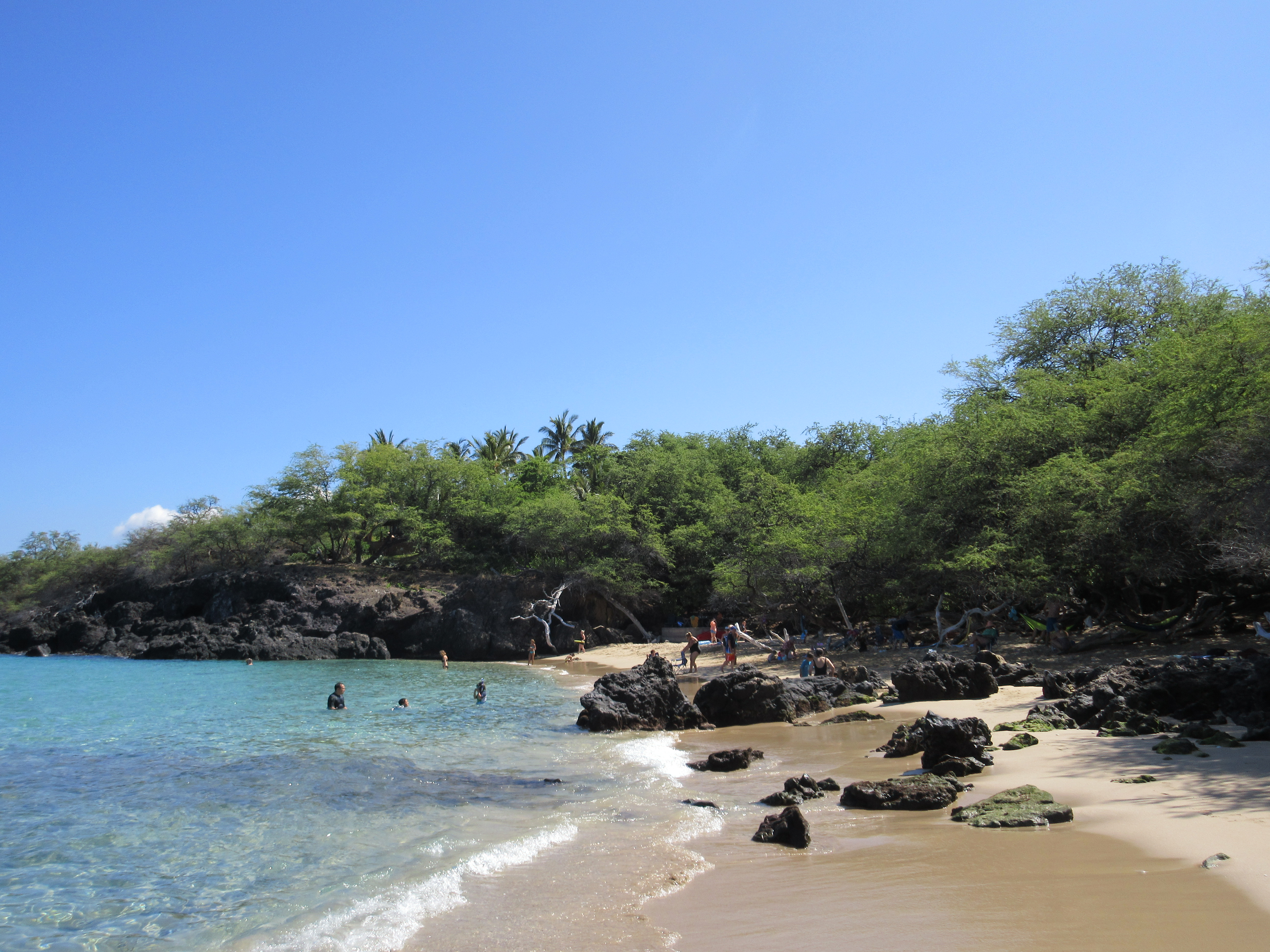
Waialea Beach in Puakō, which is locally known as "Beach 69" in reference to the number on a utility pole that formerly stood adjacent to the parking lot.

As of the census of 2000, there were 429 people, 215 households, and 118 families residing in the CDP. The population density was 41.6 inhabitants per square mile (16.1/km^{2}). There were 702 housing units at an average density of 68.1 per square mile (26.3/km^{2}). The racial makeup of the CDP was 71.56% White, 11.42% Asian, 4.43% Pacific Islander, and 12.59% from two or more races. Hispanic or Latino of any race were 3.26% of the population.

There were 215 households, out of which 14.9% had children under the age of 18 living with them, 42.3% were married couples living together, 7.9% had a female householder with no husband present, and 45.1% were non-families. 31.6% of all households were made up of individuals, and 4.7% had someone living alone who was 65 years of age or older. The average household size was 2.00 and the average family size was 2.43.

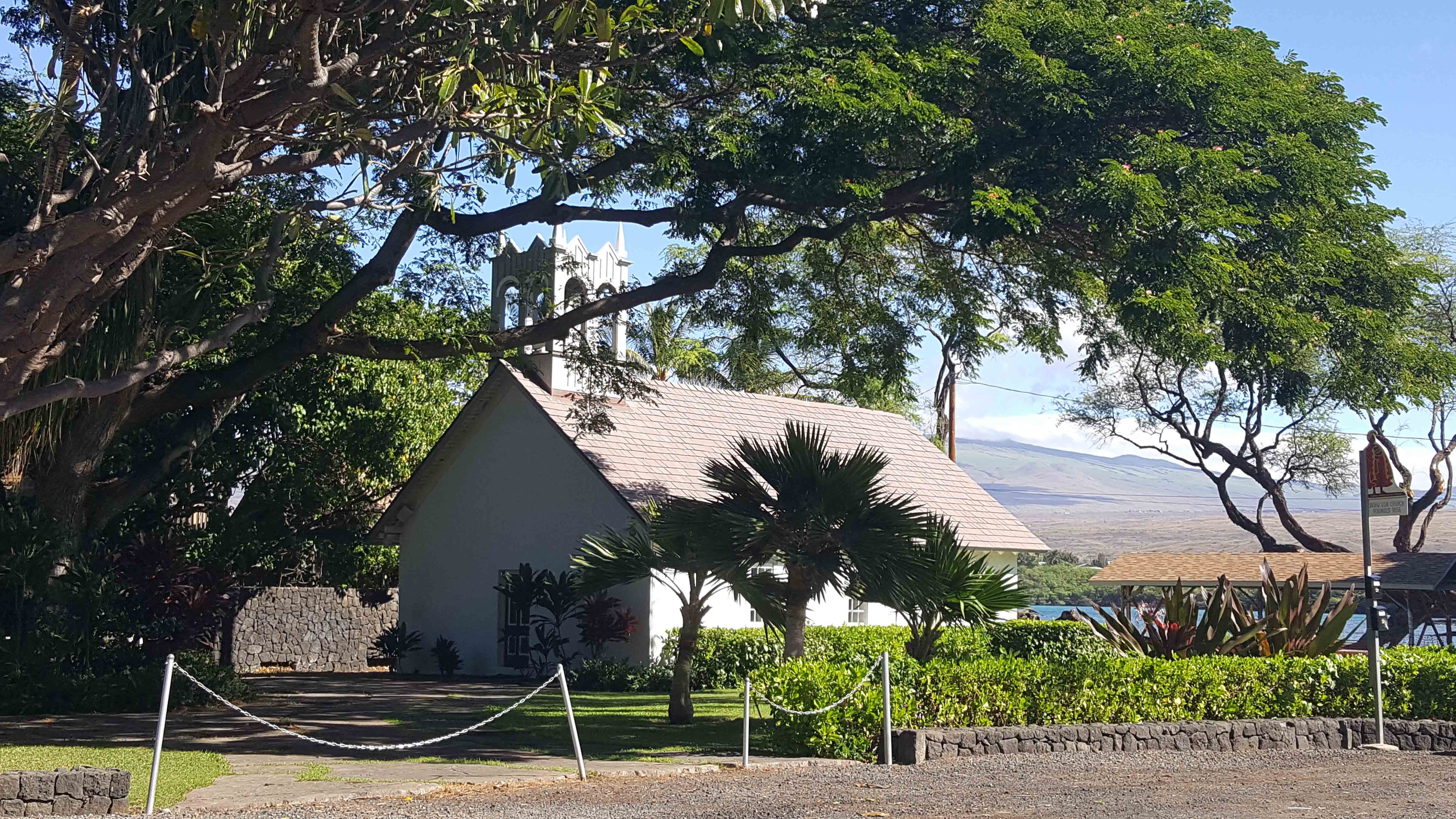
Hokuloa Church in Puakō, built in 1856

In the CDP the population was spread out, with 11.7% under the age of 18, 4.9% from 18 to 24, 26.6% from 25 to 44, 41.7% from 45 to 64, and 15.2% who were 65 years of age or older. The median age was 48 years. For every 100 females, there were 109.3 males. For every 100 females age 18 and over, there were 111.7 males.

The median income for a household in the CDP was $60,250, and the median income for a family was $81,176. Males had a median income of $37,500 versus $31,250 for females. The per capita income for the CDP was $63,857. None of the families and 3.1% of the population were living below the poverty line, including no under eighteens and 4.2% of those over 64.

== See also ==
- The Fairmont Orchid
- Hokuloa Church (Puako)
