= Kenneth Francis Brown =

American politician

Kenneth Francis Kamu’ookalani Brown (October 28, 1919 – February 7, 2014) was an American politician who was a significant figure in the political, business, and cultural life of the Hawaiian Islands in the decades from the 1960s through the 1990s. Of Hawaiian ancestry, Brown's impact was felt through his role in the Hawaii State Senate, his influence on health delivery especially to the native Hawaiian population, and his engagement with Hawaiian cultural values.

== Hawaiian Lineage ==
He was born on October 28, 1919, the son of George ʻĪʻī Brown and Julia Davis Long Brown (née White). His father was a member of an influential Hawaiian family. His mother was the offspring of a prominent New England family whose patriarch was Nelson Davis White, a factory-owner in Winchendon, Massachusetts. His uncle was Francis Hyde ʻĪʻī Brown, his grandmother was Irene ʻĪʻī Brown Holloway, and his great-grandfather was John Papa ʻĪʻī, a major political figure in nineteenth-century Hawaii and a key historical resource for the study of Hawaiian history through his autobiographical narrative, Fragments of Hawaiian History (1866–1870). He had two older brothers, George ʻĪʻī Brown Jr. (1915–1993) and Zadoc White Brown (1917–2006).

== Political career ==
Brown was an unsuccessful candidate for Lieutenant Governor of Hawaii in 1966, and served in the Hawaii State Senate from 1968 to 1974. Politically, Brown was influential on environmental and land development issues, and on the role of tourism in relationship to local social and cultural contexts. Brown managed the passage of long-term environmental protection policies, and advocated for opportunities through which the hotel industry might support the preservation of Hawaiian culture and historic sites. Brown’s position on tourism in Hawaii, made public at the 1984 Governor’s Tourism Conference, represents a key statement for the role of tourism in the state.

== The Queen's Health Systems ==
Brown’s other major role in Hawaii was as chair of the Board of Trustees of the Queen’s Health Systems. During the period of his tenure in the 1980s and 1990s Brown emphasized preventive medicine as well as cultural and social initiatives, especially those serving the native Hawaiian community. The latter included support for the Polynesian Voyaging Society’s programs to improve the well-being of native youth through re-connections to traditional ways and values. Brown has been honored by the Polynesian Voyaging Society through the inscription of his name on a plaque across the pale kai of the Hōkūle’a canoe, and by the naming of a star—Kamu'ookalani—designated as a marker to help guide wayfinders home.

== Cultural Influence ==
Brown influenced the Hawaiian Renaissance through his connections with major figures and leaders of that movement, including George Kanahele, author of Ku Kanaka, Stand Tall: A Search for Hawaiian Values (1986), the Hawaii Maritime Center, and Project WAIAHA. He has been remembered as a unique thinker, in his merging of native and contemporary values. His remarks on the "malama ethic" as a State Senator reflect a core statement of these values.

== Directorships, honors, and awards ==
Brown’s significant roles and honors include: service on the boards of directors of Amfac, the Hawai’i Nature Center, Oceanic Cablevision, Emerald Hotels Corporation, Tongg Publishing Company, Pan Pacific Development Company, Hawaiian Airlines, the Historic Hawai’i Foundation, and the John A. Burns Foundation; chairmanship or presidency of the Mauna Lani Resort, the Hawai’i Community Development Authority, the Nature Conservancy, the Board of Governors of the East-West Center, the Hawaii Maritime Center, and the Bishop Museum Board of Directors; election to the Japanese Order of the Rising Sun, the College of Fellows of the American Institute of Architects, the honorary Doctor of Humanities of the University of Hawaiʻi, and the Red Cross Humanitarian of the Year; recipient of the honors of Living Treasures of Hawai'i by Honpa Hongwanji Mission of Hawai’i, the Charles Reed Bishop Medal of the Bishop Museum, the David Malo Award from the Rotary Club, and the Kama’aina of the Year by the Historic Hawai’i Foundation. His service included philanthropic and cultural contributions to Hawaiian and other communities, among them the founding of the Friends of the Future foundation, the co-founding of the Native Hawaiian Hospitality Association, and the establishment of the Kenneth F. Brown Asia Pacific Culture and Architectural Design Award.

== Hawaiian Ali'i Memorial ==
Brown died on February 7, 2014. State flags flew at half staff, as a mark of respect by the Senate for Brown's memory, and Brown was recognized in a motion honoring his lifelong devotion to the people of Hawai'i by the Hawai'i State Senate on February 14, 2014. Brown's life was celebrated on March 20, 2014, at a gathering at the Royal Mausoleum of Hawaii, the first such event in a century to honor a member of the Hawaiian ali'i—Ku i ka Mana.
