= Waikoloa Championships =

Defunct tennis tournament
- Event name: Waikoloa Championships (2001–02)
- Tour: WTA Tour (2001–02)
- Founded: 2001
- Abolished: 2002
- Editions: 2
- Location: Waikoloa Village, Hawaiʻi, United States

The Waikoloa Championships was a WTA Tour tournament held in 2001 and 2002 in Waikoloa Village, Hawaiʻi. It was a Tier IV event and was played on outdoor hardcourts. Yearly prize money of the tournament was $140,000.

It was held at the same venue as the USTA Waikola Challenger, Kohala Tennis Garden.

== Past finals ==
=== Singles ===
Year	Champion	Runner-up	Score
2001	(France) Sandrine Testud	(Belgium) Justine Henin	6–3, 2–0, retired
2002	(Zimbabwe) Cara Black	(United States) Lisa Raymond	7–6 (1), 6–4

=== Doubles ===
Year	Champions	Runners-up	Score
2001	(Slovenia) Tina Križan (Slovenia) Katarina Srebotnik	(Belgium) Els Callens (Australia) Nicole Pratt	6–2, 6–3
2002	(United States) Meilen Tu (Venezuela) María Vento-Kabchi	(South Africa) Nannie de Villiers (Kazakhstan) Irina Selyutina	1–6, 6–2, 6–3
