= Waikoloa Beach =

Beach in Hawaii, USA

Coordinates: 19°54′55.45″N 155°53′14.65″W

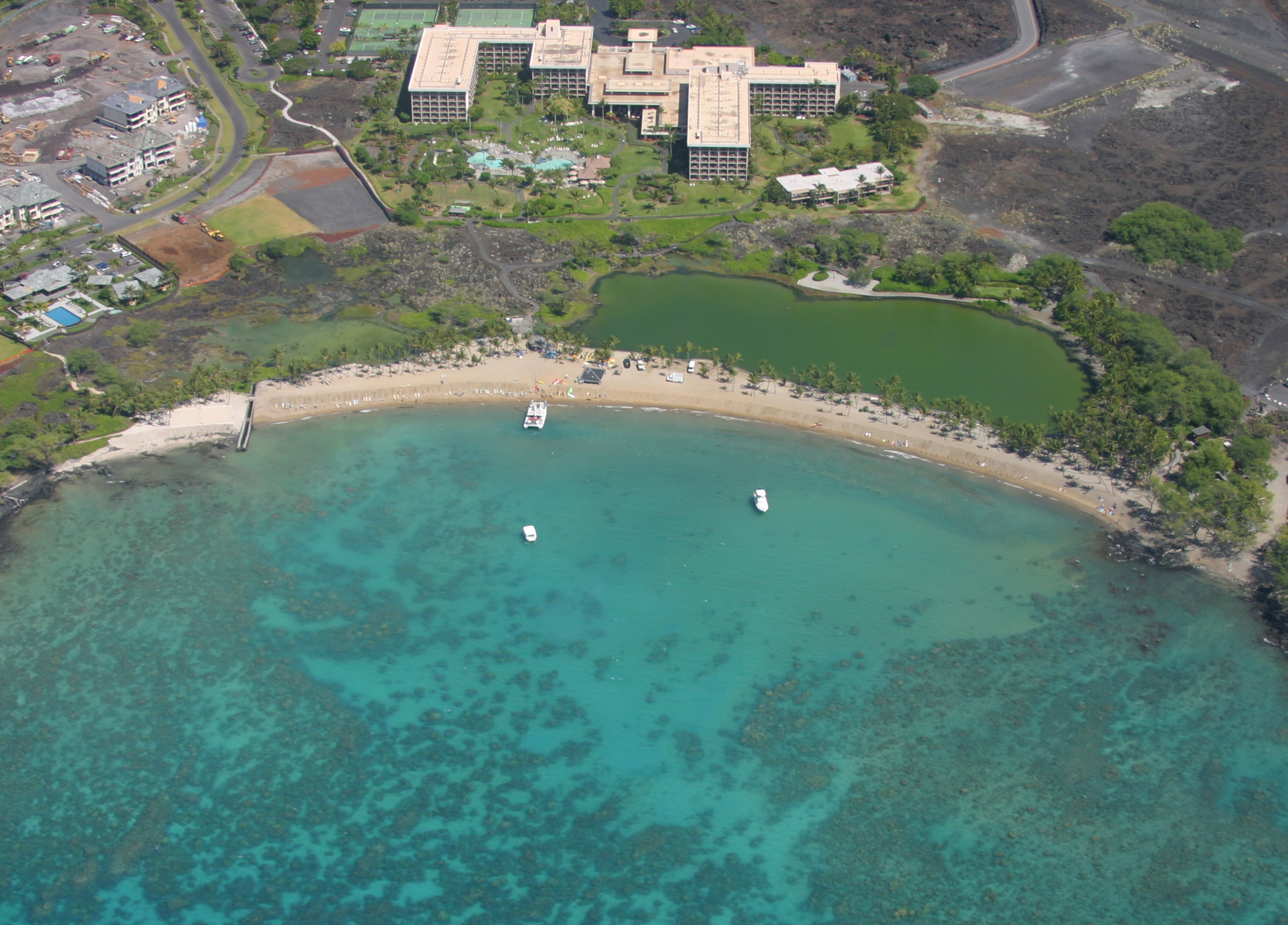
Aerial view of Waikoloa Beach and the Kuʻualiʻi and Kahapapa Fishponds

Waikoloa Beach is an area located on the South Kohala coast on the island of Hawaii and is located in the census-designated place of Puako. It can be confused for Waikoloa Village, a CDP in the same "ahupuaʻa" and is also known as "Waikoloa".

The area is home to many notable cultural and geologic features of the ancient Hawaiian culture including aquaculture fishponds, anchialine ponds and petroglyphs.

== Ala Kahakai ==
Ala Kahakai or "trail by the sea" is the name for the ancient pathway that runs along the coastline in the Waikoloa area that linked important entities in the Hawaiian culture including communities, temples, fishing areas, etc. The Ala Kahakai, estimated to be 175 miles (282 km) long, is commonly called "King's Trail".

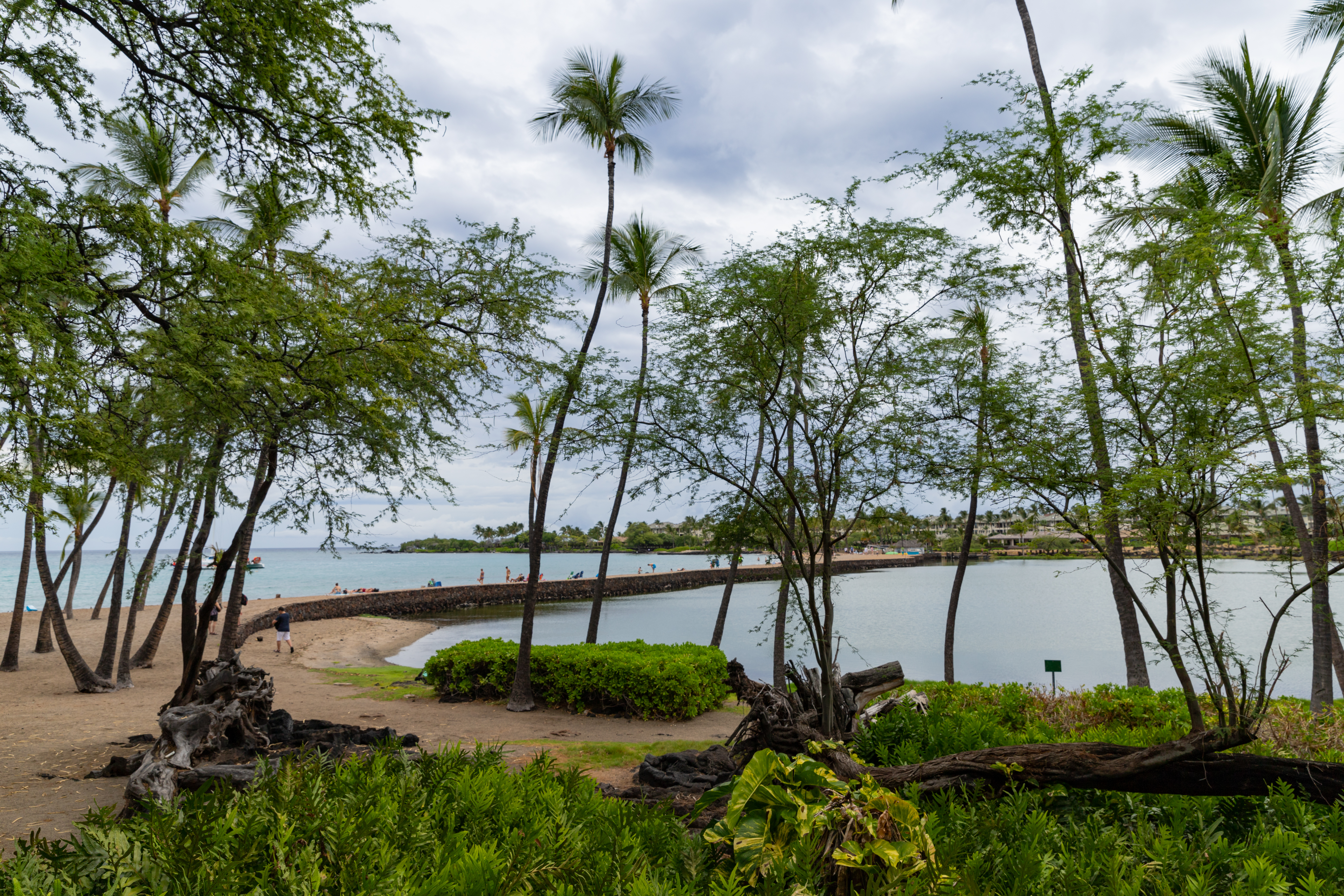
Waikola beach in Anaehoomalu Bay, Big island, Hawaii

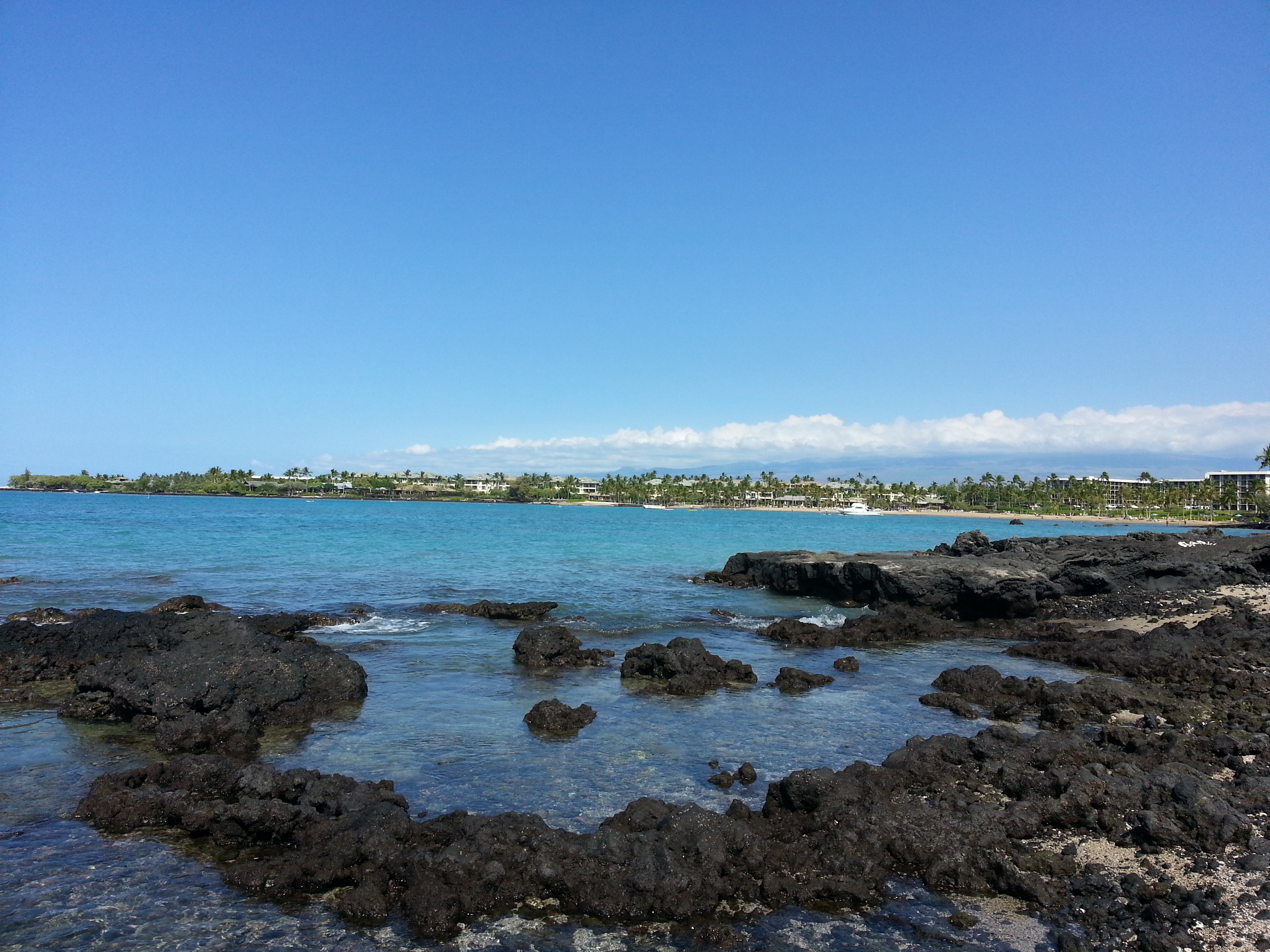
Volcanic rock along Anaehoomalu Bay

== Anaehoomalu Bay ==
ʻAnaehoʻomalu Bay, also known as A-Bay, is a palm fringed beach, shallow water bay located on the South Kohala coast on the island of Hawaii. ʻAnaehoʻomalu is best known for its sunsets, snorkeling and historic royal fishponds. The nearest town is Waikaloa Village, which used to be owned by Parker Ranch.

It is the location of the Lavaman Triathlon.

== Anchialine ponds ==
The anchialine ponds of Waikoloa are part of Hawaiian culture and were preserved in 1985 as the Waikoloa Anchialine Pond Preservation Area maintained by the University of Hawaii. The brackish water lava pools located just at the coastline are fed by both freshwater springs from rain water and sea water making the ponds a unique microclimate suitable for a various small fishes, crustaceans, mollusks and tiny red shrimp.

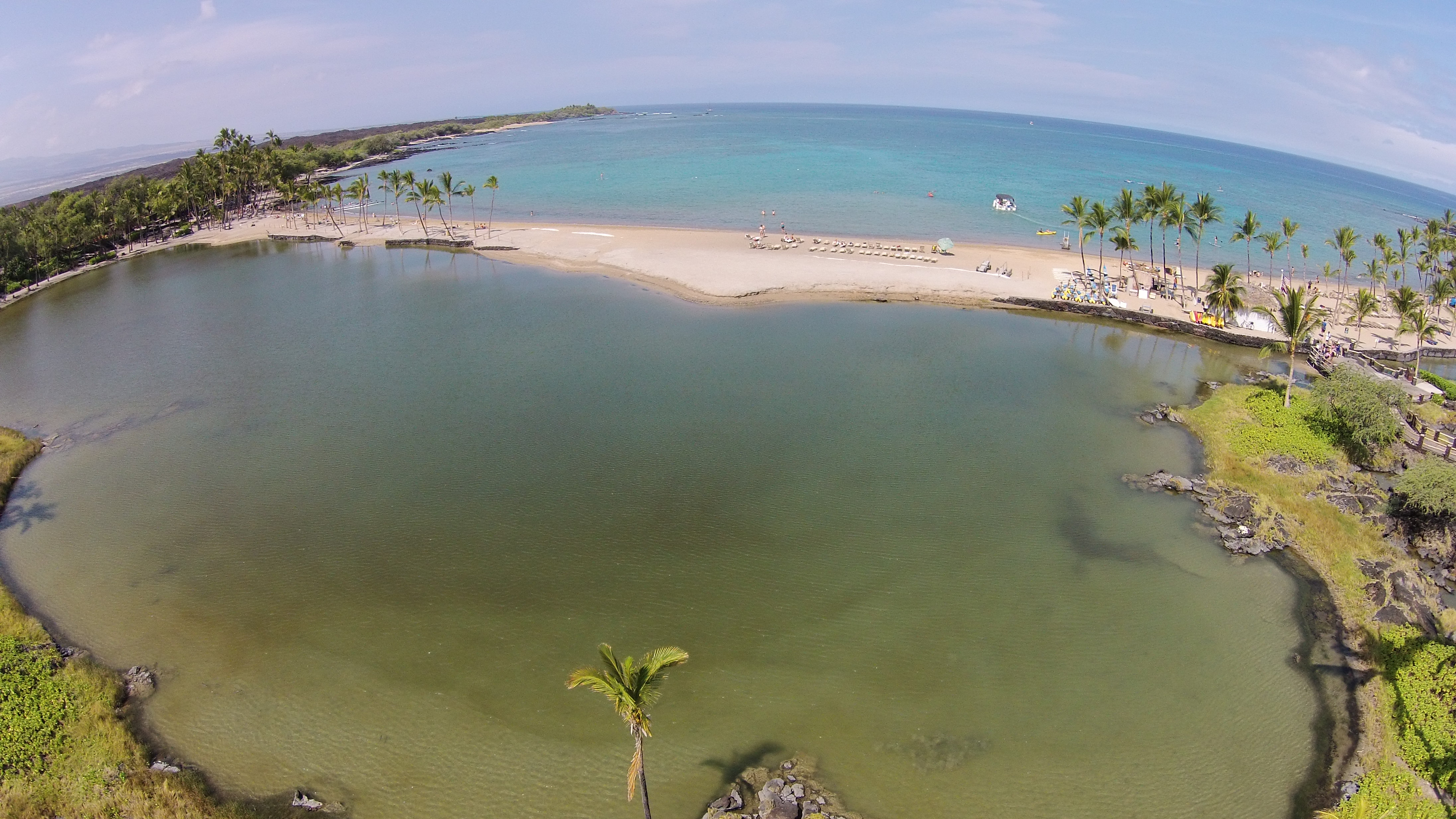
Aerial view of the Anaehoʻomalu Bay Fish Ponds

== Kuʻualiʻi and Kahapapa Fishponds ==
The Kuʻualiʻi and Kahapapa Fishponds are located just behind the Waikoloa Beach in Anaehoʻomalu bay. Historically, it is understood that Anaehoʻomalu was a center of thriving aquaculture. The two ponds were part of complex of fish farms, carefully tended by ancient Hawaiian people.

== Hilton Waikoloa Village ==
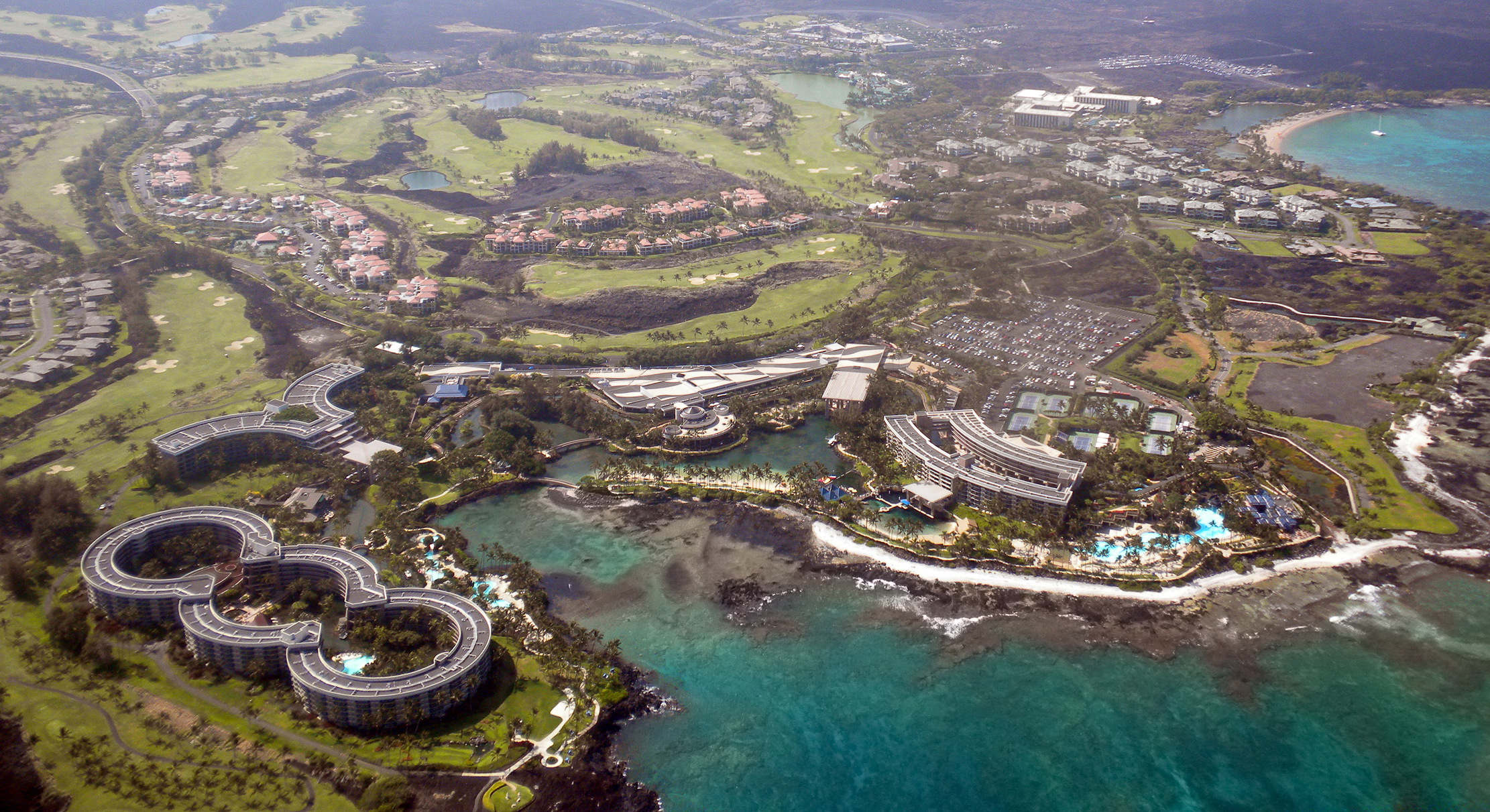
Hilton Waikoloa Village

The Hilton Waikoloa Village is built on 62 acres (250,000 m^{2}) and has 1240 rooms and suites with tropical gardens, waterfalls, lagoons and waterways. The resort features the Kohala Tennis Garden and other gardens, artworks, and statues. It was originally developed in 1988 as the Hyatt Regency Waikoloa with Japanese investment, however was sold to Hilton Hotels & Resorts in 1994. The popular game show Wheel of Fortune has taped at the resort in 1996, 2008, and 2014. The "Buddha Point" is a popular spot for sunset viewing.

It also serves as the setting for the Nickelodeon game show Paradise Run, and hosted the Pokémon World Championships in 2007, 2010, and 2012.

== Petroglyphs ==
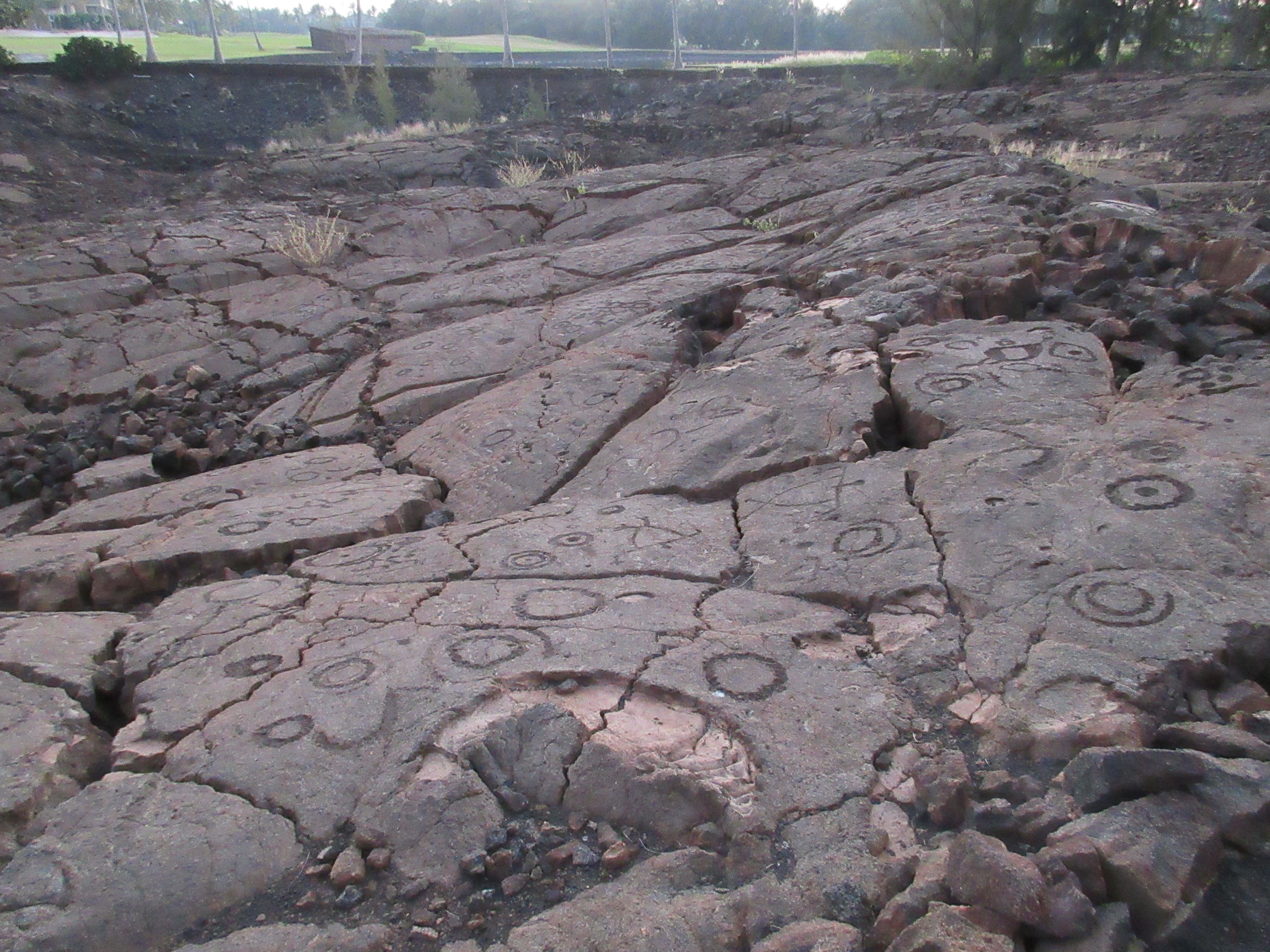
A small portion of the Waikoloa Petroglyph field

There are approximately 30,000 historically significant petroglyphs, or stone carvings, in Waikoloa. They are potentially the closest thing to a written language that Ancient Hawaiians used. Although some petroglyphs are identifiable as human or animal shapes, many are more obtuse and abstract, with their meanings likely lost to history. The majority of the petroglyphs are from the Fifteenth through Eighteenth Centuries; interspersed with these drawings are messages from Nineteenth Century visitors that are written in the modern Hawaiian language
