= Lorenzo Lyons =

American missionary

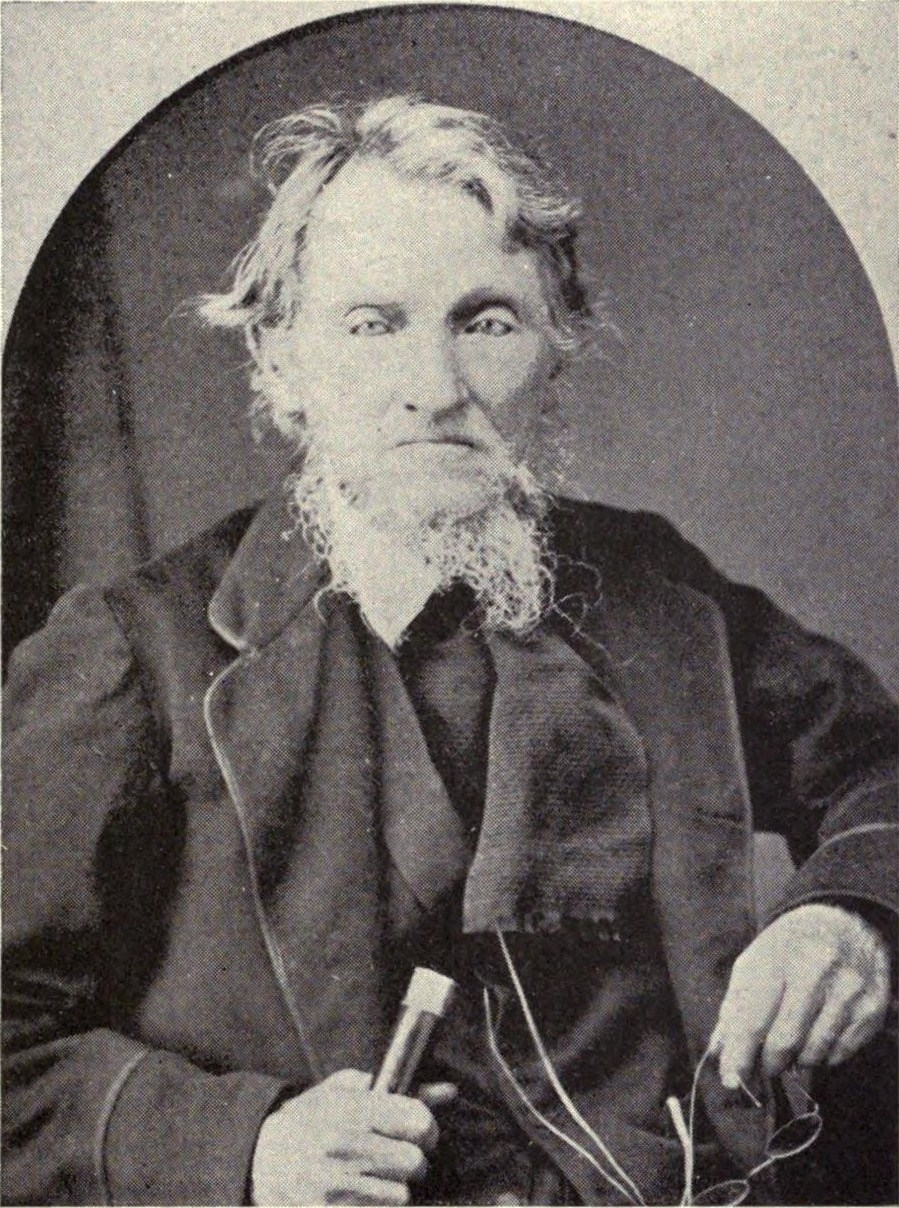
- Lorenzo Lyons circa 1880
- Born: April 18, 1807; Colrain, Massachusetts
- Died: October 6, 1886 (aged 79); Waimea, Hawaii County, Hawaii
- Other names: Makua Laiana
- Known for: Missionary to Hawaii
- Spouses: Betsy Curtis; Lucia Smith

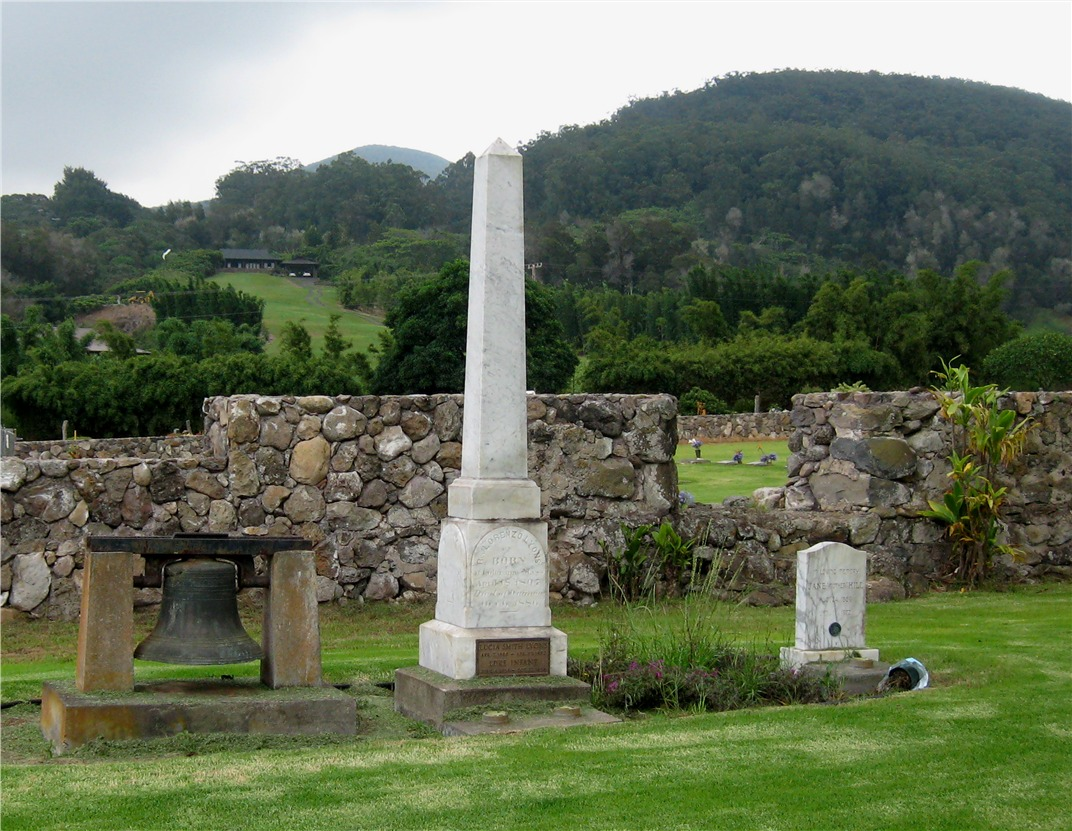
His grave site.

Lorenzo Lyons or "Makua Laiana" (April 18, 1807 – October 6, 1886) was an early missionary to the Kingdom of Hawaii. He was a songwriter who wrote the lyrics of "Hawaiʻi Aloha", which was inducted into the Hawaiian Music Hall of Fame in 1998. Lyons spent the last 28 years of his life as postmaster in the district surrounding Waimea, Hawaii County, Hawaii.

== Early life ==
He was born in Colrain, Franklin County, Massachusetts, April 18, 1807. He graduated from Union College in 1827. Ordained as a Congregationalist minister at Auburn Theological Seminary, September 20, 1831.

== Missionary in Hawaii ==
He embarked from Boston, Massachusetts on November 26, 1831, on the Averick with his wife Betsy Curtis (1813–1837). Part of the fifth company from the American Board of Commissioners for Foreign Missions, they arrived in the South Kohala district of the island of Hawaiʻi on May 17, 1832.

He spent the remainder of his life dedicated to the native Hawaiians

He served as pastor of Imiola Church in Waimea and the surrounding areas for 53 years. His Waimea parish eventually included the districts of Kohala and Hāmākua, making it the largest mission station in Hawaiʻi.

During his tenure, Lyons was responsible for the erection of fourteen churches, such as Imiola Church where he is buried. He was district postmaster from 1858 until his death.

== Songwriter ==
He was fluent in the Hawaiian language and composed many poems and hymns; his best known and beloved work is the hymn "Hawaiʻi Aloha" sung to the tune of "I Left it All With Jesus."

== Family ==
Rev. Lyons died on October 6, 1886, and is buried at Imiola Church Cemetery in Waimea, Hawaii County, Hawaii.

His first wife died in 1837, and he married Lucia G. Smith of Truxton, New York on July 14, 1838.

Son Curtis Jere Lyons was born June 27, 1833, attended Punahou School and graduated from Williams College in 1858. After attending Union Theological Seminary for two years, he returned to Hawaii and became a reporter. In 1868 and 1870 he was elected to the legislature of the Hawaiian Kingdom, and married Julia E. Vernon on April 23, 1873. He died on September 24, 1914.

Son Albert Brown Lyons (1841-1926) was the founding secretary of the scientific section of the American Pharmaceutical Association.

== Legacy ==
Samoan writer John Kneubuhl wrote a play based on his life titled "The Harp in the Willows" in 1946. It was one of the first published works to use Hawaiian Creole English (known outside of academic circles as "pidgin" or "pidgin English").

== See also ==
- Millerism
- List of Missionaries to Hawaii
