= Fairmont Orchid =

Luxury hotel on the Kohala Coast of the island of Hawaii, US

The Fairmont Orchid
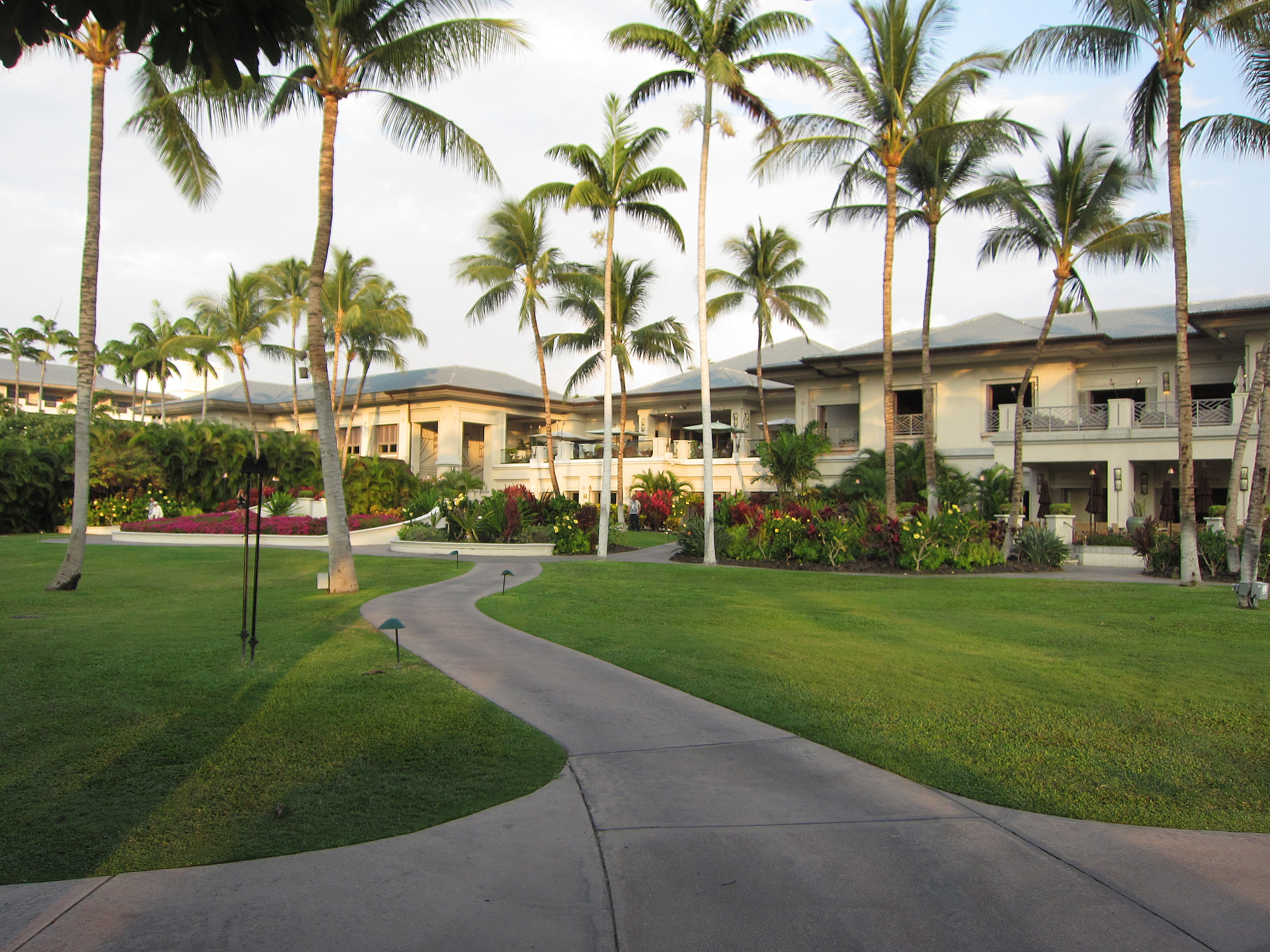
- The Fairmont Orchid
- Interactive map of the The Fairmont Orchid area

General information
- Location: Kohala Coast, Big Island, Hawaii
- Coordinates: 19.9507°N 155.8597°W
- Owner: Mirae Asset
- Management: Fairmont Hotels and Resorts

Website
- Fairmont Orchid

The Fairmont Orchid is a luxury hotel on the Kohala Coast of the island of Hawaii. It is managed by Fairmont Hotels and Resorts.

== History ==
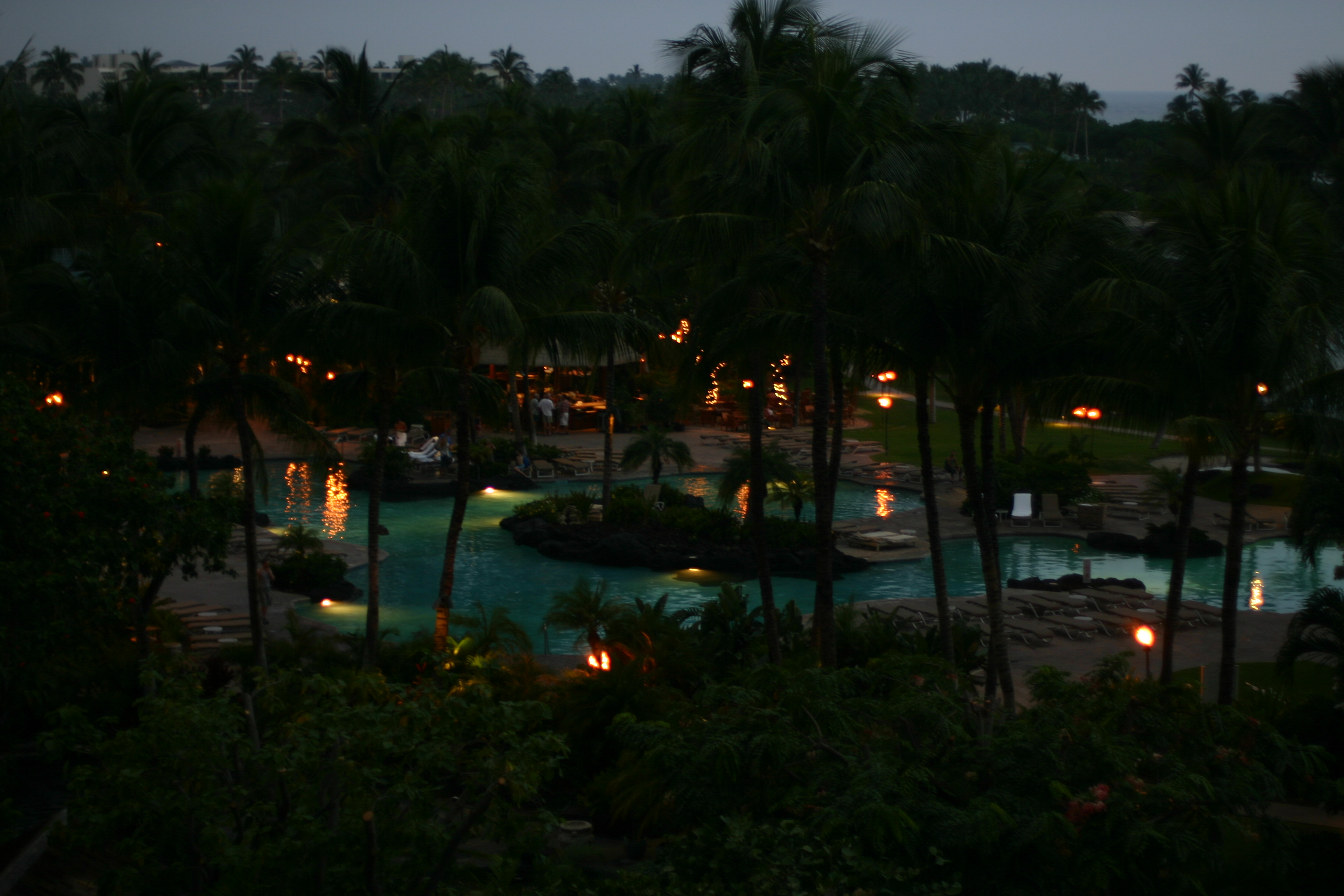
Pool at dusk, 2006

The history of Keawaiki Bay is preserved in archeological sites, lava formations, and footpaths leading everywhere from burial sites to cave complexes. The first to develop this region was Francis Hyde ʻĪʻī Brown (1892–1976), who is often referred to as the last chief; Brown was a descendant of a member of Kamehameha’s army and a superb statesman and athlete during the 1920s. In 1972, Brown sold the resort to Mauna Lani Resort, owned by Japan's Tokyu Group, and Kalahuipua'a was renamed Mauna Lani, which means “mountains reaching the heavens,” named in reverence to the five volcanic mountains that surround the Kohala region. In 1990, the resort was finished hosting 540 luxury guest rooms, a spa and 10,000-square-foot (930 m^{2}) pool. In 2015, the Fairmont Orchid was sold to South Korea-based Mirae Asset, one of Asia’s largest independent financial services firms.

== Renovations ==
In 1996, $13 million was spent on renovations to the hotel. This resulted in the addition of Brown's Beach House and a private outdoor function area. In 2002, the resort became a part of the Fairmont Hotels and Resorts chain alongside destinations as the Fairmont San Francisco and the Fairmont Banff Springs Hotel in Alberta, Canada. By the end of 2006, all guest rooms and public areas were refurnished.
