= Keawaiki Bay =

- Francis H. Ii Brown House
- U.S. National Register of Historic Places
- Location within Hawaii
- Nearest city: Waimea, Hawaii County, Hawaii
- Coordinates: 19°53′16″N 155°54′22″W
- Area: 15 acres (6.1 ha)
- NRHP reference No.: 86001616
- Added to NRHP: August 21, 1986

Keawaiki Bay is on the western coast of Hawaiʻi Island. It is the site of a residential complex built for Francis Hyde ʻĪʻī Brown (1892–1976) who was a champion golf player and legislator.

== History ==
The bay is located at 19°53′16″N 155°54′22″W. The area to the north was covered by an 1859 lava flow from Mauna Loa. It was the site of an ancient temple (heiau) and settlement of ancient Hawaii destroyed by the 1859 eruption.

Brown was a grandson of native Hawaiian historian and judge John Papa ʻĪʻī. His mother was Irene Kahalelaukoa ʻĪʻī (1869–1922) and his father was Charles Augustus Brown (born 1856). He was born in Honolulu September 16, 1892 and attended Punahou School and Fessenden School in West Newton, Massachusetts. The lands that John ʻĪʻī had been awarded were put into a trust called the John ʻĪʻī Estate, Limited. After his parents divorced in 1898 his mother remarried, which was the subject of a lawsuit due to ambiguity in the original will.

During World War I Brown served as an ambulance driver in France. He married Stephanie Wichman in Honolulu on January 30, 1919. He became an involved in several sports, including baseball, swimming, tennis, polo, and golf. He won the Hawaiian Amateur golf championship nine times. In 1924 he set a course record at the Old Course at St Andrews and in 1927 he set the course record at Pebble Beach Golf Links.

As a member of the Republican Party of Hawaii, he was elected to the Territory of Hawaii house of representatives in 1925, and the senate from 1927 through 1947, except when an automobile accident in 1935 prevented him from participating in 1936.

He purchased 15 acres (6.1 ha) on Keawaiki Bay from the territory between 1926 and 1931 as the houses were constructed. Buildings include a main house with two bedrooms, two guest houses, a caretaker house, and other structures. They were built from local lava rock. Swimmer Duke Kahanamoku spent his honeymoon in a guest house and helped design swimming pools on the property. Helen Desha Beamer composed a song about Keawaiki.

In 1932 Brown also bought a small cottage built for James Frank Woods and Eva Parker at Kalahuipuaʻa about 8 miles (13 km) to the north. The cottage is preserved as a museum in the Mauna Lani resort. The resort named its golf course for Brown. The Ala Kahakai National Historic Trail runs past the property. The complex was abandoned during World War II in 1941, and Keawaiki was sold to nephew Zadoc White Brown (1917–2006). Zadoc Brown founded the first mutual fund in Hawaii. Several animal pens near the beach were destroyed in the April 1, 1946 tsunami. Until 1974 the only access to the bay was by boat or on foot. A private unpaved road now leads from the Hawaii Belt Road that runs inland of the bay.

Brown died in 1976 in Pebble Beach, California. He was called "Mr. Golf of Hawaiʻi" when inducted into the Hawaii Sports Hall of fame.
