= Waikoloa Village, Hawaii =

Census-designated place in Hawaii, U.S.

Waikoloa Village Waikōloa Village
- Census-designated place
- Waikoloa Village sign

- Flag

- Location in Hawaii County and the state of Hawaii
- Coordinates: 19°56′29″N 155°47′34″W
- Country: United States
- State: Hawaii
- County: Hawaii

Area
  - Total: 15.76 sq mi (40.82 km^{2})
  - Land: 15.76 sq mi (40.82 km^{2})
  - Water: 0 sq mi (0.00 km^{2})
- Elevation: 410 ft (125 m)

Population (2020)
  - Total: 7,104
  - Density: 450.7/sq mi (174.02/km^{2})
- Time zone: UTC-10 (Hawaii-Aleutian)
- ZIP Code: 96738
- Area code: 808
- FIPS code: 15-76600
- GNIS feature ID: 1867263

Waikoloa Village or Waikōloa Village is a census-designated place (CDP) in Hawaiʻi County, Hawaii, United States. As of the 2020 census, Waikoloa Village had a population of 7,104. The spelling Waikoloa is used by the local post office.

== Geography ==
Waikōloa Village is on the west side of the island of Hawaiʻi at 19°56′29″N 155°47′34″W (19.941445, −155.792655). It is bordered to the west by Puako. Hawaii Route 19 forms the border between the two communities; it leads northeast 14 miles (23 km) to Waimea and southwest 28 miles (45 km) to Kailua-Kona.

Climate data for Waikoloa Village
| Month | Jan | Feb | Mar | Apr | May | Jun | Jul | Aug | Sep | Oct | Nov | Dec | Year |
|---|---|---|---|---|---|---|---|---|---|---|---|---|---|
| Average precipitation inches | 1.8 | 1.3 | 1.2 | 0.8 | 0.8 | 0.5 | 0.3 | 0.4 | 0.7 | 0.9 | 0.8 | 1.6 | 11.1 |
| Average precipitation mm | 46 | 33 | 30 | 20 | 20 | 13 | 7.6 | 10 | 18 | 23 | 20 | 41 | 281.6 |

According to the United States Census Bureau, the Waikōloa Village CDP has an area of 17.8 square miles (46.2 km^{2}), all of it land.

== Demographics ==
Historical population
| Census | Pop. | Note | %± |
|---|---|---|---|
| 2020 | 7,104 | | — |
U.S. Decennial Census

=== 2020 census ===
As of the 2020 census, Waikoloa Village had a population of 7,104. The median age was 42.4 years. 23.5% of residents were under the age of 18 and 18.4% of residents were 65 years of age or older. For every 100 females there were 101.1 males, and for every 100 females age 18 and over there were 98.8 males age 18 and over.

96.1% of residents lived in urban areas, while 3.9% lived in rural areas.

There were 2,604 households in Waikoloa Village, of which 31.5% had children under the age of 18 living in them. Of all households, 55.9% were married-couple households, 15.0% were households with a male householder and no spouse or partner present, and 19.8% were households with a female householder and no spouse or partner present. About 20.2% of all households were made up of individuals and 9.7% had someone living alone who was 65 years of age or older.

There were 3,323 housing units, of which 21.6% were vacant. The homeowner vacancy rate was 1.6% and the rental vacancy rate was 21.8%.

Racial composition as of the 2020 census
| Race | Number | Percent |
|---|---|---|
| White | 3,088 | 43.5% |
| Black or African American | 36 | 0.5% |
| American Indian and Alaska Native | 40 | 0.6% |
| Asian | 1,145 | 16.1% |
| Native Hawaiian and Other Pacific Islander | 866 | 12.2% |
| Some other race | 169 | 2.4% |
| Two or more races | 1,760 | 24.8% |
| Hispanic or Latino (of any race) | 728 | 10.2% |

=== 2000 census ===
As of the census of 2000, there were 4,806 people, 1,750 households, and 1,225 families residing in the CDP. The population density was 251.1 inhabitants per square mile (97.0/km^{2}). There were 2,057 housing units at an average density of 107.5 per square mile (41.5/km^{2}). The racial makeup of the CDP was 45.92% White, 0.48% African American, 0.21% Native American, 16.65% Asian, 9.20% Pacific Islander, 1.46% from other races, and 26.09% from two or more races. Hispanic or Latino residents of any race were 8.99% of the population.

There were 1,750 households, out of which 41.2% had children under the age of 18 living with them, 51.5% were married couples living together, 13.0% had a female householder with no husband present, and 30.0% were non-families. 19.7% of all households were made up of individuals, and 3.6% had someone living alone who was 65 years of age or older. The average household size was 2.74 and the average family size was 3.15.

In the CDP, 29.9% of the population was under the age of 18, 6.2% was from 18 to 24, 34.2% from 25 to 44, 23.0% from 45 to 64, and 6.7% was 65 years of age or older. The median age was 35 years. For every 100 females, there were 104.3 males. For every 100 females age 18 and over, there were 101.0 males.

The median income for a household in the CDP was $50,040, and the median income for a family was $55,222. Males had a median income of $36,134 versus $30,881 for females. The per capita income for the CDP was $21,328. About 8.6% of families and 10.4% of the population were below the poverty line, including 14.2% of those under age 18 and 1.8% of those age 65 or over.

== Notable people ==
- Koa Santos (born 1999) – soccer player

== See also ==
- Waikoloa Beach
- The Fairmont Orchid
