= Hawaii Aloha =

Almost the official state song of Hawaiʻi

"Hawaiʻi Aloha," also called "Kuʻu One Hanau," is a revered anthem of the native Hawaiian people and Hawaiʻi residents alike. Written by the Reverend Lorenzo Lyons, (1807–1886), also known as Makua Laiana, a Christian minister who died in 1886, to an old hymn, "I Left It All With Jesus," composed by James McGranahan (1840–1907), "Hawai‘i Aloha" was considered by the Hawaiʻi State Legislature in 1967 and by the Hawaiʻi State Constitutional Convention in 1978 to become the official state song, but "Hawaiʻi Pono‘ī," written by King David Kalākaua and composed by Royal Hawaiian Band Master Henri Berger, was chosen instead.

"Hawaiʻi Aloha" is typically sung in both small and large, formal and informal gatherings, both in Hawaiʻi and abroad, while participants stand in a circle with joined hands. It is a feature of the inauguration of the Governor of Hawaiʻi (called Ke Kiaʻaina), and the opening sessions of the Hawai‘i State House of Representatives and Hawaiʻi State Senate. Traditionally, the last chorus is sung with hands raised above heads; the act of raising hands is especially important to advocates of the Hawaiian sovereignty movement.

E Hawaiʻi e kuʻu one hānau e Kuʻu home kulaīwi nei ʻOli nō au i nā pono lani ou E Hawaiʻi, aloha ē	O Hawaiʻi, O sands of my birth My native home I rejoice in the blessings of heaven O Hawaiʻi, aloha.
Hui: E hauʻoli e nā ʻōpio o Hawaiʻi nei ʻOli ē! ʻOli ē! Mai nā aheahe makani e pā mai nei Mau ke aloha, no Hawaiʻi	Chorus: Happy youth of Hawaiʻi; Rejoice! Rejoice! Gentle breezes blow Love always for Hawaiʻi.
E haʻi mai kou mau kini lani e Kou mau kupa aloha, e Hawaiʻi; Nā mea ʻōlino kamahaʻo no luna mai E Hawaiʻi aloha ē (hui)	May your divine throngs speak Your loving people, O Hawaiʻi; The holy light from above O Hawaiʻi, aloha. (chorus)
Nā ke Akua e mālama mai iā ʻoe Kou mau kualono aloha nei Kou mau kahawai ʻōlinolino mau Kou mau māla pua nani ē (hui)	God protects you Your beloved ridges Your ever glistening streams Your beautiful flower gardens. (chorus)

== Notable performances ==
"Hawaiʻi Aloha" was sung by the Kamehameha Boys' Concert Glee Club at the 1968 funeral services for Duke Kahanamoku. The arrangement included nose flute, chanting, and organ accompaniment.
