= List of ukulele players =

This is a list of ukulele players. These musicians and bands are well known for playing the ukulele as their primary instrument and have an associated linked Wikipedia article. It is not intended for everyone that can play the instrument.

== A ==
- Danielle Anderson (aka Danielle Ate the Sandwich)
- Zee Avi
- Hannan Azlan

== B ==
- Ed Balls
- Sara Bareilles
- Jim Beloff
- Jón Þór Birgisson, more commonly known as Jónsi
- Petty Booka
- David Bowie
- Cali Rose Brandau
- Craig Brandau
- May Singhi Breen
- Joe Brown
- Sam Brown
- Warren Buffett

== C ==
- Graeme Cairns
- Dan "Soupy" Campbell
- Billy "Uke" Carpenter
- Jason Castro
- Ryan Choi
- Jacob Collier
- Zach Condon (Beirut)
- Frank Crumit
- Albert "Sonny" Cunha
- Cavetown
- Charley Yang (Commonly known as BoyWithUke )

== D ==
- J. Chalmers Doane
- Zooey Deschanel
- Stephen DiLauro (aka Uke Jackson)

== E ==
- Andy Eastwood
- Billie Eilish
- Cliff Edwards ("Ukulele Ike")

== F ==
- Wayne Federman
- Tom Fletcher
- George Formby Jr.

== G ==
- Merrill Garbus
- Taimane Gardner
- Orla Gartland
- Imua Garza (Opihi Pickers)
- Arthur Godfrey
- Roger Greenawalt

== H ==
- Wendell Hall
- George Harrison
- Greg Hawkes
- The Hazzards
- Harry Hill
- James Hill
- Daniel Ho
- Don Ho
- Sol Hoʻopiʻi
- Honoka & Azita
- Tally Hall

== I ==
- Ingrid Michaelson
- Israel Kamakawiwoʻole

== J ==
- Aidan James
- Joji, mostly only in his earlier works
- John Paul Jones
- Tyler Joseph

== K ==
- Ernest Ka'ai
- Kaʻau Crater Boys
- Harry Kalahiki
- Eddie Kamae
- Israel Kamakawiwoʻole
- Kaplan Kaye
- Buster Keaton
- Genoa Keawe
- John King
- Stanley King
- The King Blues
- Richard W. Konter
- Tomas Kurth

== L ==
- Gabby La La
- Langley Ukulele Ensemble
- John Lennon
- Queen Lili'uokalani Kamakaʻeha
- Jeff Lynneplay.
- Molly Lewis
- Malcolm Lowry
- LP

== M ==
- William H. Macy
- Sophie Madeleine
- Johnny Marvin
- Brian May
- Dent May
- Paul McCartney
- Nellie McKay
- Kate Micucci
- Bette Midler
- Mr.B The Gentleman Rhymer
- Joni Mitchell
- Peter Moon
- Bina Mossman
- Jason Mraz
- mxmtoon

== N ==
- King Ben Nawahi
- New York Ukulele Ensemble
- Noah and the Whale
- Julia Nunes

== O ==
- Yōko Oginome
- Herb Ohta
- Tessie O'Shea
- Erlend Øye

== P ==
- Amanda Palmer
- Tom Petty
- Elvis Presley
- Age Pryor

== R ==
- Alan Randall
- Lil' Rev
- Lyle Ritz
- Gerald Ross

== S ==
- Buffy Sainte-Marie
- Roy Sakuma
- Luthea Salom
- Max Schneider
- Billy "Uke" Scott
- Peter Sellers
- Christopher Sembroski
- Jake Shimabukuro
- Amanda Shires
- Sigurlaug Gísladóttir
- Frank Sinatra
- Frank Skinner
- Roy Smeck
- Rebecca Sugar
- Jimmy Stafford (Train)
- Sarah Stiles
- Heidi Swedberg
- Taylor Swift

== T ==
- Bill Tapia
- Tiny Tim
- Rachel Trachtenburg
- Ayano Tsuji
- Tiki King
- Meghan Trainor
- Taimane Gardner

== U ==
- Ukulele Orchestra of Great Britain

== V ==
- Eddie Vedder (Pearl Jam)
- Grace VanderWaal
- Avery Varivoda
- Victoria Vox
- Vance Joy

== W ==
- Walk Off the Earth
- Wild Child
- Wellington International Ukulele Orchestra
- Ian Whitcomb
- Patrick Wolf

== See also ==
- Lists of musicians
