= Mighty Uke =

Mighty Uke: The Amazing Comeback of a Musical Underdog
- Directed by: Tony Coleman
- Written by: Margaret Meagher
- Distributed by: Tiny Goat Films, Inc.
- Release date: January 11, 2010
- Running time: 76 minutes
- Country: Canada
- Language: English

Mighty Uke: The Amazing Comeback of a Musical Underdog (released 2010) is a documentary film about the ukulele. It combines graphics, photographs, interviews and performance footage to tell the story of the ukulele and its recent resurgence in popularity.

== Production ==
- Tony Coleman - Producer, Director, Editor
- Margaret Meagher - Writer, Producer, Graphic Designer
- Ron Mann - Executive Producer

== Summary ==
Mighty Uke follows the history of the ukulele's popularity from its earliest days in the court of Hawaiian King David Kalākaua through the ‘lost’ years, then its first revival on early radio and the stages of vaudeville; then through several decades in the shadows again as jazz flourished until the days of early television and revival again with stars such as Arthur Godfrey. It again fell out of popularity as rock dominated popular music, but in the 21st Century is experiencing its third revival. In addition to the musical capacities of the small instrument, the film investigates the social aspects of the ukulele.

Mighty Uke opens with Jake Shimabukuro talking about his journey with the ukulele and then describes the current revival, in which young musicians, middle aged amateurs and school kids alike are all turning to the uke. It tracks the revival around the world, through Europe, the Middle East, Japan, Canada and the US, where ukulele groups 2000-strong meet in parks, thousands gather for ukefests and children play their first music on the ukulele.

One segment features the Langley Ukulele Ensemble, a school program that began in the 1970s.

Among the stories is one about the "Ukuleles for Peace", an initiative to teach the ukulele to Arab and Israeli children together. As film critic Leonard Maltin says, "When you see Arab and Israeli children singing and playing a tune called "Ukuleles for Peace" I dare you not to smile."

== Notable appearances ==
The documentary covers many important people in the ukulele world.

- Jim and Liz Beloff
- James Hill and Anne Davison
- John King
- The Langley Ukulele Ensemble
- Lil' Rev
- Andy Andrews and the Ukulele Club of Santa Cruz
- Gerald Ross (uncredited - playing steel guitar)
- Jake Shimabukuro
- Bill Tapia

== Extras ==
The DVD release includes a large number of shorts gathered during filming. Brief interviews and demonstrations give additional insight into the history and the social aspects of the ukulele as well as its musical abilities.

- The Uke saved Martin Guitars
- The Ukulele of the Future - A display of vintage ukes with some modern creations
- Ukes for Peace in the Middle East - Paul Moore
- Bosko and Honey's Ukulele Safari
- The Strum Bums of Grass Valley - Dan Scanlan
- On the Road with Victoria Vox
- Connecting with the Big People - Taimane Gardner
- The Boy Who Loved George Formby - Steven Sproat
- Reviving the Music of Old Hawaii - John King
- Your First Uke Lesson - Presented by James Hill this lesson starts with an introduction to the nomenclature, some basic chords and your first song in less than 7 minutes.

== The Mighty Uke Roadshow ==
Sponsored in part by Kala Brand Music Co., the film continues to travel around the world for showings. Showings are often prefaced with the local ukulele groups and performers and followed up with open strums for those that bring their instruments with them. One feature is often a drawing for a Mighty Uke ukulele.

== Awards ==
- 2009 Woodstock Film Festival - Best Documentary Feature - Second place
- 2009 Whistler Film Festival - People's Choice Award - Runner-up
- 2010 Possible Worlds Film Festival - Audience Award for Best Film

== Mighty Uke Day ==
In May 2011, ukulele fans in the Lansing, Michigan area wanted to get together and view the film. Ben Hassenger, a local musician and one of the founders of the Lansing Area Ukulele Group (L.A.U.G.H.) made arrangements with Tony Coleman to come and show the film. At the same time he set up an impromptu ukulele festival in conjunction with the showing and Music is the Foundation, a non-profit to raise money to help out a number of local music programs. A meeting of L.A.U.G.H. started the day followed by open mike performances including some featured performers and several showings of the film. The initial meeting launched an annual event, as well as being credited with the establishment of several new ukulele groups, including the Motor City Ukes.

Mighty Uke Day II was held May 5, 2012 and added an appearance on Lansing Community College's Grand River Radio Diner on WLNZ 89.7 FM, a main stage concert with Gerald Ross, The Fabulous Heftones and Lil' Rev and a number of workshops. Nearby Elderly Instruments, one of the event sponsors, had a large display of vintage and unique ukuleles of all types in their shop.

Mighty Uke Day III in 2013 built on the success of the prior years. In addition to the open mike and previous activities, it featured a main stage with several dozen performers, numerous ukulele workshops and concerts on both Friday and Saturday night. Friday night included opening acts of Susan Picking and The Springtails with main act Danielle Ate the Sandwich. The Saturday concert had opening acts of Ryan Rodriquez, Mitch Chang, and Strangers in the Night, followed by main act James Hill with Anne Janelle.

Mighty Uke Day IV was held May 9 & 10, 2014 in Old Town Lansing. The headline act Saturday night was Sarah Maisel and Craig Chee. Friday night featured an all Michigan line up including Magdalena Fossum, The Fabulous Heftones, Gerald Ross, Strangers in the Night and The Springtails.

Mighty Uke Day V, commonly referred to as 'MUD' continues to expand both in time and area. MUD5 was held May 8, 9 and 10, 2015 and included workshops in three different venues, group strums, concerts on Friday and Saturday nights and Sunday afternoon. Festivities began on Friday with a strum on the Michigan State Capital steps. Friday's concert was headlined by Stuart Fuchs and the opening acts included Gerald Ross, Susan Picking and Andy Wilson. Saturday's concert featured Victoria Vox with opening acts of high school musician Kendall Cassella, Ukulele Dwight (Joel Mabus) and the duo Saldaje. Also featured was a 13-foot ukulele built by Larry Stump and actually played by Stuart Fuchs during his concert.

In 2015 Mighty Uke Day spun off a Mini Mighty Uke Day with a Fall gathering that featured Victor & Penny providing workshops and a concert.

Mighty Uke Day VI took place on May 13–15, 2016. MUD6 it featured concerts, workshops, group strums, open mics, featured performers, children's activities, informal opportunities to jam, and much more. Evening performers include; Kalei Gamiao, Victor and Penny, Marlowe, Megan Dooley, Ryan Rodriguez, and The Ukulele Kings. Sponsorship from Lansing Community College provided for an auditorium for the concerts Friday and Saturday night.

Mini Mighty Uke Day in 2016 featured Andy Andrews hosting three workshops and a concert that evening.

Mighty Uke Day VII - Friday concert was Women of the Great Uke State, featuring Olivia Millerschin, Marlow and Julianna Wilson. Daniel Ward and Heidi Swedberg presented workshops and were the headliners at the Saturday night concert with opening act The Ukulele Kings.
