= Brookfield, Nova Scotia =

Community in Nova Scotia, Canada

Brookfield
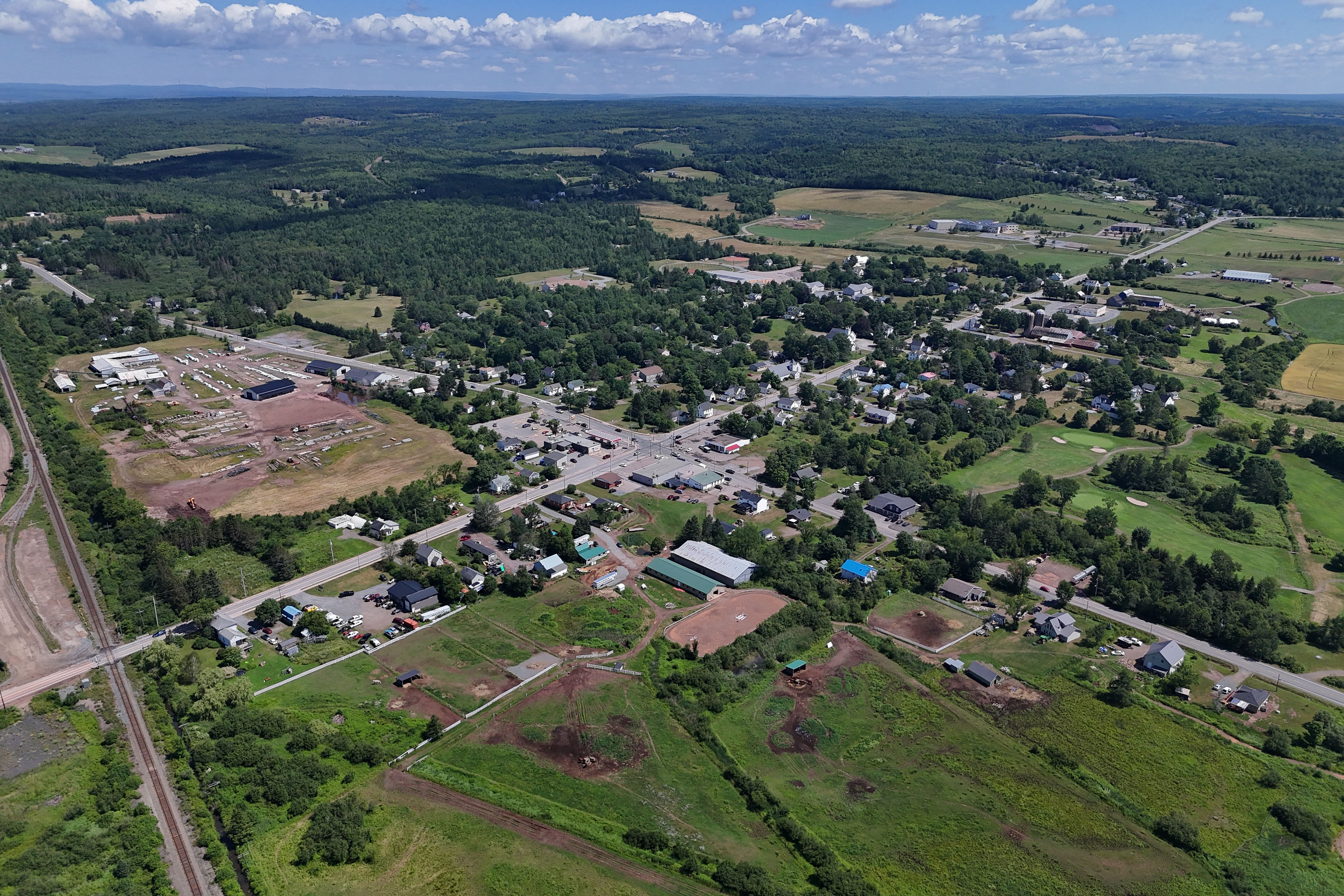
- Aerial view (2025)

- Location of Brookfield, Nova Scotia
- Coordinates: 45°15′15″N 63°14′35″W
- Country: Canada
- Province: Nova Scotia
- Municipality: Colchester County
- Established: 1784

Area
  - Total: 1.27 km^{2} (0.49 sq mi)

Population (2021 Census)
  - Total: 439
  - Density: 344.6/km^{2} (893/sq mi)
- Time zone: UTC-4 (AST)
  - Summer (DST): UTC-3 (ADT)
- Canadian Postal code: B0N 1C0
- Area code: 902
- Telephone Exchange: 673
- NTS Map: 011E06

Brookfield (2021 population: 439) is an unincorporated community in the Canadian province of Nova Scotia, located in southern Colchester County.

Surrounded by farming areas and forestry, Brookfield is located along Highway 102 and Trunk 2 where they intersect with Route 289.

== History ==
Brookfield was founded in 1784 by William Hamilton and Daniel Moore. 2009 marked 225 years of settlement in Brookfield and the community received the Lieutenant Governor's Community Spirit Award at a July 18 ceremony marking the opening of Coming Home to Brookfield Days, 2009.

== Demographics ==
In the 2021 Census of Population conducted by Statistics Canada, Brookfield had a population of 439 living in 202 of its 209 total private dwellings, a change of −1.3% from its 2016 population of 445. With a land area of 1.27 km^{2} (0.49 sq mi), it had a population density of 345.7/km^{2} (895.3/sq mi) in 2021.

== Station ==
Brookfield station is a former Canadian National Railway station, built in 1938 or 1933.

In 1998, the building was moved from its former location adjacent to the railway line to another location in Brookfield, Ed Creelman Memorial Park. The station building and the park in which it is located are now operated by a community group, Brookfield Railway Station and Heritage Society. The station building houses historical artifacts and the grounds are used for community events.

== Sports teams ==
=== Brookfield Elks Junior B Hockey Team ===
The team currently plays in the Nova Scotia Junior Hockey League (NSJHL). The league consists of 12 teams from all over Nova Scotia. The franchise began in 1995 and the team was known as the Colchester Titans. The team was then moved to the Don Henderson Memorial Sportplex and the name was changed to the Colchester Eagles in the 1996 season. The team finally became the Brookfield Elks franchise we know today in 1997. - Junior B Elks Hockey

=== 1980 Brookfield Elks Senior 'A' Softball Team ===
The Brookfield Elks Senior 'A' Softball team realized a long sought-after dream in 1980 when they became the first team east of Ontario to capture the national crown. The year marked their fourth straight Nova Scotia Championship and their fourth straight trip to Nationals.

== Notable residents ==
- Anne Janelle, classical musician
- James Hill (Canadian musician)
- John McPherson, poet
- Jane Soley Hamilton, pioneer midwife, 1805-1897
- Scott Armstrong, politician
- Robert H. Kennedy, businessman and politician
