= Mya-Moe Ukuleles =

American ukulele manufacturing company

Mya-Moe
- Company type: LLC
- Industry: Musical instruments
- Founded: 2008; 17 years ago in White Salmon, Washington
- Founder: Gordon and Char Mayer
- Headquarters: Glenview, Illinois, United States
- Key people: Cary Kelly (owner)
- Products: Ukuleles
- Website: myamoeukuleles.com

Mya-Moe Ukuleles, LLC is an American ukulele manufacturing company established in 2008. The company's original headquarters and primary workshop were in White Salmon, Washington. The current headquarters and workshop are in Glenview, Illinois, just north of Chicago.

== History ==
Mya-Moe Ukuleles was founded in 2008 by Gordon and Char Mayer, husband and wife luthiers. In 2018, company ownership and operations transitioned to Cary Kelly who continued to build Mya-Moe Ukuleles using the original designs and processes. Ukuleles are primarily sold direct to consumer via the company web store rather than through a retail shop or dealers. Mya-Moe Ukuleles has a reputation for making quality instruments with configurable components.

== Instruments ==
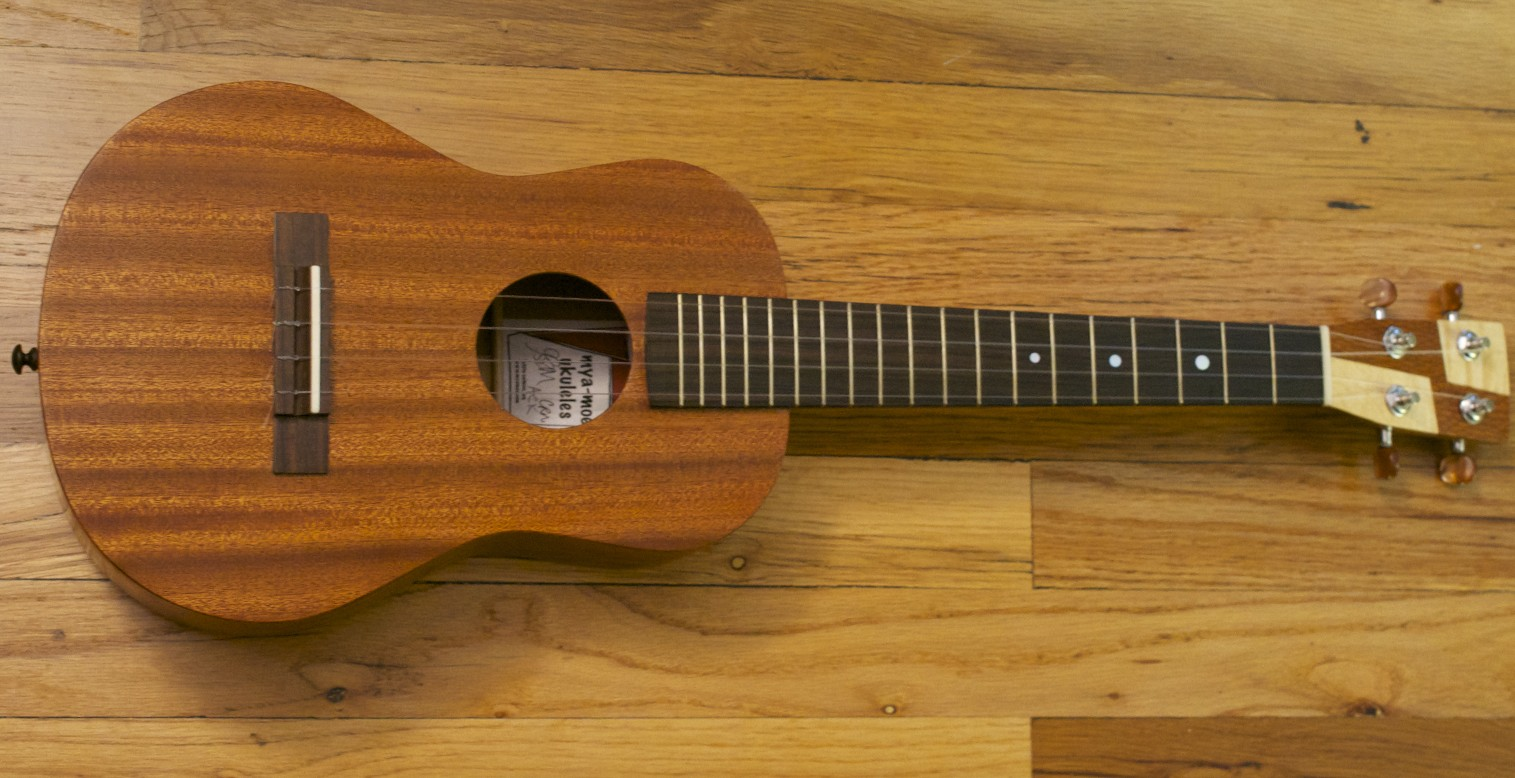
Traditional model: tenor ukulele in mahogany

Mya-Moe ukuleles have been built from over 20 woods including traditional koa as well as myrtlewood (Umbellularia) found only in the local southern Oregon and northern Californian coasts.

Mya-Moe Ukuleles are available in five different sizes;: soprano, super soprano, concert, tenor and baritone.

Once the building process begins on an instrument, daily progress can be viewed on the UkeTracker page of the Mya-Moe website as photos are taken for each step.

== Endorsements ==
Mya-Moe has created more than 2500 ukuleles for amateur and professional musicians around the world, including Eddie Vedder, Dave Matthews, Mumford & Sons, Trey Anastasio (Phish), Ben Harper, Florence + the Machine, James Hill, Victoria Vox, and The Decemberists.
