= The Hazzards =

American ukulele-based band

The Hazzards, formerly known as The Ukes of Hazzard, is an American ukulele-based band, best known for their cult hit single "Gay Boyfriend".

Founded by Sydney Maresca and Anne Harris after they met at a party in 2000, The Hazzards started out as a ukulele/Casio SK-1/glockenspiel/tambourine duo.

In 2005, three further musicians joined the band, and consists of:

- Sydney Maresca
- Anne Harris
- Will Carlough (drums)
- Andrew Dickerson (bass)
- Paul Thureen (harp)

The band's biggest hit, "Gay Boyfriend", had an unconventional novelty music video, created for a small internet site, which gained international airplay on MTV and most other music networks, especially in the United Kingdom. It became an internet cult hit with over two million downloads. In November 2003, the Europop remix debuted at #67 on the UK Singles Chart, but left after a week.

The Hazzards also appeared on multiple episodes of the U.S. television program Rad Girls on Fuse.

== See also ==
- List of ukulele musicians
