= Bill Tapia =

Bill "Tappy" Tapia
- Uncle Bill "Tappy" Tapia in 2007

Background information
- Born: Louis William Tapia; January 1, 1908; Sapporo, Hokkaido, Empire of Japan
- Origin: Honolulu, Hawaii, U.S.
- Died: December 2, 2011 (aged 103) Westminster, California, U.S.
- Genres: Jazz; Hawaiians
- Occupations: Singer; musician
- Years active: 1918–2011
- Website: BillTapia.com

Louis William Tapia (January 1, 1908 – December 2, 2011), known as "Uncle Bill" and "Tappy", was an American musician, born to Portuguese parents. At age 8, Tapia was already a professional musician, playing "Stars and Stripes Forever" for World War I troops in Hawaii.

In his long career beginning in vaudeville and quickly expanding as a jazz guitarist and ukulele player he performed with names such as Bing Crosby, Louis Armstrong, Elvis Presley and Hawaiian musicians such as King Bennie Nawahi, Sol Hoʻopiʻi, and Andy Iona.

The Chiang & Coates documentary "To You, Sweetheart, Aloha" was created to celebrate 94 year old Tapia's life.

Tapia was an associate of Sonny Cunha and played with the Johnny Noble Band at the opening of the Royal Hawaiian Hotel in 1927. He taught Shirley Temple and Clark Gable to strum the ukulele. He was also the ukulele player on Bing Crosby's hit "Blue Hawaii." Despite his long life, Tapia did not record any music until 2004 when he put out his first CD at the age of 96. On March 23, 2004, he provided a detailed interview for the NAMM Oral History Program collection about his impressive career and life in music. He recalled designing several instruments for many of his luthier friends as well as improvement and adjustments to the uke he had over the years.

Tapia performed on Visiting with Huell Howser Season 13 Episode 3, "Ukulele Man," which aired January 15, 2006, when Tapia was 97.

He continued to perform and record at an advanced age, all the while remaining in vigorous health and driving a car until his 100th birthday when he began suffering eyesight problems.

Tapia was a featured performer in Mighty Uke: The Amazing Comeback of a Musical Underdog, a 2010 documentary on the ukulele. In 2011, he was awarded The Academy of Recording Arts Lifetime Achievement Award.

Tapia died in his sleep on December 2, 2011, a month short of turning 104.

== Discography ==
- Tropical Swing, 2004
- Duke of Uke, 2005
- Livin' It Live, 2009
- Young at Heart: Japan Live, 2009
- Live Warner Grand Theatre: 100th Birthday Concert, 2009
