= Victoria Vox =

American singer-songwriter

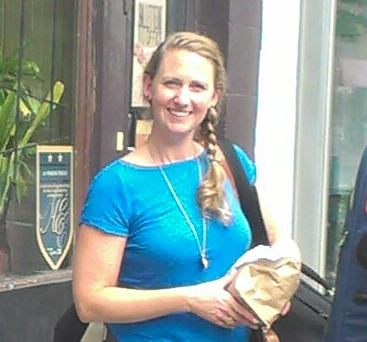
- Victoria Vox in 2015

Background information
- Birth name: Victoria Davitt
- Born: October 17, 1978 (age 46); Sturgeon Bay, Wisconsin, US
- Genres: Pop, jazz, singer-songwriter, chanson
- Occupation(s): Singer, songwriter
- Instrument(s): Vocals, ukulele, guitar, mouth trumpet, trumpet
- Years active: 1999–present
- Labels: OBUS Music (independent)
- Website: victoriavox.com

Victoria Davitt (born October 17, 1978), better known by stage name Victoria Vox, is a singer, songwriter and musician specialising in the ukulele. A native of Green Bay, Wisconsin, Vox now resides in Costa Mesa, California when not on tour.

The Baltimore Sun notes her influences as including the Cranberries, Madonna, Cyndi Lauper, Patty Griffin, Sting, and Peter Gabriel. Other influences include Laurie Anderson and Chet Baker.

== History ==
At age 16, Vox spent a year living in France, living with a French family and becoming fluent in the French language. She began playing the guitar at age 17, a year before entering the Berklee College of Music in Boston, Massachusetts., where she lived in the same dorm as singer-songwriter John Mayer who said he wrote the song Victoria from his 1999 EP Inside Wants Out about her. While at Berklee, she recorded her first record collaboration, performing with a band in Victoria and the Ultra Pink Bicycle Incident. In 2000, she graduated with honors from the Berklee College of Music with a degree in songwriting. After her graduation, she moved briefly to Nashville, Tennessee. Shortly after, she moved to England where she released an acoustic record of emotional material entitled Still.

After moving back to Green Bay in 2003, she committed herself to a career as a professional musician and in 2004 formed a group called Tres Femmes with singer/songwriters Kellie Lin Knott of Minneapolis and Stolie of Chicago. They released a self-titled acoustic cd and toured nationally. Vox began to add bass and ukulele to the group's music and in 2004 she recorded In Between, an acoustic EP that began to experiment with more pop sounds than her previous work. Following this release, the ukulele became her primary instrument and fans requested an album focusing on the uke. In 2006, after moving from Green Bay to Baltimore, Maryland, she released her first album of ukulele music through Obus Records. The album was entitled Victoria Vox and Her Jumping Flea because "jumping flea" is the literal translation of the Hawaiian word "ukulele". Though her professional, performance repertoire contains little traditional Hawaiian ukulele music, with the 2008 release of Chameleon, Vox gained renown for her use of the ukulele with pop music. Vox is featured in a short segment in the extras on the DVD release of Mighty Uke: The Amazing Comeback of a Musical Underdog, a 2010 documentary on the ukulele.

Victoria Vox has toured the US, and plays over 125 performance dates annually, including ukulele festivals across the United States, Canada, Australia, New Zealand, Italy, France, and England. She has been featured on NPR, and her song "America" from Jumping Flea was featured on the A&E show Random 1.

Vox was the runner-up in the International Acoustic Music Awards for 'My Darlin' Beau' (Jumping Flea), and later won First place for 'C'est Noyé' ("Chameleon") in the same competition. She has been profiled in Relix magazine's "On the Verge: 5 Artists You Should Know" section.

In December 2009, Victoria Vox performed mouth trumpet in the "Meal or No Meal" segment on The Jay Leno Show. After being discovered by producers on YouTube.com, she auditioned over the phone, performing Lady Gaga's "Poker Face". For The Jay Leno Show, Vox performed a cover of Europe's "The Final Countdown" despite her own preference for her original music. Vox was awarded a gift certificate for eight to the Japanese restaurant Benihana for her performance in the segment, which included a solo performance of the "mouth trumpet" which she produces by singing through slightly parted lips, on the right side of her mouth.

Sony BMG and Austrian artist Valerie Sajdik recorded "Noyé" ("C'est Noyé" penned by Victoria Vox) on her 2010 release, Ich Bin Du Bist.

Other recent awards (2010–12) include six Washington Area Music Awards (Wammies) (for Folk – Contemporary Vocalist, Contemporary Album of the Year, and Fan Favorite) and the people's vote for the "Vox Pop" award for Adult Contemporary Album of the Year (Exact Change) in 10th Annual Independent Music Awards. She is also a member of 1% for the Planet.

Vox married musician Jack Maher in 2016 and the two occasionally perform together as Jack & the Vox. Their honeymoon was spent on a tour of Belgium, Denmark, France, Great Britain and Ireland where they participated in the Grand Northern Ukulele Festival. They have since performed across the US, in Canada, and the Czech Republic. During the pandemic the two created "The Best Medicine Show", performing one original and one cover, daily, on the internet.

Vox has appeared on the cover of Ukulele Magazine (US, 2015 and 2022) and Uke Magazine (UK, 2018).

== Instruments ==
KoAloha Ukulele in Honolulu, Hawaii was the first to endorse Vox in December 2005. Over the years she has also accepted sponsorships by Mya-Moe Ukuleles, Kala Brand Music Ukulele Company, Petros.,, Romero Creations, and SoundSmith.

== Discography ==
- 1999: Victoria and the Ultra Pink Bicycle Incident (electric full band album)
- 2003: Still (solo acoustic album)
- 2004: Tres Femmes (side project album with Stolie and Kellie Lin Knott)
- 2004: In Between (EP) (produced by Jon Tyler Starr)
- 2006: Victoria Vox and Her Jumping Flea (produced by Mike Tarantino and Paul Kim) - debut ukulele album
- 2008: Chameleon (produced by Mike Tarantino)
- 2008: Holiday Card (EP) (produced by Mike Tarantino and Paul Kim)
- 2010: Exact Change (produced by Mike Tarantino) - Adult Contemporary Album, Vox Populi Winner, Independent Music Awards
- 2011: Vox Ukulele Cello (produced by Victoria Vox) - 2011 Washington Area Music Awards, Folk Contemporary Album of the Year
- 2012: Under the Covers (cover song album, produced by Steve Hamilton)
- 2013: Boombox Séance (side project band produced by Geoff Stanfield)
- 2013: Key (produced by Geoff Stanfield) - Adult Contemporary Album Nominee, Independent Music Awards
- 2015: When the Night Unravels (produced by Geoff Stanfield)
- 2018: Colorful Heart (produced by Victoria Vox and Hal Ratliff)
- 2022: Nirvana In REM (Inspired by the art of Fred Stonehouse)
- 2024: Nirvana In REM (Ukulele Re:Vision)

== Compilations ==
- 2009: Square Pegs, Round Holes Compilation
- 2010: "Colorful Heart" (song) on A Song Still Remains Compilation (charity album for the Duchenne Foundation)
- 2011: Goose Creek Songwriter Sessions. Single track.
- 2017:One World (song) on Ukulele Sirens Compilation (charity album for ocean research and preservation)
