= Harry Kalahiki =

Hawaiian musician (1928–1991)

Harry Kalahiki (1928 – March 31, 1991) was a Hawaiian musician. He was a "ukulele virtuoso". His 1960 album Mungo Plays Ukulele is regarded as the first album of instrumental ukulele music. The album was reissued in 2012.
