= Lil' Rev =

Marc Revenson
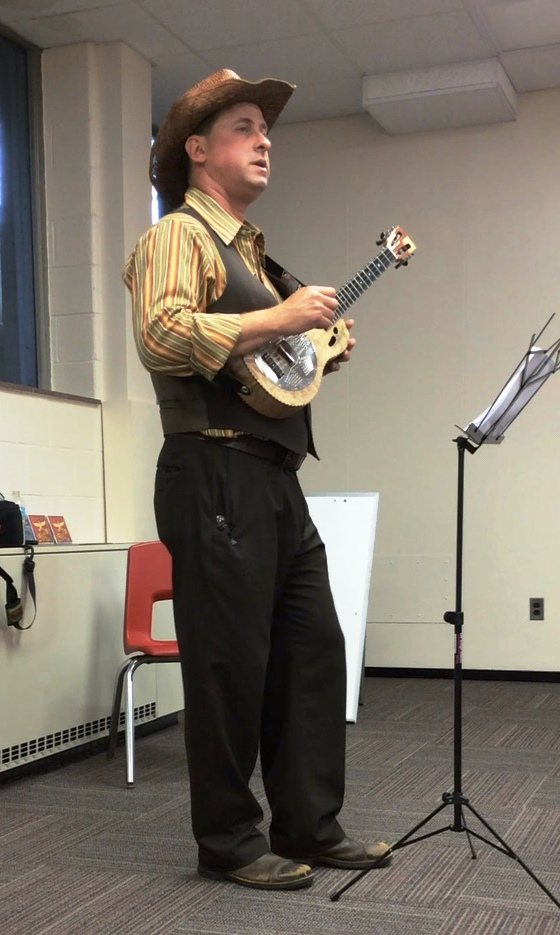
- Lil' Rev, with his Mya-Moe resonator ukulele teaching a class.

Background information
- Birth name: Marc Revenson
- Also known as: Lil' Rev
- Born: 1968 (age 56–57)
- Genres: jazz, blues, bluegrass, folk, tin pan alley
- Instrument(s): Ukulele, Harmonica, Mandolin, Guitar
- Years active: 1994–present
- Website: Lil' Rev

Lil Rev (Marc Revenson), was born 1968 in Milwaukee, Wisconsin is a musician best known for his Yiddish music, and is also a renowned ukulele and harmonica player.

In 1984, he was given an old Wendell Hall Banjo Ukulele which started his passion for the instrument.

Since then, Lil Rev has released a series of books, focusing on ukulele and harmonica instruction, as well as providing instruction locally through workshops. His performances feature a multitude of instruments and story-telling.

== Awards ==
- 2004 - "Best Folksinger Award" from the Wisconsin Area Music Industry.
- 1996 - National Blues Harmonica Champion

== Instruments ==
Lil' Rev's instrument of choice is most often a Mya-Moe resonator ukulele in various sizes. He prefers the Hohner Special 20 for his harmonica playing.

== Media ==
=== Solo ===
- Ragged But Beautiful (1994)
- Mouth Organ Minstrel (1996)
- Blues for the People (1997)
- That Old Madness (1999)
- Sojourns & Sidewalks (2001)
- Fountain of Uke (2003)
- Fountain of Uke Vol. 2 (2005)
- Drop Baby, Drop, Patchwork Records (2009)
- Happiest Way to be Sad, Fountain of Uke Music (2011)
- Claw and Hammer, Fountain of Uke Records (2016)

=== Collaborations ===
- Uke Town with Pig Ankle Dave, Lil Rev Music (1996)
- Around the Camp Fire Late At Night with Larry Penn (2010)

=== DVD ===
- Showpieces with Lil' Rev

=== Books ===
==== Music Books ====
- Easy Songs for Ukulele, Hal Leonard Corporation (September 1, 2008) ISBN 978-1-4234-0277-0
- Hal Leonard Ukulele Method Book 1, Hal Leonard Corporation (December 1, 2005) ISBN 978-0-634-07986-3 (Also available in Spanish)
- Hal Leonard Ukulele Method Book 2, Hal Leonard Corporation (September 1, 2008) ISBN 978-1-4234-1617-3
- Play Harmonica Today, Hal Leonard Corporation (December 1, 2009) ISBN 978-1-4234-3089-6
- 101 Ukulele Licks, Hal Leonard Corporation (January 1, 2011) ISBN 978-1-4234-8264-2
- Hal Leonard Baritone Ukulele Method Book 1, Hal Leonard Corporation (June 1, 2012) ISBN 978-1-4584-0487-9
- Fiddle Tunes for Ukulele, Hal Leonard Corporation (November 1, 2014) ISBN 978-1-4584-7723-1
- Essential Strums & Strokes for Ukulele: A Treasury of Strum-Hand Techniques, Hal Leonard Corporation (October 1, 2015) ISBN 978-1-4803-3986-6
- Intros, Endings & Turnarounds for Ukulele: Spice Up Your Uke Repertoire with These Timeless Chestnuts, Hal Leonard (June 1, 2018) ISBN 978-1-4950-5665-9
- Blue Arpeggios
- Lil' Rev's Strum Along Songbook
- Sing Song Daddy Songbook

==== Poetry ====
- Lil' Red Poem Book
- Lil' Gold Poem Book
- Ukulele Nation

=== Appears in ===
- Mighty Uke: The Amazing Comeback of a Musical Underdog
