= Tahitian ukulele =

Fretted lute native to Tahiti

Tahitian Ukulele
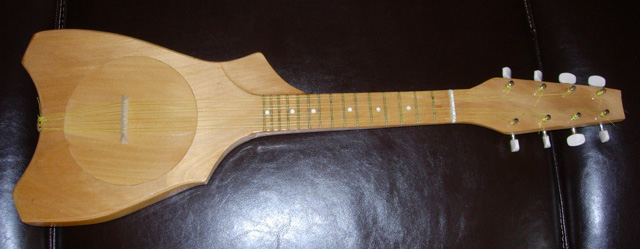
- Classification: String instrument (plucked)

Related instruments
- ukulele, lute

The Tahitian ukulele (ʻukarere or Tahitian banjo) is a short-necked fretted lute with eight nylon strings in four doubled courses, native to Tahiti and played in other regions of Polynesia. This variant of the older Hawaiian ukulele is noted by a higher and thinner sound and an open back, and is often strummed much faster.

The two middle courses are tuned an octave higher than they would be on a normal ukulele, and fishing line is used for the strings. It is also tuned similarly to the mandolin but shaped like an electric guitar. The bass Tahitian ukulele is another variant of the Tahitian Ukulele but pitched an octave lower. The Bowed Tahitian Ukulele is similar to Tahitian Ukulele but played with a bow like a violin or viola instead of strumming

== Cook islands ukulele ==
The tuning of the four courses (all in unison).

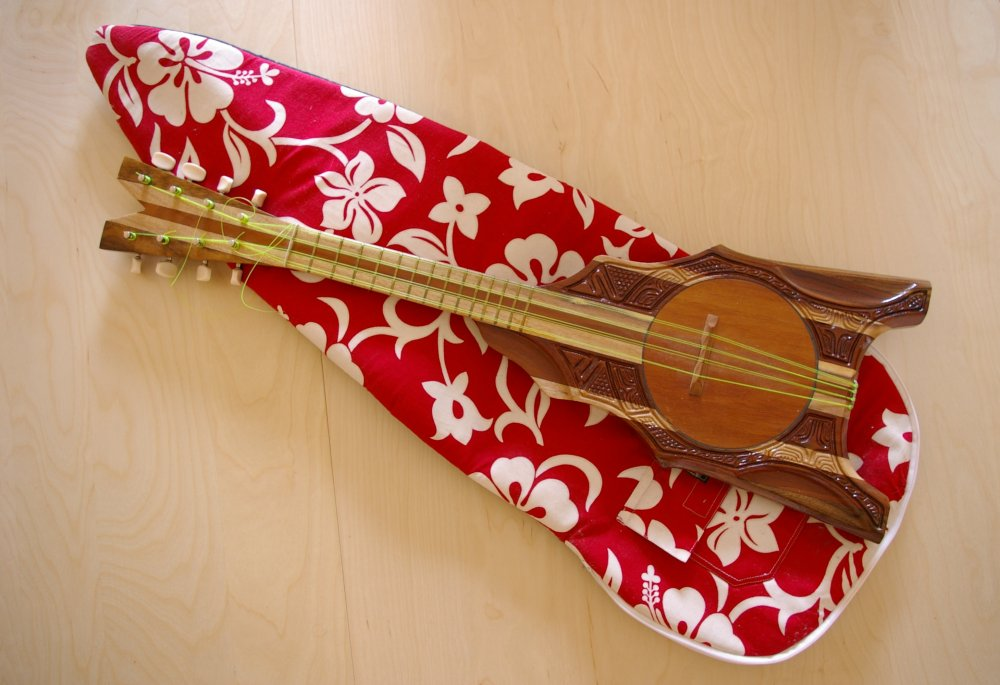
A Polynesian ukulele.

The Tahitian ukulele is significantly different from other ukuleles because it does not have a hollow soundbox. The body (including the head and neck) is usually carved from a single piece of wood, with a wide conical hole bored through the middle. Alternatively Tahitian ukulele can be carved out of three pieces of wood with the sides being made from different woods for decoration. The bowed Tahitian Ukulele is a bowed version of Tahitian ukulele with a violin bow similar to a bowed guitar.

The tapered hole bored through the body is about 4 centimetres (1.6 in) in diameter on the back; at the front it is about 10 centimetres (3.9 in) in diameter. The hole is topped with a thin piece of wood, on which the bridge sits, so the instrument works rather like a wood-topped banjo. Indeed, some of these instruments are referred to as Tahitian banjos. The strings are usually made from light-gauge fishing line, usually green in colour (usually around 20 pounds-force [89 N]).

== History ==
The instrument seems to be a relatively recent invention, popular in eastern Polynesia, particularly French Polynesia. The instrument is also used in the Marquesas Islands for pan-Pacific and Tahitian-based music, and in the Cook Islands, where it became popular after its 1995 use in a music video by Tahitian band Te Ava Piti.

More recently, it has been used as the lead instrument in the Arrested Development theme tune, played by George Doering.

== Current luthiers ==
- Kaota Puna (New Zealand)
- Asonu (Chile) Asonu: Tahitian Ukelele
- Tahiti Ukulele (California, United States) TAHITIAN UKULELE
