= Langley Ukulele Ensemble =

Musical group from British Columbia, Canada

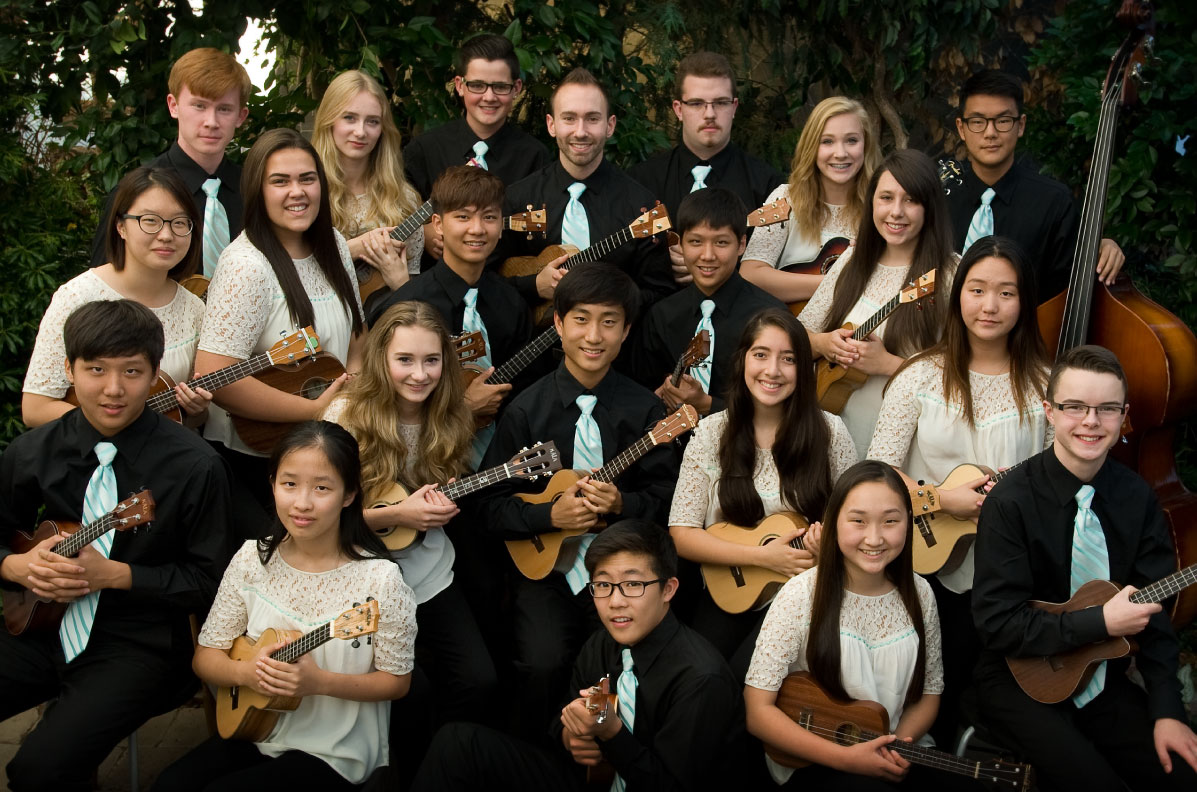
The Langley Ukulele Ensemble in 2015.

The Langley Ukulele Ensemble is a ukulele ensemble from Langley, British Columbia in Canada. The ensemble is internationally renowned and considered to be one of the top ukulele performing ensembles in the world. They were prominently featured in the 2008 award-winning document film, Mighty Uke. The group is composed of 24 musicians, aged twelve to eighteen years, who perform 50-80 concerts a year. The group was originated in 1981 by Peter Luongo using the J. Chalmers Doane's musical program in the 1970s that reached over 50,000 students across Canada and the United States. They have performed in Canada, Florida, Texas, California, Nevada, the Pacific Northwest, Japan, Hawaii, and England. The ensemble was named Langley's Entertainer of the Year for 2005, and Musical Director Peter Luongo was named Langley's Leader of the Year for that same year.

== About ==
The Langley Ukulele Ensemble is the top group in the Langley Ukulele Association. Prior to the association, ukulele was a part of the school curriculum with thousands of children across the province being at a proficient level. With many students playing, Peter Luongo founded the ensemble in 1981 as an honor, extracurricular group. Over time, the want to play the instrument grew so the ensemble grew into an association with multiple groups at different levels: Learning Groups, Intermediate A & B, and Senior A, B & C. The children were placed based on capability and progressed through the levels in hopes of reaching the top performing group through an audition process.

== Tours ==
Since 1985, the Langley Ukulele Ensemble has been traveling to Hawaii in July as part of their annual tour. During their residency, they are sponsored by the Sheraton Waikiki. They perform nightly in the lobby of the Sheraton, as well as additional performances at schools, community events, and with professional ukulele players who are well known within Hawaii.

In summer 2007, the Ensemble participated in the Royal Nova Scotia International Tattoo in Halifax, and opened at the Stratford, Ontario Summer Music Festival. In 2013 they were invited back and performed once again at the Royal Nova Scotia International Tattoo.

In addition to their annual tour to Hawaii, in October 2009 they were the headline performers at the 3rd International Ukulele Ceilidh in Nova Scotia, Canada.

In 2015 they paid a return visit to perform on the River Avon at the Stratford Summer Music Festival, and then traveled to perform on the International Stage at the Canadian National Exhibition in Toronto.

In August, 2026 they travelled to England to perform at the Ukulele Festival of Great Britain. They were the headlining performance.

The Langley Ukulele Ensemble is one of the featured groups in Mighty Uke: The Amazing Comeback of an Underdog. The documentary includes following the ensemble on their annual Hawaiian trip.

Paul Luongo, the 4th son of Peter Luongo, took Peter’s place as the musical director of the Ensemble upon Peter's retirement in 2013. Paul is an alumnus of the Ensemble.

Peter Luongo continues to teach and direct junior ensembles.

== Alumni ==
A renowned alumni of the Langley Ukulele Ensemble include James Hill, who pursued a career as a solo artist and was described by Stuart McLean of the Canadian Broadcasting Corporation as the "Wayne Gretzky of Ukulele".

Other alumni include Paul Luongo (the ensemble's current director), Elizabeth Zielke (former director of the junior ensembles), and acoustic group Exit 58.

The alumni continue to meet and perform together under the direction of Peter Luongo.

== Discography ==
The Ensemble has released twenty recordings on CD, some of which are sung in the Hawaiian language. Musical styles include Classical, Jazz, Gospel, Rock and Roll, Soul, and international music.

- Langley Our Home, Precision Sound (1998) ASIN: B0000C1W2R
- Our Hawaiian Heart, Precision Sound (1999) ASIN: B0000C1W2S
- 20th Anniversary Commemorative Edition Ukulele Family Album (2000)
- I'll Be Home For Christmas (2000)
- The Enchanted Ukulele, Precision Sound (2000) ASIN: B0000C1W2U
- Cruisin' Ukuleles, Precision Sound (2001) ASIN: B0000C1W2W
- Ukulele: The Legend Continues, (2002) ASIN: B0000C1W2X
- The Pacific Ukulele Connection, (2004) ASIN: B0002EXKHE
- Strings Attached (2004)
- 25th Anniversary Ukulele Celebration (2005)
- Ukulele Christmas (2005)
- Our Hawaiian Heart Anniversary Edition (2009)
- Langley Ukulele - Live in Concert DVD (2010)
- Ukulele Rock 'n Roll Review (2013)
- Greatest Hits
- The Next Generation
- Classical Ukuleles
- Canada 150
- One Love, One Heart (2019)
- Celebrate: 40 Years of Enriching Lives Through Music (2021)
