= Gerald Ross =

American musician

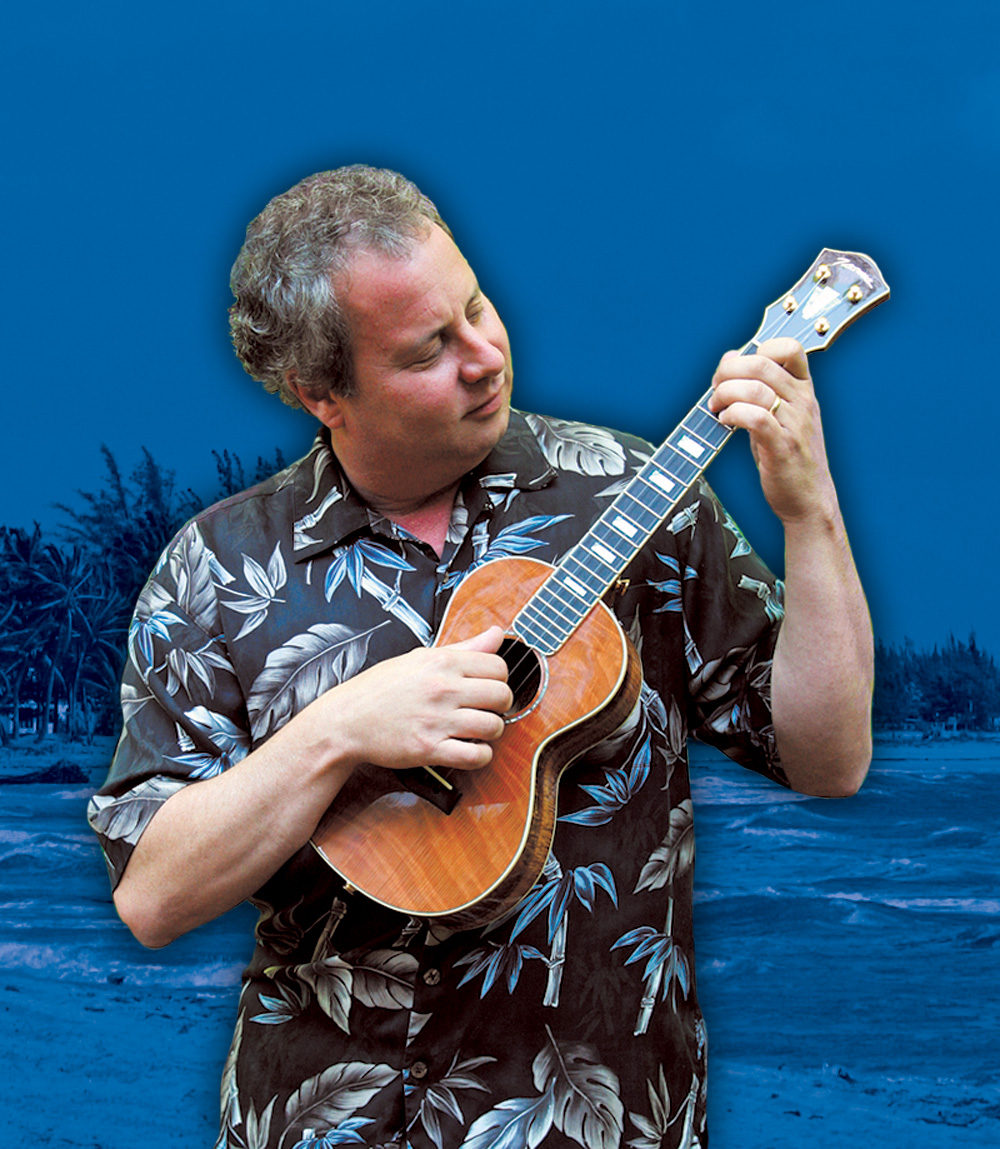

Background information
- Born: September 26, 1954 (age 71); Detroit, United States
- Genres: Swing, traditional jazz, blues, country blues, hawaiian, folk, western swing, swing, ragtime, jugband
- Occupation: Musician
- Instruments: Guitar, Lap steel guitar, Ukulele
- Labels: UkeTone, Brown & Serve
- Member of: The Lost World String Band, The Continental Islanders, The MacPherson Strutters, The Mountain River Valley Boys, Sharkfeet
- Website: geraldross.com

Gerald Ross (born September 26, 1954, Detroit) is a musician specializing in American Roots Music – Swing, Early Jazz, Western Swing, Hawaiian, Ragtime and Blues. Playing the guitar, lap steel guitar and ukulele he has performed throughout the US and Europe and has recorded seven solo CDs. Ross currently tours as a solo act performing and teaching ukulele and steel guitar at festivals and music camps.

== Awards and recognitions ==
1993 – Won the WEMU Jazz Competition (solo artist category)

1998-2004 - Elected to board of directors of the Hawaiian Steel Guitar Association.

2010 – Won the 2010 Hawaii Music Awards Steel Guitar category.

2010 – The aNueNue Ukulele company issued the Gerald Ross Signature Tenor Ukulele.

2011 – Became an artist/endorser for Mya-Moe Ukuleles.

2011 – Became an online columnist for Mel Bay's "Ukulele Sessions".

2011 – Became an endorser for MI-SI instrument pickups.

2012 – Became an endorser for the Kala U-Bass.

2013 – Named Mya-Moe Ukulele Artist of the Month (June)

2013 – Became the music director for the annual Ashokan Uke Fest (2013–2019).

2014 – Gerald's steel guitar work was featured on the Hula Honey's CD 'A Hui Ho'. The CD won the Na Hoku Hanonano Award (Hawaiian Grammys – Jazz category)

2015 – Named UkeFarm Radio Artist of the Month (January)

2018 - Became an endorser for Henriksen amplifiers. Featured in Henriksen print advertisement - Ukulele Magazine, Winter 2017, Spring & Summer 2018, Winter 2019.

2020 - Ukulele Magazine Fall 2020. Full-page feature story about Gerald's two month musical lockdown in Spain during the COVID-19 pandemic.

2021 - Gerald and Marcy Marxer hosted the awards presentation at the World Virtual Ukulele Contest sponsored by CF Martin guitars

2021 - Ukulele Magazine Winter 2021. A four-page feature article profiling Gerald entitled ‘King Of Swing’

2022 - Ukulele Magazine Online. Gerald performs his arrangement of 'Christmas Time Is Here' online in the magazine's Holiday edition.

2024 - Gerald's Swing, Blues and Jazz ukulele instructional site debuts on Patreon. patreon.com/gbross

2025 - Ukulele Magazine 50th issue. Quoted in the feature article ‘Words Of Wisdom’

== Lost World String Band ==
Gerald Ross played guitar, ukulele, Cajun accordion and steel guitar with the LWSB from 1979 - 2011. The Lost World appeared numerous times on American Public Media's A Prairie Home Companion with Garrison Keillor. The band's reputation for on-stage spontaneity and humor secured them a spot as the featured musical act at New York's famed comedy club The Improv for the 1982 New Year's show.

== 2020 Covid-19 Lockdown - Oviedo, Spain ==
In March 2020 a brief work/vacation in Oviedo, Spain became a fifty four day lockdown for Ross and his wife Margaret. Neither contracted COVID-19. Ross recorded four instrumental ukulele videos during the lockdown. Besame Mucho Sunday Magnetic Rag Music To Watch Girls By

=== Discography ===
==== Solo ====
- Romance & Adventure
- Ukulele Stomp
- Moonlight And Shadows
- Ukulele Hit Parade
- Mistletoe Mazel Tov
- Swing Ukulele
- Absolute Uke

==== Collaborations ====
- Stoney Creek – Meet The Creek
- Lost World String Band – Ready To Wear
- After 10 Years – Elderly Instruments (w/MacPherson Strutters)
- Sally Rogers – In The Circle of the Sun
- Wheatland Festival – At This Stage – 30 Years at the Wheatland Festival
- Various Ukulele Artists – Square Pegs And Round Holes
- Yiddishe Cup – Klezmer Guy
- Greg Gattuso (Hilo Greg) – Little Songs For Big Kids
- Bosko & Honey Present... Ukulele Safari Volume 1
- The Beatles Complete on Ukulele – Paperback Writer
- The Beatles Complete on Ukulele – Penny Lane
- Katseye – Makin' Lemonade
- The Hula Honeys – A Hui Hou
- Tree Town Ukes – Veterans Song (guitar)
- Phil Doleman - And (guitar, bass, Dobro - UK release)
- Shawano Folk Festival - 40 years

=== Music Festival Appearances ===
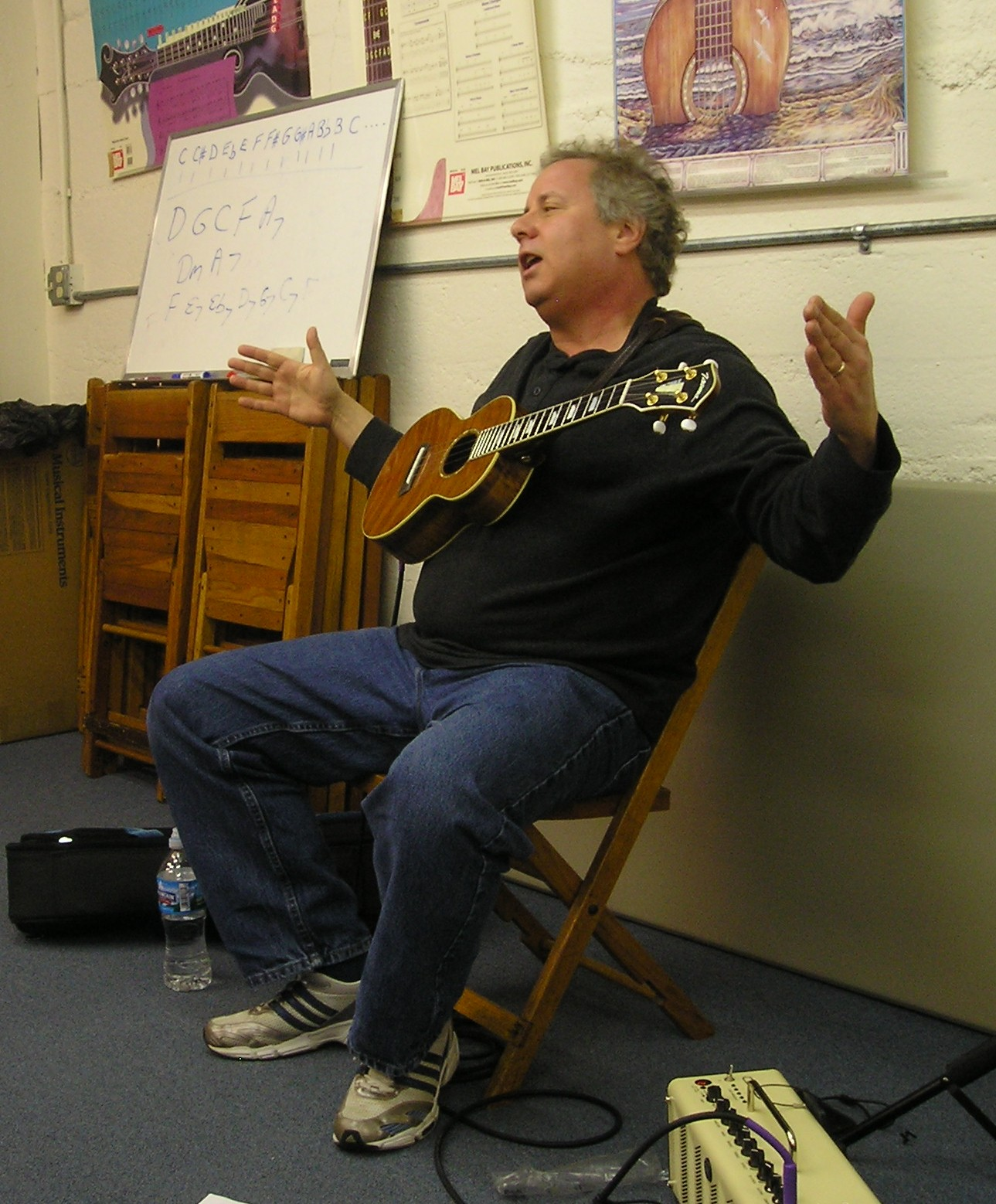
Ross conducting a workshop

Ross makes appearances at a wide variety of venues as documented below. At most events there are workshops where he teaches participants aspects of the ukulele or steel guitar.

==== Europe etc. ====
- Ukulele Festival of Great Britain – Cheltenham, England
- Sevilla Ukulele Festival – Sevilla, Spain
- Ukulele Ceilidh – Liverpool, Nova Scotia, Canada
- Montreal Uke Fest – Montreal, Quebec, Canada
- Ukulele Festival Of Scotland - Dumfries, Scotland
- Vancouver Ukulele Festival – Vancouver, British Columbia, Canada
- Hawaii Island Ukulele Retreat - Big Island, Hawaii
- Czech Ukulele Festival - Prague, Czech Republic
- Royal City Uke Fest - Guelph, Ontario, Canada
- Ukulele Bike And Barge - Avignon, France

==== USA East ====
- Augusta Heritage Swing Week – Elkins, WV
- Ashokan Western & Swing Week – Olivebridge, NY
- Swannanoa Gathering – Guitar Week – Asheville, NC
- Strathmore Uke/Guitar Summit – Bethesda, MD
- Ann Arbor Folk Festival – Ann Arbor, MI
- New York Uke Fest – NY, NY
- M.A.U.I. Ukefest – Annapolis, MD
- New Jersey Uke Fest - Morristown, NJ
- Steve Kaufman’s Acoustic Camp - Maryville, TN
- The Kalamazoo Fretboard Festival – Kalamazoo, MI
- Wheatland Festival – Remus, MI
- Midwest Uke Fest – Indianapolis, IN
- Milwaukee Uke Fest – Milwaukee, WI
- Bliss Fest – Cross Village, MI
- Windy City Uke Fest – Chicago, IL
- Tampa Bay Ukulele Getaway – Tampa, FL
- UkeFest at the Music Center at Strathmore – Bethesda, MD
- UkeFest Virginia – Richmond, VA
- Mighty Uke Day II, IV, V, XI, XVI – Lansing, MI
- Great Bear Music Festival – Bloomingdale, MI
- Ashokan Uke Fest – Olivebridge, NY
- Midwest Uke Fest – Ft. Wayne, IN
- HSGA Hawaiian Music Festival – Joliet, IL
- Belfast Ukulele Festival - Belfast, ME
- Lake Anne Ukulele Festival – Reston, VA
- Uketoberfest Interlochen – Interlochen, MI
- Ukulele Festival of South Florida - Fort Lauderdale, FL
- Funky Frets Uke Fest - Philadelphia, PA
- Allegheny Ukulele Soiree - Altoona, PA
- Midwest Uke Camp - Olivet, MI/Holland, MI
- Guitar Intensives - Bar Harbor, ME
- City Of Lights Uke Fest - Aurora, IL
- Nutmeg Uke Fest - Simsbury, CT

==== USA West ====
- Puget Sound Guitar Workshop – Bremerton, WA
- Palm Springs Uke Fest - Palm Springs, CA
- Wine Country Uke Fest – Napa, CA
- Portland Uke Fest – Portland, OR
- Reno Uke Fest - Reno, NV
- Denver Uke Fest - Denver, CO
- Port Townsend Ukulele Festival - Port Townsend, WA
- Uke U-7 - Bend, OR
- Southern California Uke Fest, Los Angeles, CA
- Uketoberfest – Eugene, OR
- Lone Star UkeFest – Dallas, TX
- West Coast Ukulele Retreat – Pacific Grove, CA
- The California Coast Music Camp – Foresthill, CA
- Mighty Mo Uke Fest – St. Louis, MO
- Menucha Ukulele Band Camp – Portland, OR
- Hawaiian Steel Guitar Festival – Fort Collins, CO
- Colorado Roots Music Camp - Colorado Springs, CO
- NAMM Show - Los Angeles, CA
- Rocky Mountain Uke Fest - Durango, CO
- Ukekopelli Festival - Albuquerque, NM
- Great Minnesota Uke And Bluegrass Gathering - Minneapolis, MN

=== Appears in ===
- Kazoozie Kazoos TV commercial (uncredited – performer/actor and announcer)
- Mighty Uke (uncredited – playing steel guitar at the New York Uke Fest)
- Wheatland – The First 40 Years (Photos and soundtrack with the Lost World String Band)
