= John King (ukulelist) =

American musician (1953–2009)

John Robert King
- Born: October 13, 1953.
- Died: April 3, 2009
- Occupation: interpretation of classical music

John Robert King (John) (October 13, 1953 – April 3, 2009) was a ukulele player known for his interpretation of classical music.

== Early life and education ==
The son of a navy pilot, King was born in San Diego. His father's position took the young King to Hawaii for a few years in his childhood, where he was introduced to the ukulele by his mother. Despite his early start in the ukulele, he initially showed no aptitude for the instrument, but quickly became a proficient guitar player, studying at one point with both Pepe Romero and his father Celedonio.

King attended Old Dominion University and later took a post as a guitar teacher at Eckerd College—where he taught for 30 years—in St. Petersburg, a city that became his home for life.

== Ukulele revolution ==
Upon learning that the ancestor of the modern guitar was tuned similarly to the ukulele, he reacquainted himself with the instrument, commissioning an Italian luthier to make a classical ukulele for him. With it, he revived a guitar-playing technique from the Baroque era: succeeding notes are played on different strings, allowing the previous note to continue ringing. Known as campanella style, which means 'little bells' in Latin. His influential book The Classical Ukulele is part of Jim Beloff's Jumpin’ Jim's Ukulele Masters series.

King's repertoire ranged widely, but he is particularly noted for his interpretation of Johann Sebastian Bach. In 2008, the Journal of the Society for American Music called King "perhaps the world's only true classical 'ukulele virtuoso'".

Luthier Joel Eckhaus made King's "Strad Uke" modeled after one of the five Stradivari guitars.

King is featured in a short segment in the extras on the DVD release of Mighty Uke: The Amazing Comeback of a Musical Underdog, a 2010 documentary on the ukulele.

According to The Journal of the Society for American Music, John King is "the worlds only truly classical ukulele virtuoso".

== Works ==
King recorded two records and wrote several books of ukulele arrangements. He did extensive research into the history of classical guitar and the ukulele, writing numerous essays. He wrote an encyclopedia of Hawaiian luthiers. He was working on a history of the ukulele with Jim Tranquada at the time of his death which was published in 2012, The Ukulele: A History, published by the University of Hawaii Press.

== Death ==
King died of a heart attack at his home at the age of 55.

== Works and external links ==
- Bach Prelude: John King ukulele on YouTube
- Bach Bouree from BWV 1006: John King ukulele on YouTube
- King, John (November–December 2005). "How I Learned to Play the 'Ukulele" (PDF). Spirit of Aloha. Aloha Airlines.
- King, John; Tranquada, Jim (2003). "New History of the Origins and Development of the 'Ukulele, 1838-1915". Hawaiian Journal of History. 37: 1–34. hdl:10524/382.
- King, John (2003). The Hawaiian Ukulele and Guitar Makers 1884-1930 As Listed in the Honolulu City Directory and Other Contemporary Sources. NALU music. ISBN 978-0-9729385-0-1. ISBN 0-9729385-0-8.
