= Jane Soley Hamilton =

Jane Soley Hamilton (née Soley, 1805 – October 2, 1897) of Brookfield, Nova Scotia was a noted pioneer midwife and has been cited by many sources as an important figure in midwifery, nursing and medical practice in Canada.

Jane Soley was born in 1805, the daughter of William and Mary Soley of Lower Truro.

She married Robert Hamilton of Brookfield in 1825 and over the next 16 years gave birth to seven children, two of whom died in infancy. In July 1851, when her youngest was nearly 10 years old, Jane was called upon to assist at the birth of a relative. This started Jane on the career of midwifery that was to span 42 years and bring 776 children into the world.

She officiated at most of the births in Hilden, Brookfield, Brentwood, Alton and Middle Stewiacke. Her work covered the years 1851 to 1893 during which time she kept careful record in a small tattered almanac of all of these births, dates, parents' names, and whether or not it was a difficult delivery.
