= Andy Iona =

American musician

Andrew Aiona Long
- Born: January 1, 1902; Waimea, Kauai County, Hawaii, U.S.
- Died: November 9, 1966 (aged 64); Santa Anita, California, U.S.
- Spouse: Leimomi (Lillian) Woodds
- Children: Lanette, Edra, Andrea Iona Sheehan

Andy Iona (born Andrew Aiona Long, January 1, 1902 – November 9, 1966) was an American musician and one of Hawaii's most influential musicians. He was a composer, songwriter, conductor, saxophonist, and steel guitarist. He went to the Kamehameha School for Boys. He was also educated at Henri Berger's Private School of Music in Honolulu.

He was a member of the radio station KHS staff orchestra. He went on to form his own group called Andy Iona and his Islanders, which mixed traditional Hawaiian melodies with American swing; the band appeared in films, hotels, and theatres, and on records. He composed songs for the American Society of Composers, Authors, and Publishers after joining in 1940, and recorded the music for two Soundies in 1941. Long toured with Sonja Henie for 12 years.

He married Leimomi Woodds and had three children.

== Music ==
- Public domain song: Andy Iona - Pretty Red Hibiscus
- Public domain song: Andy Iona - Naughty Hula Eyes
- Box set (6 CDs - 112 tracks): The Andy Iona Collection - Andy Iona and his Islanders, Cumquat Records.
- Album: Hawaiians In Hollywood: Smooth, Sweet & Swinging 1934-1936: Volume 1 by Andy Iona.
- Album: From Honolulu To Hollywood: Jazz, Blues & Popular Specialties Performed Hawaiian Style by King Bennie Nawahi, Sol Hoopii, Andy Iona.
- Album: Jazz Goes Hawaiian by Louis Armstrong feat. Andy Iona, Challenge Records.
