= J. Chalmers Doane =

Canadian educator and musician

- Born: John Chalmers Doane; 1938 (age 87–88); Truro, Nova Scotia, Canada
- Occupations: Educator, musician
- Instruments: Trombone, ukulele, piano
- Years active: 1971–1993
- Website: chalmersdoane.com

J. Chalmers Doane CM ONS (born 1938) is a Canadian educator and musician who spearheaded the use of the ukulele for music instruction in the Canadian school systems.

== Educator ==
John Chalmers Doane was born in Truro, Nova Scotia in 1938. Doane earned his teaching certificate in 1961 from the Nova Scotia Teachers College (NSTC) and then a bachelor of music education from Boston University in 1967 studying the trombone. While serving as supervisor of music for the Halifax Regional School Board from 1967 to 1984, Doane changed the school music program when he began using the ukulele as a practical and economical method of teaching instruments and music for both children and adults. This unconventional approach was quickly proven through the success of Halifax school bands and orchestras in concerts and competitions across Canada.

Doane created the Guide to Classroom Ukulele in 1971. The British Columbia schools used Doane's system to teach music and as a result, the Langley Ukulele Ensemble came into existence. He improved on the system and created the Teacher's Guide to Classroom Ukulele in 1977.

After leaving the Halifax School Board in 1984, Doane served as a professor of music education at his alma mater, the Nova Scotia Teachers College until his retirement in 1993.

The best known student to come out of Doane's program is James Hill, who plays the ukulele throughout the world and worked with Doane to revise the ukulele teaching system. Doane and Hill collaborated to create the Ukulele in the Classroom program in 2008.

Doane was awarded an honorary doctor of fine arts from St. Mary's University in 2003.

His daughter Melanie Doane is a noted Canadian pop singer and songwriter, and his son Creighton Doane is a drummer and songwriter known as a collaborator with his sister and as a member of the rock band Harem Scarem. Doane himself has recorded a number of albums since 1973, many featuring original compositions or arrangements, mainly featuring Halifax students, but also in the 2000s with his own group, the Chalmers Doane Trio.

In 2026, Doane was the first Canadian to be inducted into the Ukulele Hall of Fame in Hawaii.

== Awards ==
- 8 February 2005 – Doane was invested as a member of the Order of Canada.
- 2008 – The Learning Partnership honored Doane as a champion of public education
- 2010 – Doane was inducted into the Order of Nova Scotia.

== Writing ==
- Classroom Ukulele Method (Waterloo 1971)
- Ukulele Encore (Waterloo 1975)
- The Teachers' Guide to Classroom Ukulele (Waterloo 1977)
- Functional Piano (Waterloo 1980)
- Classroom Ukulele Method: Hawaiian Version (Halifax 1988)

== Discography ==
- Ukulele Yes!, 1973, Audat Records, 477-4012
- Ukuleles on Tour, 1974, Audat Records, 477-4016
- Ukulele Magic, 1975, Halifax School Board C-142
- An Introduction to Ukulele Basics with J. Chalmers Doane, 1976, Wat WR-9
- Ukulele Solos, 1976, Wat CSPS-1015
- Musical Ride, 1978, Wat WR-17
- Halifax Ukuleles and Fiddles, 1979, Wat WR-20
- Ukulele Express, 1979, Wat WR-19
- Ukuleles East, 1982, Wat WR-8025
- Uke Trio, 1982, Wat WR-8024
- Live At The Soho Kitchen, Chalmers Doane Trio, 2001
- Farm Sessions Vol II, Chalmers Doane Trio, 2006
