= Taimane Gardner =

American ukulele virtuoso and composer

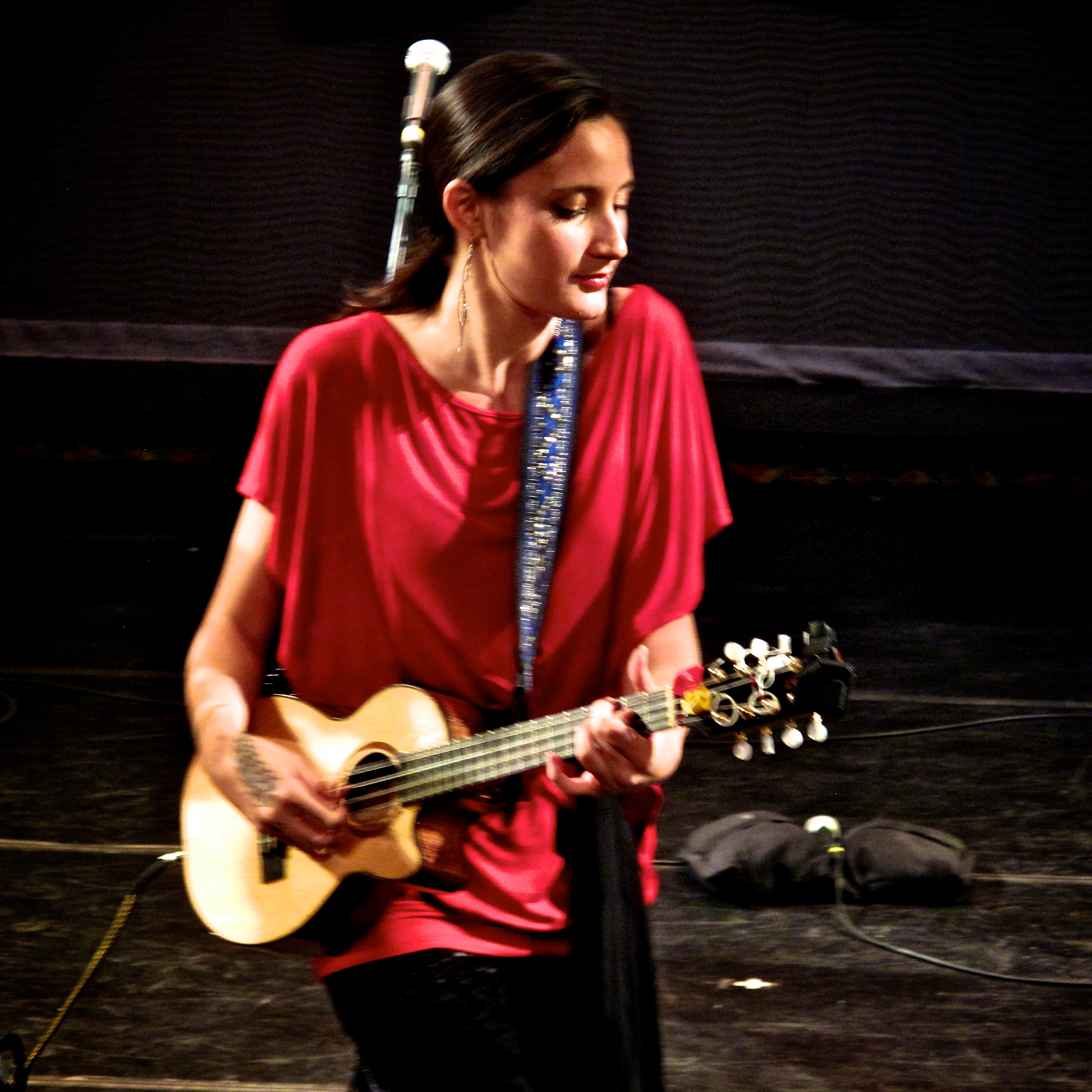

Background information
- Born: Taimane Tauiliili Bobby Gardner; February 13, 1989 (age 37); Honolulu, Hawaii, U.S.
- Occupations: Musician, composer
- Instruments: Ukulele, Guitar, Vocals

Taimane Tauiliili Bobby Gardner, (born February 13, 1989) who often performs under the mononym Taimane, is an American ukulele virtuoso and composer. In 2019, she won a Nā Hōkū Hanohano award, for Favorite Entertainer of the Year. In 2019, her song "Water", from her album, Elemental, was nominated for Instrumental Composition of the Year by Nā Hoku Hanohano Awards.

== Early life ==
Gardner was born in Honolulu, Hawaii, to Jack and Elva Gardner, and is of Samoan, German, Irish, French, and Swedish descent. Her name translates to diamond in the Samoan language. Gardner began playing the ukulele at the age of 5 and attended Roy Sakuma’s ukulele school. She was discovered by legendary musician Don Ho at age 13 and also studied under Jake Shimabukuro as a teenager. She graduated from the Honolulu Waldorf School before attending Kapiʻolani Community College.

== Career ==
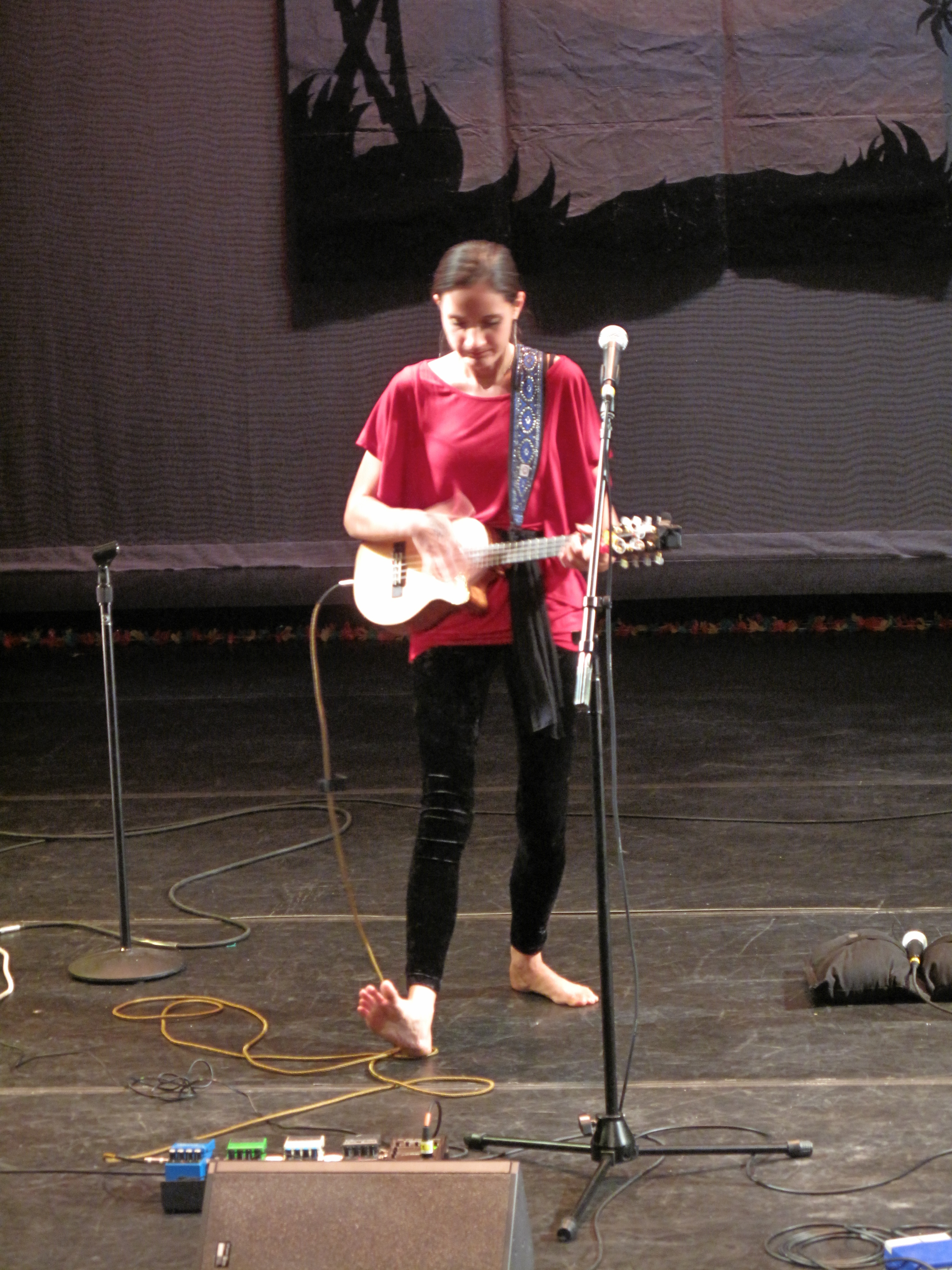
Taimane performing barefoot on stage

Taimane became a popular local musician on the Waikiki performance circuit as a teenager. In 2005, she released her first album Loco Princess. Her album Life – The Art & Beauty of Being Human was released in 2008. Other released solo projects include Ukulele Dance in 2012, We Are Made of Stars in 2015, Elemental in 2018 and Hawaiki (2022).

Taimane has performed internationally in Japan and Hong Kong. Her album We Are Made of Stars was nominated for Ukulele Album of the Year at the 2016 Na Hoku Hanohano Awards. Taimane has also been recognized for her cover medley performances, including a spot on the Guitar World Magazine Top 10 Ukulele Moments list. On March 13, 2020, Taimane performed on NPR's Tiny Desk series.

Taimane frequently performs barefoot.

== Discography ==
Albums

- Loco Princess (2005)
- Life – The Art & Beauty of Being Human (2008)
- Ukulele Dance (2012)
- Taimane... Live (Year unknown)
- We Are Made of Stars (2015)
- Elemental (2018)
- Hawaiki (2022)
