= Anne Janelle =

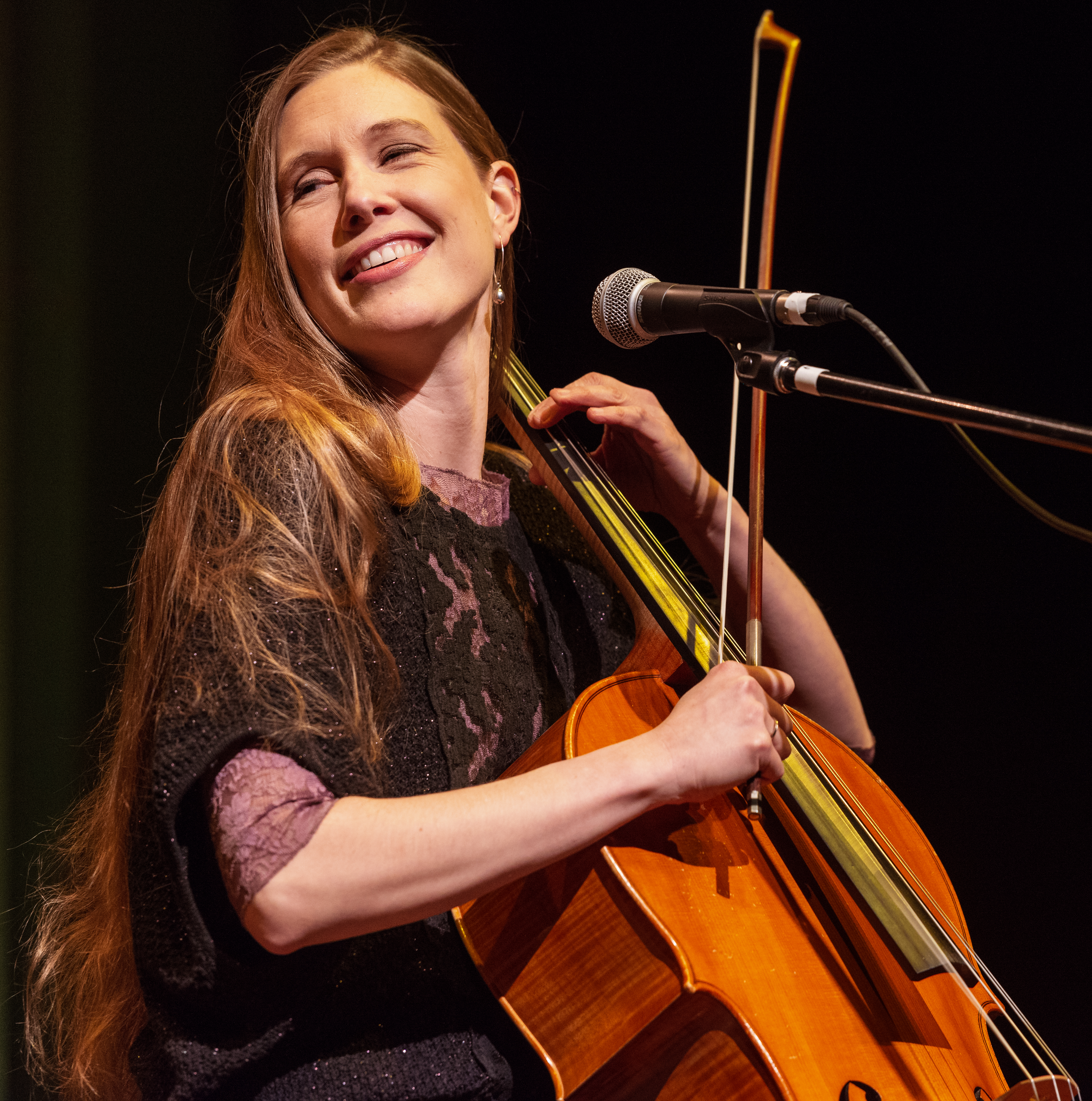
- Janelle performs in 2018

Background information
- Also known as: Anne Davison
- Born: Canada
- Genres: Folk, blues, Classical music
- Occupation: Musician
- Instrument: Cello
- Years active: 2002–present
- Website: annejanelle.com

Anne Janelle is a classically trained Canadian musician who has focused on the cello and songwriting.

== Education ==
Janelle earned a Bachelor of Music degree from the University of British Columbia studying classical music and the cello. Janelle has also earned a master's degree in cello performance from the University of Ottawa.

== Performances ==
Janelle has performed with artists such as Stuart McLean, Kanye West, Bruce Cockburn, and Holly Cole. She has also flourished in contemporary music, experimenting deeply with free improvisation in both music and dance. Her cello is often heard backing up other artists, as on the William Hawkins tribute album Dancing Alone: Songs of William Hawkins.

Since 2006 Janelle has been collaborating and touring with James Hill. Hill and Janelle, then known as Anne Davison, collaborated on True Love Don't Weep. The CD was the winner of the 2009 Canadian Folk Music Awards Traditional Album of the Year. She appears with Hill in Mighty Uke: The Amazing Comeback of a Musical Underdog, a 2010 documentary on the ukulele.

Janelle plays a wide variety of songs, everything from folk, jazz, bluegrass and avant-garde. She pushes the boundaries of cello music by combining it with her voice and the music of James Hill. Her new band Champagne Weather combines her various influences.

== Concerts of note ==
- Canadian Museum of Civilization Gatineau 2007
- Bronson Centre Ottawa 2007
- Pustervik Theatre, Goteborg, Sweden 2008
- Cairns Ukulele Festival 2010
- Concerts on Markland 2012
- Calgary Folk Festival 2014
- Winnipeg Folk Festival 2014
- Vancouver Folk Festival 2014
- Mariposa Folk Festival, Orillia 2016
- Schlossbergbühne Kasematten Graz, Austria 2018
- Old Town School of Folk Music, Chicago 2018
- Lotus World Music Festival, Bloomington, 2018
- Sisters Folk Festival 2018
- Shetland Folk Festival 2018
- Festival Place, Sherwood Park 2018
- Lunenburg Folk Harbour Festival 2022
- The Green Note London, UK 2024
- Aurora Cultural Centre 2026
- Marigold Cultural Centre Truro, N.S. 2026

== Personal life ==
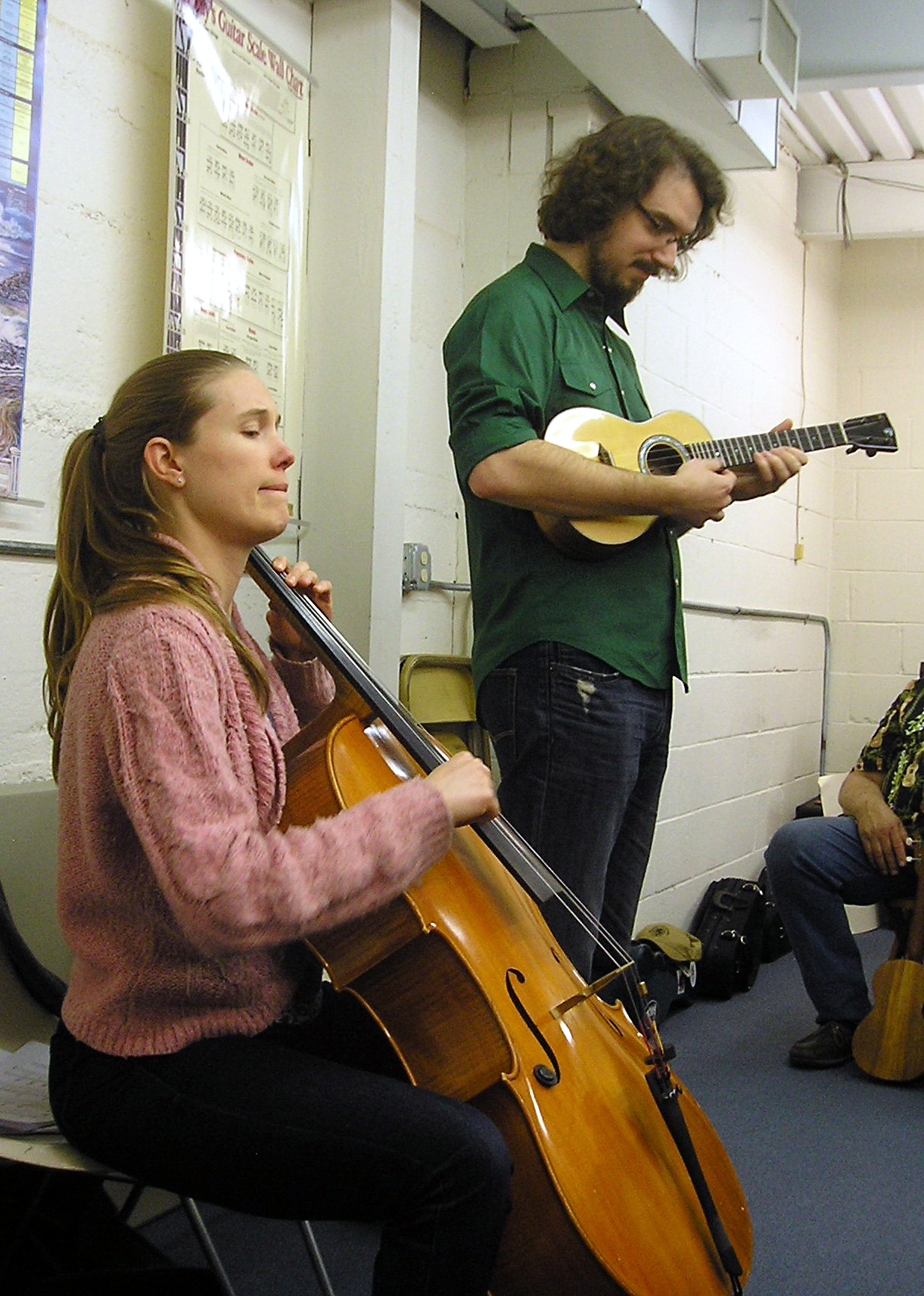
Janelle and James Hill in 2013

Currently Janelle lives in Nova Scotia with her husband and touring partner James Hill. They met at the University of British Columbia and were married on September 21, 2013.

== Discography ==
=== Primary artist ===
- True Love Don't Weep (duo album with James Hill) – Linus Entertainment – August 11, 2009
- Beauty Remains – April 21, 2012
- So Long at the Fair – Anne Janelle Records – January 20, 2014
- Ah, Poor Bird (single) – Anne Janelle Records – February 17, 2014
- I Didn't Want to Break It – Anne Janelle Records – November 1, 2016
- How Best to See the Light – Second Daughter Records – October 20, 2023
- The Midnight Clear (duo album with James Hill) – Crystal Lake Media – November 24, 2023

=== Contributing artist ===
- Dancing Alone – Songs of William Hawkins – True North Records – September 29, 2008
- Walking the Bones – Ian Tamblyn – 2011
- Skyline – Shawna Caspi – 2012
- Man With a Love Song – James Hill – October 11, 2011
- The Old Silo – James Hill – September 16, 2014
- The Fragile Tangent – Ian Tamblyn – July 2, 2026
