= James Hill (Canadian musician) =

Canadian ukulele musician (born 1980)

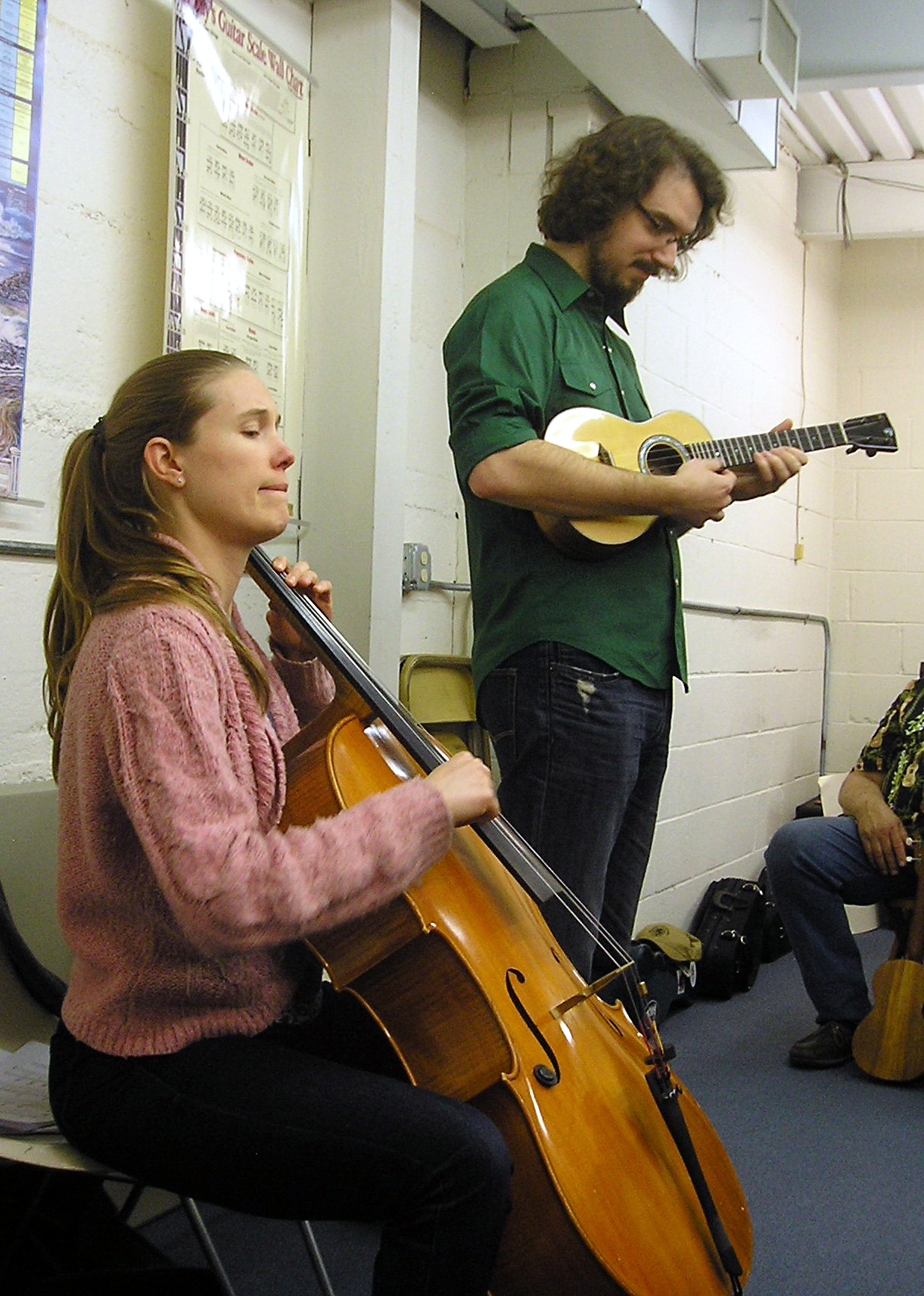

Background information
- Born: 1980 (age 45–46); Canada
- Genres: Folk, blues
- Occupations: Musician, educator
- Instrument: Ukulele
- Years active: 2002–present
- Website: jameshillmusic.com

James Hill (born 1980) is a Canadian classically trained musician who has focused on the ukulele, both as his primary instrument and as a method of music instruction for school children. He earned a Bachelor of Music degree from the University of British Columbia.

He teaches the ukulele on his platform Uketropolis, which has several courses ranging from beginner to advanced. He is also the host of the Uketropolis podcast.

== Music education ==
As a child, Hill benefited from a ukulele instructional program created by J. Chalmers Doane as shared in Teacher's Guide to Classroom Ukulele, 1977. The British Columbia school used Doane's system to teach music, and as a result, the Langley Ukulele Ensemble came into existence. Hill participated in the ensemble for over ten years.

Hill envisioned creating a program to help spread this instrument and upon meeting Doane, they collaborated to create the "Ukulele in the Classroom" program in 2008.

Hill seldom makes a concert appearance without also conducting workshops. He has taught throughout Canada and the United States, as well as in Europe, Japan, Singapore and New Zealand. He regularly lectures at the Queen's School of Music in Kingston, Ontario and has been a guest instructor at the Ukulele and Slack Key Guitar Institute held in Waimea, Hawaii each year.

== Performances ==
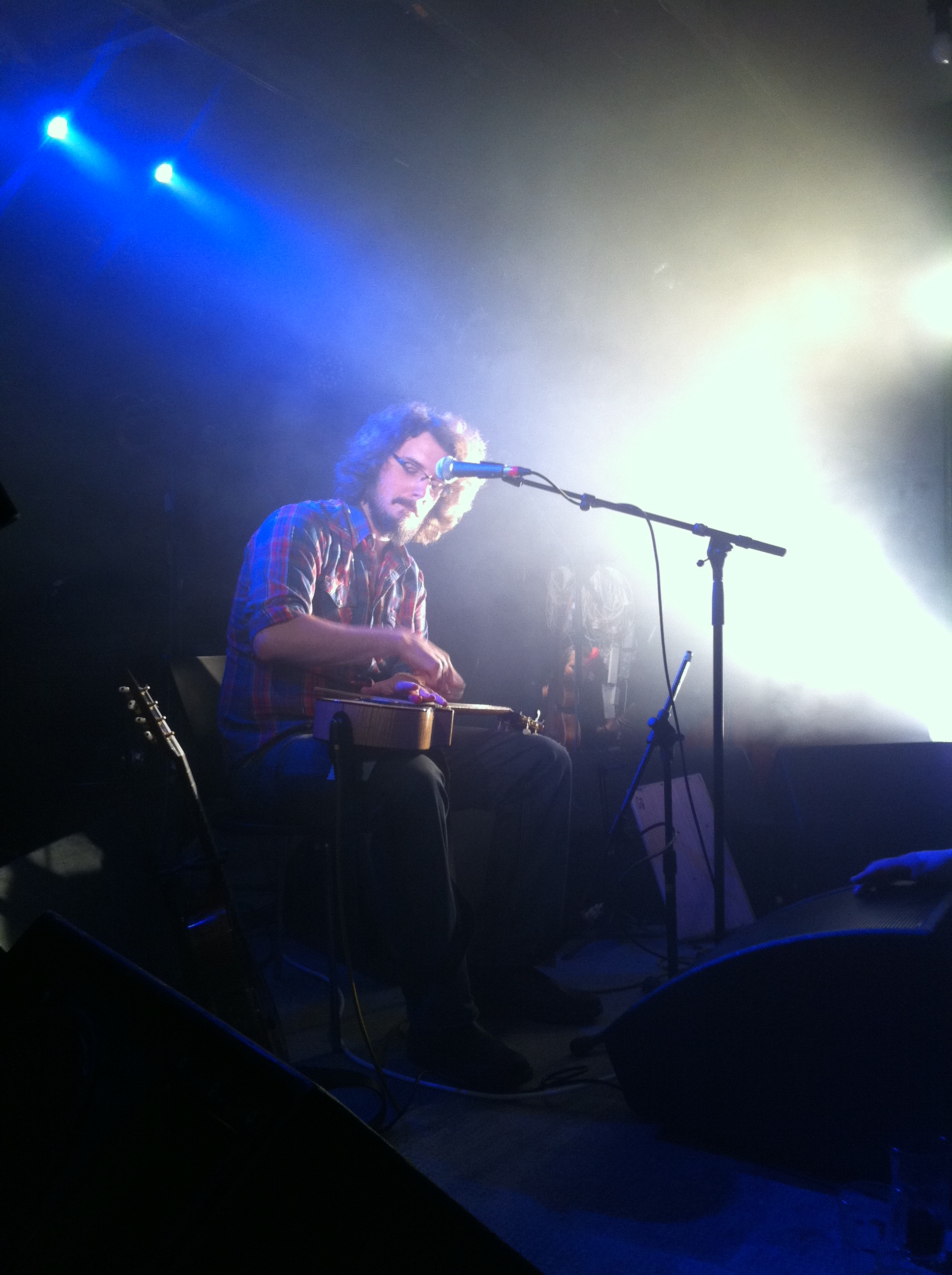
James Hill playing a prepared ukulele in New Zealand in 2011

Traveling throughout the world, Hill has played such venues as The Kennedy Center in July 2009 and The 40th Ukulele Festival in Hawaii.

He appeared at the Ukulele Festival of Great Britain in summer 2013.

He also appeared at the 10th anniversary Ukulele Hooley festival in August 2019 at Dun Laoghaire, Ireland. Ukulele Hooley is Europe’s longest running ukulele festival.

Hill plays a variety of ukuleles; he has several Mike DaSilva custom made ukuleles, all with spruce tops, as well as a Mya Moe Tenor and a Beltona Resonator.

== Awards ==
In 2009, Hill collaborated with Anne Janelle (formerly Anne Davison) on cello and created the CD True Love Don't Weep. The Album won the 2009 Canadian Folk Music Awards Traditional Album of the Year.

In 2015, his album The Old Silo was nominated for the Juno Award for Roots & Traditional Album of the Year – Solo.

== Personal life ==
Currently Hill lives in Nova Scotia with his wife and touring partner Anne Janelle and their son. They were married on 21 September 2013.

== Discography ==
- Playing it Like it Isn't (2002)
- On the Other Hand (2003)
- Fantasy For Ukulele (exclusively released in Japan) (2005)
- A Flying Leap – Borealis Recording (13 June 2006)
- True Love Don't Weep (collaboration with Anne Davison) – Linus Entertainment – (11 August 2009) 2009 Canadian Folk Music Awards Traditional Album of the Year
- Man with a Love Song – Borealis Recording (11 October 2011)
- The Old Silo – Borealis Recording (16 September 2014)
- Uke Heads (16 February 2024)

== Publications ==
- Ukulele in the Classroom – James Hill Ukulele Method Series, Book I – by James Hill & J. Chalmers Doane, Crystal Lake Media (2008) ISBN 978-0980932607
- Ukulele in the Classroom – James Hill Ukulele Method Series, Book II – by James Hill & J. Chalmers Doane, Crystal Lake Media (2008)
- Ukulele in the Classroom – James Hill Ukulele Method Series, Book III – by James Hill & J. Chalmers Doane, Crystal Lake Media (2008)
- The Ukulele Way - Book 1 by James Hill ISBN 978-0-9868536-2-3
- The Ukulele Way - Book 2 by James Hill ISBN 978-0-9868536-4-7
- The Ukulele Way - Book 3 by James Hill ISBN 978-0-9868536-6-1
- The Ukulele Way - Book 4 by James Hill ISBN 978-0-9868536-8-5
- The Ukulele Way - Book 5 by James Hill ISBN 978-1-927726-00-6
- The Ukulele Way - Book 6 by James Hill ISBN 978-1-927726-02-0
- Jumpin' Jim's Ukulele Masters: James Hill — Duets For One, Flea Market Music, Inc.,(2017) ISBN 978-1540003041
