= Ukulele =

Musical instrument of the guitar family

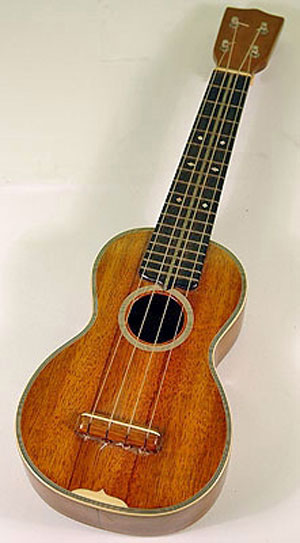
- Martin 3K Ukulele

String instrument
- Classification: Stringed instrument (plucked, nylon-stringed instrument usually played with the bare thumb and/or fingertips, or a felt pick)
- Hornbostel–Sachs classification: 321.322 (Composite chordophone)
- Developed: 19th century in Hawaii (introduced by the Portuguese)

Playing range
- C4–A5 (C6 tuning)

Related instruments
- Bowed and plucked stringed instruments, in particular the cavaquinho

Sound sample
- Soprano ukulele

Ukulele made by Jonah Kumalae c. 1910

The ukulele (/ˌjuːkəˈleɪli/ YOO-kə-LAY-lee; Hawaiian: [ʔukulele]), also called a uke (informally), is a member of the lute (ancestor of the guitar) family of instruments. The ukulele is of Portuguese origin and was popularized in Hawaii. The tone and volume of the instrument vary with size and construction. Ukuleles commonly come in four sizes: soprano, concert, tenor, and baritone.

Ukuleles generally have four nylon strings tuned to GCEA (except baritone, which is normally tuned DGBE). They have 16–22 frets depending on the size.

== History ==
Developed in the 1880s, the ukulele is based on several small, guitar-like instruments of Portuguese origin, the machete, cavaquinho and rajão, introduced to the Hawaiian Islands by Portuguese immigrants from Madeira, the Azores, and Cape Verde. Three immigrants in particular, Madeiran cabinet makers Manuel Nunes, José do Espírito Santo, and Augusto Dias, are generally credited as the first ukulele makers. Two weeks after they disembarked from the SS Ravenscrag in late August 1879, the Hawaiian Gazette reported that "Madeira Islanders recently arrived here, have been delighting the people with nightly street concerts."

One of the most important factors in establishing the ukulele in Hawaiian music and culture was the ardent support and promotion of the instrument by King Kalākaua. A patron of the arts, he incorporated it into performances at royal gatherings.

In the Hawaiian language the word ukulele roughly translates as 'jumping flea', perhaps because of the movement of the player's fingers. Legend attributes it to the nickname of Englishman Edward William Purvis, one of King Kalākaua's officers, because of his small size, fidgety manner, and playing expertise. One of the earliest appearances of the word ukulele in print (in the sense of a stringed instrument) is in the Metropolitan Museum of Art's Catalogue of the Crosby Brown Collection of Musical Instruments of All Nations published in 1907. The catalog describes two ukuleles from Hawaii—one that is similar in size to a modern soprano ukulele, and one that is similar to a tenor (see § Types and sizes).

=== Canada ===
In the 1960s, educator J. Chalmers Doane dramatically changed school music programs across Canada, using the ukulele as an inexpensive and practical teaching instrument to foster musical literacy in the classroom. At its peak, 50,000 schoolchildren and adults learned the ukulele through the Doane program. "Ukulele in the Classroom", a revised program created by James Hill and Doane in 2008, is a staple of music education in Canada.

In 2026, he was inducted into the Ukulele Hall of Fame in Hawaii.

=== Japan ===
The ukulele arrived in Japan in 1929 after Hawaiian-born Yukihiko Haida returned to the country upon his father's death and introduced the instrument. Haida and his brother Katsuhiko formed the Moana Glee Club, enjoying rapid success in an environment of growing enthusiasm for Western popular music, particularly Hawaiian and jazz. During World War II, authorities banned most music from the West, but fans and players kept it alive in secret, and it resumed popularity after the war. In 1959, Haida founded the Nihon Ukulele Association. Japan has since become a second home for Hawaiian musicians and ukulele virtuosos.

=== United Kingdom ===
British singer and comedian George Formby was a ukulele player, though he often played a banjolele, a hybrid instrument consisting of an extended ukulele neck with a banjo resonator body. Demand surged in the new century because of its relative simplicity and portability. Another British ukulele player was Tony Award-winner Tessie O'Shea, who appeared in numerous movies and stage shows, and was twice on The Ed Sullivan Show, including the night the Beatles debuted in 1964. The Ukulele Orchestra of Great Britain tours globally, and the George Formby Society, established in 1961, continues to hold regular conventions.

George Harrison, Paul McCartney, and John Lennon all played the ukulele. Harrison, who was a Formby fan, was a great lover of the instrument and often gave them to friends, including Tom Petty, whom he taught to play.

=== United States mainland ===
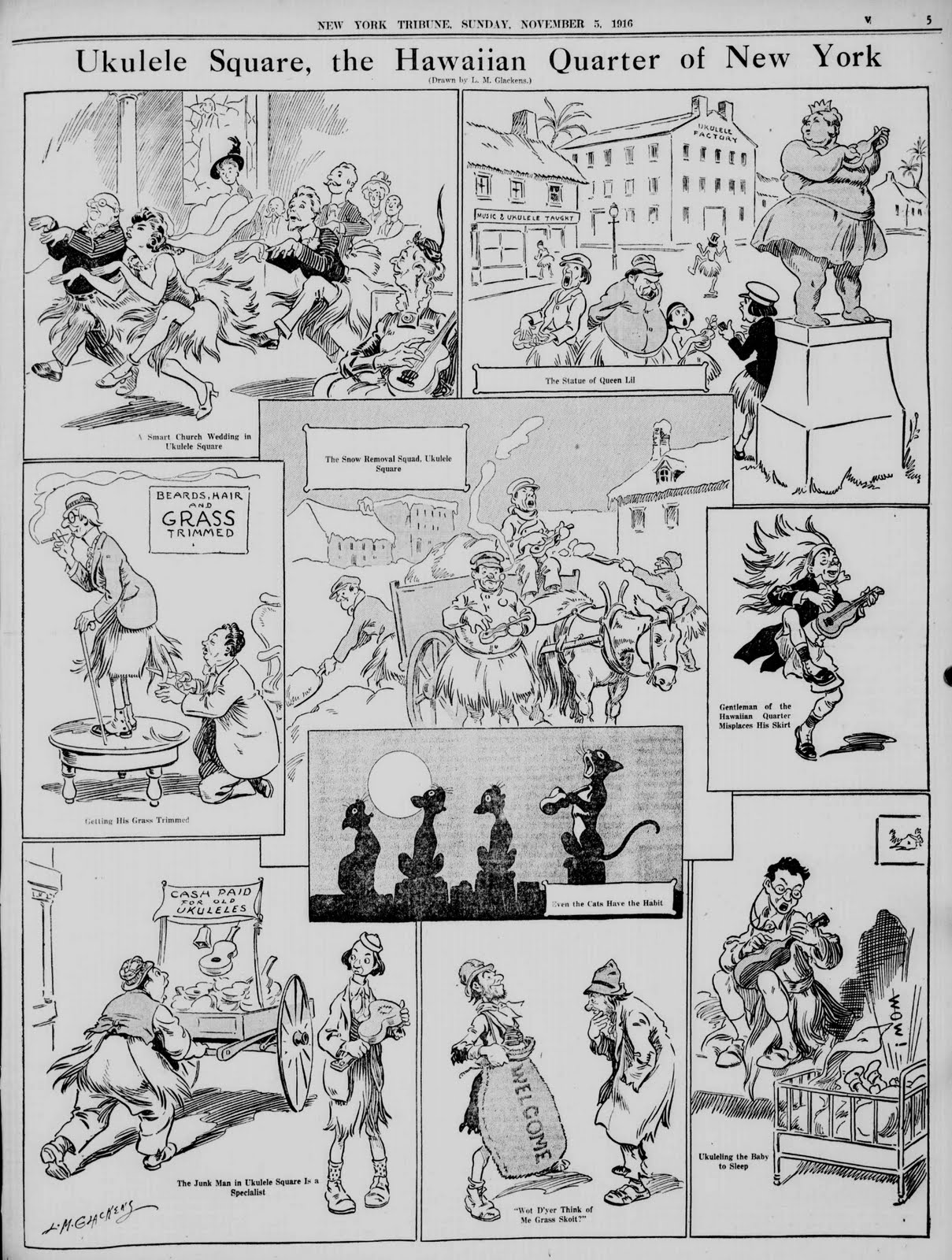
1916 cartoon by Louis M. Glackens satirizing the contemporary ukulele craze.

==== Pre–World War II ====
The ukulele was popularized for a stateside audience during the Panama–Pacific International Exposition, held from spring to autumn of 1915 in San Francisco. The Hawaiian Pavilion featured a guitar and ukulele ensemble, George E. K. Awai and his Royal Hawaiian Quartet, along with ukulele maker and player Jonah Kumalae. The popularity of the ensemble with visitors launched a fad for Hawaiian-themed songs among Tin Pan Alley songwriters. The ensemble also introduced both the lap steel guitar and the ukulele into U.S. mainland popular music, where it was taken up by vaudeville performers such as Roy Smeck and Cliff "Ukulele Ike" Edwards. On April 15, 1923, at the Rivoli Theater in New York City, Smeck appeared, playing the ukulele, in Stringed Harmony, a short film made in the DeForest Phonofilm sound-on-film process. On August 5, 1926, Smeck appeared playing the ukulele in a short film His Pastimes, made in the Vitaphone sound-on-disc process, shown with the feature film Don Juan starring John Barrymore.

The ukulele soon became an icon of the Jazz Age. Like guitar, basic ukulele skills can be learned fairly easily, and this highly portable, relatively inexpensive instrument was popular with amateur players throughout the 1920s, as evidenced by the introduction of uke chord tablature into the published sheet music for popular songs of the time (a role that was supplanted by the guitar in the early years of rock and roll). A number of mainland-based stringed-instrument manufacturers, among them Regal, Harmony, and especially Martin, added ukulele, banjolele, and tiple lines to their production to take advantage of the demand.

The ukulele also made inroads into early country music or old-time music parallel to the then-popular mandolin. It was played by Jimmie Rodgers and Ernest V. Stoneman, as well as by early string bands, including Cowan Powers and his Family Band, Da Costa Woltz's Southern Broadcasters, Walter Smith and Friends, The Blankenship Family, The Hillbillies, and The Hilltop Singers.

==== Post–World War II ====
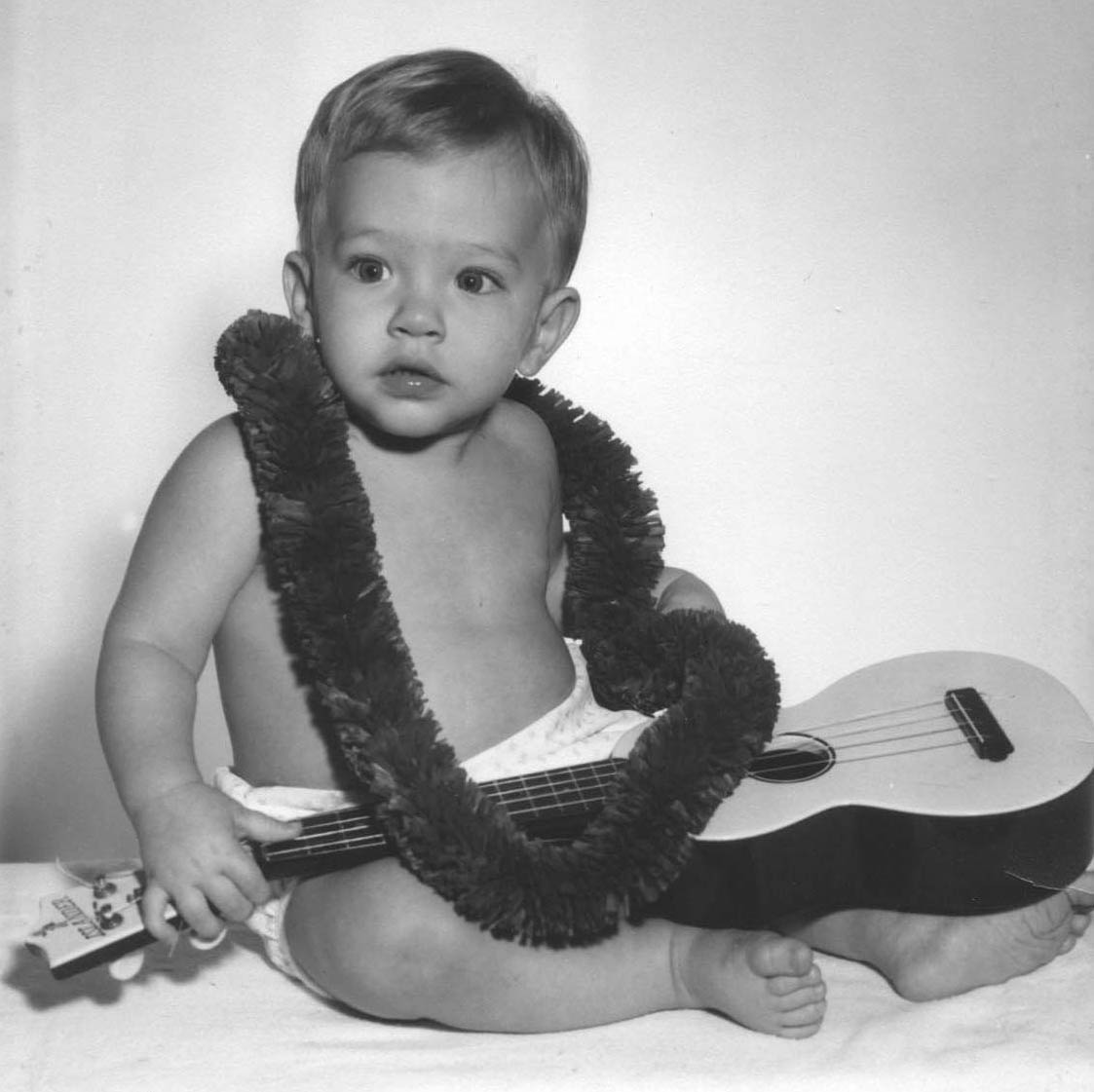
Boy in Hawaii with a Maccaferri 'Islander' plastic ukulele, 1959

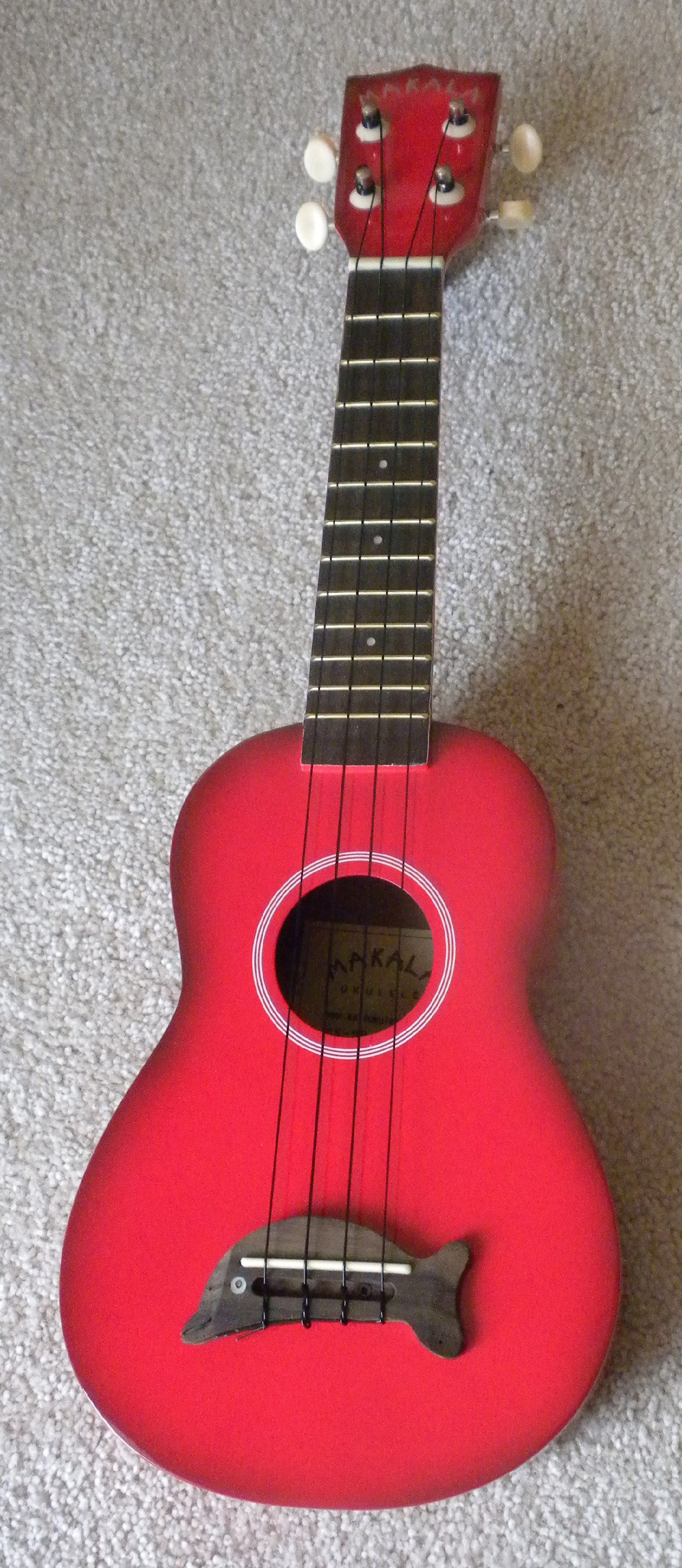
A red ukulele

From the late 1940s to the late 1960s, plastics manufacturer Mario Maccaferri turned out about 9 million inexpensive ukuleles. The ukulele remained popular, appearing in many jazz songs throughout the 50s, '60s, and '70s. Much of the instrument's popularity (particularly the baritone size) was cultivated by Arthur Godfrey on The Arthur Godfrey Show on television. In 1959 the Ukulele made an iconic appearance played by Marilyn Monroe as the character "Sugar Kane" in the movie Some Like It Hot, notably during the band's rendition of Runnin' Wild. Singer-musician Tiny Tim became closely associated with the instrument after playing it on his 1968 hit "Tiptoe Through the Tulips".

The ukulele had what is considered a hibernation period from the 1960s, as the small acoustic instrument was unable to compete with the big, popular sound of rock 'n' roll.

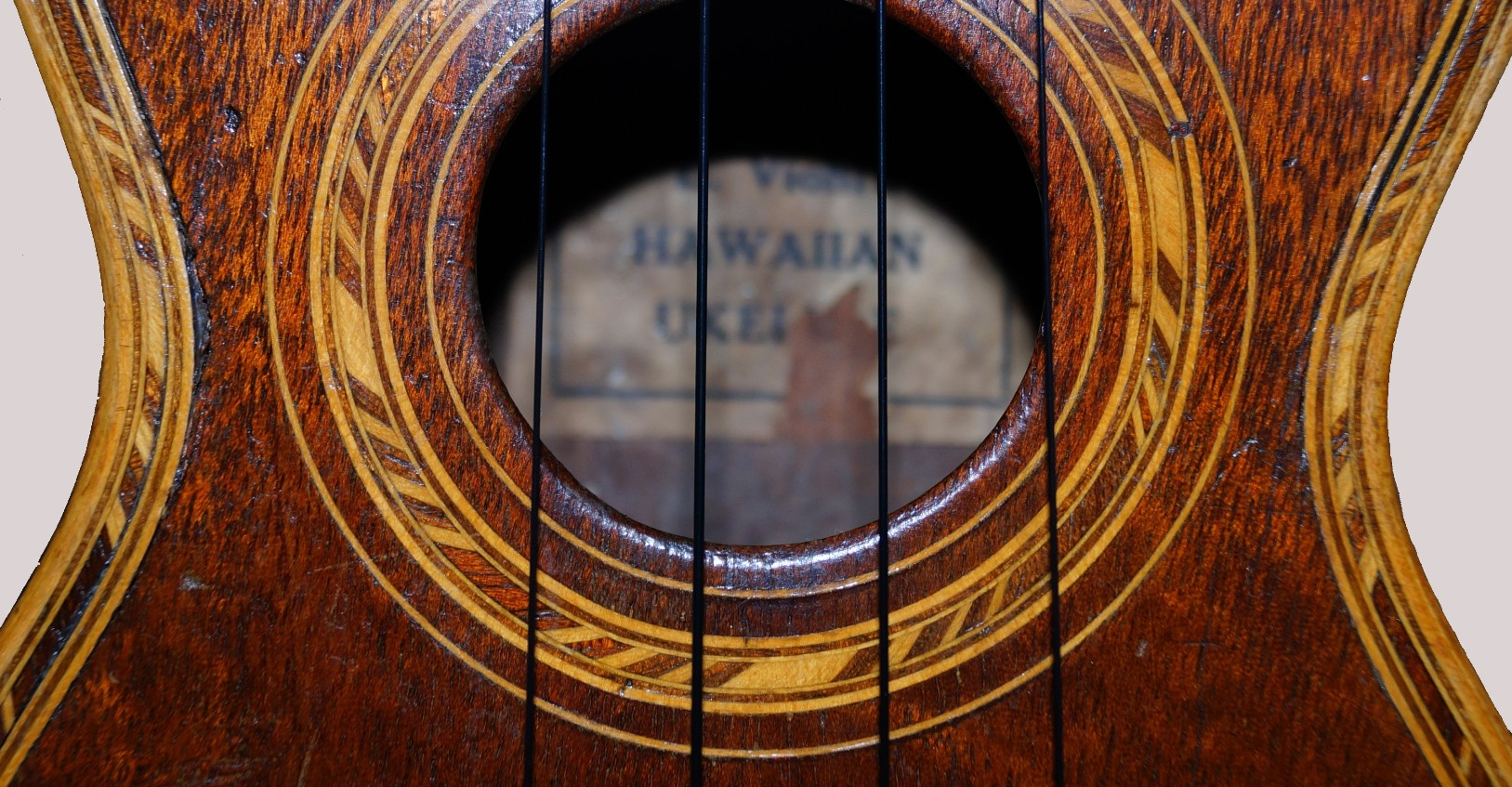
The soundhole and label of a ukulele made in the 1920s by Louis Viohl & Sons in Flushing, Queens, New York City.

==== The Ukulele Revival ====
The Ukulele Orchestra of Great Britain are widely thought to be behind the so called Ukulele Revival. Formed in 1985 by George Hinchliffe and Kitty Lux, this group began to prove that the ukulele could be more than just a toy, even performing intricate solos originally performed on guitar in addition to other unexpected tunes. From then and into the late 1990s, interest in the instrument reawakened. During the 1990s, new manufacturers began producing ukuleles and a new generation of musicians took up the instrument. Jim Beloff set out to promote the instrument in the early 1990s and created over two dozen ukulele music books featuring modern music and classic ukulele pieces.

All-time best-selling Hawaiian musician Israel Kamakawiwoʻole helped repopularize the instrument, in particular with his 1993 reggae-rhythmed medley of "Over the Rainbow" and "What a Wonderful World", used in films, television programs, and commercials. The song reached number 12 on Billboard's Hot Digital Tracks chart the week of January 31, 2004.

The creation of YouTube helped revive the popularity of the ukulele. One of the first videos to go viral was Jake Shimabukuro's ukulele rendition of George Harrison's "While My Guitar Gently Weeps". The video quickly went viral, and as of September 2020, had received over 17 million views.

In recent years, the ukulele has also been used increasingly in music education, sometimes replacing the recorder as first musical instrument. The ukulele is used both as a solo instrument and also in ensemble pieces for two or more instruments, such as Markus Rathey's song arrangements for three ukuleles.

== Construction ==
The ukulele is generally made of wood, though variants have been composed partially or entirely of plastic or other materials. Cheaper ukuleles are generally made from plywood or laminated woods, in some cases with a soundboard of a tonewood such as spruce. More expensive ukuleles are made of solid hardwoods such as mahogany. The traditionally preferred wood for ukuleles is a type of acacia endemic to Hawaii, called koa.

Typically, ukuleles have a figure-eight body shape similar to that of a small acoustic guitar. They are also often seen in nonstandard shapes, such as cutaway and oval, usually called a "pineapple" ukulele (see image below), invented by the Kamaka Ukulele company, or a boat-paddle shape, and occasionally a square shape, often made out of an old wooden cigar box.

These instruments usually have four strings; some strings may be paired in courses, giving the instrument a total of six or eight strings (primarily for greater strumming volume.) The strings themselves were originally made of catgut. Modern ukuleles use strings made from nylon polymers, synthetic gut, or fluorocarbon or wound strings composed of a (typically) nylon core wound with metal or polymers, including aluminium and silver-plated copper.

Instruments with six or eight strings in four courses are often called taropatches, or taropatch ukuleles. They were once common in the concert size, but now the tenor size is more common for six-string taropatch ukuleles. The six-string, four-course version, has two single and two double courses, and is sometimes called a lili'u, though this name also applies to the eight-string version. Eight-string baritone taropatches exist, and 5-string tenors have also been made.

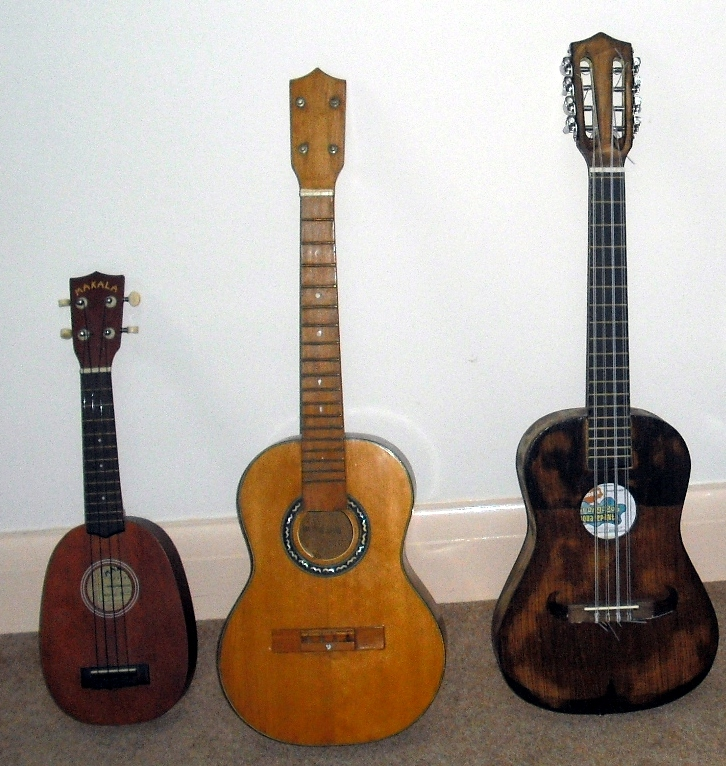
Soprano pineapple ukulele (left), baritone ukulele (center) and taropatch baritone ukulele (right)

== Size and range ==
Common types of ukuleles include soprano (standard ukulele), concert, tenor, and baritone. Less common are the sopranino (also called piccolo, bambino, or "pocket uke"), bass, and contrabass ukuleles. Other types of ukuleles include banjo ukuleles and electric ukuleles. Of the standard ukuleles, the soprano, often called "standard" in Hawaii, is the second smallest and was the original size. The concert size was developed in the 1920s as an enhanced soprano, slightly larger and louder with a deeper tone. Shortly thereafter, the tenor was created, having more volume and a deeper bass tone. The baritone (resembling a smaller tenor guitar) was created in the 1940s, and the contrabass and bass are recent innovations (2010 and 2014, respectively).

Size and popular tunings of standard ukulele types
Type	Alternate names	Typical length	Scale length	Frets	Range	Common tuning	Alternate tunings
Pocket	piccolo, sopranino, sopranissimo	16 in (41 cm)	11 in (28 cm)	10–12	G_{4}–D_{6} (E^{6})	D_{5} G_{4} B_{4} E_{5}	C_{5} F_{4} A_{4} D_{5}
Soprano	standard, ukulele	21 in (53 cm)	13 in (33 cm)	12–15	C_{4}–A_{5} (C^{6})	G_{4} C_{4} E_{4} A_{4}	A_{4} D_{4} F^{♯}_{4} B_{4} G_{3} C_{4} E_{4} A_{4}
Concert	alto	23 in (58 cm)	15 in (38 cm)	15–18	C_{4}–C_{6} (D^{♯ 6})	G_{4} C_{4} E_{4} A_{4}	G_{3} C_{4} E_{4} A_{4}
Tenor	taro patch, Liliu	26 in (66 cm)	17 in (43 cm)	17–19	G_{3}–D_{6} (E^{6})	G_{4} C_{4} E_{4} A_{4} ("High G"); G_{3} C_{4} E_{4} A_{4} ("Low G")	D_{4} G_{3} B_{3} E_{4} A_{3} D_{4} F^{♯}_{4} B_{4} D_{3} G_{3} B_{3} E_{4}
Baritone	bari, bari uke, taropatch	29 in (74 cm)	19 in (48 cm)	18–21	D_{3}–A^{♯}_{5} (C^{♯ 6})	D_{3} G_{3} B_{3} E_{4}("Guitar tuning")	C_{3} G_{3} B_{3} E_{4}
Bass		30 in (76 cm)	20 in (51 cm)	16–18	E_{2}–B_{4} (C^{♯5})	E_{2} A_{2} D_{3} G_{3}	
Contrabass	U-Bass, Rumbler	32 in (81 cm)	21 in (53 cm)	16	E_{1}–B_{3}	E_{1} A_{1} D_{2} G_{2}	D_{1} A_{1} D_{2} G_{2} ("Drop D")

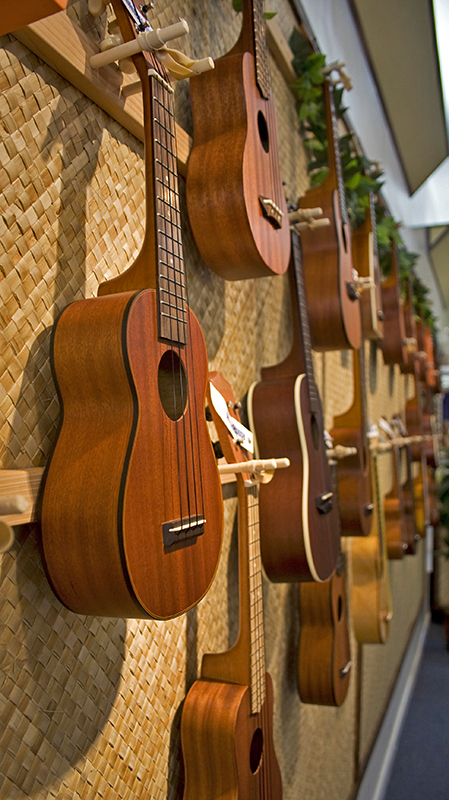
Several ukuleles in a music store

The following chart shows the range of notes of standard ukulele types. Note that the range varies with the tuning and size of the instruments. The examples shown in the chart reflect the range of each instrument from the lowest standard tuning to the highest fret in the highest standard tuning.

== Tuning ==
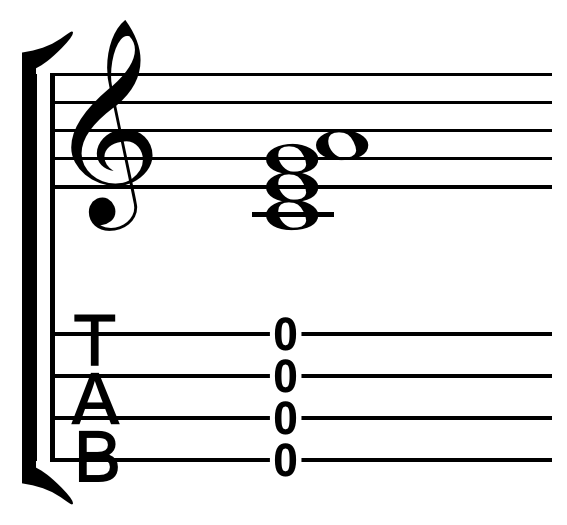
Ukulele C^{6} tuning.

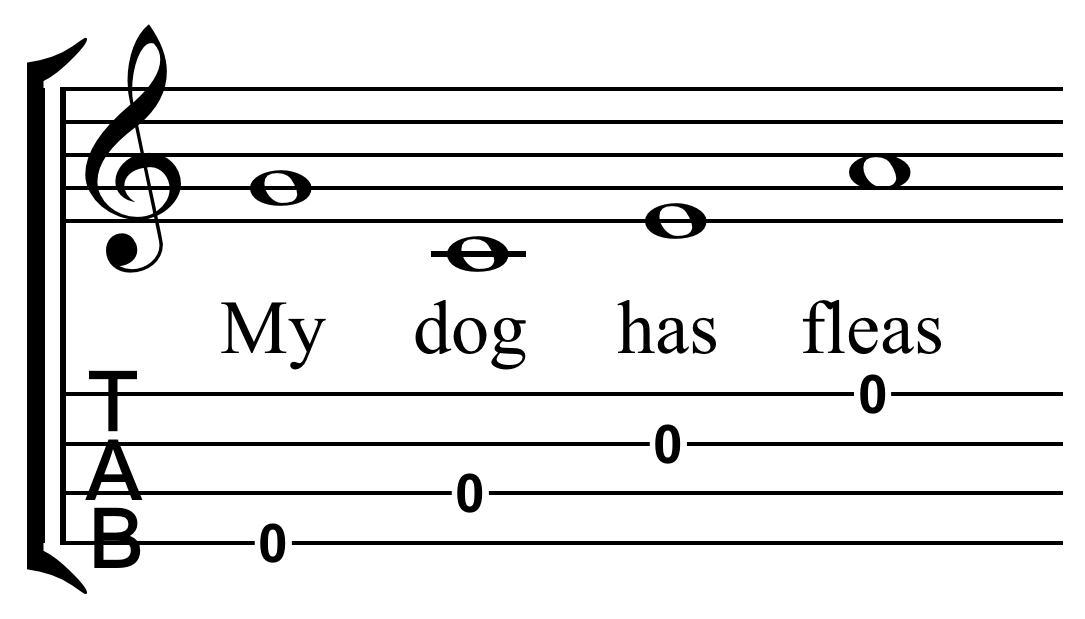
Tuning with the "my dog has fleas" mnemonic.

Chart of common soprano ukulele chords.

One of the most common tunings for the standard or soprano ukulele is C^{6} tuning: G_{4}–C_{4}–E_{4}–A_{4}, which is often remembered by the notes in the "My dog has fleas" jingle (see sidebar). The G string is tuned an octave higher than might be expected, so this is often called "high G" tuning. This is known as a "reentrant tuning"; it enables uniquely close-harmony chording.

More rarely used with the soprano ukulele (but more common on larger sizes) is C^{6} linear tuning, or "low G" tuning, which has the G in sequence an octave lower: G_{3}–C_{4}–E_{4}–A_{4}, which is equivalent to playing the top four strings (DGBE) of a guitar with a capo on the fifth fret.

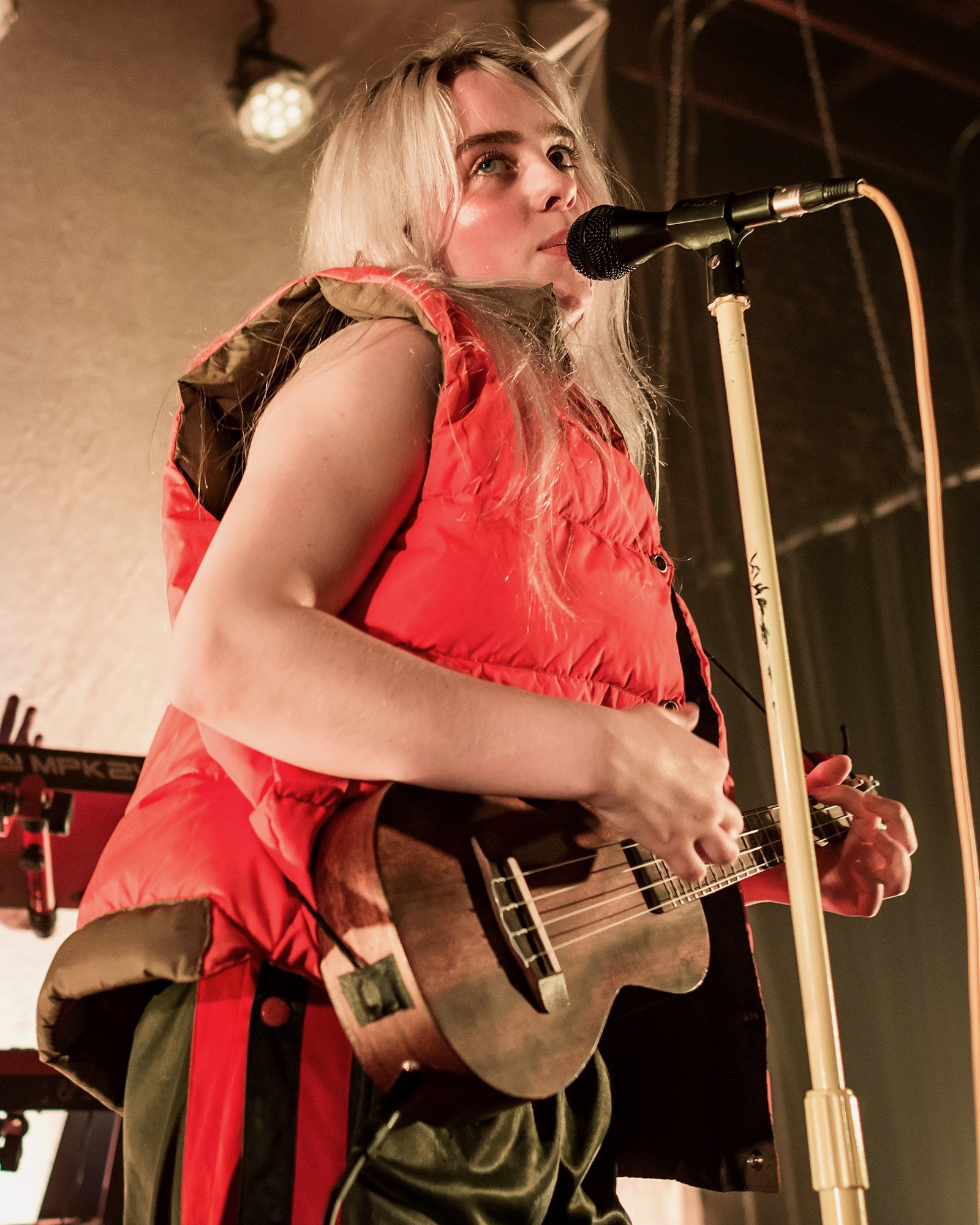
American singer Billie Eilish wrote her first song on a ukulele

Another common tuning for the soprano ukulele is the higher string-tension D^{6} tuning (or simply D tuning), A_{4}–D_{4}–F♯_{4}–B_{4}, one step higher than the G_{4}–C_{4}–E_{4}–A_{4} tuning. Once considered standard, this tuning was commonly used during the Hawaiian music boom of the early 20th century, and is often seen in sheet music from this period, as well as in many method books through the 1980s. D^{6} tuning is said by some to bring out a sweeter tone in some ukuleles, generally smaller ones. D^{6} tuning with a low fourth string, A_{3}–D_{4}–F♯_{4}–B_{4}, is sometimes called "Canadian tuning" after its use in the Canadian school system, mostly on concert or tenor ukuleles, and extensive use by James Hill and J. Chalmers Doane.

Whether C^{6} or D^{6} tuning should be the "standard" tuning is a matter of long and ongoing debate. There are historic and popular ukulele methods that have used each.

For the concert and tenor ukuleles, both reentrant and linear C^{6} tunings are standard; linear tuning in particular is widely used for the tenor ukulele, more so than for the soprano and concert instruments.

The baritone ukulele usually uses linear G^{6} tuning: D_{3}–G_{3}–B_{3}–E_{4}, the same as the highest four strings of a standard 6-string guitar.

Bass ukuleles are tuned similarly to the bass guitar and double bass: E_{1}–A_{1}–D_{2}–G_{2} for U-Bass style instruments (sometimes called contrabass), or an octave higher, E_{2}–A_{2}–D_{3}–G_{3}, for Ohana type metal-string basses.

Sopranino ukulele tuning is less standardized. They are usually tuned re-entrant, but frequently at a higher pitch than C; for example, re-entrant G^{6} tuning: D_{5}–G_{4}–B_{4}–E_{5}.

As is commonly the case with string instruments, other tunings may be preferred by individual players. For example, special string sets are available to tune the baritone ukulele in linear C^{6}. Some players tune ukuleles like other four-string instruments such as the mandolin, Venezuelan cuatro, or dotara. Ukuleles may also be tuned to open tunings, similar to the Hawaiian slack-key style.

== Related instruments ==
Ukulele varieties include hybrid instruments such as the guitalele (also called guitarlele), banjo ukulele (also called banjolele), harp ukulele, lap steel ukulele, and the ukelin. It is very common to find ukuleles mixed with other stringed instruments because of the number of strings and the easy playing ability. There is also an electrically amplified variant of the ukulele. The resonator ukulele produces sound by one or more spun aluminum cones (resonators) instead of the wooden soundboard, giving it a distinct and louder tone. The Tahitian ukulele, another variant, is usually carved from a single piece of wood, and does not have a hollow soundbox, although the back is open. The Tahitian ukulele generally has eight strings made from fishing line, tuned the same as a Hawaiian ukulele in four courses, although the middle two courses are an octave higher than its Hawaiian cousin. Inspired by the Tahitian ukulele, there is the Motu Nui variant, from France, which has just four strings made from fishing line and the hole in the back is designed to produce a wah-wah effect. Mario Maccaferri invented an automatic chording device for the ukulele, called Chord Master.

Close cousins of the ukulele include the Portuguese forerunners, the cavaquinho (also commonly known as machete or braguinha) and the slightly larger rajão. Other relatives include the Venezuelan cuatro, the Colombian and North American tiples, the timple of the Canary Islands, the Spanish vihuela, the Mexican requinto jarocho, and the Andean charango traditionally made of an armadillo shell. In Indonesia, a similar Portuguese-inspired instrument is the kroncong.

Uke Bass is close cousin to leona, a traditional bass instrument in son jarocho genre.

== Audio samples ==
"Hene", song by Henry Kailimai

G♯-minor chord

C major scale

Major scale performed on a bass ukulele with a felt plectrum (first) and fingers

Frequencies for tuning soprano ukulele

== See also ==
- List of ukulele players
- Stringed instrument tunings

== Bibliography ==
- Beloff, Jim (2003) [1997]. The Ukulele: A Visual History (Revised & Expanded ed.). San Francisco: Backbeat Books. ISBN 978-0-87930-758-5.
- Tranquada, Jim; King, John (2012). The Ukulele: A History. Honolulu, Hawaii: University of Hawaii Press. ISBN 978-0-8248-3634-4.
