= Texas (name) =

Name list

The name Texas is a unisex given name, a surname and a nickname.

== Given name ==
- Texas Battle (born 1980), American actor
- Texas Gladden (1895–1966) American folk singer

== Surname ==
- Alexis Texas (born 1985), American pornographic actress

== Nickname ==
- Alger Alexander (1900–1954), known as Texas Alexander, American blues singer
- Einar Ljungberg (1880-1974), also known as Texas Ljungberg, Swedish socialist politician
- John Horton Slaughter (1841–1922), also known as Texas John Slaughter, American Old West lawman, poker player, cowboy and rancher
- Texas Jack Vermillion (c. 1842–1911) American Old West gunfighter
- Texas Ruby (1908–1963) stage name of American country music vocalist Ruby Agnes Owens
- Texas Terri (born 1955), stage name of American punk rock singer and songwriter, Terri Laird
- T. Texas Tyler (1916–1972) stage name of American country music singer and songwriter David Luke Myrick

== See also ==
- Texas
- Texas (disambiguation)
- Texan (disambiguation)
- The Texan (disambiguation)
