= Msizi Africa =

Charity supporting children in Lesotho

- Founded: June 6, 2007; 19 years ago
- Founder: Lucy Elizabeth Caslon
- Type: UK registered charity
- Registration no.: 1119525
- Purpose: Msizi Africa gives children in Lesotho access to nutritious food.
- Location: 19 Kirkstall Road, London SW2 4HD, UK
- Coordinates: 51.442897°N 0.127915°W
- Region served: Lesotho
- Product: Nutrition, Health
- Key people: Trustees (UK volunteers): Lucy Herron (nee Caslon) (Founding Trustee), Christopher Roberts (Treasurer), Nick Wood, Daphne Kasambala, Jennifer Piper; Msizi Africa Lesotho: Mochesane Mosoloane (Country Director)
- Employees: 1
- Website: www.msiziafrica.org.uk
- Formerly called: Mants'ase Children's Home UK

Msizi Africa is an international charitable organisation set up by Lucy Caslon in 2007. Msizi means 'helper' in Zulu. The charity, based in South London and originally named Mants'ase Children's Home UK, is registered with the UK Charity commission and provides children in Lesotho with nutritious food. Msizi Africa actively supports and closely works with a number of local projects and collaborates with Letsema, a network of service providers working with orphans and vulnerable children in Lesotho. Since October 2015, Msizi Africa Lesotho has been registered as a Lesotho registered charitable organisation.

== History ==
Lucy Caslon first heard about Mants'ase Children's Home, an orphanage in Lesotho, in news reports of Prince Harry's visit to the home. At the end of an extensive trip through Africa in 2006 she decided to work at the orphanage as a volunteer. During this time she recognized that while the children in the home were fed, the food was not optimal in terms of nutrition and healthiness especially taking into consideration that many of the 50 children living in the home suffered from HIV/AIDS infection and other health issues. She received financial help from family and friends back in the UK which allowed her to buy fruit, vegetables, meat and fish to complement the children's normal diet of maize meals and cabbage. Realizing the positive effects of this healthier nutrition on the children's wellbeing Lucy Caslon founded the Mants'ase Children's Home UK charity after she arrived back in London. It was first set up specifically to benefit the lives of the children at the Mants'ase orphanage. Later the charity was re-branded as Msizi Africa as the support was extended to children in South Africa and Zambia.

Msizi Africa grew significantly after Lucy Caslon became one of eight winners of Vodafones 2008's World of Difference programme which allowed her to work full-time for her charity. Impressed by her success one of her corporate supporters decided to match Vodafone's scheme and continue to pay her salary for 2010 and 2011 enabling the charity in the following years to help to relieve the hardship of around thousand children in Africa, where the AIDS pandemic has left many without parents or an extended family. Besides providing food Msizi Africa also repairs the houses of children who live on their own to ensure safer living conditions for them.

In 2008, the Cape Town charity Beautiful Gate had to care for additional several hundred mothers with babies and young children due to the xenophobic attacks aimed towards foreign nationals living in South Africa which erupted in May and June of that year. Msizi Africa donated funds to feed these families for several days.

Msizi Africa has in the past also supported Umthombo, a non-profit organisation based in Durban, South Africa, by providing three meals a day for hundreds of homeless children in the city.

== Founder ==
Lucy Caslon attended the Christ's Hospital school from 1992 to 1999 and started organising fundraising events as a student. After graduating from Royal Holloway, University of London in 2003 with a BA in History she worked in the charity sector for three years, first in the events team at Marie Curie Cancer Care and eighteen months later as corporate fundraiser with Foundation for the Study of Infant Deaths.

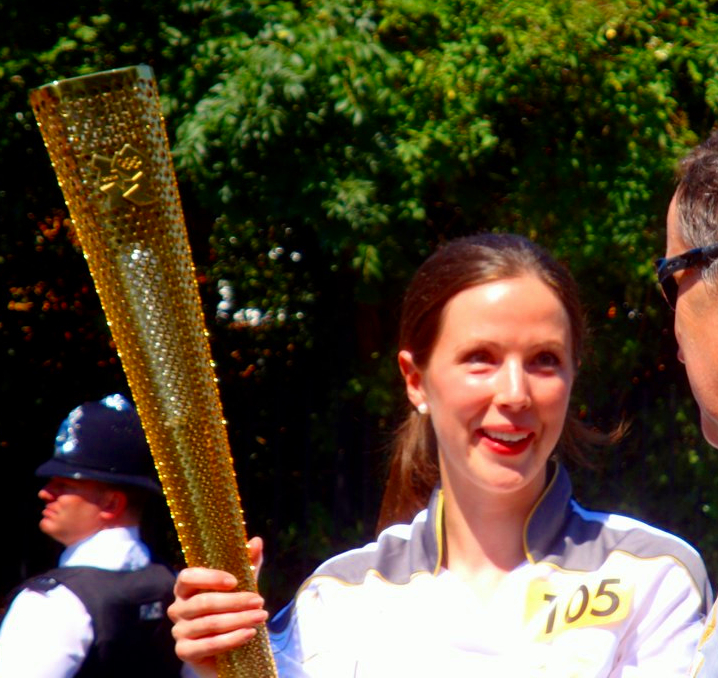
Lucy Caslon waiting to receive the Olympic flame (Photo: helejo)

In 2006, she spent three months traveling East, Central and Southern Africa before volunteering for four months, from August to December, at the Mants'ase Children's Home. After her return to London in 2007 she founded a charity in order to raise money to continue the food improvement project she had started during her time in Lesotho. She spend her evenings and weekends to raise funds while working full-time for eighteen months as Team Secretary EMEA Hospitality for DTZ.

Besides winning 2008 the World of Difference initiative of the Vodafone Foundation she was shortlisted for the Red and Cosmopolitan magazine 'Woman of the Year' awards in the same year. In 2011 Lucy Caslon was shortlisted for the Dods and Scottish Widows 'Women in Public Life Awards' in the category "Voluntary Sector Achiever of the Year".

Lucy Caslon shares her experiences to help other prospective founders by giving talks like for the Royal Holloway Entrepreneurs or as speaker at the Institute of Fundraising's National Convention 2012 and by writing articles. She has also published video tutorials about setting up a charity with the 'KnowHow NonProfit StudyZone', which is part of the National Council for Voluntary Organisations.

Caslon was selected to carry the Olympic Torch on 23 July 2012 in Sutton on Croydon Road (A232) from the junction with The Manor Way by the Wallington County Grammar School to the beginning of Acre Lane. In order to raise money for her charity she put her torch up for sale for an amount of £40000.00 which is needed to feed the 50 orphans of Mants'ase Children's Home for one year.

After serving as director at her charity from June 2007 to March 2013 Caslon returned to the Marie Curie Cancer Care organisation as Senior Corporate Account Manager but remains a trustee with Msizi Africa. In April 2015 she joined the London-based charity emerge poverty free where Caslon (now Herron) headed the fundraising department. From March to June 2016 she was Head of Development with Play for Change and then worked again part-time for Msizi Africa as secretary. Since its founding, she has always worked for the charity in many capacities, supported by a board of trustees.

Lucy Herron is since October 2016, together with her husband, also a director of the shoe manufacturing company Sloafer Limited.

=== UK Points of Life award ===
On 29 October 2019, Lucy Herron received from Prime Minister Boris Johnson the UK's 1276th Points of Light award for her work with Msizi Africa. In the award letter Johnson praised Herron for providing, through Msizi Africa, millions of meals to orphans and vulnerable children across Lesotho. On 23 October 2020 Herron published an open letter on the official Facebook account of the charity in which she returned the award after Boris Johnson voted in parliament against providing school meals to needy children during the holidays in autumn and winter 2020 inmidst the COVID-19 pandemic.

Mohale's Hoek district

== Present projects ==
=== Feeding programmes in Mohale's Hoek district ===
Msizi Africa concentrates its efforts to provide financial and logistic support to community based feeding programmes in villages in the Mohale's Hoek district of the Kingdom of Lesotho. In 2016 Msizi Africa Lesotho catered for 108 children in the villages Majapereng, Ha Mahase and Ha Thoriso but tries to raise money using the JustGiving crowd funding platform to expand their support to further villages as a survey of 2000 homes by the Msizi Africa Lesotho team revealed severe food shortage due to the drought in the country. In early 2018 the charity supported 96 orphans in those three villages and aimed to launch another feeding programme in a fourth village. On 6. June 2018 Msizi Africa announced that it has started to support a fourth village, Ha Lekhoaba, in its feeding programme. End of 2018 the feeding programme was extended to a fifth village, Ha Sekoati, bringing the number of orphans supported by the programme to over 200.

Msizi Africa also continues to support the children of the Mants'ase orphanage in Mohale's Hoek.

=== COVID-19 pandemic impact ===
During the 2020 COVID-19 pandemic, the charity has lost up to 80% of its income and the trustees announced that Msizi Africa has to reduce the number of villages supported by their feeding programme from five to three. The villages have been evaluated in order of their vulnerability taking into account the age of the children, the availability of food sources, prevalence of HIV and the presence of adult carers. The food programme in Majapareng has been stopped end of July 2020 and in Ha Mahase end of August 2020. The Irish harpist Aisling Ennis donated the proceeds of the final concert each month of her series of Harp O'Clock online concerts to Msizi Africa to help the charity during the pandemic.

=== Milk Project ===
In order to allow Msizi Africa Lesotho to become self-sufficient and able to raise the income for the feeding programmes within the country by 2023, a pilot project was started in June 2020 with two cows and loaned land. The Milk Project will produce milk from a small herd of Jersey cows, giving the milk to the supported children and selling the surplus to raise money to buy food. The project is run by Msizi Africa Lesotho with the initial support of the charity in London.

== Previously supported projects ==
=== Mophato oa Mants'ase Children's Home ===
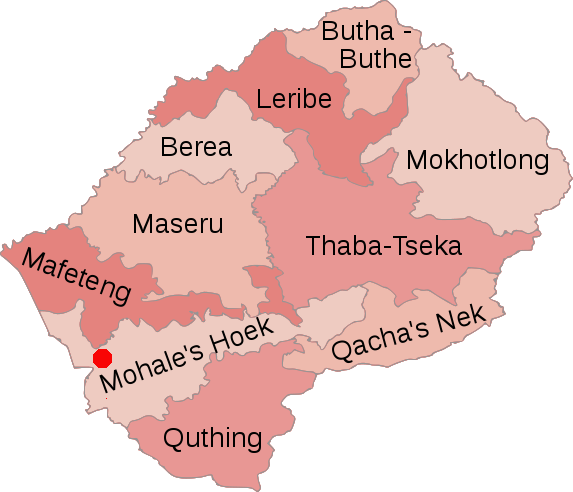
30°4′3.5″S 27°22′54.87″E

The Mants'ase Children's Home was started in 1979 as home for unwanted girls by Father Patrick M. Maekane, a retired Anglican priest and founder of the Mophato oa Mants'ase Society. After the initial buildings have been built by local women the first child was admitted in February 1980. The Home is located in Qhalasi in the Mohale's Hoek district of the Kingdom of Lesotho.

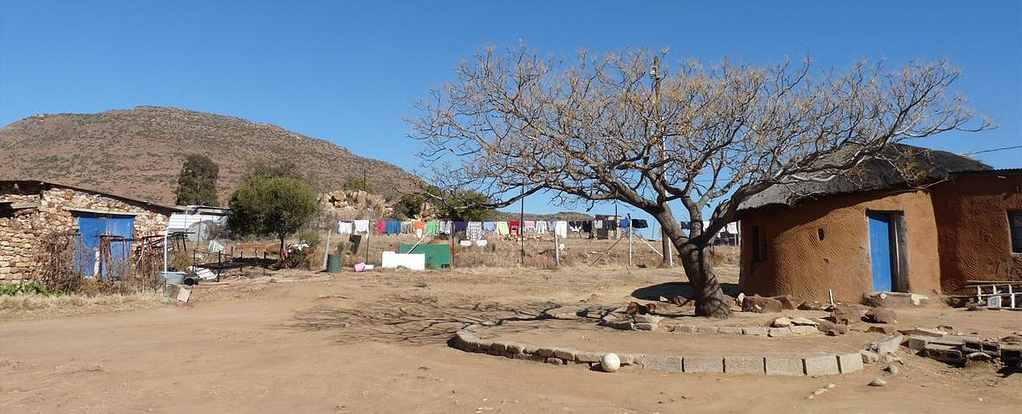
Rondavel which housed orphans at Mants'ase Children's Home before the new dormitory was built. (Photo: Greg Nusz)

The orphanage is the residential care facility of the Mophato oa Mants'ase Society whose patron is Queen 'Masenate Mohato Seeiso of Lesotho. It was one of the social projects visited by Prince Harry in 2004 during his first visit to the country. At a later visit in 2006 he launched there together with Prince Seeiso of Lesotho the Sentebale foundation which continues to assist the Society. Msizi Africa supports the children's home by providing financial help to buy food, build housing and pay for staff salary. The orphanes lived in round houses (rondavels), a typical type of building in that region, which were in a state of disrepair and Msizi Africa funded the building of a new dormitory complete with ablution blocks. Since 2014 the orphanage receives their food support from local organisations inside Lesotho.

Lucy Caslon was from 2010 until 2013 a member of the Board of Trustees of Mants'ase Children's Home and was its temporary manager for a short while in 2011.

=== iZulu Orphan Projects ===
In 2000, Chadd Bain returned to his native KwaZulu-Natal from the UK and started with two Zulu friends to educate and feed poor people in the rural area he had grown up in. He became involved with an orphanage called 'Nkosnathi' which he supported. In 2002 he met his later wife Kate and they started iZulu Orphan Projects (IOP), a non profit organisation which deals with orphans and widows affected by HIV and AIDS. From originally 80 orphans attending the 'Annual Orphan Christmas party', IOP supports now over 1600 children. After Chadd Bain's tragic death in a motorcycle accident in December 2009 the project was in danger of failing and Msizi Africa pledged to feed 250 of the children and became Kate Bains biggest supporter enabling her to continue with the charity. Lucy Caslon climbed Mount Kilimanjaro in September 2010 in order to raise money for that project.

=== Peace Matunda School and Orphanage ===
Msizi Africa helped to fund the feeding programme of the Peace Matunda project founded in 2005 by Unambwe Zephania Kaaya. It consists of an orphanage with 24 children and a school and Kindergarten with over 200 pupils located in the rainforest of Mount Meru in Northern Tanzania, about 15 km from the city of Arusha.

=== Testimony and Majapereng feeding programmes ===
Msizi Africa provided food to couples in villages surrounding the Mants'ase Children's Home who cook for local orphans and distribute food parcels. This project supports 160 children not only with food but also with school uniforms and medical care. The Testimony Feeding Programme (covering Ha Potsane, Qalakheng and Kubake) and the Majapereng Feeding Programme were located in nearby villages in the Mohale's Hoek district.

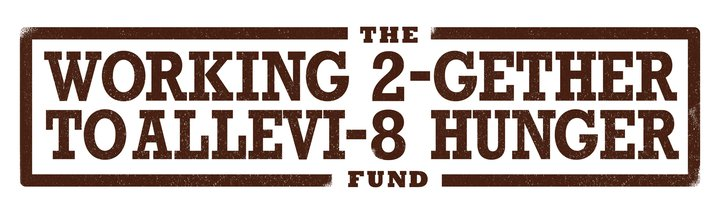

=== The 28 Fund ===
The 28 Fund was a campaign started by Msizi Africa in 2011 which aims to gain donation by direct debit accounts set up by supporters for 28 pence (or multiples of that amount) as it costs Msizi Africa 28 pence to feed one child for a day. The project was aimed at businesses as well as individuals.
