= Whisky Supper =

Live album by Wicked Tinkers
- Released: 2005
- Genre: Celtic

Wicked Tinkers chronology
Banger For Breakfast (2003)	Whisky Supper (2005)

Whisky Supper is the fifth album released by the Wicked Tinkers

== Musicians ==
- Aaron Shaw - Great Highland Bagpipe
- Warren Patrick Casey - Tapan, Bodhran
- Keith Jones - Snare, Djembe
- Jay Atwood - Didgeridoo, Irish Horn

== Special guest artists ==
- Tyler Spencer

Bronze Age Irish Horn in 'Bb': made by Simon O'Dwyer, Galway, Ireland
Didgeridoo in 'Bb': made by Lewis Burns, Queensland, Australia
Slide Didgeridoo: made by Tyler Spencer, Eugene, Oregon
Shakers

- Golden Bough

Margie Butler, vocal, whistle, bodhran
Paul Espinoza, vocals, mando cello & guitar
Kathy Sierra, violin

== Credits ==
Produced by: Thistle Pricks Productions

Recorded on location at various venues across America.

Mixed by: Scott Fraser at Architecture, Los Angeles, CA. Captured on an Apple Powerbook G3 computer and a FireLite 30 GB hard drive with Digital Performer 3.01, and two "Mark of the Unicorn" (MOTU) 828s. All really great products.

A very special thanks, yet again, to Scott Fraser for his (creative input) ideas and support with the engineering for "On Location Recording". He has been a great resource in the new world of digital recording.

Mastered by: Brian Gardner, Bernie Grundman Mastering, Hollywood, CA. Graphic Design & Production: Paul Manchester & Warren Casey Photography: Chris Keeney, San Diego, CA & Matt Mick

Copy Editing: Wendy Weisenberg & Aaron Shaw

== Track listing ==
1. Dream
2. Hey
3. Wicked Tinkers
4. 6/8 Marches
5. Fiollaigean
6. Glasses of Wine
7. Birds
8. Toasty
9. Aaron's Set
10. Farmer
11. Terror Time & Ferret
12. Wicked Bough
13. Drummers Jigs
14. Flower of Scotland & Black Bear
15. Weird Jigs
16. Radar
