= Tiki room =

Tiki room may refer to:

- Tiki bar
- Walt Disney's Enchanted Tiki Room at Disneyland and the Magic Kingdom
  - a Disney theme song: The Tiki Tiki Tiki Room
- a room filled with Tiki culture kitsch
- a room themed with Tiki elements

== See also ==
- Tiki (disambiguation)
