= Aaron Shaw (disambiguation) =

Aaron Shaw (1811–1887) was a U.S. representative from Illinois.

Aaron Shaw or Shore may also refer to:

- Aaron Shaw, American bagpipe player in the Wicked Tinkers
- Aaron Grady Shaw, actor sometimes credited as Aaron Shaw, in Dirty Laundry (2006 film)
- Aaron Shore, fictional character in Designated Survivor (TV series)
- Aaron Shaw, fictional character in NCIS (TV series) (Season 17, episode 7)

== See also ==
- Aaron Shure, TV writer
