= Tex =

Tex, TeX, TEX, may refer to:

== People and fictional characters ==
- Tex (nickname), a list of people and fictional characters with the nickname
- Tex Earnhardt (1930–2020), U.S. businessman
- Joe Tex (1933–1982), stage name of American soul singer Joseph Arrington Jr.
- Tex, the robot mascot for the American audio company THX

== Places ==
- Telluride Regional Airport (IATA airport code TEX), Telluride, San Miguel County, Colorado, USA
- Texas, USA; a subnational division, a state of the United States; which has the common abbreviation "Tex."
- Texarkana, Texas, USA; (LOCODE subnational code TEX)

== Arts and entertainment ==
- Tex (novel), a 1979 novel by S. E. Hinton
- Tex (film), a 1982 film based on S.E. Hinton's novel, starring Matt Dillon
- Tex, an Italian comic book series by Sergio Bonelli Editore

== Computing ==
- TeX, a typesetting system created by Donald Knuth and released in 1978
  - .tex, a file extension for TeX and LaTeX

== Groups, organizations ==
- Texas Rangers (baseball), a Major League Baseball team in the U.S.
- Tex Corp, Indian clothing fastener company

== Other uses ==
- TEX (explosive), an explosive chemical compound
- Tex (unit), a unit of measure for the linear mass density of fibers
- Nestlé Tex, a South African chocolate bar
- Enochian magic §§ The Thirty Æthyrs and TEX, the lowest spiritual plane or realm in the Renaissance Enochian magic system

== See also ==
- Big Tex, the icon of the annual State Fair of Texas
- Textainer Group Holdings, whose shipping containers are labeled "tex"
- Tekes (disambiguation)
- Tex-Mex (disambiguation)
- Texas (disambiguation)
