= Tiki (name) =

Tiki is a unisex given name. It is also used as a surname. People with the name include:

== Male ==
- Tiki Barber (born 1975), American football player
- Tiki Fulwood (1944–1979), American musician
- Tiki Ghosn (born 1977), American professional mixed martial artist
- Tiki Lafe (born 1953), Malaysian politician
- Tiki Nxumalo (1950–2015), South African actor
- Tiki Taane (born 1976), New Zealand Maori musician

== Female ==
- Tiki Gelana (born 1987), Ethiopian marathon runner
- Tiki Tsang (born 1968), Australian former actress

== Stage name ==
- Tiki King, stage name of Patrick Baron (born 1963), American artist and musician

== Surname ==
- Sabarmatee Tiki (born c. 1969), Indian conservationist and farmer

== See also ==
- Tiki, disambiguation page
