= Teke =

Teke or Tekke can refer to:

== People ==
- Teke (tribe), a tribe of southern Turkmenistan
- Teke people or Bateke, a Central African ethnic group
- Tekke Panman (born 1968), Dutch politician
- Fatih Tekke (born 1977), Turkish footballer
- Kent Tekulve (born 1947), American baseball player

== Places ==
- Tekke of Frashër, a Bektashi shrine and Cultural Monument of Albania in Gjirokastër County
- Tekke of Martanesh, a Cultural Monument of Albania in Dibër County
- Tekke of Melan, a khanqah in Libohovë, Albania
- Teke (lake), Kazakhstan
- Teke, Lesotho
- Tekke, Kazan, Ankara Province, Turkey
- Tekke, Sarayköy, Denizli Province, Turkey
- Teke Peninsula, in Antalya Province, Turkey
- Beylik of Teke, a frontier principality established by Oghuz Turkish clans
- Mount Teke, the highest peak in İskilip, Turkey
- Teaca (Hungarian: Teke), a commune in Bistriţa-Năsăud County, Romania
- Tekke, a neighborhood of Görmeli, Turkey
- Takya (or Tekke in Turkish), which may refer to the gathering place of a Sufi brotherhood, or the shrine of a Sufi saint
- Takyeh, a place where Iranian Shiites gather for mourning of Muharram

== Religion ==
- Takya (or Tekke in Turkish), which may refer to the gathering place of a Sufi brotherhood, or the shrine of a Sufi saint
- Takyeh, a place where Iranian Shiites gather for mourning of Muharram

== Other uses ==
- Teke languages, a series of Bantu languages spoken by the Teke people
- Teke Teke, a Japanese urban legend
- Akhal-Teke, a horse breed associated with the tribe
- Tau Kappa Epsilon fraternity, one of its members, or its quarterly publication THE TEKE
- Telekinesis, as in George R.R. Martin's novella Nightflyers
- Central Special Branch, a defunct Chinese intelligence agency

== See also ==
- Teak, a tropical hardwood tree species
- Tekes (disambiguation)
- Tiki (disambiguation)
