= Texas (disambiguation) =

Texas is a U.S state.

Texas may also refer to:

== Places ==
=== United States ===
- Republic of Texas, a 1836–1846 sovereign nation in North America
  - First Republic of Texas, or the Green Flag Republic
  - Second Republic of Texas, or the Long Republic
- Texas, Alabama, an unincorporated community
- Texas, Georgia, an unincorporated community
- Texas, Kentucky, an unincorporated community
- Texas, Mississippi, an unincorporated community
- Texas, New Jersey, an unincorporated community
- Texas, New York, a hamlet
- Texas, Ohio, an unincorporated community
- Texas, West Virginia, an unincorporated community
- Texas, Wisconsin, a town
- Texas City, Illinois, an unincorporated community
- Texas City, Texas, a municipality
- Texas County (disambiguation)
- Texas Township (disambiguation)
- Texas Canyon, a canyon in Cochise County, Arizona
- Texas District, a district of the Lutheran Church
- Texas Valley, a valley in Georgia
- Texas Avenue, a section of Texas State Highway 6 in the College Station-Bryan metropolitan area

=== Elsewhere ===
- 35352 Texas, an asteroid
- Texas, a refugee camp and now permanent settlement in Calbuco, Chile
- Texas, Queensland, a town in Australia
- Texas Downs, a cattle station in Western Australia

== Arts and entertainment ==
- Texas (novel), by James A. Michener

=== Film and television ===
- Texas (2005 film), an Italian movie
- Texas (1941 film), a Western starring William Holden and Glenn Ford
- "Texas" (SpongeBob SquarePants), episode 18 (2000) of the animated TV series
- James A. Michener's Texas, a 1994 TV movie based on the eponymous novel; starring Benjamin Bratt, Patrick Duffy
- Texas (TV series), a 1980s American television program
- Texas John Slaughter (TV series), based on Texas John Slaughter (John Horton Slaughter)

== Military ==
- USS Texas, the name of a number of ships of the United States Navy
- CSS Texas, a twin-screw ironclad ram of the Confederate Navy

== Music ==
- Texas (band), a Scottish rock band
- Texas (musical), produced annually in Canyon, Texas, US
- Texas (PlayRadioPlay! album), 2008
- Texas (Lasse Stefanz album), 2010
- "Texas (When I Die)", 1977, Ed Bruce
- "Texas" (Chris Rea song), 1990
- "Texas" (BigXthaPlug song), 2022
- Texas (Jessie Murph song), 2023
- "Texas" (Blake Shelton song), 2024
- "Texas", a 1975 song by Charlie Daniels from the album Nightrider
- "Texas", a 1983 song by Big Black from the EP Bulldozer
- "Texas", a 1990 song by The Highwaymen from Highwayman 2
- "Texas", a 2000 song by Allan Holdsworth from The Sixteen Men of Tain
- "Texas, Qld 4385", a 2002 song by Lee Kernaghan from Electric Rodeo
- "Texas", a 2005 song by George Strait from Somewhere Down in Texas
- "Texas", a 2024 single by Keshi

== Transportation ==
- The Texas (locomotive), a steam locomotive involved in the American Civil War Great Locomotive Chase
- 2-10-4 or Texas-type, a class of locomotive
- Texas (steamboat), a structure or section of a steamboat or ship

== People ==
- Hasinai, Tejas or Texas, a Native American people after whom the state was named
- Alger "Texas" Alexander (1900–1954), American blues singer
- Einar "Texas" Ljungberg (1880–1974), Swedish socialist leader
- John Horton Slaughter (Texas John Slaughter, 1841–1922), American Old West lawman, poker player, cowboy and rancher
- Texas Jack Vermillion (1842–1911), American Old West gunfighter
- Texas Battle (born 1980), American actor
- Texas Gladden (1895–1967), American folk singer
- Texas Ruby, stage name of pioneering country music female vocalist Ruby Agnes Owens (1908–1963)
- Texas Terri, punk rock singer and songwriter born Terri Laird in 1955
- T. Texas Tyler, stage name of American country music singer and songwriter David Luke Myrick (1916–1972)
- Alexis Texas (born 1985), American pornographic actress

== Other uses ==
- University of Texas at Austin, a research university
- Texas Homecare, a former chain of DIY stores in the UK

== See also ==
- Tex (disambiguation)
- Texa, an island of the Inner Hebrides, Scotland
- Texan (disambiguation)
