= Texas Township =

Texas Township may refer to the following places in the United States:

- Texas Township, Lee County, Arkansas, in Lee County, Arkansas
- Texas Township, Craighead County, Arkansas, in Craighead County, Arkansas
- Texas Township, DeWitt County, Illinois
- Texas Township, Kalamazoo County, Michigan
- Texas Township, Dent County, Missouri
- Texas Township, Crawford County, Ohio
- Texas Township, Cotton County, Oklahoma
- Texas Township, Washita County, Oklahoma
- Texas Township, Pennsylvania

== See also ==
- Texas (disambiguation)
