= Tiki (disambiguation) =

Tiki is the first man in Māori mythology or a humanoid carving in Central Eastern Polynesian culture generally.

Tiki may also refer to:

== People ==
- Tiki (name), list of people with the name

== Computing ==
- Tiki Data, a Norwegian computer company
  - Tiki 100, a desktop home/personal computer
- Tiki Wiki CMS Groupware

== Arts and entertainment ==
- Tiki (album), a 2005 album by Richard Bona
- Tiki, the protagonist from Japanese arcade game The New Zealand Story
- Tiki III, the schooner in the American television series Adventures in Paradise
- Tiki, a divine dragon character in the Fire Emblem video game series
- Tiki (Symphogear), a character in the anime series Symphogear

== Other uses ==
- Hei-tiki, a type of Māori neck pendant
- Tiki (gecko), a reptile commonly found clinging to walls in the Philippines
- Tiki culture, a decoration style for bars, restaurants and clubs loosely based on Polynesian motifs
  - Tiki bar
- Tiki Formation, a Mesozoic geologic formation
- Brockville Tikis, a Canadian junior ice hockey team
- Tiki, a kit car

== See also ==
- "El Tiki", a 2015 song by Colombian reggaeton artist Maluma
- Teke (disambiguation)
- Tiky, a soft drink in Guatemala
- Harper's Bizarre, American pop band originally called The Tikis
