= Siloe, Lesotho =

Siloe
- Community Council
- Geographic Center of Community
- Coordinates: 29°59′01″S 27°16′45″E
- Country: Lesotho
- District: Mohale's Hoek District
- Elevation: 5,984 ft (1,824 m)

Population (2006)
  - Total: 18,261
- Time zone: UTC+2 (CAT)
- Coordinates computed from Lesotho Villages file.

Siloe is a community council located in the Mohale's Hoek District of Lesotho. Its population in 2006 was 18,261.

== Villages ==
The community of Siloe includes the villages of Fifteen Miles (Khateane) Ha 'Malintja, Ha Chabeli, Ha Hamo, Ha HlapaneHa Kamela, Ha Kekeleng, Ha Khamolane, Ha Khorola, Ha Koloti, Ha Lebele, Ha Loui, Ha Mahlatsi, Ha Mahlehle, Ha Mahoete, Ha Majoale, Ha Maleka, Ha Maseli, Ha Masunhloane, Ha Matoko, Ha Matsie, Ha Matsipa, Ha Moeketsi, Ha Mohapeloa, Ha Mohohlo, Ha Mokhati, Ha Mokhothu, Ha Moko, Ha Mokoroane, Ha Mokotane, Ha Molatoli, Ha Moletsane, Ha Montšo, Ha Monyake, Ha Mpopo, Ha Ntilane, Ha Pii, Ha Pitsi, Ha Popolosi, Ha Raboko, Ha Raboko (Sefateng), Ha Rajane, Ha Rakulubane, Ha Rakulubane (Matebeleng), Ha Raleaooa, Ha Ralikhalile, Ha Ramabele, Taung Ha Ramathe, Ha Ramokausu, Ha Ramokhele, Ha Ramonate, Ha Ramootsi, Ha Ramotsoanyane, Ha Rantsie, Ha Raphuthing, Ha Raselepe, Ha Rathamae, Ha Raubi, Ha Salemone, Ha Seabo, Ha Sephapo, Ha Serabele, Ha Thulo, Ha Tiheli, Ha Tsienyane, Khateane, Khuthumala (Letlapeng), Lefikeng (Ha Mokhele), Lehloaneng, Lekhalong, Leribe, Letsatseng, Linareng, Liphookoaneng, Lithotseleng, Majakaneng, Malimong, Maralleng (Ha Tjama), Matšoareng, Moreneng, Mosehlane, Motse-Mocha, Ntširele, Pontšeng, Qalike, Salang, Sekhutloaneng, Setasi, Siloe (Ha Thulo), Sokase, Takalatsa, Thabaneng (Ha Pii), Thabeng, Theella, Thotaneng, Thoteng, Tlokotsing (Ha Mokhethi), Tlokotsing (Moreneng), Tlokotsing (Thabaneng) and Tsoloane.
