= Mootsinyane =

- Community Council
- Geographic Center of Community
- Coordinates: 30°16′05″S 27°40′52″E
- Country: Lesotho
- District: Mohale's Hoek District
- Elevation: 5,722 ft (1,744 m)

Population (2006)
  - Total: 9,995
- Time zone: UTC+2 (CAT)
- Coordinates computed from Lesotho Villages file.

Mootsinyane is a community council located in the Mohale's Hoek District of Lesotho. Its population in 2006 was 9,995.

== Villages ==
The community of Mootsinyane includes the villages of

- Anone
- Baletsi
- Bompolasi
- Borakapane
- Boritsa
- Fika-la-Tšoene
- Ha 'Mamaqabe
- Ha Beka
- Ha Khoai
- Ha Lebele
- Ha Leketa
- Ha Lekhafola
- Ha Lengau
- Ha Make
- Ha Makhalanyane
- Ha Makoae (Tlaling)
- Ha Malephane
- Ha Matoli
- Ha Mocheko
- Ha Moena (Ha Lesibo)
- Ha Moena (Ha Monyefoli)
- Ha Moena (Moreneng)
- Ha Mohapi
- Ha Mohlomi
- Ha Mokhoele
- Ha Mokoto
- Ha Molibeli
- Ha Mothiba
- Ha Nkieane
- Ha Ntee
- Ha Pholo
- Ha Pita (Mokh'opha)
- Ha Raisa
- Ha Ralikhomo
- Ha Ramokhongoana
- Ha Ramonethi
- Ha Ramothobi (Ha Lekholoa)
- Ha Ramothobi (Ha Lekhotso)
- Ha Ramothobi (Moreneng)
- Ha Raqoatha
- Ha Sebothama
- Ha Seliane
- Ha Sentšo
- Ha Sethunya
- Ha Setulo
- Ha Shalane
- Ha Thabo
- Ha Tsela (Manyareleng)
- Ha Tsela (Mokh'opha)
- Ha Tsietsi
- Khohlong
- Khokhotsaneng
- Lekhalong
- Letlapeng
- Liqaleng
- Lithipeng
- Litšoeneng
- Makilanyaneng
- Marakong
- Matlapaneng
- Matolong
- Matsakaneng
- Matsatsaneng
- Mohlakaneng
- Mohloareng
- Motse-Mocha
- Motse-Mocha (Tlaling)
- Phoseng
- Phuthing
- Qeneng
- Sebataolong
- Sekhutloaneng
- Sekoaing
- Shalane
- Taung (Tlaling)
- Thaba-Bosiu
- Tlaling (Manganeng)
- Tlaling (Thabaneng)
- Tlokoeng
- Tsekong and Tšieng
