= Khoelenya =

- Community Council
- Geographic Center of Community
- Coordinates: 30°17′39″S 27°29′28″E
- Country: Lesotho
- District: Mohale's Hoek District
- Elevation: 5,558 ft (1,694 m)

Population (2006)
  - Total: 22,424
- Time zone: UTC+2 (CAT)
- Coordinates computed from Lesotho Villages file.

Khoelenya is a community council located in the Mohale's Hoek District of Lesotho. Its population in 2006 was 22,424.

== Villages ==
The 180-odd villages that the community of Khoelenya includes are:

Bolometsa
Braakfontein
Ha 'Mamajoro
Ha Bereng Matsoho
Ha Bereng Matsoho (Bohareng)
Ha Bereng Matsoho (Bohareng)
Ha Bereng Matsoho (Ha Tanausi)
Ha Bereng Matsoho (Letlapeng)
Ha Bereng Matsoho (Mantjelebeng)
Ha Bereng Matsoho (Soaeng)
Ha Fako
Ha Forosemethe
Ha Jobo
Ha K'heisara
Ha Kalele
Ha Kibe
Ha Laesetoko
Ha Mahase
Ha Makhabane
Ha Makhaola
Ha Makhisa
Ha Makhube
Ha Makoanyane
Ha Makoetlane
Ha Makoili
Ha Malatsa
Ha Mane
Ha Maphoma
Ha Matlhakeli
Ha Mohlakana
Ha Moiloa
Ha Mokotso
Ha Mor'a-Thaba
Ha Morabe

Ha Morie
Ha Moshe
Ha Motee
Ha Mothebesoane
Ha Motloheloa
Ha Motobeki
Ha Nchocho
Ha Nkau
Ha Nkau (Lithakong)
Ha Nkhetheleng
Ha Nkhoroane
Ha Ntabanyane
Ha Nthama
Ha Peli
Ha Putsoa
Ha Qoane
Ha Rabele
Ha Rabele (Moselinyane)
Ha Rakoloi
Ha Ramatlalla
Ha Ramokase
Ha Ramololi
Ha Rankali
Ha Rashaba
Ha Robita
Ha Sekatle
Ha Seliba
Ha Sello
Ha Setotoma
Ha Souru
Ha Tale
Ha Telite
Ha Thabane (Ha Tšehla)
Ha Thetso

Ha Tomase
Ha Tšehla
Ha Tšenoli
Khohloaneng
Khohlong
Khohlong (Ha Sethunya)
Khorong
Khothometsane
Lekhalong
Lekhalong (Ha Litaba)
Lekhoareng
Libataolong
Likoaeng
Maiseng
Majakaneng
Majoe-Masoeu
Makhaleng
Manyareleng
Maphutsaneng
Maphutsaneng (Aupolasi)
Marabeng
Marabeng (Bluegum)
Marabeng (Ha Michael)
Marabeng (Lekhalong)
Masunyaneng
Matebeleng
Matlaleng
Matlapaneng
Matlapaneng (Ha Makoili)
Matlapaneng (Lihaboreng)
Matlapaneng (Litenteng)
Meriting
Metsi-Masooana
Moeaneng

Mohloka-Kobo
Morifi (Ha Khosi)
Morifi (Ha Mokhoenyana)
Moselinyane
Motse-Mocha
Motse-Mocha (Ha Soko)
Mpharane
Ngopeng-la-Ntja
Phatlalla
Phuthing
Phuthing (Thibella)
Polateng
Poqa
Qhalasing
Qoqotho (Mafikalisiu)
Risefeng
Seabela
Sebetlaneng
Sebetleng
Setanteng
Sethaleng
Taung
Thabana-Bosulu
Thabana-Tšooana
Thabaneng
Thota-Moli
Thotaneng
Tolobanka
Tsanana (Ha Rabotsetse)
Tsekong
Tsoapo-le-bolila
Tsoating
Waterfall
White City
