= Tex-Mex (disambiguation) =

Tex-Mex is a regional American cuisine that blends food products available in the United States and the culinary creations of Mexican-Americans influenced by the cuisines of Mexico.

Tex-Mex or TexMex may also refer to:

- Tejanos, a name for residents of the state of Texas culturally descended from the settlers of Texas and northern Mexico
  - Tex-Mex music, another name for Tejano music, folk and popular music originating among the Mexican-American populations of Central and Southern Texas
- Texas Mexican Railway, often referred to as the "Tex-Mex Railway"
- Spanglish, a language blending formed of Spanish and English that is called "Tex-Mex" by some Texans
- Tex-Mex (album), an album by Freddy Fender
- XHPACP-FM (97.1 MHz; Radio TexMex), Acatlán de Osorio, Puebla, Mexico

== See also ==
- Mex-Mex
- Tex (disambiguation)
- Mex (disambiguation)
