= Likhutloaneng =

- Community Council
- Geographic Center of Community
- Coordinates: 29°58′36″S 28°08′19″E
- Country: Lesotho
- District: Mohale's Hoek District
- Elevation: 7,431 ft (2,265 m)

Population (2006)
  - Total: 7,937
- Time zone: UTC+2 (CAT)
- Coordinates computed from Lesotho Villages file.

Likhutloaneng is a community council located in the Mohale's Hoek District of Lesotho. Its population in 2006 was 7,937.

== Villages ==
The community of Likhutloaneng includes the villages of:

- Boluka-Hlapi
- Ha 'Malane
- Ha 'Matholoana
- Ha Elia
- Ha Isao
- Ha Khajoane
- Ha Khosi
- Ha Kou
- Ha Lepekola
- Ha Leronti
- Ha Lesuoa
- Ha Lethola
- Ha Luka
- Ha Mahlokolo
- Ha Makepe
- Ha Malefane
- Ha Malefetsane
- Ha Mapaloe
- Ha Marathane
- Ha Maritinyane

- Ha Masilo
- Ha Mathibane
- Ha Matitimisa
- Ha Moeketsi
- Ha Mofolane
- Ha Mokukutoana
- Ha Motšoane
- Ha Mpheulane
- Ha Ngoan'a-Ntloana
- Ha Nkesi
- Ha Nkonyana
- Ha Notši
- Ha Ntaoana
- Ha Ntja
- Ha Ntšokolo
- Ha Posholi
- Ha Ralemati
- Ha Ramafole / Ha Ntoana
- Ha Ramokhele

- Ha Seferi
- Ha Sekoli
- Ha Selalome
- Ha Sello
- Ha Senyeka
- Ha Setene
- Ha Setsoto
- Ha Titimise (Moreneng)
- Ha Titimise (Sekhutlong)
- Ha Tota
- Ha Tsie
- Heising
- Koung
- Lekhalong
- Letsatseng
- Letsoapong (Ha Maleli)
- Letsoapong (Ha Moiketsi)
- Likhutloaneng
- Likoepereng

- Liphamoleng
- Lithakong
- Litooaneng
- Makhalong
- Makheka
- Maluke
- Manganeng
- Masaleng
- Meeling
- Mokopung
- Qapane
- Ramafole
- Sefateng
- Sekhutlong
- Thaba-Ntšo (Ha Tumo)
- Topa (Ha Nkuebe)
- Topa (Likhutloaneng)
- Topa (Makhalong)
- Tšenekeng
