= Tex (nickname) =

Name list

Tex is a nickname, sometimes used for someone from the U.S. state of Texas.

== People ==
- Robert Allen (actor) (1906–1998), American film actor
- Tex Austin (1886–1938), American rodeo promoter
- Tex Avery (1908–1980), American animator, cartoonist, and director, famous for producing animated cartoons
- Tex Banwell (1917–1999), British Second World War soldier and decoy for General Bernard Montgomery
- Tex Beneke (1914–2000), American saxophonist, singer, and bandleader
- Tex Brashear (born 1955), American voice actor, previously in radio
- Tex Carleton (1906–1977), American Major League Baseball pitcher
- Tex Clevenger (1932–2019), American Major League Baseball pitcher
- Randall "Tex" Cobb (born 1950), American boxer and actor
- Tex Coulter (1924–2007), American National Football League lineman
- Tex Erwin (1885–1963), American Major League Baseball catcher
- Tex Fischer, American politician
- Tex Hill (1915–2007), American World War II flying ace and brigadier general
- Tex Hughson (1916–1993), American Major League Baseball pitcher
- Tex Irvin (1906–1978), American football player
- Tex Jeanes (1900–1973), American Major League Baseball player
- Alvin M. Johnston (1914–1998), American test pilot
- Tex Maule (1915–1981), American football writer for Sports Illustrated magazine
- Tex McDonald (1891–1943), America Major League Baseball player
- Tex Morton (1916–1983), New Zealand singer
- Tex Perkins (born 1964), Australian rock musician
- Tex Rickard (1870–1929), American boxing promoter, founder of the New York Rangers hockey team and builder of the third incarnation of Madison Square Garden
- Tex Ritter (1905–1974), American country singer and actor
- Tex Schramm (1920–2003), original president and general manager of the U.S. National Football League's Dallas Cowboys franchise
- Tex Shirley (1918–1993), American Major League Baseball pitcher
- Mark Teixeira (born 1980), Major League Baseball player
- Taylor Walker (footballer) (born 1990), Australian rules footballer
- Tex Watson (born 1945), American murderer and former member of the Manson Family
- Tex Williams (1917–1985), American country musician
- Tex Winter (1922–2018), American basketball coach
- Tex Wisterzil (1888–1964), American Major League Baseball player

== Fictional characters ==
- Tex Murphy, the main character of five adventure games from Access Software
- Tex Randall, a 47-foot tall cowboy figure constructed in 1959 in Canyon, Texas
- Tex Sawyer, villain from the Texas Chainsaw Massacre franchise
- Tex Thompson, a DC Comics superhero
- Tex Willer, a character in an Italian comic book of the same name
- Tex Dinoco, a character from the 2006 film Cars, a personified Cadillac Coupe de Ville
- The title character of Tex Granger, a 1948 movie serial
- Tex Hex, a character from the 1987 animated series BraveStarr
- Tex Richman, a character from the 2011 film The Muppets
- Tex, a penguin villager from the video game series Animal Crossing
- Tex, the mascot for THX
- Tex (Red vs. Blue), in the webseries Red vs. Blue
- Vortex "Tex", in the animated series Helluva Boss, voiced by James Monroe Iglehart

== See also ==
- Tex (disambiguation)
