= Wicked Tinkers (album) =

Studio album by Wicked Tinkers
- Released: October 30, 1998
- Recorded: Summer of 1998
- Genre: Celtic
- Label: Thistle Pricks Productions
- Producer: Wicked Tinkers

Wicked Tinkers chronology
Wicked Tinkers (1998)	Hammered (2000)

Wicked Tinkers is the debut album released by Wicked Tinkers.

== Musicians ==
- Aaron Shaw
- John MacAdams
- Warren Casey

== Track listing ==
1. The Bird Set
2. Hugh Ross Set
3. Seal Set
4. Strathspey & reel
5. The Odd Set
6. The Ferret Set
7. Wallop The Cat
8. 6/8 Marches
9. The Pumpkin's Fancy
10. A Flame of Wrath
11. Aaron's Set
12. Roasty Set
13. Fiollaigean
14. Hornpipe/jig Set

== Credits ==
Produced by Thistle Pricks Productions & Wicked Tinkers

Recorded by Shep Lonsdale. Assistant recording engineer: June Murakawa. Bagpipe recording assistant: Bill Doebler. Small pipes loaned by Eric Rigler.

Recorded at Castle Oaks Productions, Calabasas, CA, and Kaboom Studios, Santa Monica, CA.

Mixed by Shep Lonsdale at Kaboom Studios, Santa Monica, CA.

Mastered by Brian Gardner at Bernie Grundman Mastering, Hollywood, CA.

Art Direction: Warren Casey Design & Production: James Suelflow Photography: Evan Hurd Copy Editor: Jim Hull

== Reviews ==
"If my car suddenly acquired one of those earthshaking sound systems that vibrates windows for a block in each direction, this might be the first CD I'd play. There's nothing subtle, or serious, about these guys—just three smiling lads from California with a set of Highland bagpipes and assorted drums, having a lot of fun blasting away on an assortment of traditional and modern Scottish jigs, reels, hornpipes, and marches. A percussive wall of sound from snare and tenor drums and a booming Macedonian bass tappan reinforce Aaron Shaw's turbocharged piping on most tracks, with a couple of slow airs thrown in for a breather. Highly recommended for anyone who likes Scottish pipes and drums played with skill and power, or who just wants to scare off the neighbors." [www.dirtylinen.com]T.J. McGrath -- © Dirty Linen, Ltd. All rights reserved
