= Nkau =

- Community Council
- Geographic Center of Community
- Coordinates: 29°56′53″S 28°19′05″E
- Country: Lesotho
- District: Mohale's Hoek District
- Elevation: 6,713 ft (2,046 m)

Population (2006)
  - Total: 9,092
- Time zone: UTC+2 (CAT)
- Coordinates computed from Lesotho Villages file.

Nkau is a community council located in the Mohale's Hoek District of Lesotho. Its population in 2006 was 9,092.

== Villages ==
The community of Nkau includes the villages of Ha 'Muso, Ha Boroko, Ha Chalotsane, Ha Emile, Ha Jopo, Ha Kahlolo, Ha Kajeng, Ha Kepa, Ha Kojoana, Ha Lechesa, Ha Lenyatsa, Ha Liau, Ha Madodene, Ha Makhetha, Ha Malatsi, Ha Masilo, Ha Matsa, Ha Moahloli, Ha Moepholi, Ha Mohlokoane, Ha Mokhele, Ha Mokone, Ha Mokotso, Ha Molele, Ha Moleleki, Ha Morema, Ha Motolopo, Ha Motsie, Ha Mphuthela, Ha Mpusi, Ha Nkopane, Ha Nonyane, Ha Ntoahae, Ha Ntoane, Ha Phafoli, Ha Pholo, Ha Rabele, Ha Rankhoba, Ha Romane, Ha Seeqela, Ha Selone, Ha Seqhoke, Ha Setlhotlelo, Ha Setone, Ha Thiba-li-eme, Ha Thuhloane, Ha Tlelaka, Ha Tšolo, Hloahloeng, Khamolane, Khilibiting, Khilibiting (Ha Ralebona), Khohlong, Khubetsoana, Leribe, Lilibaneng, Lithabaneng, Lithakong, Mafosieng, Makokong, Maqolong, Matlapeng, Matšabeng, Motse-Mocha, Mphoko, Pitsaneng, Qabanyane (Ha Malinyane), Sehaula and Thabong.
