= Seroto =

- Community Council
- Geographic Center of Community
- Coordinates: 29°58′30″S 27°57′56″E
- Country: Lesotho
- District: Mohale's Hoek District
- Elevation: 6,300 ft (1,920 m)

Population (2006)
  - Total: 7,836
- Time zone: UTC+2 (CAT)
- Coordinates computed from Lesotho Villages file.

Seroto is a community council located in the Mohale's Hoek District of Lesotho, Africa. Its population in 2006 was 7,836.

== Villages ==
The community of Seroto includes the villages of:

- Foreisetata (Ha Letsaba)
- Ha 'Meta
- Ha Bakhafi
- Ha Bati
- Ha Bolae
- Ha Damane
- Ha Hlalele
- Ha Hou
- Ha Jobo
- Ha Katse
- Ha Khoalinyane
- Ha Korone
- Ha Laene
- Ha Makara
- Ha Makatla
- Ha Marame
- Ha Mathibeli
- Ha Matsoelipane
- Ha Mohlakoana
- Ha Mokhoabane
- Ha Molobeli
- Ha Moremang
- Ha Motlohi
- Ha Motseki
- Ha Ntsene
- Ha Ntsuku
- Ha Pata
- Ha Pokola
- Ha Potso
- Ha Qoboko
- Ha Rabele
- Ha Ralimpe
- Ha Ramakholela
- Ha Ramasimong
- Ha Ramosothoane
- Ha Ranti
- Ha Raseboto
- Ha Salae
- Ha Seaka
- Ha Sefehle
- Ha Sefoboko
- Ha Selebalo
- Ha Sepenya
- Ha Sephoko
- Ha Seturumane
- Ha Shakhane
- Ha Shoele
- Ha Thabo Matete
- Ha Thamahanyane
- Ha Thetsinyane
- Ha Thobei (Khohlong)
- Hohobeng
- Kheseng
- Khothong (Ha Mapou)
- Khubetsoana
- Koung (Ha Maepho)
- Koung (Ha Motlatsi)
- Koung (Matebeleng)
- Lekhalong
- Lekhalong (Ha Rasephokoana)
- Lekhalong (Tiping)
- Lekokong
- Letlapeng
- Letsatsing
- Lihlolong
- Linotšing
- Lithipeng
- Litšepeng
- Makhetheng
- Malinakana
- Matebeleng
- Matlakeng
- Mechalleng
- Mofufutsong
- Mohlakeng
- Moru-Motšo
- Morunyaneng
- Motheoaneng
- Motuoaneng
- Ntlhasinye
- Paballong
- Phocha
- Qiloane
- Sekhutlong
- Thaba-Chitja
- Thaba-Sephara
- Thabana-Tšooana
- Thabaneng
- Thepung
- Tšoeneng and Tšoeu-e'a-penya
