= Thaba Mokhele =

- Community Council
- Geographic Center of Community
- Coordinates: 30°01′25″S 27°33′01″E
- Country: Lesotho
- District: Mohale's Hoek District
- Elevation: 5,682 ft (1,732 m)

Population (2006)
  - Total: 18,135
- Time zone: UTC+2 (CAT)
- Coordinates computed from Lesotho Villages file.

Thaba Mokhele is a community council located in the Mohale's Hoek District of Lesotho. Its population in 2006 was 18,135.

== Villages ==
The community of Thaba-Mokhele includes the villages of:

- Boikhutsong
- Five Rand
- Ha 'Mako
- Ha Belemane
- Ha Biane
- Ha Bokoro
- Ha Chefa
- Ha Faetoa
- Ha Jimi
- Ha Kaphe (Maholong)
- Ha Kaphe (Moreneng)
- Ha Khanyane
- Ha Khoale
- Ha Kholoane
- Ha Kooko
- Ha Lisene
- Ha Mabaka
- Ha Mahlelebe
- Ha Mahooana (Mahahaneng)
- Ha Mako (Ha Folatsane)
- Ha Mako (Mahlalela)
- Ha Mapuru
- Ha Maqeba
- Ha Maqoala
- Ha Masita
- Ha Matseo
- Ha Moeletsi
- Ha Mohale
- Ha Mokhothu
- Ha Mokunyane
- Ha Moloche
- Ha Monakalali
- Ha Moshabe
- Ha Mosika
- Ha Mosotho
- Ha Mothe
- Ha Mothetho
- Ha Ntepe
- Ha Ntsapi
- Ha Pekenene
- Ha Phala
- Ha Pitseng
- Ha Qoane
- Ha Rakhenku
- Ha Ralepei
- Ha Ramahloli
- Ha Ramahlolonyane
- Ha Ramatlali
- Ha Ramokongoane
- Ha Rampeli
- Ha Rantšoeu
- Ha Ranyakane
- Ha Rasebolelo
- Ha Rathobeli
- Ha Ratšoeu
- Ha Seabata
- Ha Sehloho
- Ha Sekunyane
- Ha Sepinare (Moreneng)
- Ha Sepinare (Sekiring)
- Ha Soere
- Ha Taele
- Ha Tepa
- Ha Thetela
- Ha Thokoa
- Ha Tšese
- Hloahloeng
- Hohobeng
- Kalakeng
- Khang-ka-Khotso
- Kholokoe
- Kolobere
- Kopialena
- Lefikeng
- Lefikeng (Thaba-Tšoeu)
- Lekhalong
- Letlapeng
- Lifateng (Ha Nkunyane)
- Lifateng (Lekhalong)
- Lifateng (Moreneng)
- Lifateng (Motse-Mocha)
- Lifateng (Thoteng)
- Lifateng (Tšoeneng)
- Linokong
- Liphofung (Ha Ralijeng)
- Lithabaneng (Boithatelo)
- Lithakaling
- Maboneng
- Makhaloaneng
- Makutoaneng
- Maqoala
- Matsatseng
- Matsaung
- Matsekeng
- Matsoapong
- Motsekong
- Nk'hunk'hu
- Nkoboto
- Noka-Ntšo
- Nomoroane
- Ntširele
- Patisa
- Phahameng
- Phohlokong
- Pontšeng
- Sehlabaneng
- Senekane
- Terai Hoek (Ha Molomo)
- Thabana- Ntšonyana
- Thabaneng-tsa-Marole
- Thoteng and Tutululung
