= Wicked Tinkers =

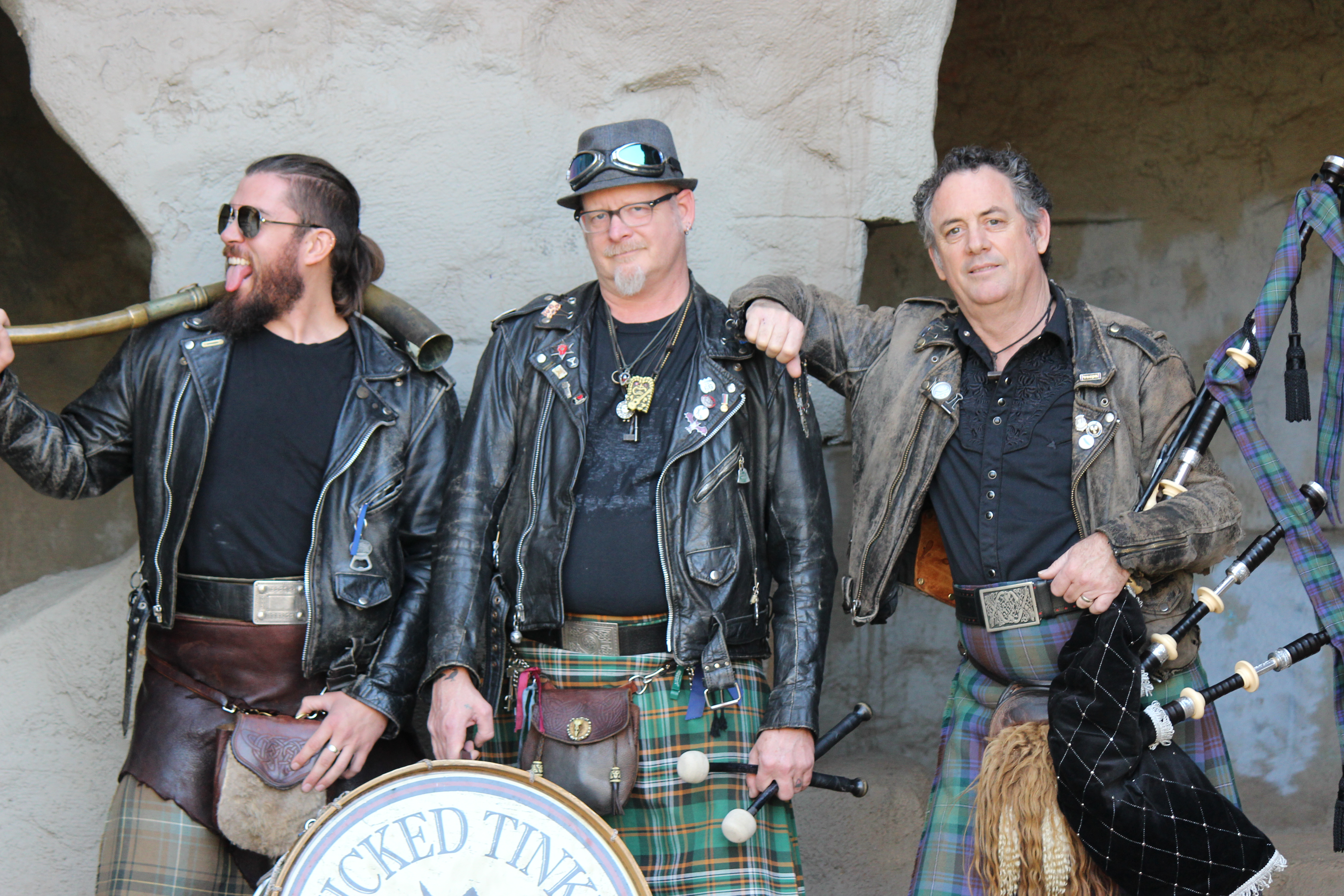
- Wicked Tinkers at the Old Zoo, Griffith Park. 2018

Background information
- Years active: 1995–present
- Members: Aaron Shaw; CJ Henderson; Tiki King
- Past members: Warren Casey; Jay Atwood; John MacAdams; Wayne Belger; Keith Jones
- Website: wickedtinkers.com

The Wicked Tinkers are an American Celtic music group who perform at many Scottish/Irish festivals.

== History ==
The group was formed in the early 1990s when piper Aaron Shaw met bass drum player Warren Casey and percussionist John MacAdams at The Celtic Arts Center in Los Angeles, California. They have been a professional touring band since 1995. They play regularly at Scottish Festivals and Highland Games, and festivals have sometimes changed their dates to allow the Wicked Tinkers play for them. The band headlines at many Renaissance festivals as well, including the Northern California Renaissance Faire. They also have played many charity concerts including cancer benefits, and even a concert to support a Pregnant Mare Rescue horse sanctuary.

Aaron Shaw has been playing the bagpipes since 1976. He began attending the College of Piping Summer School in 1982, becoming an instructor there in 1996. Aaron has been a Piping Judge with WUSPBA since 2000 and, in addition to his private students, teaches at the California Summer School of Piping and Drumming and the Jim Thomson US School of Piping and Drumming and various seminars around the country.

Aaron Shaw has recorded bagpipes for Bonnie Raitt on "Luck of the Draw". He also played for Owl on "The Right Thing" track called Rover about Chris Wyse's Irish connection. He played for Lee Dewyze on American Idol Season 9.

The band has evolved over the years. Keith Jones joined the band in 2000, playing snare drum and hand percussion. Keith is endorsed by Vic Firth drum sticks and many others. Keith Jones officially left the band in 2022.

In 2009, CJ Henderson replaced Jay Atwood on didgeridoo. Prior to becoming part of the band, CJ was a fan of the Wicked Tinkers and started learning didgeridoo because of the group. He was eventually invited to join the band. He also plays the Bronze Age Irish Horn.

Founding Member Warren Casey retired from the band in 2013, with the Reverend Dr. Tiki King taking his place. He was previously the Wicked Tinker's sound technician. Tiki King is an artist, founder of Ukuleles of Felton and a ukulele luthier. Tiki King and Aaron met in Santa Cruz in the late 1980s and played together originally in punk bands.

Notable appearances include The Late Late Show with Craig Ferguson, during which, host Craig Ferguson accompanied them on a drum. Mixed martial arts fighter Keith Jardine has used their song "Bog" as entrance music in several UFC events. The band also appears in season 4 of the Cable TV show "Arrested Development". In 2017 the Wicked Tinkers competed on the Gong Show revival, episode 4, where they received a perfect 10 score. In 2018, the Wicked Tinkers were runner up in Good Times Santa Cruz's best local band category, and Tiki King was selected best musician

== Current members ==
- Aaron Shaw - great Highland bagpipe
- The Reverend Dr. Tiki King - Big Drum, rhythm pole, Ukulele
- CJ Henderson - didgeridoo, Bronze Age Irish Horn, bodhran

== Guests ==
Members of the Celtic group Bad Haggis joined the Wicked Tinkers for performances at the 2005 and 2006 Seaside Games in Ventura, California.

== Discography ==
- Brutal (1997) (cassette)
- Banned (1999) (cassette)
- Wicked Tinkers (1999)
- Hammered (2000)
- Loud (2002)
- Banger For Breakfast (2003)
- Whisky Supper (2005)
- Rant (2007)
- Big Bottle Of Bad Ideas (2016)
