= Qobong =

- Community Council
- Geographic Center of Community
- Coordinates: 30°04′46″S 27°47′21″E
- Country: Lesotho
- District: Mohale's Hoek District
- Elevation: 6,056 ft (1,846 m)

Population (2006)
  - Total: 9,324
- Time zone: UTC+2 (CAT)
- Coordinates computed from Lesotho Villages file.

Qobong is a community council located in the Mohale's Hoek District of Lesotho. Its population in 2006 was 9,324.

== Villages ==
The community of Qobong includes the villages of:

- Biafa
- Boiketlo
- Boitelo
- Boritsa
- Ha 'Mankieane
- Ha Beila
- Ha Challa
- Ha Koenane (Ha Maama)
- Ha Kori
- Ha Lepeli
- Ha Lephoto
- Ha Mahaha
- Ha Maponyane
- Ha Masia
- Ha Matebesi
- Ha Mavela
- Ha Mokoenehi
- Ha Mokotjane
- Ha Mololi
- Ha Mosaletsane
- Ha Moshaba (Ha Mpholle)
- Ha Motalane
- Ha Motopi
- Ha Motumi
- Ha Mpeki (Taung)
- Ha Nohana
- Ha Ntebele
- Ha Ntinyane
- Ha Ntja
- Ha Ntsokoane
- Ha Nyape
- Ha Pokola
- Ha Rabosiu
- Ha Ramorake
- Ha Ranyali
- Ha Raseboko
- Ha Sebili
- Ha Sebinane
- Ha Seithati
- Ha Sekhohola
- Ha Sele
- Ha Senyane
- Ha Sethobane
- Ha Shokhoa (Makunyapane)
- Ha Tau
- Ha Thaba
- Ha Tlhabeli
- Ha Toko
- Ha Tsuinyane
- Kamor'a-Thaba
- Khakhathane
- Khoating
- Khohlong
- Khorong
- Khorong (Ha Hlooana)
- Khotha
- Khubetsoana
- Khutsong
- Kokobe
- Lefarung
- Lekhalong
- Leqatha
- Leralleng
- Letlapeng
- Lichecheng
- Liefereng
- Lipereng
- Liqaleng
- Litšiloaneng
- Mabeleteng
- Mafika-Lisiu
- Maloreng
- Mamollo
- Mankung
- Masuoaneng
- Mateanong
- Matebeleng
- Materentseng
- Matlapaneng
- Matlopo
- Matsoapong
- Mokeke
- Mokoallong
- Paka-tsa-matsatsa
- Phohlokong
- Poling
- Qobong
- Qomo-Qomo (Mafikeng)
- Ralesollane
- Ralitšibana
- Sekokong
- Seshaing
- Terai Hoek
- Thaba-Lethu
- Thababa-Litlholo
- Thibella
- Thoteng
- Tšepong and Tsoelike.
