= Qabane =

- Community Council
- Geographic Center of Community
- Coordinates: 29°56′41″S 28°27′27″E
- Country: Lesotho
- District: Mohale's Hoek District
- Elevation: 6,552 ft (1,997 m)

Population (2006)
  - Total: 6,924
- Time zone: UTC+2 (CAT)
- Coordinates computed from Lesotho Villages file.

Qabane is a community council located in the Mohale's Hoek District of Lesotho. Its population in 2006 was 6,924.

== Villages ==
The community of Qabane includes the villages of Bareng, Ha 'Malehlakana, Ha Enerese, Ha Khate, Ha Letumanyane, Ha Masupha, Ha Moeti, Ha Mohlomo, Ha Moisa, Ha Mokoafo, Ha Molisana, Ha Montsi, Ha Mosebi, Ha Mosobe, Ha Motšoanakaba, Ha Mpolokoana, Ha Pesi, Ha Phalo, Ha Qalatsa, Ha Qoloane, Ha Ramatatiele, Ha Ramorutlho, Ha Rantaoleng, Ha Rathaha, Ha Seeiso, Ha Seilane, Ha Setofolo, Ha Shauli, Ha Tsemane, Ha Tsoane, Ha Tšosane, Ha Tumahole, Khama-Khamane, Khatleng, Khohlong (Ha Baholo), Khomong, Lekhalong, Letsoapong, Litejaneng, Litšoeneng, Makokoaneng, Maphutseng (Ha Talatala), Matateng, Matsatsaneng, Matsoeteng, Moeaneng, Mokoallong, Phula-Likhama, Phuthing, Polasi, Poriking, Qeng, Sek'hene, Sekameng, Sekitsing (Ha K'hefase), Setebatebe, Sethaleng, Shopong, Taung, Tesi, Thaba-Tšoeu and Tiping.
