= Phamong =

- Community Council
- Geographic Center of Community
- Coordinates: 30°12′15″S 27°47′20″E
- Country: Lesotho
- District: Mohale's Hoek District
- Constituency: Phamong

Government
  - Principal Chief: Nthati Bereng Bereng
- Elevation: 5,374 ft (1,638 m)

Population (2006)
  - Total: 8,402
- Time zone: UTC+2 (CAT)
- Coordinates computed from Lesotho Villages file.

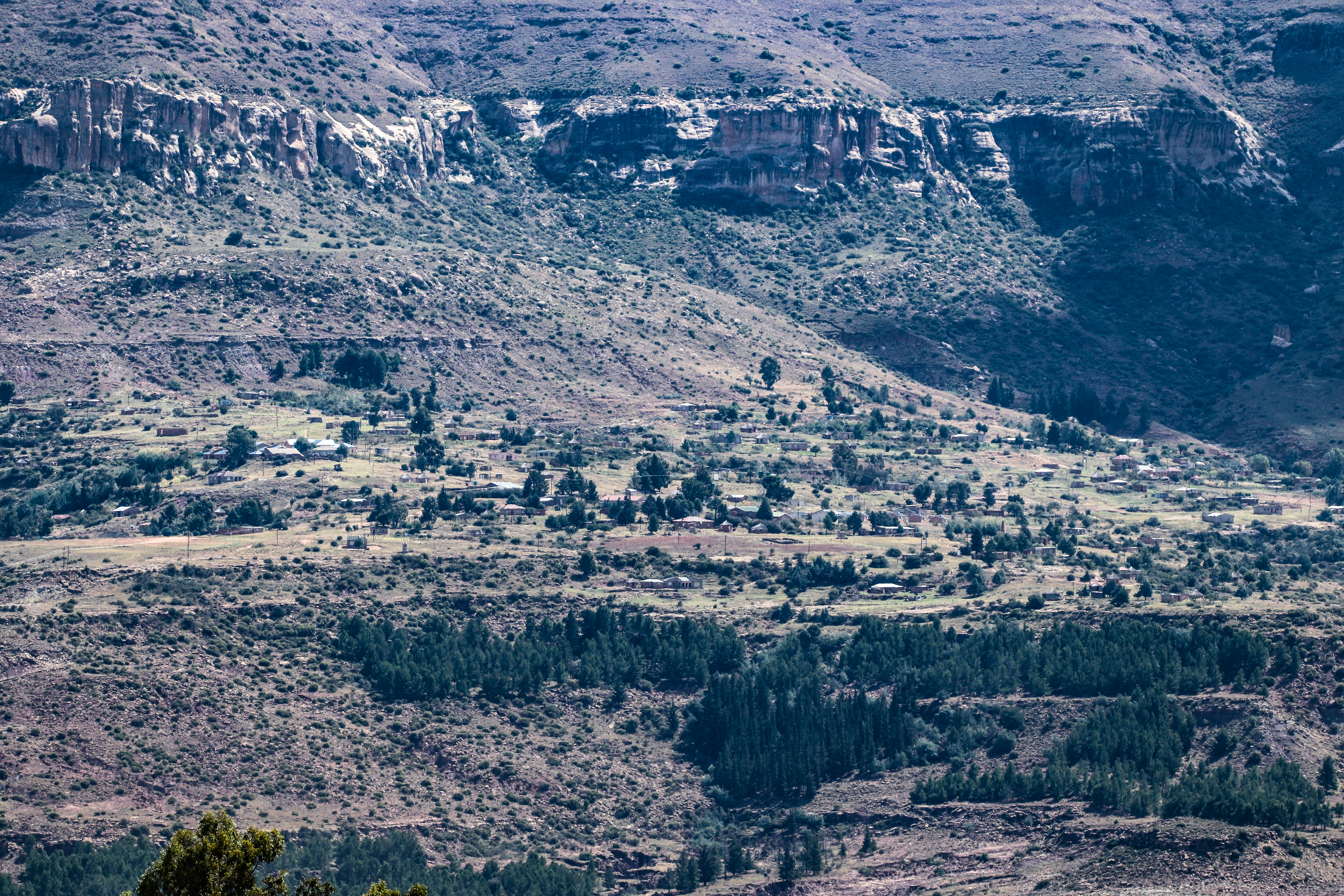
Phamong, Moreneng, Mohale's Hoek

Phamong is a community council located in the Mohale's Hoek District of Lesotho. Its population in 2006 was 8,402. Chieftainess Nthati Bereng Bereng was confirmed into office as Principal Chief of Phamong at a ceremony presided over by King Letsie III on August 27, 2004. The inauguration follows the death of her husband in 2002.

== Villages ==
The community of Phamong includes the villages of Fika-Khomo, Ha K'hobo, Ha Kheleli, Ha Lehloenya, Ha Lempe, Ha Lempe (Lithabaneng), Ha Lethena, Ha Lipakela, Ha Makara, Ha Makausi, Ha Makhafola, Ha Malephane, Ha Meso, Ha Mk'hono, Ha Mokoto, Ha Mpompo, Ha Ntloana, Ha Ntoi, Ha Phalana, Ha Phokoana, Ha Putsoana, Ha Qacha, Ha Qiqita, Ha Qiqita (Hloahloeng), Ha Qiqita (Mohlakeng), Ha Rachabana, Ha Rajoalane, Ha Ralekhaola, Ha Ramabutsoela, Ha Ratsoane, Ha Seteke, Ha Taba-li-atile, Ha Tankele (Mafoseng), Ha Tankele (Maqalikeng), Ha Tapisi, Ha Teboho, Ha Teboho (Ha Makhofola), Ha Tlhong, Hekeng (Ha Makhabane), Khubetsoana, Koti-se-phola, Liboti, Likhohloaneng, Likotolaneng, Lipeleng, Matsetseng, Methalaneng, Mothating, Motse-Mocha, Phamong (Aupolasi), Phamong (Makaung), Phamong (Motse-Mocha), Phatlalla, Phiring (Ha Mphole), Phiring (Matoporong), Phiring (Moreneng), Phiring (Motse-Mocha), Phiring (Mpobong), Sealuma, Seforong, Sekoting, Sepotong, Thepung, Thoteng, Tlhakoaneng and Tšepong.
