= Tekes =

Tekes may refer to:

- Tekes (agency), the Finnish Funding Agency for Technology and Innovation
- Tekes River in Kazakhstan and China, a tributary of the Ili River
- Tekes County in Xinjiang, China, on the eponymous river
- Tekes Town, the county seat of Tekes County
- Members of Tau Kappa Epsilon, a social college fraternity

== See also ==
- Tékes, a village in Hungary
- Teke people, a Bantu-speaking ethnic group in Equatorial Africa
- Tekezé River in Ethiopia
- Teke (disambiguation)
- Tex (disambiguation)
