= Mex =

MEX or Mex may refer to:

== Places ==
- Mexico (ISO 3166-1 alpha-3 and UNDP country code MEX), a country in the southern portion of North America
  - State of Mexico (ISO 3166 subnational region code MEX), a subnational division, a state in the country of Mexico
  - Mexico City (LOCODE subnational code MEX), a city, the capital city of the country of Mexico
  - Mexico City International Airport (IATA airport code MEX)
- Mex, Valais, Switzerland
- Mex, Vaud, Switzerland
- Mexborough railway station (station code MEX), Mexborough, Doncaster, South Yorkshire, England, UK
- Maju Expressway (MEX), an expressway in Kuala Lumpur, Malaysia
- Boyd Martin Theatre, or The MeX, in The Kentucky Center, Louisville, Kentucky, U.S.

== People ==
- Mex Urtizberea (born 1960), Argentine musician and actor
- Byron Johnson (baseball) (1911–2005), also known as Mex Johnson, American baseball player

== Computing ==
- MEX (windowing system), computer software
- MEX file, a type of C/C++ or FORTRAN source code in MATLAB scripts

== Science, mathematics, logic, medicine ==
- Mex (mathematics), in game theory
- Mars Express, a space exploration mission
- Monohalomethane (MeX), a class of chemical compounds, with Me representing methyl group and X representing a halogen

== Other uses ==
- Metro Express (1985-1987; ICAO airline code MEX), a defunct U.S. airline; see List of airline codes (M)
- Metropolexpress (MEX), a type of local passenger trains in Baden-Württemberg

== See also ==
- Mex-Mex
- Tex-Mex (disambiguation)
- Mexico (disambiguation)
