= Teke, Lesotho =

Teke
- Community Council
- Geographic Center of Community
- Coordinates: 30°10′12″S 27°35′18″E
- Country: Lesotho
- District: Mohale's Hoek District
- Elevation: 5,299 ft (1,615 m)

Population (2006)
  - Total: 5,403
- Time zone: UTC+2 (CAT)
- Coordinates computed from Lesotho Villages file.

Teke is a community council located in the Mohale's Hoek District of Lesotho. Its population in 2006 was 5,403.

== Villages ==
The community of Teke includes the villages of Ha 'Nete, Ha Khalo, Ha Lecheche, Ha Lekhoelea, Ha Lelinyane, Ha Lesala (Maphutseng), Ha Mabula, Ha Mafethe, Ha Mokutu, Ha Monehela, Ha Moroke, Ha Moseletsane, Ha Noto, Ha Nthant'so, Ha Ntsibi, Ha Pekenene, Ha Qone, Ha Ralefatla, Ha Ramolulela, Ha Ramonyatsi, Ha Ramoroa, Ha Rankopane, Ha Salemane, Ha Sebatli, Ha Selemo, Ha Suoane, Ha Talinyana, Ha Teke, Ha Thamahanyane, Ha Tlelenki (Monyameng), Ha Tloko, Lekhalong, Liphokoaneng, Mahali-Hali, Makhesuoeng, Makilanyaneng (Maphutseng), Manganeng, Maporoteng, Maqhatseng, Matebeleng, Mokali-Motšo, Mootsinyana, Mootsinyane, Moseneke (Ha Ramolahlehi), Moseneke (Moreneng), Moseneke (Mpokho), Motlomong, Sekolong, Thaba-Phiri, Thanda-Bantu, Thepung and Tutulung.
