= Mashaleng =

- Community Council
- Geographic Center of Community
- Coordinates: 30°05′39″S 27°25′08″E
- Country: Lesotho
- District: Mohale's Hoek District
- Elevation: 4,754 ft (1,449 m)

Population (2006)
  - Total: 21,869
- Time zone: UTC+2 (CAT)
- Coordinates computed from Lesotho Villages file.

Mashaleng is a community council located in the Mohale's Hoek District of Lesotho. Its population in 2006 was 21,869.

== Villages ==
The community of Mashaleng includes following villages

- Boikano,
- Bulu-Bulu,
- Ha Bolokoe,
- Ha Janki,
- Ha Keeke,
- Ha Khapise,
- Ha Khitšane,
- Ha Lebitsa,
- Ha Lehloibi,
- Ha Lekhema,
- Ha Lekhooe,
- Ha Lipala (Sekhutlong),
- Ha Mabalane,
- Ha Mahase,
- Ha Mahoete,
- Ha Makhate,
- Ha Malebanye,
- Ha Maphohloane,
- Ha Mapooane,
- Ha Mokhatla,
- Ha Mokhesi,
- Ha Mokhethi,
- Ha Mokoinihi,
- Ha Mopooane,
- Ha Mphaki,
- Ha Nchoba,
- Ha Ntikoane,
- Ha Panta,
- Ha Potsane,
- Ha Rakila,
- Ha Ralekhetla,
- Ha Ralitlhokoe,
- Ha Ramoitoi,
- Ha Raphiri,
- Ha Raphokoane,
- Ha Thekiso,
- Ha Thoriso,
- Ha Thuhlo,
- Ha Tšepo,
- Ha Tšepo (Ha Mokatse),
- Ha Tšepo (Matlapa-Masoeu),
- Ha Tšolo, Hleoheng,
- Khuthong,
- Letsoaing,
- Lihojeng,
- Likhutloaneng,
- Likueneng,
- Lipeleng,
- Majakaneng,
- Majoe-Masoeu,
- Makhapetla,
- Makhineng,
- Manyeleng,
- Maqhena,
- Marakong,
- Maseteling (Ha Makhate),
- Matebeleng,
- Matlapaneng,
- Matsatseng,
- Mohlanapeng,
- Moreneng,
- Motse-Mocha,
- Nama-u-lule (Qhalasi),
- Old Hoek,
- Phahameng,
- Pontšeng,
- Qalakheng
- Thabeng.
