= Nestlé Tex =

South African chocolate bar

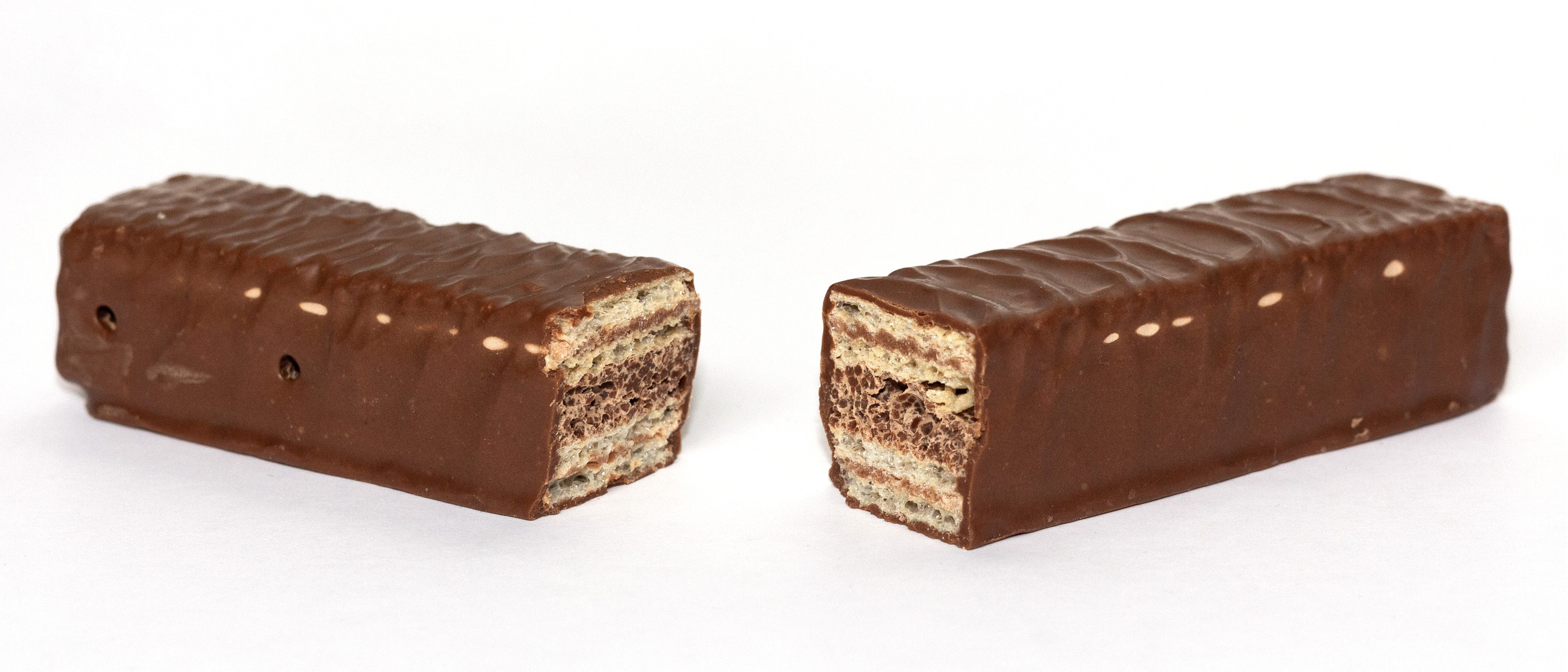
- Nestlé Tex bar split in two
- Product type: Confectionery
- Current owner: Nestlé
- Country: Canada, South Africa
- Introduced: 1955; 71 years ago
- Markets: South Africa, formerly Canada
- Previous owners: Rowntree's (1955)
- Website: nestle.com/tex

Nestlé Tex, stylised as TEX, is a South African candy bar made by Nestlé.

== Overview ==
Tex was created in around 1955 by Rowntree's, and first sold in Canada (around the same time as Coffee Crisp). The bar combines the aerated chocolate of Aero with the wafers of a Kit Kat, and is covered in milk chocolate. Rowntree's launched Tex to the South African market in 1956, where it had more success and is still sold to this day. Rowntree's was later acquired by Nestlé, and now Tex is under the Nestlé brand. Tex was later discontinued in Canada, but is still available via import shops catering to South African expats. As of February 2015, Tex weighed 40 grams. It is easy to spot with its yellow wrapper.

== See also ==
- Aero
- Kit Kat
- Rowntree's
- Chocolate Log
- Peppermint Crisp
