= Texan (disambiguation) =

A Texan is a person associated with Texas, United States. See list of people from Texas.

Texan may also refer to:

== Aircraft ==
- T-6 Texan, World War II era training plane
- T-6 Texan II, airplane used by the United States Air Force for basic pilot training
- Fly Synthesis Texan, an Italian ultralight aircraft

== Entertainment ==
- The Texan (fictional character), a character in Catch-22
- The Texans, 1938 film starring Joan Bennett and Randolph Scott
- The Texan (TV series), CBS TV series from 1958–1960 starring Rory Calhoun
- TexANS, a band featuring Maynard James Keenan

== Sports ==
=== Current sports teams ===
- Houston Texans, National Football League (NFL) team based in Houston, Texas
- Tarleton State Texans, NCAA Division I athletic program representing Tarleton State University in Stephenville, Texas

=== Former sports teams and former names of sports teams ===
- Houston Texans, a 1974 World Football League team that became the Shreveport Steamer
- Dallas Texans (Arena), an Arena Football League team that played from 1990 to 1993
- Dallas Texans (NFL), an NFL team in 1952
- The Dallas Texans, an American Football League team of 1960–1962 that became the Kansas City Chiefs
- San Antonio Texans, a Canadian Football League team that played during the 1995 season
- Dallas Texans (AHA), 1941–1942 team in the American Hockey Association
- Dallas Texans (USHL), 1945–1949 team in the United States Hockey League (1945–1951)

== Transportation ==
- Texan, Frisco Railway long-distance train (St. Louis-Tulsa-Dallas)
- Texan, Missouri Pacific long-distance train (St. Louis-Little Rock-Dallas-Fort Worth)
- Texan, Santa Fe long-distance train (Los Angeles-Houston)

== Other uses ==
- Texan (chocolate bar)
- Texan English
- USS Texan (ID-1354), a US ship
- The Daily Texan, the student newspaper of the University of Texas at Austin

== See also ==
- Texas (disambiguation)
- Texian
- Tejano
