= Tiki King =

American artist and musician

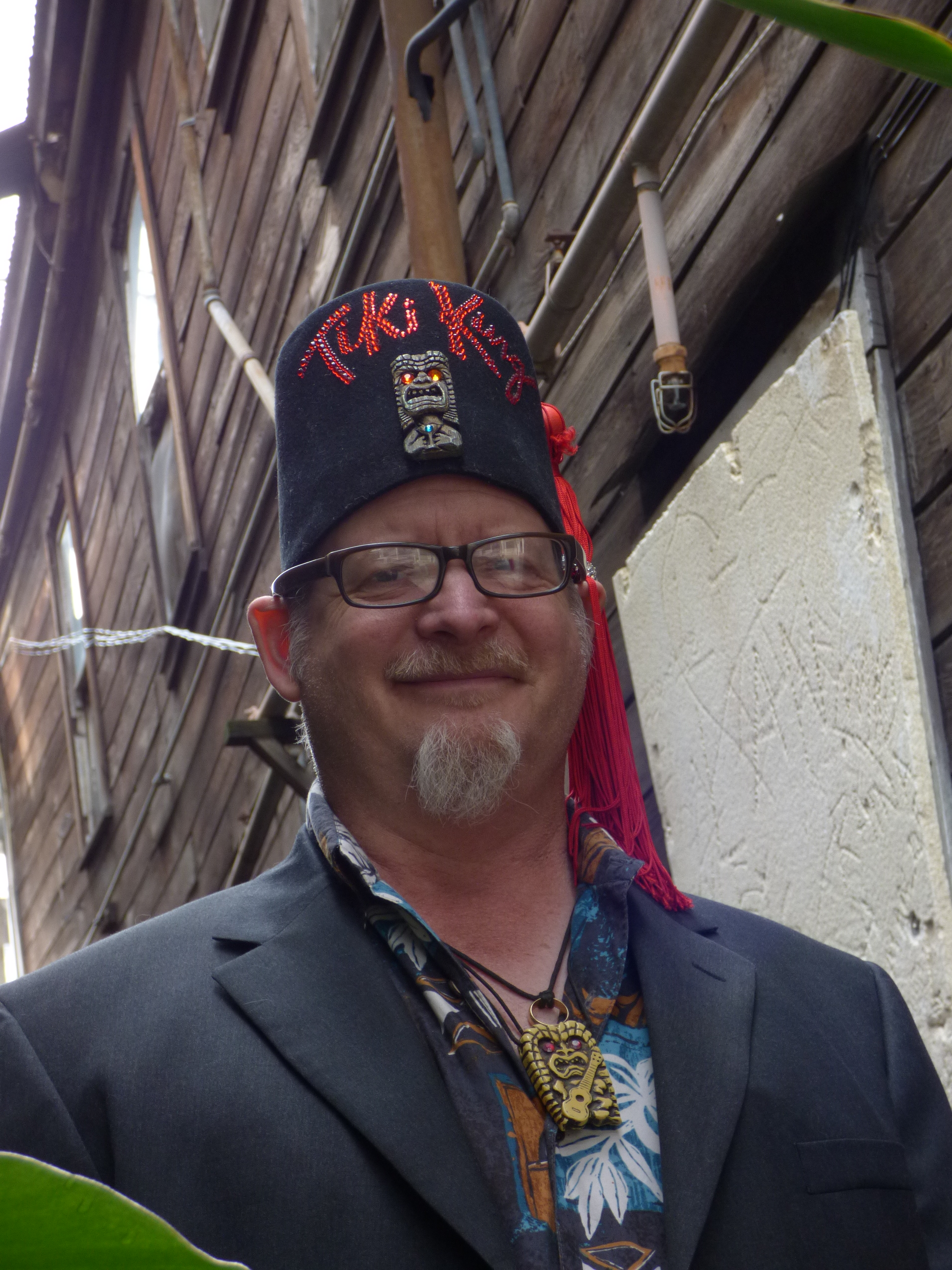
- Tiki King of the Wicked Tinkers at Locke, California in 2017.
- Born: James Patrick Baron; November 14, 1963 (age 62)
- Other names: Tiki King, Reverend Dr. Tiki King, Pat Baron
- Occupations: Musician in Wicked Tinkers; Tiki Artist; Ukulele Builder
- Years active: 1993–present

James Patrick Baron, also known as Tiki King, (born November 14, 1963) is an artist, musician, and luthier. He was an artist in the tiki revival scene of the early 1990s. As a luthier he created the pineapple cutaway double octave ukulele and has designed ukuleles for celebrities such as Greg Hawkes (The Cars) and Bette Midler. He released three solo ukulele CDs as well as one with his lounge band Tiki King and the Idol Pleasures. He currently plays bass drum and ukulele in Tribal Celtic band the Wicked Tinkers who have released a total of nine albums.

== History ==
=== Early life ===
James Patrick Baron was born in Santa Clara, California, but spent most of his childhood in the Santa Cruz Mountains. His father Jim Baron was a stained glass craftsman who loved working with wood and encouraged James (then called Pat) to make his own toys. Pat was given his first scroll saw at age 11 by his father. Not only was Jim a stained glass craftsman, but in his spare time he made furniture, wooden planes, and many other items by hand. This had a major influence on his son's passion for creating and building. With the help of Pat's mother Diane, who was an artist as well, Jim made handcrafted plaques using found redwood and driftwood. They were sold locally under the label "A Fanouga Creation". The name "Fanouga" was invented by a seven-year-old Pat when the family was deciding on a name for their home in the mountains. They settled on 'House of Fanouga' thanks to a very young Tiki King.

=== Artist ===
In 1966 Tiki King's uncle gave his family a 3-foot stone tiki placing it near his childhood playhouse. The carving made a lasting impression and he has been making his own tiki carvings "as long as he can remember". Although his interest started during childhood, he began producing them regularly in the early 1990s, and by 1993 he was selling his carved tiki necklaces and wall art by mail order catalogue. This was during the beginning of the tiki revival and along with other artists, such as Bosko Hrnjak, helped rekindle a love for the tiki culture. In 1994 Tiki King began hosting yearly luaus, a tradition that lasted ten years. Attendees of the luau included Otto Von Stroheim (creator of Tiki Oasis) and Martin Cate (owner of several bars including Smuggler's Cove featuring the largest selection of rum in the USA). Tiki King sculpted and glazed his own tiki mugs for his luaus each year and are now extremely rare. According to Holden Westland, owner of Tiki Farm, Tiki King's mugs were the first "event" tiki mugs of the revival in the early 90's. He became a respected tiki artist creating necklaces, paintings, carvings and sculptures. By 1996 Tiki King had moved his business online and started attending trade shows.

=== Ukuleles ===
Tiki King didn't start playing ukulele until the mid 90's when he bought one for $12. He became obsessed and learned as much about the instrument as he could. He began to create an online database of ukulele makers that would eventually include over 700 entries. This database was the first of its kind. Then, with the guidance of luthier Tony Graziano, he started building and designing his own ukuleles. Tiki King hand carved many ukuleles with tikis on the bodies and headstocks, and developed a pineapple cutaway style on a double octave ukulele he designed. In 2000 he met Jim Beloff who loved his designs and included him in the second edition of his book The ukulele: A visual history. Tiki King has since designed artwork for 15 ukuleles made by the Magic Fluke company. He designed Bette Midler's "Pink Pineapple" ukulele in 2008 for her The Showgirl Must Go On series in Las Vegas and has created original painted art ukuleles for musicians such as Greg Hawkes, Todd Rundgren, and comedian Victoria Jackson. In 2010, after years of mail order, internet sales and trade shows, he opened his physical store, Ukuleles of Felton, in Santa Cruz County. That same year he appeared in the ensemble documentary film Mighty Uke. In 2012, he was the illustrator and his ukuleles were the subject of Andrews McMeel Publishing's "Ukulele 2013 Wall Calendar: The Happiest Little Instrument on the Planet". His store Ukuleles of Felton struggled financially after the first few years, and permanently closed in 2018 although he continues to make Ukuleles.

=== Musician ===
In the early 1980s Tiki King was the singer of a local Santa Cruz Punk rock band called No Excuse. Aaron Shaw, founder of the Celtic music band the Wicked Tinkers, was the guitar player. The band did not formally release any music. Aaron moved to Los Angeles and later formed the Wicked Tinkers in 1995. Tiki King joined the Wicked Tinkers in 2013 taking the place of founding member Warren Casey on bass drum. He plays ukulele and sings in the band as well. In 2017 the Wicked Tinkers appeared on the revival of the Gong Show (Ep.4). They received a perfect 10 score.

In 2018 the Wicked Tinkers were runners up in the local band category of Good Times Santa Cruz, while Pat Baron aka Tiki King was voted best musician.

Prior to joining the Wicked Tinkers, Tiki King published 3 of his own solo ukulele CD's as well as one with his ukulele lounge band Tiki King and the Idol Pleasures in the early 2000s.

== Discography ==
- Tiki King - After Hours (2002)
- Tiki King - With a Twist (2001)
- Tiki King - Monuments EP (2003)
- Tiki King and the Idol Pleasures - Flowers and Monsters (2005)
- Wicked Tinkers - Big Bottle of Bad Ideas (2016)

== Illustrator ==
The Happiest Little Instrument on the Planet, LLC Andrews McMeel Publishing. Andrews McMeel. 2012. ISBN 978-1449420390.

== Film ==
- The Mighty Uke, Optix Digital Pictures and Tiny Goat, (2010) IMDB
