= The Texan =

The Texan may refer to:

- The Texan (fictional character), a character in Catch-22
- The Texan (TV series), starring Rory Calhoun
- The Texan (1920 film), an American film directed by Lynn Reynolds
- The Texan (1930 film), an American film starring Gary Cooper and Fay Wray
- The Texan (1932 film), American western film directed by Clifford S. Smith
- The Texan (play), starring Tyrone Power Sr.
- The Texan (website), online news website founded by former Texas state senator Konni Burton

== See also ==
- The Texans, a 1938 American Western film
- The Texan Meets Calamity Jane, a 1950 American Western film
