= Sabarmatee Tiki =

India's indigenous conservationist and organic farmer from the state of Odisha

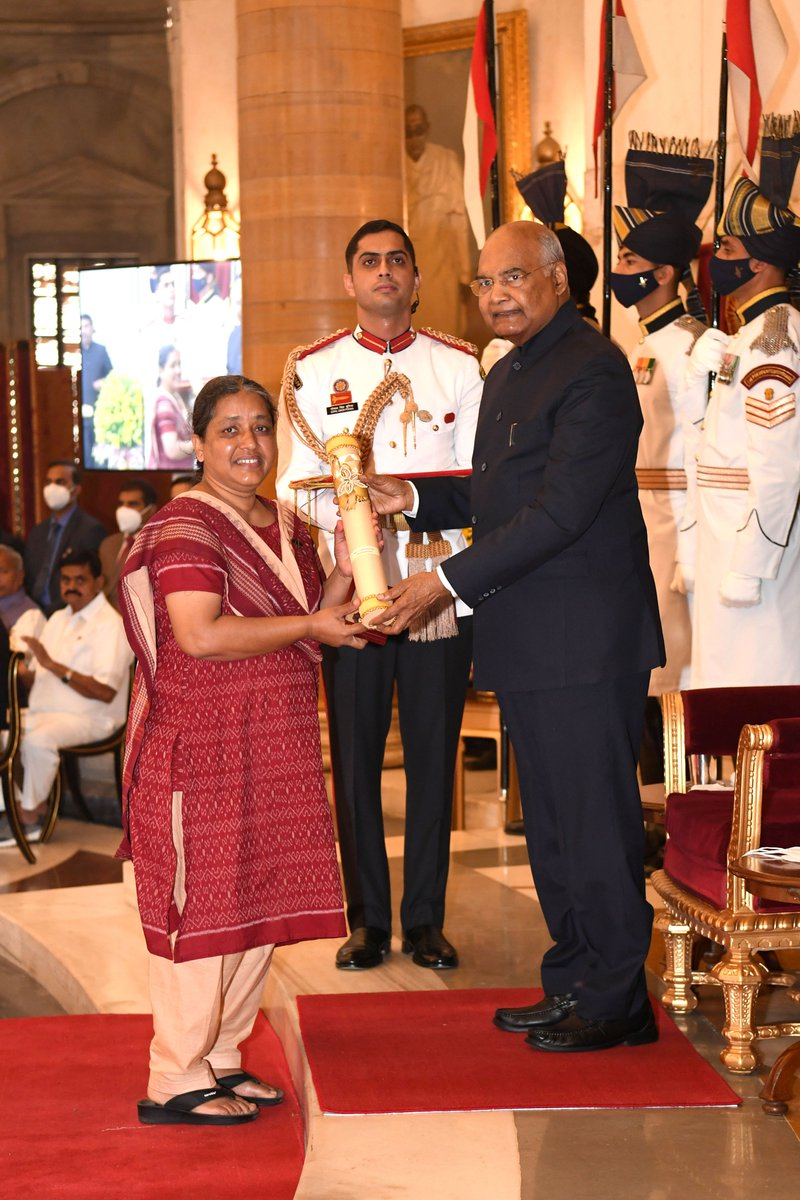
Sabarmatee receives the Padma Shri

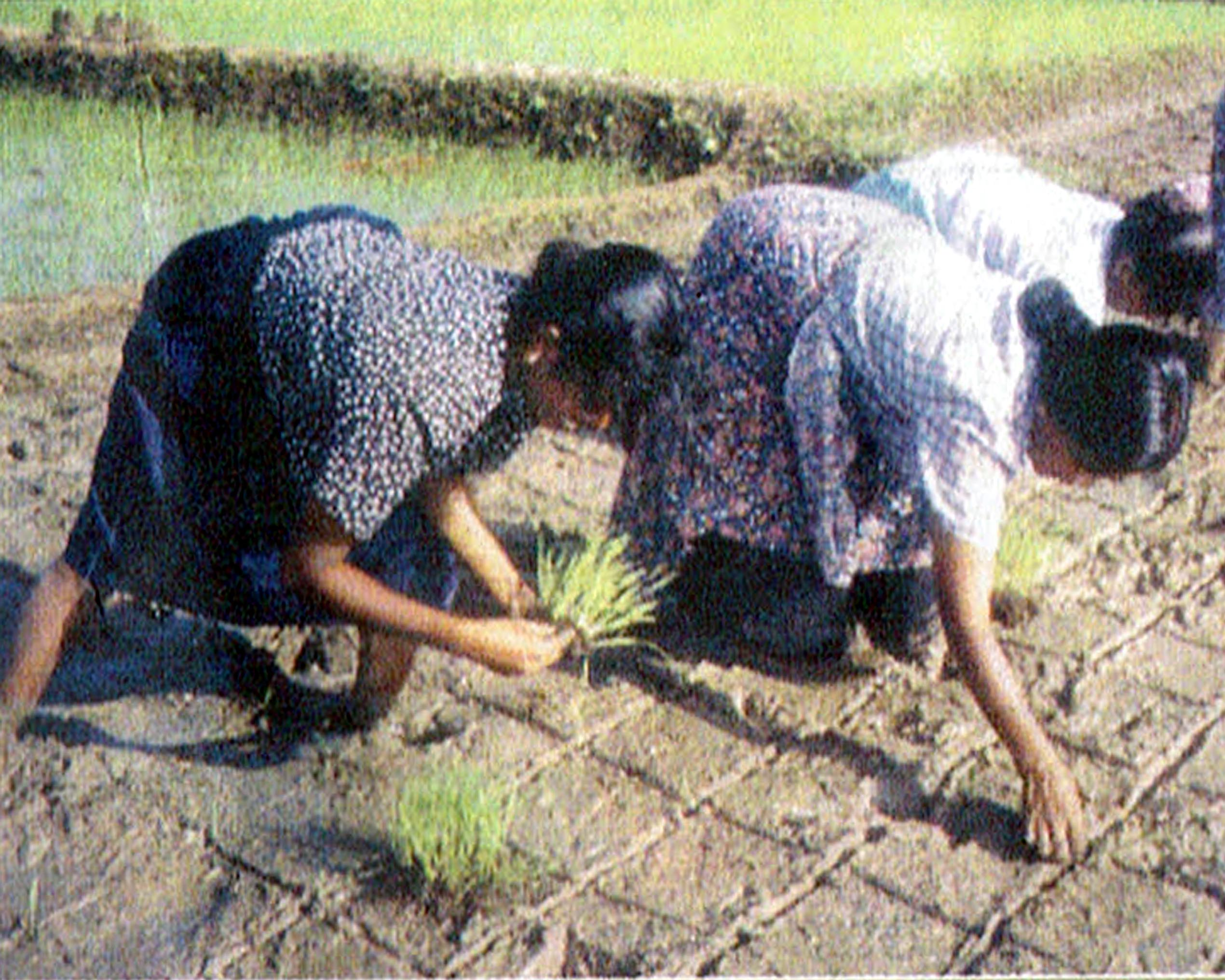
Women practicing System of Rice Intensification in a paddy field

Sabarmatee (born c. 1968) is an Indian conservationist and farmer living in Nayagarh district in the state of Odisha. She works with a non-governmental organization called Sambhav which was visualised by her father Padma Shri Prof Radhamohan that promotes organic farming and conservation of indigenous varieties besides doing many other activities. The achievements of Sabarmatee were recognised in 2018, when she received the Nari Shakti Puraskar and in 2020 with the Padma Shri.

== Career ==
Sabarmatee was born c. 1969. She lives in the Nayagarh district, near to Bhubaneswar in the state of Odisha in India. Her father Radha Mohan bought land in the 1980s that was a wasteland. Using organic farming techniques, father and daughter rejuvenated the land after three years. They then took on more land, building up to 90 acres. Amongst other things they grow clove bean, jack bean, sword bean and black rice. Together they set up a non-governmental organization (NGO) called Sambhav which promotes organic farming and seed exchanges. She left her job at Oxfam in 1993 in order to work full-time for Sambhav.

By 2021, Sambhav had collected 500 seed varieties for preservation. It holds training days and runs an annual Seed Festival. The NGO has partnered with a self-help group called Ma Saraswati to promote women's rights and environmental causes in local villages. It promotes the System of Rice Intensification (SRI) which is designed to maximise rice yields and according to Tiki also makes the labour process easier for women working in the paddy fields.

== Awards and recognition ==
The work of Sabarmatee was recognised in 2018, when she received the Nari Shakti Puraskar, India's highest civil award for women. In 2020, she received the Padma Shri alongside her father in recognition of their decades long promotion of conservation and organic farming. Minister Piyush Goyal said the two were "unsung heroes".

Additionally, she also received:

- Prerana Award- 2013
- Odisha Living Legend Award- 2015
- Sambhavi Puraskar - 2016
- Impact Women Award-2018
- Impact Leader of the year Award - 2022
- Honorary Doctorate ( DSc) by Orissa University of Agriculture and Technology
- Pratibha Samman- 2023
- Times Power Women Odisha Award - 2023

== Selected works ==
- Tiki, Sabarmatee; Lim, Liang Chun; Savann, Oeurm (2015). "SRI cultivates well-being for women". Farming Matters. 31 (4). Archived from the original on 2023-02-07.
- Tiki, Sabarmatee (2015). "SRI: A practice that transforms the lives of women". Leisa India. 17 (4): 18–20.
