= Mohale's Hoek District =

Coordinates: 30°10′S 27°40′E

Mohale's Hoek
- District
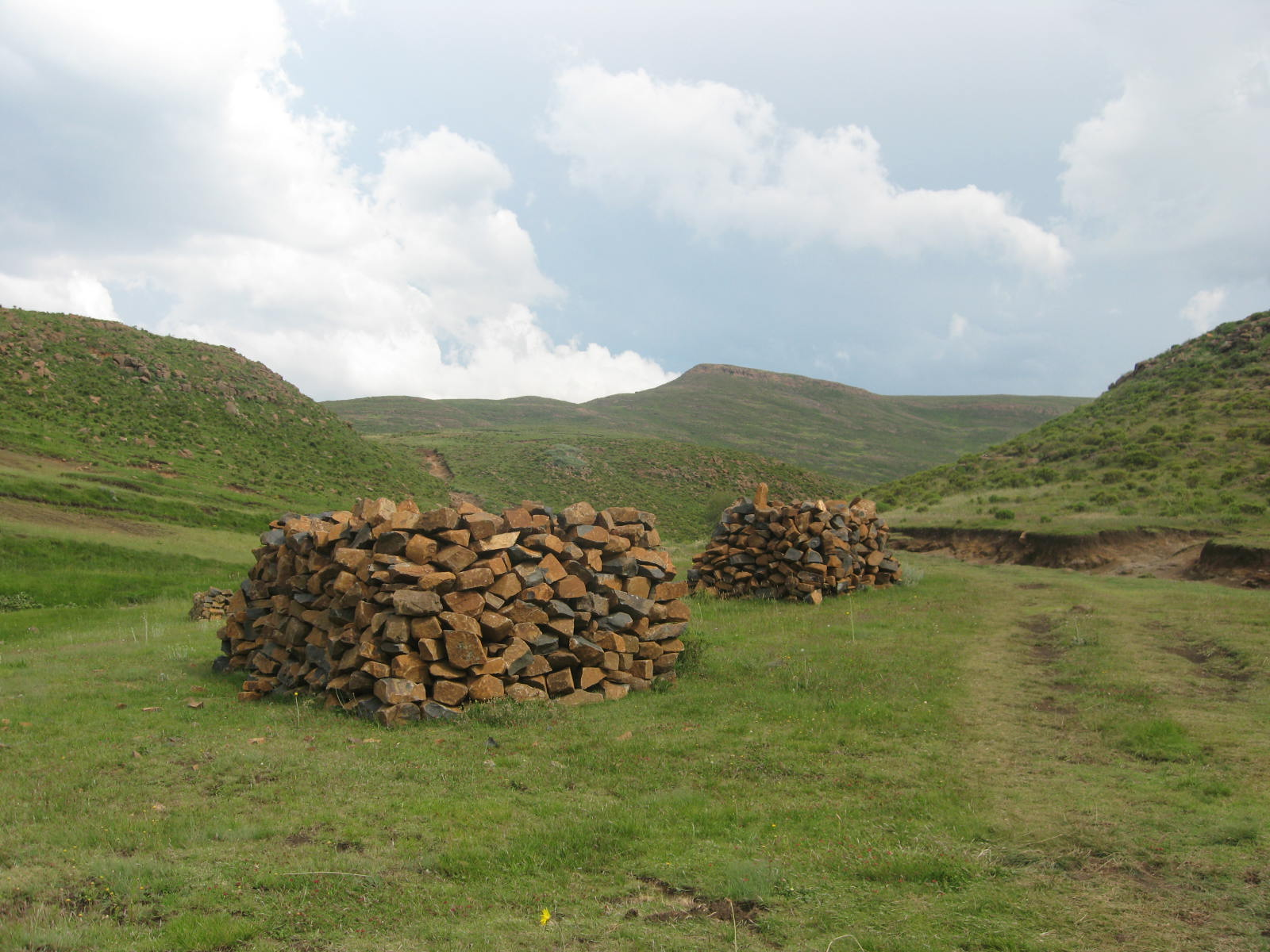
- Mount Moorosi

- Map of Lesotho with the district highlighted
- Country: Lesotho
- Capital: Mohale's Hoek

Area
  - Total: 3,530 km^{2} (1,360 sq mi)

Population (2016)
  - Total: 165,590
  - Density: 46.9/km^{2} (121/sq mi)
- Time zone: UTC+2 (CAT)
- Area code: +266
- HDI (2019): 0.518 low · 5th

Mohale's Hoek is a district of Lesotho. Mohale's Hoek is the capital city or camptown, and only town in the district. In the southwest, Mohale's Hoek borders on South Africa, while domestically, it borders on Mafeteng District in northwest, Maseru District in north, Thaba-Tseka District in northeast, Qacha's Nek District in east, and Quthing District in southeast.

As of 2006, the district had a population of 176,928 which was 9.43 per cent of the total population of the country. The total area of the district was 3,530 which was 11.63 per cent of the total area of the country. The density of population in the district was 50.00 per km^{2}. As of 2008, there were 42 per cent economically active people in the district. There were totally 111,150 employed people out of a total of 223,867 people in the district above 15 years of age. The total area planted in 2009 was 27,320 which formed 6.77 per cent of the total area planted in the country.

== Demographics ==
As of 2006, the district had a population of 176,928, 9.43 percent of the population of the country. The total area of the district was 3,530, 11.63 per cent of the country. The population density was 50.00 persons per square kilometre, compared to 62 for the country. There were eight constituencies and thirteen community councils in the district. As of 2006, 502 people tested HIV positive, 20.70 per cent of the HIV-positive persons in the country. 204 of these (20.40%) were men; 298 (20.90%) were women.

== Economy ==
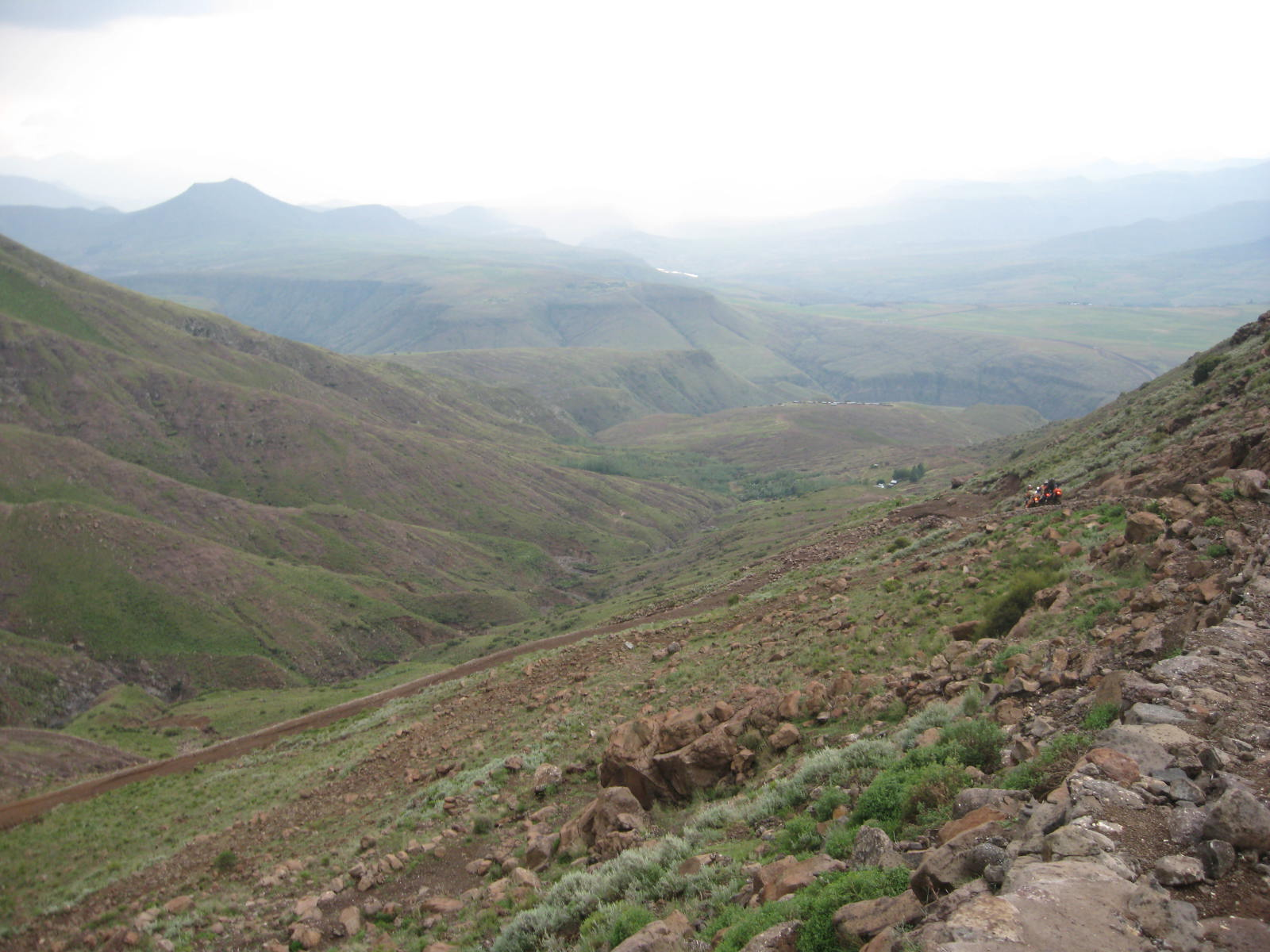
Mount Moroosi

As of 2008, there were 42 per cent economically active people in the district. There were totally 111,150 employed people out of a total of 223,867 people in the district above 15 years of age. The employed population in the age group of 6–14 years was 2,222 out of a total of 59,466 people in the district in the age group. The labour force participation stood at 192.00. The number of people involved in subsistence agriculture is 1,064 and the number of people in other sectors was 1,158. The number of unemployed people in the district was 31,464 and the unemployment rate was 67. The total area planted in 2009 was 27,320 which formed 6.77 per cent of the total area planted in the country. The total production was 7,807 tonnes, which was 5.18 per cent of the totals in the country. The major crop was maize, while wheat, sorghum, beans and peas were the other crops planted. The total production of maize was 4,960 tonnes, beans was 400 tonnes, sorghum was 113 tonnes, peas was 1,335 tonnes and wheat was 999 tonnes as of 2008. As of 2007, there were a total of 146 km (91 mi) of paved roads in the district, with 77 km (48 mi) paved roads and 69 km (43 mi) of unpaved roads.

== Geography ==
In the southwest, Mohale's Hoek borders on South Africa: mostly the Free State Province, but the southeastern border is with the Eastern Cape Province. Domestically, it borders on the following districts, namely, Mafeteng District in northwest, Maseru District in north, Thaba-Tseka District in northeast, Qacha's Nek District in east, and Quthing District in southeast. The Western districts of Lesotho has predominantly low land zone with an elevation of 1,500 m (4,900 ft) 1,800 m (5,900 ft) above the sea level. These lands are the major agricultural zones in the country. The average annual rainfall in the country is 100 cm (39 in), most of which is received during the rainy season of October to April. Though it rains during all the months of the year, groundwater is limited on account of run-offs. The region has a temperate climate on account of the elevation and is humid during most parts of the year. The temperature in low lands vary from 32 °C (90 °F) to −7 °C (19 °F) in the winter.

Climate data for Mohale's Hoek District
Month	Jan	Feb	Mar	Apr	May	Jun	Jul	Aug	Sep	Oct	Nov	Dec	Year
Mean daily maximum °C (°F)	27 (81)	27 (81)	25 (77)	21 (70)	19 (66)	16 (61)	16 (61)	20 (68)	22 (72)	26 (79)	27 (81)	28 (82)	23 (73)
Mean daily minimum °C (°F)	15 (59)	14 (57)	12 (54)	6 (43)	7 (45)	3 (37)	1 (34)	4 (39)	6 (43)	11 (52)	14 (57)	14 (57)	9 (48)
Average rainfall mm (inches)	167 (6.6)	134 (5.3)	112 (4.4)	62 (2.4)	30 (1.2)	60 (2.4)	1 (0.0)	4 (0.2)	0 (0)	25 (1.0)	74 (2.9)	141 (5.6)	811 (31.9)
Source 1:
Source 2:

== Administration ==
Constituencies of Mohale's Hoek District are Hloahloeng, Mekaling, Mohale's Hoek, Mpharane, Phamong and Taung. Community councils of Mohale's Hoek District are Khoelenya, Likhutloaneng, Mashaleng, Mootsinyane, Nkau, Phamong, Qabane, Qhobeng, Qobong, Seroto, Siloe, Teke and Thaba Mokhele. As per the 1968 Local Government Repeal Act - Development Committees Order No.9 of 1986, a District Development Committee (DDC) should have a set of Ward Development Committees (WDC) for each ward and Village Development Committees (VDC) under it. Each VDC has a set of seven elected members and the head would be an ex-officio member and chairman of the committee. The WDC is composed of twelve members elected from about VDCs, whose chairman would be and ex-officio member. The fifteen-membered DDC is elected by the members of WDC. When there are cases of more than one DDC, the chiefs would alternate in meetings. The district secretary co-ordinates the activities of the various committees. As per the Local Government Amendment Act 2004, the District Development Coordination Committee was established as the supreme body of district administration, under which all the district councils were branched. The urban and municipal councils were under each district council, which in turn had community councils under it. The Independent Electoral Commission (IEC) is responsible for the administration of the Local Government Elections. The nation's first local government elections were conducted in April 2005, while the most recent elections were held in October 2011. During these elections, 64 community councils, 11 urban councils and one municipal council were elected.
