= Qhobeng =

- Community Council
- Geographic Center of Community
- Coordinates: 29°55′39″S 27°50′36″E
- Country: Lesotho
- District: Mohale's Hoek District
- Elevation: 7,762 ft (2,366 m)

Population (2006)
  - Total: 3,083
- Time zone: UTC+2 (CAT)
- Coordinates computed from Lesotho Villages file.

Qhobeng is a community council located in the Mohale's Hoek District of Lesotho. Its population in 2006 was 3,083.

== Villages ==
The community of Qhobeng includes the villages of Ha Jane, Ha Khojane, Ha Kotsoana, Ha Lekitla, Ha Letsie, Ha Matabane, Ha Mothibi, Ha Nthamaha, Ha Ntjanyana, Ha Oetsi, Ha Polile, Ha Ralekhoasa, Ha Rantoetsi, Ha Sekhoko, Ha Sepolo, Ha Serokola, Ha Sibisibi, Ha Tau, Ha Teleki, Ha Tšiame, Habasisi (Malachabela), Ketanyane, Koting-sa-Matsa, Lekhalong, Letlapeng (Ha Mpache), Likoaeng, Majapereng, Matebeleng (Ha Mphekeleli), Nompilo, Poriki and Thaba-Sekoka.
