= Einar Texas Ljungberg =

Swedish politician (1880–1974)

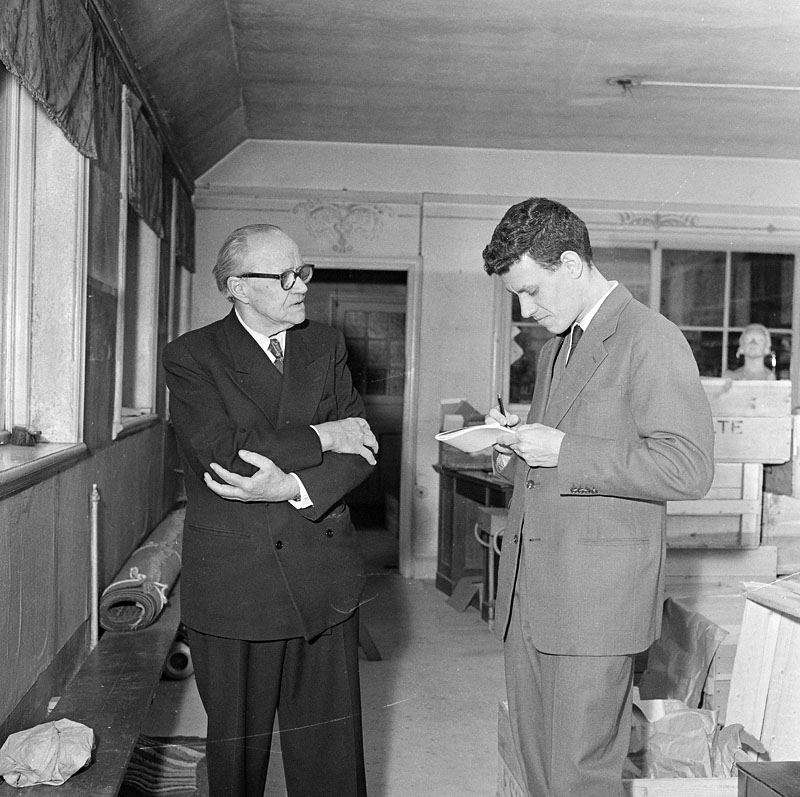
Texas (left) with Per Wästberg

Einar "Texas" Ljungberg (26 August 1880 - 6 December 1974) was a Swedish Socialist politician.

Einar Ljunberg joined the Social Democratic movement in Gothenburg in the early 1900s, and was active in the ranks of the Swedish Social Democratic Party. In 1909, he served almost one year in jail for treason, after having criticized the Swedish Monarchy and arguing for its replacement with a democratic republic.

After his release from prison, Ljungberg traveled to America and toured the United States speaking about socialism to Scandinavian immigrants there. Upon his return to Sweden, he was given the nickname "Texas" by his comrades.

Ljungberg was part of the left, pro-Bolshevik opposition within the Swedish Social Democratic Party, and, after the split of 1917, he joined the newly founded Swedish Communist Party. He took part in the third Congress of the Comintern (in Moscow, 1921).

After the rise of Stalinism in the Soviet Union, he left the Communist Party and returned to the Social Democratic Party.
