= Dord (instrument) =

Irish bronze horn

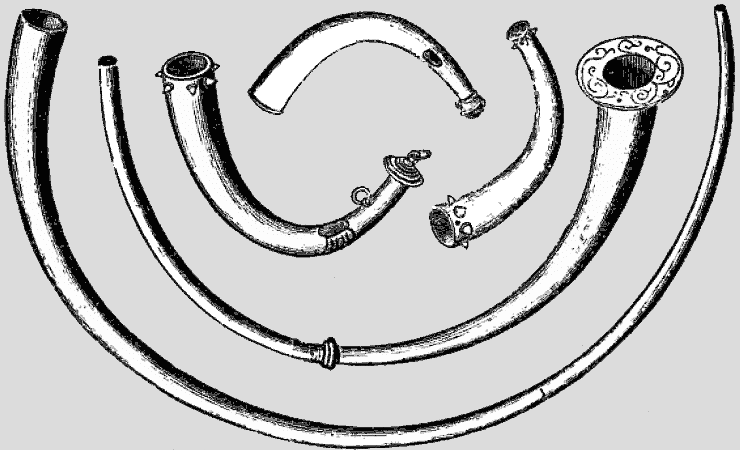
Bronze Age horns in the Irish Museum. The largest in this image is 7 1/2 feet (2.3 m) long, with the second largest at 6 feet (1.8 m).

The dord is a bronze horn native to Ireland, with excavated examples dating back as far as 1000 BC, during the Bronze Age. A number of original dords are known to exist, with some replicas also being built in the late 20th century.

Though the musical tradition of the dord has been lost, some modern performers like Rolf Harris and Alan Dargin believe that it was played in a manner similar to the didgeridoo (with circular breathing and shifts in timbre) and have applied that technique to modern fusion music. The Irish musician Simon O'Dwyer attempted to recreate a historically accurate dord in the late 20th century.

A number of sources associate a mythical hunting horn, called the Dord Fiann, with Fionn mac Cumhaill and the Fianna of Irish mythology.

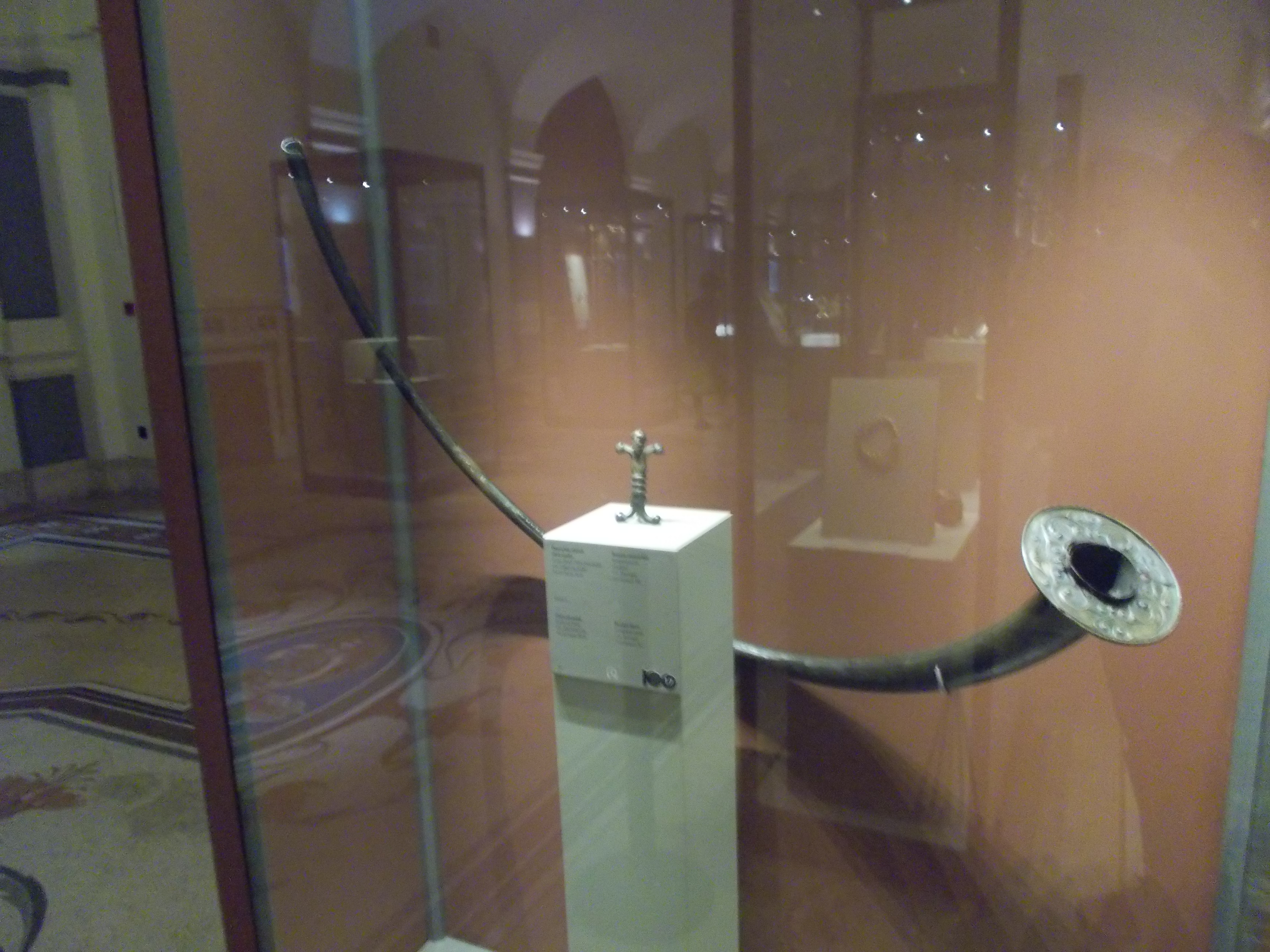
Trumpet found on the bottom of Loughnashade (Loch na Séad in Irish, 'Lake of Treasures').

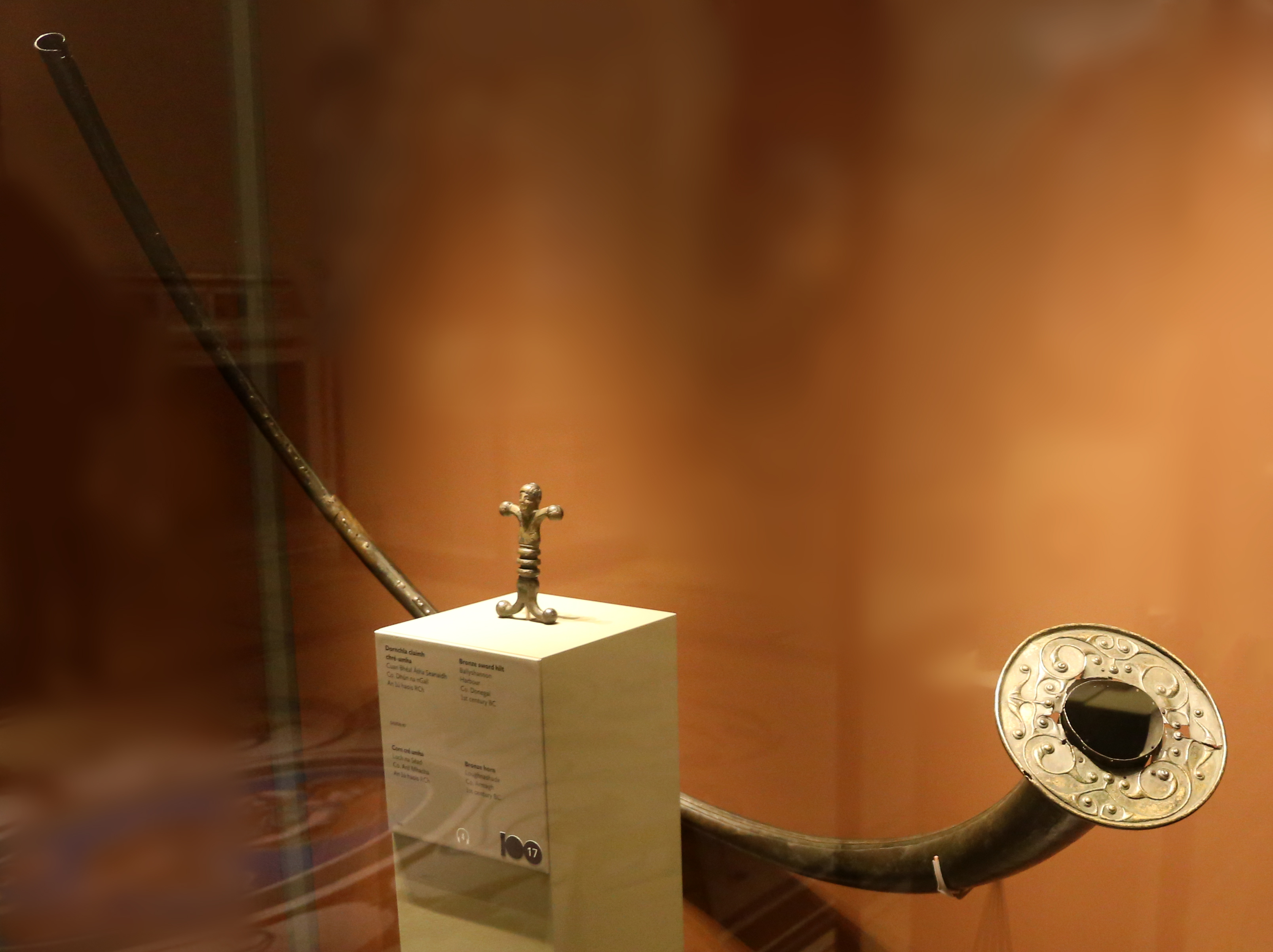
Loughnashade trumpet, 1st century B.C.

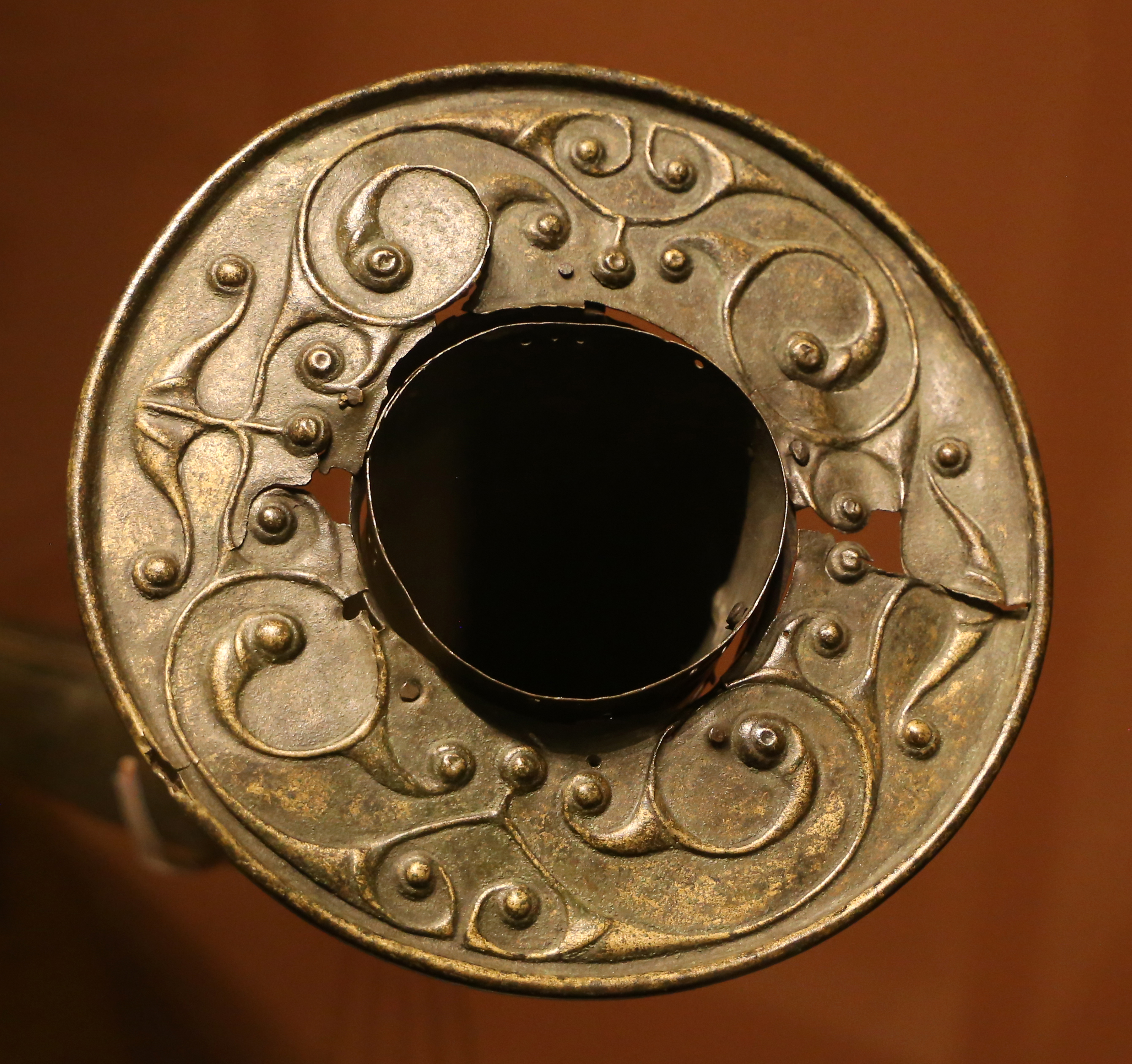
Tip of Loughnashade trumpet.

== See also ==
- Carnyx, another type of Celtic trumpet which has been revived
- Dowris Hoard, a Bronze Age find which contained a number of horns
