= Texas Terri and the Stiff Ones =

American punk music group

- Also known as: Texas Terri Bomb!
- Origin: Los Angeles
- Genres: Punk
- Years active: c. 1998–c. 2006
- Labels: Junk Records, TKO Records

Texas Terri and the Stiff Ones is a punk music group founded by Terri Laird and Don Cilurso, based in Los Angeles. The band's debut album, Eat Shit, was released in 1998. Following the departure of Cilurso, the band changed name to Texas Terri Bomb!.

== History ==
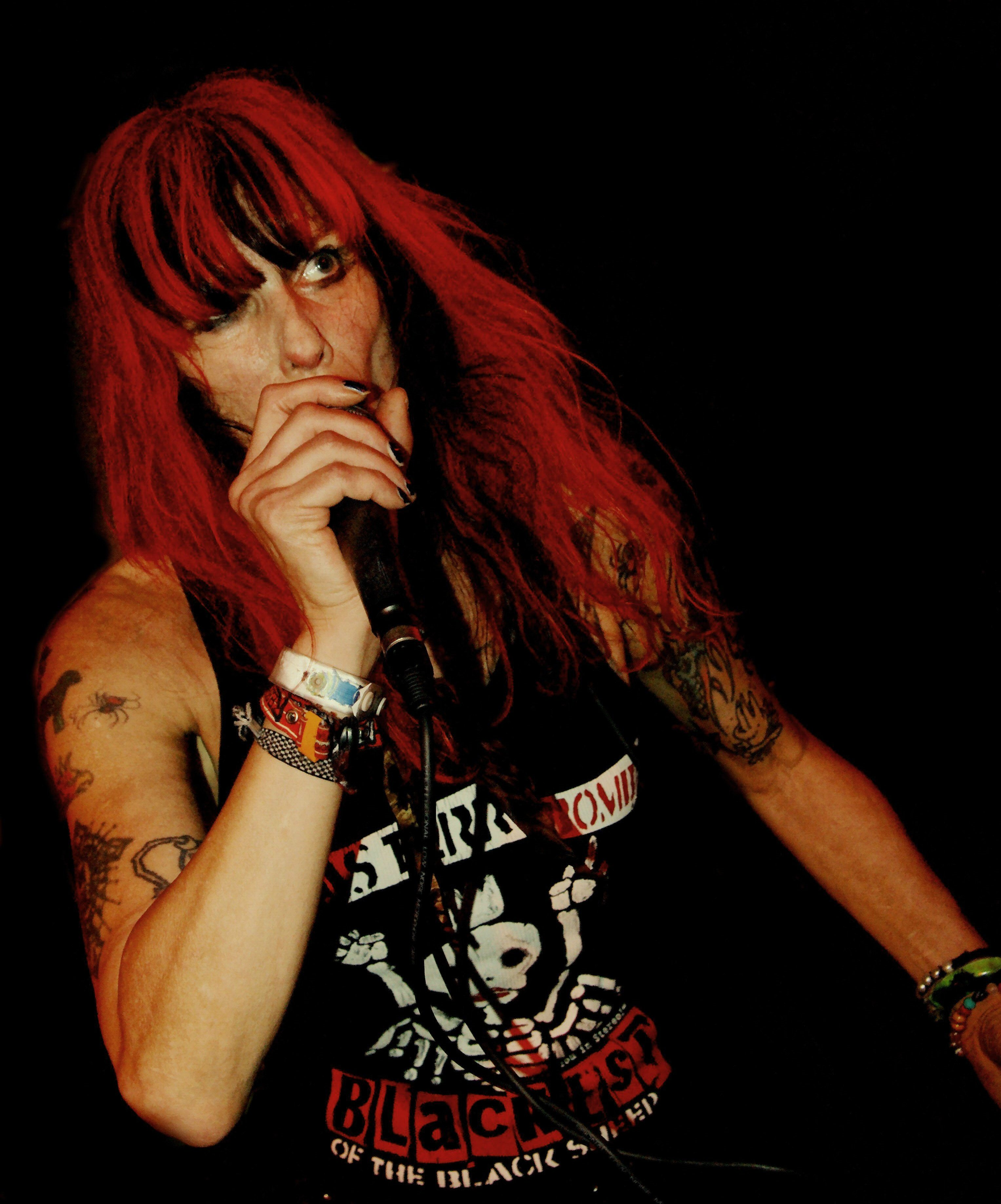
Laird performing with The Damned in 2012

Terri Laird, performing under the stage name Texas Terri, moved from Texas to Los Angeles c. 1985 and eventually formed the band Texas Terri and the Stiff Ones with Don Cilurso. In 1998 they released their debut album Eat Shit, with Laird on vocals, which according to Charles Spano of Allmusic featured "raunchy guitar riffs, nasty solos, and heavy rock & roll beats". The band became known for raucous live shows, and Terri (sometimes performing in various states of undress) as lead vocalist drew comparisons in the music media with Iggy Pop. The debut album was re-released a number of times, including in 2001 with an extra bonus track, and in 2006 as Eat Shit +4 with 4 extra tracks.

Following the departure of Cilurso, the band was renamed Texas Terri Bomb!, and in 2004 they released the album Your Lips...My Ass on TKO Records. A critical review in the Ox-fanzine magazine stated it is less "biting" then predecessor album Eat Shit, although Kenny Kaos of Maximum Rocknroll did review it positively, highlighting the "decent, female, growling vocals".

In 2012, Laird performed with former members of The Damned.

== Members ==
- Texas Terri (Terri Laird)
- Archie Frugone
- Brian Walsh
- Don Cilurso (past)

== Discography ==
As Texas Terri and the Stiff Ones:

- Eat Shit (1998)
- Eat Shit +1 (2001, reissue on Junk records)
- Eat Shit +4 (2006, reissue)

As Texas Terri Bomb!:

- Your Lips...My Ass (2004, TKO Records)
