= Annual Ukulele Festival =

Coordinates: 21.268441°N 157.818159°W

The Annual Ukulele Festival was held each July in Hawaii from 1971 to 2022. It was founded in 1971 by Roy Sakuma with the support of the Waikiki Department of Parks. The event drew large crowds to listen to free concerts by both amateur and top ukulele musicians.

== Origins ==
In 1970, Roy Sakuma was working as a groundskeeper for the Waikiki Department of Parks. At lunch one day, Sakuma and his colleagues envisioned an ukulele concert. With the support of his supervisor, Sakuma worked with the department and the Hawaii International Ukulele Club to put together the first festival at the Kapiolani Park Bandstand in Waikiki in 1971.

== Ukulele Festival Hawaii organization ==
Ukulele Festival Hawaii is a non-profit charitable organization established in 2004 by Roy and Kathy Sakuma. The organization’s mission is to bring laughter, love and hope to children and adults throughout Hawaii and the world through the music of the ukulele. Ukulele Festival Hawaii produces, promotes and arranges ukulele festivals free to the public, encourages interest in Hawaii’s arts and culture through education and scholarships, and promotes local and international interest in the ukulele as an instrument of virtuoso quality. The Ukulele Festival, the first and original ‘ukulele festival begun in 1971, is held every July in Kapiolani Park, O‘ahu.

== Key performers ==
In 1985, Sakuma went looking for the man who had created two ukulele jazz records 25 years earlier that had become classics to the Hawaiian ukulele players, How About Uke? and 50th State Jazz. Sakuma located Lyle Ritz in California and convinced him to pick up the ukulele again and come play at the festival that year. Ritz then moved to Hawaii and performed at many of the following festivals as well.

In 1994, James Ingram, the Grammy Award-winning pop artist, met Sakuma while they were exercising on the tracks of the University of Hawaii. Ten years later the two composed “Come and Join Us” which has become the theme song for Ukulele Festival Hawaii organization. The 2004 Hawaii Music Awards awarded the “Single of the Year" to the composition.

== Master of Ceremonies ==
Danny Kaleikini served as the festival’s official emcee for over 45 years, first appearing in 1972. Kaleikini often serves as emcee at the other ukulele festivals as well.

== Festival Dates and Headliners ==
Festival	Date	Known Performers
15th	27 July 1985	Lyle Ritz
16th	July 1986	Lyle Ritz
17th	July 1987	Lyle Ritz
18th	July 1988	Lyle Ritz
24th	July 1994	James Ingram
26th	July 1996	Jim Beloff
27th	July 27, 1997	James Ingram, Lyle Ritz and his daughter Emily, The Langley Ukulele Ensemble
30th	July 2000	James Ingram
31st	July 29, 2001	Jake Shimabukuro
34th	July 25, 2004	James Ingram, Troy Fernandez, Canadian virtuoso James Hill, Japan's Yuji Igarashi, the Keale Ohana and Daniel Ho.
36th	July 30, 2006	Danny Kaleikini, James Hill, Ohta-San
37th	July 22, 2007	Jake Shimabukuro, Holunape and Ohta-San
38th	July 27, 2008	Herb Ohta, Sr. (Ohta-san), Kelly Boy Delima, Michael Keale, Paula Fuga, Bryan Tolentino, Canadian James Hill played ukulele with chopsticks.
39th	July 19, 2009	Danny Kaleikini, Taimane Gardner, Holunape, Natalie Ai Kamauu, Langley Ukulele Ensemble, Ken Makuakane, Ohata-san, Palolo, Bill Tapia, Sunset Strummers, Yuji Igarashi & “Kolohe” Imamura, George Matsushita, LeaLea Ukulele Garden, Ukulele 4 Ladies
40th	July 18, 2010	Jake Shimabukuro
41st	July 29, 2011	Jake Shimabukuro, Aldrine Guerrero, Kalei Gamiao
42nd	July 22, 2012	
43rd	July 21, 2013	Jake Shimabukuro, Ohta San, Herb Ohta, Jr., Dukes of Surf, Paula Fuga
50th	18 July 2021	TBD; no 2020 festival.
