= Live (Jake Shimabukuro album) =

Live album by Jake Shimabukuro
- Released: April 14, 2009
- Label: Hitchhike Records

Jake Shimabukuro chronology
My Life (2007)	Live (2009)	Peace Love Ukulele (2011)

Live is Jake Shimabukuro's 2009 solo album. It was released in April 2009, and consists of live in-concert performances from various venues around the world, including New York, Chicago, Japan, and Hawaii.

Live peaked at number 5 in Billboard's Top World Music Albums in 2009 and 2010. The album won the 2010 Na Hoku Hanohano Award for Instrumental Album of the Year, and also garnered Shimabukuro the award for Favorite Entertainer of the Year. In addition, it won the 2010 Hawaii Music Award for Best Ukulele Album.

== Critical reception ==
AllMusic noted that "Shimabukuro is a monster musician and boldly takes the ukulele where no ukulele has ever gone before, dazzling listeners with his blinding speed, melodic invention, and open-ended improvisations of remarkable virtuosity. Before Shimabukuro, the idea of spending an evening listing to a solo ukulele player was probably most people's idea of hell, but the 17 solo efforts here never bore. They show Shimabukuro's range and his humor as well."

== Track listing ==
All tracks composed by Jake Shimabukuro except where noted.

1. "Trapped"
2. "Piano-Forte"
3. "Bach Two-Part Invention No. 4 in D Minor" (Johann Sebastian Bach)
4. "Me & Shirley T."
5. "Spain" (Chick Corea)
6. "Five Dollars Unleaded"
7. "Let's Dance: Prelude"
8. "Let's Dance"
9. "Thriller" (Rod Temperton)
10. "Orange World"
11. "Wes on Four"
12. "Sakura Sakura" (Traditional Japanese)
13. "Dragon"
14. "Yeah"
15. "From Ukulele Disco to Youtube"
16. "While My Guitar Gently Weeps" (George Harrison)
17. "3rd Stream"
18. "Blue Roses Falling"
