= Sunday Morning (album) =

Studio album by Jake Shimabukuro
- Released: October 22, 2002
- Label: Hitchhike Records

Jake Shimabukuro chronology
Sunday Morning (2002)	Crosscurrent (2003)

Professional ratings
Review scores
Source	Rating
AllMusic	4.5/5 stars

Sunday Morning is ukulele virtuoso Jake Shimabukuro's first full-length solo album. It was released in the U.S. in October 2002 by Four Strings Productions / Hitchhike Records. The album was released in Japan the following year on August 12, 2003 by Sony Music Distribution.

The album features the ukulele playing many different genres, including jazz, rock, heavy metal, and classical, and consists of five cover songs and five original compositions by Shimabukuro.

Sunday Morning received the 2003 Na Hoku Hanohano Award for Instrumental Album of the Year, and the 2003 Hawaii Music Award for Instrumental Hawaiian Album of the Year. The general public also voted Jake Shimabukuro Favorite Entertainer of the Year at the 2003 Na Hoku Hanohano Awards for this album.

AllMusic summarized its review of Sunday Morning by stating, "The range of techniques, the range of genres, the range of sonic possibilities ... are all stunning. This album is a must."

== Track listing ==
All tracks composed by Jake Shimabukuro except where noted.

1. "Sand Channel"
2. "Love Is ..."
3. "Selections from Caprice No. 24" (Paganini)
4. "Sunday Morning"
5. "My Heart Will Go On" (Will Jennings)
6. "Toastmaker's Revenge"
7. "Sleep Walk" (Santo & Johnny Farina)
8. "Let's Dance"
9. "Close To You" (Burt Bacharach)
10. "Crazy G" (Traditional) [Live]
