= Dragon (Jake Shimabukuro album) =

Studio album by Jake Shimabukuro
- Released: October 4, 2005
- Label: Hitchhike Records

Jake Shimabukuro chronology
Walking Down Rainhill (2004)	Dragon (2005)	Gently Weeps (2006)

Professional ratings
Review scores
Source	Rating
AllMusic	3.5/5 stars

Dragon is Jake Shimabukuro's fourth U.S. solo album. It was released in October 2005.

The album peaked at #5 on Billboard's Top World Music Albums in 2005. It garnered Shimabukuro the Favorite Entertainer of the Year award at the 2006 Na Hoku Hanohano Awards, and Best Rock Album at the 2006 Hawaii Music Awards.

The AllMusic review summarized Dragon by saying, "Aside from his versatile playing, the collection's strength lies in its unpredictability from track to track. ... You can feel the island breezes here and there, but Shimabukuro's approach to his native instrument is equally at home on the gritty streets of Manhattan."

== Track listing ==
All tracks composed by Jake Shimabukuro except where noted.

1. "Shake It Up!" – 2:59
2. "Dragon" – 4:06
3. "Circle of Friends" – 3:15
4. "Me and Shirley T." – 3:39
5. "Floaters" – 2:21
6. "3rd Stream" – 5:08
7. "Touch" – 3:34
8. "En Aranjuez Con Tu Amor" (Joaquín Rodrigo) – 5:03
9. "Toastmanland" – 3:35
10. "Making A Perfect Yesterday" – 2:24
11. "Looking Back" – 5:19
12. "With U Always" – 3:45

== Personnel ==
- Judy Barrett – violin
- Karen Bechtel – cello, string quartet
- Matt Catingub – conductor, string arrangements, string conductor
- Karen Fujimoto – cello
- Claire Hazzard – violin, string quartet
- Ignace Jang – violin
- Hideo Oida – photography
- Noel Okimoto – drums, rhythm arrangements
- Daniel Pardo - flute
- Takaoki Saito – engineer, mixing
- Jake Shimabukuro – acoustic guitar, piano, electric guitar, keyboards, programming, ukulele, producer, liner notes, rhythm arrangements, drum loop
- Dean Taba – bass, rhythm arrangements
- Preston Terada – graphic design
- Anna Womack – viola, string quartet
- Sandra Wong – viola
- Hung Wu – violin, string quartet

== Charts ==
Chart (2005)	Peak position
US World Albums (Billboard)	5
