= Walking Down Rainhill =

Studio album by Jake Shimabukuro
- Released: August 24, 2004
- Label: Hitchhike Records

Jake Shimabukuro chronology
| Crosscurrent (2003) | Walking Down Rainhill (2004) | Dragon (2005) |

Walking Down Rainhill is ukulele artist Jake Shimabukuro's third U.S. solo album. It was released on August 24, 2004 on the Hitchhike Records label. In Japan, the album was released on June 28, 2004 by Sony/Epic.

The album won the 2005 Na Hoku Hanohano Award for Instrumental Album of the Year, and the 2005 Hawaii Music Award for Best Ukulele Album.

== Track listing ==
All tracks composed by Jake Shimabukuro except where noted

1. "Heartbeat"
2. "Rainbow"
3. "Walking Down Rainhill"
4. "Grandma's Groove"
5. "6 in the Morning"
6. "Toastman's Wave"
7. "Blue Roses Falling"
8. "Hikaru Kaigara" (Masayoshi Yamazaki)
9. "Wes on Four"
10. "While My Guitar Gently Weeps" (George Harrison)
11. "Equator"
12. "Heartbeat" – reprise
