= Crosscurrent (Jake Shimabukuro album) =

Studio album by Jake Shimabukuro
- Released: August 26, 2003
- Label: Hitchhike Records

Jake Shimabukuro chronology
Sunday Morning (2002)	Crosscurrent (2003)	Walking Down Rainhill (2004)

Crosscurrent is ukulele artist Jake Shimabukuro's second U.S. solo album. It was released in August 2003.

The album won the 2004 Na Hoku Hanohano Award for Instrumental Album of the Year. It also won the 2004 Hawaii Music Awards for Album of the Year, and Instrumental Hawaiian Album of the Year.

== Track listing ==
All tracks composed by Jake Shimabukuro except where noted

1. "Crosscurrent"
2. "Toastman's Dilemma"
3. "Fragile" (Sting)
4. "I've Been Thinking"
5. "Wish On My Star"
6. "Spain" (Chick Corea)
7. "Mrs. Robinson" (Paul Simon)
8. "Skyline"
9. "Orange World"
10. "When You're Down"
11. "Beat Of My Heart"
12. "Hana" (Shoukichi Kina)
