= Flea Market Music =

American music publisher

Flea Market Music, Inc.
- Company type: Private Company
- Industry: Publishing
- Founded: 1992
- Key people: Jim Beloff, Liz Beloff
- Products: Music books and CDs
- Website: Flea Market Music

Flea Market Music is an American company which publishes and sells ukulele-related books and music.

== History ==
Flea Market Music was founded in 1992 by Jim Beloff and his wife, Liz Beloff, to publish music books for the ukulele community. A guitarist for many years, Jim bought a used Martin ukulele at a flea market and later left his job with Billboard Magazine to make a full-time career of promoting the ukulele. The company name combines the meaning of ukulele in Hawaiian, 'jumping flea', and the purchase of Beloff's first ukulele at the Rose Bowl Flea Market.

Flea Market Music has published a wide variety of ukulele instructional books (distributed by the Hal Leonard Corporation) and DVDs as well as CDs of recorded ukulele music. As of May 2002, over 600,000 books have been sold. The company's products are sold through retail and online.

Beloff and his wife, Liz, perform and give workshops at festivals and other musical events to promote ukuleles and the Flea Market Music products. In 2014 they were guests on a WNPR radio show with ukulelist Jake Shimabukuro, discussing ukuleles and ukulele music.

== Books ==
- Jumpin' Jim's Ukulele Favorites, Flea Market Music, Inc., (1992) ISBN 978-0-7935-2050-3
- Jumpin' Jim's Ukulele Tips 'N' Tunes: A Beginner's Method & Songbook, Flea Market Music, Inc., (1994) ISBN 978-0-7935-3377-0
- Jumpin' Jim's Ukulele Gems, Flea Market Music, Inc. (1995) ISBN 978-0-7935-5796-7
- Jumpin' Jim's Ukulele Christmas, Flea Market Music, Inc. (1998) ISBN 978-0-7935-9486-3
- Jumpin' Jim's Gone Hawaiian, Flea Market Music, Inc., (1999) ISBN 978-0-634-00934-1
- Jumpin' Jim's '60s Uke-In, Flea Market Music, Inc. (1999) ISBN 978-0-634-00631-9
- Jumpin' Jim's Camp Ukulele, Flea Market Music, Inc. (2000) ISBN 978-0-634-01850-3
- Jumpin' Jim's Ukulele Beach Party, Flea Market Music, Inc., (2001) ISBN 978-0-634-03425-1
- Jumpin' Jim's Ukulele Masters: Lyle Ritz, Flea Market Music, Inc. (2001) ISBN 978-0-634-02764-2
- Jumpin' Jim's Ukulele Masters: Lyle Ritz Solos: 15 Chord Solos Arranged by the Ukulele Jazz Master, Flea Market Music, Inc. (2002) ISBN 978-0-634-04658-2
- Jumpin' Jim's Ukulele Masters: Herb Ohta, Flea Market Music, Inc., (2002) ISBN 978-0-634-03863-1
- Jumpin' Jim's Ukulele Spirit, Flea Market Music, Inc. (2002) ISBN 978-0-634-04618-6
- Jumpin' Jim's Gone Hollywood, Flea Market Music, Inc. (2003) ISBN 978-0-634-06218-6
- The Ukulele: A Visual History, Backbeat Books, (2d Ed 2003) ISBN 978-0-87930-758-5
- Jumpin' Jim's Ukulele Masters: John King, The Classical Ukulele, Flea Market Music, Inc. (2004) ISBN 0-634-07979-4
- Jumpin' Jim's Ukulele Island, Flea Market Music, Inc. (2004) ISBN 978-0-634-07980-1
- Jumpin' Jim's The Bari Best, Flea Market Music, Inc. (2005) ISBN 978-1-4234-0706-5
- Jumpin' Jim's Ukulele Country, Flea Market Music, Inc., (2005) ISBN 978-1-4234-0122-3
- Jumpin' Jim's Happy Holidays, Flea Market Music, Inc. (2006) ISBN 978-1-4234-2249-5
- Ukulele Fretboard Roadmaps, Fred Sokolow/Jim Beloff, Hal Leonard Corporation, (2006) ISBN 978-1-4234-0041-7
- Jumpin' Jim's Ukulele Masters: Lyle Lite: 16 Easy Chord Solos Arranged by Ukulele Jazz Master Lyle Ritz, Flea Market Music, Inc. (2008) ISBN 978-1-4234-3781-9
- Blues Ukulele, arr. by Fred Sokolow, Flea Market Music, Inc. (2008) ISBN 978-1-4234-6572-0
- Elvis Presley for Ukulele, Hal Leonard Corporation (2009) ISBN 978-1-4234-6556-0
- Disney Songs For Ukulele, Hal Leonard Corporation, (2010) ISBN 978-1-4234-9560-4
- Bluegrass Ukulele, arr. by Fred Sokolow, Flea Market Music, Inc. (2010) ISBN 978-1-4234-9316-7
- The Daily Ukulele, Hal Leonard Corporation and Flea Market Music, Inc, (2010) ISBN 978-1-4234-7775-4 (Also available in smaller size)
- Rodgers & Hammerstein For Ukulele, Hal Leonard Corporation (2011) ISBN 978-1-61780-386-4
- From Lute To Uke, arr. by Tony Mizen, Flea Market Music, Inc. (2011) ISBN 978-1-4584-0651-4
- Broadway Classics For Ukulele, Hal Leonard Corporation (2012) ISBN 978-1-4584-1565-3
- The Baroque Ukulele, arr. by Tony Mizen, Flea Market Music, Inc. (2012) ISBN 978-1-4768-1520-6
- The Daily Ukulele Leap Year Edition, Hal Leonard Corporation and Flea Market Music, (2012) ISBN 978-1-4584-8268-6
- The Daily Ukulele: Baritone Edition, Hal Leonard Corporation and Flea Market Music, (2013) ISBN 978-1-4803-5200-1
- Jazzing Up The Ukulele, Fred Sokolow (2015) ISBN 978-1-4803-9528-2
- The Romantic Ukulele, Tony Mizen, Flea Market Music, (2015) ISBN 978-1-4950-2254-8

== CDs ==
- Jim Beloff, Jim's Dog Has Fleas, Flea Market Music,1993
- Legends Of Ukulele, (producer), Rhino Records 1998
- Jim Beloff For The Love Of Uke, Flea Market Music,1998
- Lyle Ritz, Herb Ohta: A Night Of Ukulele Jazz, (producer) Flea Market Music 2001
- Various Artists, The Finer Things, The Songs Of Herb Ohta & Jim Beloff, Flea Market Music, 2004
- Lyle Ritz, No Frills, (producer) Flea Market Music 2006
- Various Artists, Paradise Lost & Found, Flea Market Music, 2007
- Liz & Jim Beloff, Rare Air, Flea Market Music, 2009
- Dreams I Left In Pockets: 33 Songs By Jim Beloff 2 CD set, 2014 (FMM-1009)

== DVD ==
- The Joy of Uke - Volume 1, Homespun Tapes 1998
- The Joy of Uke - Volume 2: Moving Beyond the Basics, Homespun Tapes, 2003 ISBN 978-1-932537-27-7
- Lyle's Style: Ukulele Master Lyle Ritz Shares A Lifetime Of Performance Techniques, (producer) Flea Market Music 2009
- Jumpin' Jim's Ukulele Workshop, Homespun, 2011, ASIN: B0057CONAO
