= My Life (Jake Shimabukuro album) =

EP by Jake Shimabukuro
- Released: September 4, 2007
- Label: Hitchhike Records

Jake Shimabukuro chronology
Gently Weeps (2006)	My Life (2007)	Live (2009)

My Life is a 2007 EP by ukulele artist Jake Shimabukuro, released in the U.S. on September 4, 2007, by Hitchhike Records. It was released in Japan on July 18, 2007, by Epic/Sony.

The album peaked at number 13 on the Top World Music Albums chart. It won the 2008 Hawaii Music Award for Best Ukulele Album.

== Critical reception ==
AllMusic summed up their review as follows: "... On this brief but completely charming EP ... [Shimabukuro] takes six songs by a wide variety of artists (Judy Garland, Cyndi Lauper, two by the Beatles, Sarah McLachlan, even Led Zeppelin) and gives them quiet, tasteful arrangements that draw much more attention to his musicianship and to the songs themselves than they do to the fact that he's playing a ukulele."

== Track listing ==
1. "Time After Time" 3:06 (written by Rob Hyman and Cyndi Lauper); (players: ukulele Jake Shimabukuro, guitar Bruce Shimabukuro, percussion Tamao Fujii)
2. "Going to California" 4:05 (Jimmy Page and Robert Plant)
3. "In My Life" 3:30 (Lennon & McCartney)
4. "Somewhere Over the Rainbow" 4:14 (Harold Arlen & E. Y. Harburg)
5. "Here, There and Everywhere" 3:09 (Lennon & McCartney)
6. "Ice Cream" 4:00 (Sarah McLachlan)
