= Gently Weeps =

Studio album by Jake Shimabukuro
- Released: September 19, 2006
- Label: Hitchhike Records

Jake Shimabukuro chronology
Dragon (2005)	Gently Weeps (2006)	My Life (2007)

Gently Weeps is the fifth U.S. solo album by ukulele artist Jake Shimabukuro, released in September 2006 on the Hitchhike Records label. In Japan the album was released on June 19, 2006 by Sony Music Distribution, with 17 tracks, many of which differed from the U.S. release, and additional bonus tracks on a CD-ROM.

== Awards and reviews ==
Gently Weeps peaked at #2 on Billboard's Top World Music Albums in 2006. The album won the 2007 Na Hoku Hanohano Award for Instrumental Album of the Year.

AllMusic's review of Gently Weeps noted that:

Every so often a musician comes along who completely reimagines the possibilities of a given instrument.... Jake Shimabukuro has given the ukulele a new respect altogether .... What this fourth-generation Japanese-American musician from Hawaii has done is legitimize his chosen instrument, and several albums into his career, he continues to push it forward. .... Shimabukuro, who performs most of the album solo, ... wrings melody and harmony lines out of the small stringed instrument that the listener probably never imagined it could deliver. He finds within his axe a range of tones and grooves ... and so seamlessly adapts it to any style or song that you might just forget that this instrument isn't supposed to sound cool at all. You might also forget that often only one person is making all of this sound. Alternating stunning original works with covers (not since ... Hendrix has anyone reworked "The Star-Spangled Banner" so thoroughly), Shimabukuro delivers a listening experience that both delights and surprises.

John Diliberto's review of the album included the following synopsis:

Jake Shimabukuro sets the tone with the lead-off track from which he takes the album's title, George Harrison's "While My Guitar Gently Weeps", unfolding the vulnerable undertow of Harrison's epic lament. A string of covers follows, as Shimabukuro touches the serene with Schubert's "Ave Maria," evokes a Japanese koto on a Zen-like version of "Sakura", and turns "The Star-Spangled Banner" into a lament. But Shimabukuro's original tunes are just as full of plucked nuance, especially "Heartbeat Dragon," where he uses a slight delay to create a quietly joyful Celtic air. However, don't think it's all wistful melancholy. Shimabukuro whips it out on original tracks like "Let's Dance," alternating hard rhythmic chops with flamenco-like strums. His take on Erroll Garner's "Misty" is a little jive, though I'm sure the hot jazz middle-section pumps the crowds up. Chick Corea's "Spain" fares much better and still scores high on the flash quotient. You just can't keep a fret-burner down, even when his fretboard is toy-sized. You can't keep the Hawaiian out either. Its gentle sway turns up on the sweetly laconic "Angel." A few bonus tracks of generic fusion at the end detract from the solo purity and intimate mood that Shimabukuro creates, but Gently Weeps is a joy until then.

== Track listing ==
All tracks composed by Jake Shimabukuro except where noted.

1. "While My Guitar Gently Weeps" (George Harrison) - 4:07
2. "Ave Maria" (Franz Schubert) - 3:02
3. "Wish On My Star" - 3:49
4. "Sakura" (Traditional Japanese folk song) - 2:56
5. "The Star-Spangled Banner" (John Stafford Smith) - 2:12
6. "Let's Dance" - 2:46
7. "Misty" (Johnny Burke, Erroll Garner) - 3:38
8. "Spain" (Chick Corea) - 2:53
9. "Heartbeat/Dragon" - 4:00
10. "Blue Roses Falling" - 3:40
11. "Grandma's Groove" - 2:11
12. "Breathe" - 3:43

=== Bonus tracks ===
1. "Angel" - 4:03
2. "Lazy Jane" - 3:57
3. "Hula Girl" (Theme song of the film Hula Girls) - 3:44
4. "Beyond The Break" (Music for the TV network THE N "Beyond the Break") - 3:03
5. "Wish On My Star" (vocal version for the movie Hula Girls) - 3:31

== Personnel ==
=== Musical ===
- Jake Shimabukuro - ukulele, producer
- Michael Grande - keyboards
- Bobby Ingano - guitar (steel)
- Yasuharu Nakanishi - piano
- Takashi Nishiumi - guitar
- Hiroyuki Noritake - drums
- Jack Ofoia - bass guitar, guitar
- Akira Okazawa - bass guitar
- Noel Okimoto - drums
- Jon F. Porlas, Jr. - percussion
- Vernon Sakata - guitar (electric)
- Dean Taba - bass guitar
- Darin Enomoto - drums

=== Technical ===
- Mac McAnally - producer
- Alan Schulman - engineer
- Chris Stone - engineer
- Takaoki Saito - engineer
