= Grand Ukulele =

Studio album by Jake Shimabukuro
- Released: October 2, 2012
- Label: Hitchhike Records

Jake Shimabukuro chronology
Peace Love Ukulele (2011)	Grand Ukulele (2012)	Travels (2015)

Grand Ukulele is Jake Shimabukuro's 2012 album, released in October 2012. The album was produced by Alan Parsons, with orchestrations done by Kip Winger.

Grand Ukulele features a 29-piece orchestra and a rhythm section, with the ukulele as solo instrument, and was recorded in live studio sessions with no over-dubbing. The album reached number 2 on Billboard's Top World Music Albums in 2012 and 2013.

The styles featured on the album range from, and sometimes merge: classical, blues, flamenco, mandolin, rockabilly, surf rock, and music box.

== Inception ==
Producer/engineer Alan Parsons attended Shimabukuro's concert near where Parsons lives in Santa Barbara, and asked the concert promoter to put him in touch. They had dinner, and Parsons suggested working together on a project.

Parsons helped Shimabukuro expand his sound, bringing in a 29-piece orchestra and a big-name rhythm section, including drummer Simon Phillips (The Who, Toto), bassist Randy Tico, and Kip Winger (Winger, Alice Cooper), who helped with the orchestration.

Shimabukuro commented afterwards: "The best thing was that, even with all those people, we recorded everything live with no overdubs. It was great, tracking live with an orchestra and a rhythm section. We picked up on each other’s subtle emotional cues – you could feel everyone breathing together. It was like the old days of recording – when everyone tracked together – there’s a certain magic that happens."

== Track listing ==
All tracks composed by Jake Shimabukuro except where noted

1. "Ukulele Five-O"
2. "Rolling In The Deep" (Adele / Paul Epworth)
3. "Gentlemandolin"
4. "More Ukulele"
5. "Missing Three"
6. "Music Box"
7. "143"
8. "Over The Rainbow" (Harold Arlen)
9. "Island Fever Blues"
10. "Fields Of Gold" (Sting)
11. "Gone Fishing"
12. "Akaka Falls" (Helen Parker)

== Charts ==
Chart (2015)	Peak position
US World Albums (Billboard)	2
US Heatseekers Albums (Billboard)	22
