= Peace Love Ukulele =

Studio album by Jake Shimabukuro
- Released: January 4, 2011
- Label: Hitchhike Records

Jake Shimabukuro chronology
Live (2009)	Peace Love Ukulele (2011)	Grand Ukulele (2012)

Peace Love Ukulele is Jake Shimabukuro's 2011 solo album. It was released in January 2011, and reached #1 in Billboard's Top World Music Albums in 2011 and 2012.

In Hawaii, Peace Love Ukulele won the 2012 Na Hoku Hanohano Award for Instrumental Album of the Year, and also garnered Shimabukuro the Na Hoku Hanohano award for Favorite Entertainer of the Year.

AllMusic praised Shimabukuro's covers of "While My Guitar Gently Weeps" and "Bohemian Rhapsody", while also noting that "his own original compositions" are "actually more ambitious".

== Track title information ==
- "143 (Kelly's Song)": The subtitle "Kelly's Song" is a reference to Shimabukuro's then-fiancée, Kelly Yamasato. The couple were married in May 2011. "143" was inspired by Jake’s years in high school when cell phones and texting didn't exist. Cool kids generally had a pager, with numeric codes, and "143" was the numeric code for "I love you."
- "Bring Your Adz": An adz is a small ancient Hawaiian tool for cutting that resembles a small axe. In rock n' roll, players usually refer to their guitars as their axe. Jake explained, "I remember hearing people say, 'Bring your axe to the gig.' I guess 'Bring your adz' is the ukulele version of the expression."
- "Go For Broke" was inspired by World War II Japanese-American veterans (the 442nd, 100th, 1399th, and MIS). "Go For Broke", which means "to risk everything on one great effort to win big", was the motto of the Japanese-American soldiers from Hawaii who were the first to volunteer to fight overseas, proving their loyalty to America and securing a better life for all Asian-Americans currently living in the U.S.

== Track listing ==
All tracks composed by Jake Shimabukuro except where noted.

1. "143 (Kelly's Song)" 2011
2. "Bohemian Rhapsody" (Freddie Mercury)
3. "Bring Your Adz"
4. "Boy Meets Girl"
5. "Go for Broke"
6. "Trapped" 2010
7. "Variation on a Dance" 2010
8. "Pianoforte" 2010
9. "Five Dollars Unleaded" 2010
10. "Ukulele Bros." (Bruce Shimabukuro – Jake's brother)
11. "Hallelujah" (Leonard Cohen)
12. "Bohemian Rhapsody" (Freddie Mercury) – Live version

== Charts ==
Chart (2015)	Peak position
US World Albums (Billboard)	1
US Heatseekers Albums (Billboard)	4
