= Roy Sakuma =

- Born: January 22, 1947 (age 79); Hawaii
- Genres: Jazz, blues, rock, Hawaiian
- Instrument: Ukulele
- Years active: 1970–present

Roy Sakuma (born Jan 22, 1947) is a ukulele teacher, credited for sparking new generations of ukulele players and virtuosos like Jake Shimabukuro who got his start as a young student at Roy Sakuma Studios. Sakuma launched what is considered to be the first major ukulele festival in 1971, an annual event in Honolulu that continued for 52 years.

He is well known in Hawaii for creating the Roy Sakuma Method, an alphabet-based ukulele instructional course that simplified how students read--and play--music.

== Biography ==
Sakuma grew up in a home with mental illness. His mother suffered from paranoid schizophrenia, his brother suffered from the same illness and died when he was 27 of an apparent suicide. By the age of 14, confused by his home life and the teasing by his peers about his congenital ear deformity, Sakuma was kicked out of high school, but found a mentor in ukulele master Herb Ohta, known professionally as Ohta-san and Sakuma became a "stellar student". After nearly two years, he became a substitute teacher for Ohta-san’s ukulele classes and then became an instructor. In the early 1970s, Sakuma began work for the City and County of Honolulu as a groundskeeper at Kapiolani Park where he got the idea to launch the first annual Ukulele Festival in 1971. Sakuma, under the guidance of his mentor Moroni Medeiros, culture and arts coordinator with Honolulu Department of Parks and Recreation, lined up the Hawaii International Ukulele Club and the City & County of Honolulu to sponsor that first free concert. He also volunteered at the nearby Jefferson Elementary School, teaching ukulele classes to students with learning—and physical—disabilities. Sakuma taught for Ohta-san and Kamaka Ukulele until 1974 when he launched Roy Sakuma Ukulele Studios in Kaimuki. Since then, three additional studio locations opened throughout Oahu. Sakuma’s former students are hired help teach classes. Sakuma married Kathy Kawano Oct. 24, 1976. They have worked together ever since, focusing on teaching ukulele lessons and preserving interest in the ukulele with a mission of sharing the message of laughter, love, and hope through the instrument. Roy Sakuma is invited to speak to students about mental health, bullying, and overcoming insecurities. He often closes his talks by teach the song he wrote, "I Am What I Am,” about self-acceptance.

== Ukulele Festival Hawaii ==
The annual Ukulele Festival at Kapiolani Park in Waikiki became a summer tradition and grew into the largest ukulele festival in the world featuring ukulele players from around the world. The highlight of the event is the ukulele orchestra of more than 800 - mostly children. Notable ukulele artists that have participated are Eddie Kamae, Ohta San, Lyle Ritz, Israel Kamakawiwoʻole, Troy Fernandez, Paula Fuga, and Jake Shimabukuro. National celebrities include singer-songwriter James Ingram, Jack Johnson (musician), and jazz guitarist, Howard Roberts. Today, there are ukulele festivals all over the world.

Ukulele Festival Hawaii celebrated its 50th anniversary in 2020 with a television documentary hosted by Roy Sakuma and Jake Shimabukuro

After 52 years, Ukulele Festival Hawaii and founders Roy & Kathy Sakuma celebrated their final event in 2022. Dream fulfilled!

== Roy Sakuma Ukulele Studios ==
The Roy Sakuma Ukulele Studios opened in 1974. Since then, Roy and his wife, Kathy, have kept Hawaii's cultural mainstay alive by expanding their teaching studios to four locations with their staff of instructors of former students. The Roy Sakuma Method of Ukulele Instruction has brought music to generations of ukulele players and has fostered amateur and professional players alike, many who have gone on to become well-known artists, including Paula Fuga, and Jake Shimabukuro.

== Roy Sakuma Productions ==
The Roy Sakuma Productions record label is home to a collection of musical styles connected to Hawaii's rich, musical heritage. Under the direction of Sakuma, the company produced and recorded a number of Na Hoku Hanohano Award-winning albums and songs. Some of the award-winning artists on the label include Herb "Ohta-San" Ohta (instrumental ukulele), Ka'au Crater Boys (island contemporary), Herb Ohta, Jr. (ukulele), Noel Okimoto (jazz and drums), and Holunape (traditional Hawaiian sounds).

== Charity ==
In 2004, Roy and Kathy Sakuma established Ukulele Festival Hawaii, a nonprofit organization to continue supporting free ukulele festivals, showcasing the instrument's virtuosity, and providing college scholarships, as well as ukuleles to those in need. The organization's mission is "to bring laughter, love, and hope to children and adults... through the music of the ukulele.

== Books ==
- Sakuma, Roy. Treasury of Ukulele Chords. Roy Sakuma Productions, 1998 ISBN 978-0966289701
- Sakuma, Roy. Treasury of Ukulele Chords, Japanese version. Roy Sakuma Productions, 2000.

== Video/DVD ==
- Learn to Play the Ukulele with Roy Sakuma - Roy Sakuma Productions (2012) ASIN: B0019ZSLZG
- Ukulele Picking Techniques - Roy Sakuma - (2010) ASIN: 0966289757
- Roy Sakuma Hawaiian Style Ukulele Basic - Musical House, Hawaii ASIN: B000SUYJXG
