= Travels (Jake Shimabukuro album) =

Studio album by Jake Shimabukuro
- Released: October 9, 2015
- Studio: Island Sound Studios; Studio 143
- Genre: Pop/Rock; New Age
- Length: 70:25
- Label: Hitchhike Records
- Producer: Milan Bersota; Dean Taba

Jake Shimabukuro chronology
Grand Ukulele (2012)	Travels (2015)	Live in Japan (2016)

Professional ratings
Review scores
Source	Rating
AllMusic	3.5/5 stars

Travels is the eleventh solo album by Japanese-American ukulele virtuoso, Jake Shimabukuro. It was released on October 9, 2015, by Hitchhike Records. The album peaked at No. 2 on the Billboard World Albums chart and No. 11 on its Heatseekers Albums chart.

== Track listing ==
All tracks are written by Jake Shimabukuro, unless otherwise noted.

No.	Title	Writer(s)	Length
1.	"Departure Suite, Pt. 1"	Jake Shimabukuro; Dean Taba	2:56
2.	"Train Ride"		3:45
3.	"Low Rider"	Jerry Goldstein; War (Thomas Sylvester "Papa Dee" Allen; Harold Ray Brown; Moris "B.B." Dickerson; Leroy Jordan; Charles Miller; Lee Oskar; Howard E. Scott)	5:35
4.	"Travels"		6:09
5.	"Interlude 1"		0:48
6.	"Passport"	Jake Shimabukuro; Dean Taba	3:16
7.	"Hi'ilawe"	Traditional	2:26
8.	"Everything Is Better with You"		4:01
9.	"Departure Suite, Pts. 2-3"		3:17
10.	"Oama"		3:55
11.	"I'll Be There"	Berry Gordy; Hal Davis; Willie Hutchison; Bob West	4:33
12.	"Haven't We Been Here Before?"	Jake Shimabukuro; Dean Taba	3:00
13.	"Interlude 2"	Dean Taba	1:16
14.	"Kawika"	Traditional	5:38
15.	"Red-Eye"		3:15
16.	"Ichigo Ichie"		5:25
17.	"Dinner & a Movie"		5:35
Total length:			70:25

== Musicians ==
- Jake Shimabukuro – baritone ukulele, clapping, ukulele, vocals
- Del Beazley – guitar, vocals
- Michael Grande – keyboards, clapping
- Chris Kamaka – upright bass, vocals
- Noel Okimoto – drums, marimba, percussion, vibraphone, clapping
- Jeff Richman – guitar
- Dean Taba – bass, clapping
- Sharene Taba – harp
- Bryan Tolentino – ukulele, vocals
- Asa Young – 12 string guitar, vocals
- Chae Choe – clapping
- Yukari Takai – clapping
- Van Fletcher – clapping

== Production ==
- Milan Bersota – Producer, Engineer, Mixing Engineer
- Dean Taba – Producer
- John Baldwin – Mastering Engineer
- Paul Grosso – Art Direction, Design
- Carl Dunn – Photography
- Chae Choe – Assistant Engineer
- Yukari Takai – Management
- Van Fletcher – Management

Track information and credits adapted from the album's liner notes.

== Charts ==
Chart (2015)	Peak position
US World Albums (Billboard)	2
US Heatseekers Albums (Billboard)	11
