= Guitar and Lute Workshop =

Coordinates: 21.2935°N 157.8478°W

- The Guitar and Lute Workshop floor, circa 1974. This photograph was taken from the second story of the office space where the Galliard Press linotype press was located.
- Type: Private
- Industry: Musical Instruments
- Founded: Honolulu, Hawaii, 1970
- Defunct: 1976
- Products: Various Stringed Instruments

The Guitar and Lute Workshop (GLW) was a manufacturer of custom guitars, ukuleles, and period stringed instruments based in Honolulu, Hawaii between 1970 and 1976. The workshop was known primarily for the talented luthiers employed in either construction of guitars, or the musicians that taught at the workshop or that used guitars made at the workshop. Additionally, an independent piano restoration and tuning business operated above the workshop floor and studios for at least two years. The GLW was notable as a nexus of activity supporting native Hawaiian musical cultural discovery during the Second Hawaiian Renaissance of the 1970s such as restoration of the musical instruments belonging to former Hawaiian royalty which are now curated by ʻIolani Palace. Key Hawaiian musicians such as Keola Beamer and Kapono Beamer got early boosts to their careers at the GLW.

== Establishment and business ==
The Guitar and Lute Workshop was started by Donald C. Marienthal, George Gilmore, and Keola Beamer in 1970 and was based in a warehouse building on Waimanu Street near Ala Moana Shopping Center. A retail outlet to the manufacturing facility was later opened nearby. The workshop closed in 1976. The warehouse was demolished in 1998 to make way for two large commercial properties and the KHON television studios.

Keola Beamer recalls the early days of the GLW: "In my early twenties, I was making guitars with George Gilmore and Donald Marienthal. We had the wild idea we could make nice guitars out of koa and mango wood so we took out a loan from the Small Business Administration and started the Guitar and Lute Workshop on Waimanu Street in Honolulu. People started coming in to ask about slack key. There were very few teachers back then, so I agreed to try it."

Early development of the twin-sound hole guitar is partially attributed to the GLW, with at least two of the twin-hole guitars becoming a signature style for Keola and Kapono Beamer as their musical careers evolved, specifically around the traditional Hawaiian slack-key guitar style. Due to the immaturity of the twin-hole style early on, some twin-hole guitars were returned to the GLW for repair, ostensibly due to distorted tops (sound board) as a result of insufficient bracing under the bridge.

In addition to guitars, specialty instruments produced at the GLW included lute, vihuela, and viola da gamba. At least one of Eddie Kamae's ukuleles was built at the GLW by Brian Ikehara. The shop also sold musical supplies, such as ukulele and steel strings, as well as miscellaneous items such as harmonicas, all of which added profitability to the shop, but which the shop owners did not consider associated with “legitimate musical instruments”.

A very early advertisement for the GLW and its then new retail storefront at 404 Piikoi St, circa 1972. The ad emphasizes both key aspects of the GLW operation: custom instrument manufacturing and musical instruction.

== Adjunct and associated musical businesses ==
An offshoot enterprise of the GLW was Galliard Press, publisher of the Guitar and Lute magazine (beginning with Volume 1 in April, 1974) and various books on classical guitar and lute music. It was conceived by George Gilmore, and was noted as being the last guitar magazine published on a linotype press.

Gilmore, a classical guitar teacher at Punahou School in the 1960s, and Sam Kamaka Jr. (of the Kamaka Ukulele company) started the Lute Society and taught evening sessions in guitar and lute construction from 1966 to 1970. Gilmore learned lutherie in Spain (classic guitar construction) and influenced some of the techniques still used today at the Kamaka factory.

A close friend of Gilmore, Ralph Hedges, established a piano tuning and restoration business adjacent to George's office and studio, and next to the workshop floor. A number of pianos were restored in this area of the workshop, most notably a square piano attributed to King Kalākaua and Queen Liliuokalani, which was later donated to ‘Iolani Palace. The piano is now located in the palace Blue Room.

Peter Coraggio, an early proponent of ARP synthesizers shared studio space with the GLW in 1973. His studio contained two ARP 2500, one ARP 2600, an ARP Odyssey, and a mixing board. The Coraggio studios were on the south side of studio space, immediately adjacent to the guitar studios and guitar showroom.

== GLW alumni ==
Notable alumni (luthiers and musicians) associated with the GLW include:

- Beamer, Kapono – Hawaiian Slack Key guitar artist
- Beamer, Keola – Hawaiian Slack Key guitar artist and GLW founder and luthier (1970-1973)
- Brotman, Charles – Luthier
- Ching, Doug – Luthier (1973-1975), noted as being one of the last luthiers to work at GLW before its closure in 1976
- Coraggio, Peter – Musician and early proponent of ARP synthesizers, co-located at the GLW studios; Professor Emeritus, University of Hawaii
- Doremus, Jay - Luthier (1973-1974)
- Gilmore, George – Founder and owner of the GLW (1970-1975), luthier, and music professor at University of Hawaii at Manoa, publisher of “Guitar and Lute” magazine.
- Hedges, Ralph – Piano restorer, tuner, and classical pianist and instructor (1972-1973)
- Huvard, Anthony - GLW luthier (1970-), GLW repairs manager, inventor of neck-straightening heat press
- Ikehara, Brian – Luthier (1973–1974)
- Irvine, Kip - Luthier (1975-)
- Marienthal, Donald C. – Founder and owner of the GLW (1970-1975)
- Martin, Dey – Luthier
- Pong, Randall - Luthier
- Potter, Bart – GLW luthiers (1974-1975), founder of the Hawaii Forest Industry Association
