= Lyle Ritz =

American musician (1930–2017)

- Born: Lyle Joseph Ritz; January 10, 1930; Cleveland, Ohio, U.S.
- Died: March 3, 2017 (aged 87) Portland, Oregon, U.S.
- Genres: Jazz; blues; rock; Hawaiian
- Instruments: Ukulele; bass guitar; double bass
- Years active: 1957–2017
- Labels: Verve
- Formerly of: The Wrecking Crew; Herb Alpert; Beach Boys; Herb Ohta

Lyle Joseph Ritz (January 10, 1930 – March 3, 2017) was an American musician, known for his work on ukulele and bass (both double bass and bass guitar). His early career in jazz as a ukulele player made him a key part of the Hawaii music scene in the 1950s. By the 1960s, he had begun working as a session musician, more often on double bass or electric bass guitar. His prominence in the Los Angeles session scene made him a part of the Wrecking Crew, an informal group of well-used Los Angeles–based musicians. Ritz contributed to many American pop hits from the mid-1960s to the early 1980s. Starting in the mid-1980s, a rediscovery of his earlier ukulele work led to him becoming a fixture in live festivals, and a revival of his interest in playing the ukulele. He was inducted into both the Ukulele Hall of Fame Museum and the Musicians Hall of Fame and Museum in 2007.

== Career ==
=== Southern California Music Company & US Army Band ===
Lyle Ritz began his music career as a college student working at the Southern California Music Company in Los Angeles. Responsible for the small goods department, he demonstrated instruments including the ukulele, which was being popularized by Arthur Godfrey at the time. He purchased a Gibson tenor ukulele for his own use.

Drafted into the US Army during the Korean War, Ritz played tuba in the United States Army Band. Stationed at Fort Ord, Ritz learned to play the acoustic bass. While on leave, Ritz visited the Music Company and played a few tunes on the ukulele at the urging of his colleagues. Unbeknownst to him, Guitarist Barney Kessel, a talent scout for Verve Records, was standing there.

=== Verve Records ===
After hearing Ritz play, Kessel approached him and made the connection that resulted in his first commercial records.

Verve released Ritz's first ukulele record, How About Uke?, in 1957. 50th State Jazz was released in 1959. Both records became very popular in Hawaii and started a wave of new ukulele players. However, the records had only limited popularity on the mainland.

=== The Wrecking Crew ===
To support himself, Ritz abandoned the ukulele and became a session musician on the bass guitar. He joined the Wrecking Crew, a popular group of studio musicians in the Los Angeles recording industry. Ritz compiled over 5,000 credits including such notable tracks as Herb Alpert's "A Taste of Honey", The Righteous Brothers' "You've Lost That Lovin' Feelin'", and the Beach Boys' "God Only Knows". Other notable recording artists he backed up include Sonny & Cher, the Monkees, Herb Ohta, Dean Martin, and Linda Ronstadt. He also played bass on television soundtracks including The Rockford Files, Name That Tune, and Kojak.

In 1979, Ritz was hired to play the ukulele in place of Steve Martin when Martin was shown playing in The Jerk. In 1980, Ritz was a musician playing bass on Face the Music, a game show centered on musical puzzles.

=== Return to ukulele music ===
Roy Sakuma, a fellow ukulele player and record producer, looked up Ritz in 1984 and brought him to Hawaii for the Annual Ukulele Festival. Ritz had no idea how popular his Verve records still were in Hawaii, but he participated in the festival during the next three years. In 1988, he decided it was time to retire from the circuit, but he continued to play. His third album, Time, was released by Roy Sakuma Records the same year. In 1999, Jim Beloff, founder of Flea Market Music, put together the annual UKEtopia concert in California. Among the notable events were Bill Tapia and Ritz trading jazz licks in an impromptu cutting contest.

In 2005, Ritz purchased an Apple laptop and a copy of GarageBand, software used to make home recordings. After a half year's work, he completed a new solo album, No Frills, released in 2006. He recorded the bass track using a synthesizer so he could concentrate on the jazz ukulele. Ritz was inducted into the Ukulele Hall of Fame in 2007. His citation reads in part: "Ritz will always be known as the brilliant pioneer in the area of ukulele jazz."

=== Death ===
Ritz died in Portland, Oregon, at the age of 87.

== Discography ==
- How About Uke? (Verve, 1958)
- 50th State Jazz (Verve, 1959)
- Time (Roy Sakuma, 1995)
- A Night of Ukulele Jazz (Flea Market Music 2001)
- Ukulele Duo (JVC, 2001)
- No Frills (Flea Market Music, 2006)

=== In collaboration ===
With Rebecca Kilgore

- I Wish You Love with Lyle Ritz (PDX Uke, 2007)
- Bossa Style with Lyle Ritz (PDX Uke, 2009)

=== As sideman ===
With The Beach Boys

- Summer Days (And Summer Nights!!) (Capitol, 1965)
- Pet Sounds (Capitol, 1966)
- Smiley Smile (Capitol, 1967)
- Friends (Capitol, 1968)
- 20/20 (Capitol, 1970)
- 15 Big Ones (Reprise, 1976)
- L.A. (Light Album) (CBS, 1979)
- Keepin' the Summer Alive (CBS, 1980)

With Cher

- All I Really Want to Do (Imperial, 1965)
- Cher (Imperial, 1966)

With Randy Edelman

- The Laughter and the Tears (Lion, 1972)
- You're the One (Arista, 1979)

With The Everly Brothers

- Gone Gone Gone (Warner Bros., 1964)
- In Our Image (Warner Bros., 1966)

With The Monkees

- The Birds, the Bees & the Monkees (Colgems, 1968)

With Randy Newman

- Randy Newman (Reprise, 1968)
- 12 Songs (Reprise, 1970)

With Harry Nilsson

- Pandemonium Shadow Show (RCA Victor, 1967)
- Aerial Ballet (RCA Victor, 1968)
- Harry (RCA Victor, 1969)
- Duit on Mon Dei (RCA Victor, 1975)

With Mike Post

- Fused (Warner Bros., 1969)
- Railhead Overture (MGM, 1975)

With Sonny & Cher

- Look at Us (Atco, 1965)
- In Case You're in Love (Atlantic, 1967)

With Sammy Walker

- Sammy Walker (Warner Bros., 1976)
- Blue Ridge Mountain Skyline (Warner Bros., 1977)

With Mason Williams

- The Mason Williams Ear Show (Warner Bros., 1968)
- The Mason Williams Phonograph Record (Warner Bros., 1968)

With others

- Les Baxter, Moog Rock (GNP Crescendo, 1969)
- Martin Bell, Songs from the Way of the Wolf (Seabury Press, 1970)
- Theodore Bikel, A Folksinger's Choice (Elektra, 1964)
- Lisa Hartman Black, Lisa Hartman Black (Kirshner, 1976)
- Brewer & Shipley, Down in L.A. (A&M, 1968)
- Teresa Brewer, Music, Music, Music (Amsterdam, 1973)
- Toni Brown, Toni Brown (Fantasy, 1979)
- Les Brown, Swingin' the Masters! (Columbia, 1963)
- Dennis Budimir, The Creeper (Mainstream, 1965)
- Bobby Darin, From Hello Dolly to Goodbye Charlie (Capitol, 1964)
- Ron Elliott, The Candlestickmaker (Warner Bros., 1969)
- Phil Everly, Star Spangled Springer (RCA, 1973)
- Bob Florence, Bongos/Reeds/Brass (HiFi, 1960)
- Roosevelt Grier, Soul City (Recording Industries, 1964)
- James William Guercio, Electra Glide in Blue (United Artists, 1973)
- Hager Twins, The Hagers (Elektra, 1974)
- Screamin' Jay Hawkins, What That Is! (Philips, 1969)
- Dan Hicks, It Happened One Bite (Warner Bros., 1978)
- Paul Horn, Impressions! (World Pacific, 1958)
- Sarah Kernochan, Beat Around the Bush (RCA, 1974)
- Al Kooper, Easy Does It (Columbia, 1970)
- Claudine Longet, Colours (A&M, 1968)
- Barry Mann, Survivor (RCA Victor, 1975)
- Bob Morrison, Friends of Mine (Capitol, 1971)
- Mystic Moods Orchestra, Extensions (Philips, 1969)
- Van Dyke Parks, Song Cycle (Warner Bros., 1967)
- Dory Previn, Dory Previn (Warner Bros., 1974)
- Emitt Rhodes, The American Dreams (A&M, 1970)
- Ann Richards, Live at the Losers (Vee Jay, 1963)
- Nelson Riddle, Contemporary Sound of Nelson Riddle (United Artists, 1968)
- The Righteous Brothers, Back to Back (Philles, 1965)
- Jerry Riopelle, Saving Grace (ABC, 1974)
- Austin Roberts, The Last Thing On My Mind (Chelsea, 1973)
- Linda Ronstadt, Linda Ronstadt (Capitol, 1971)
- Evie Sands, Any Way That You Want Me (Rev-Ola, 1970)
- Ike & Tina Turner, River Deep – Mountain High (A&M, 1966)
- Townes Van Zandt, Our Mother the Mountain (Poppy, 1969)
- Loudon Wainwright III, Unrequited (Columbia, 1975)
- Ian Whitcomb, Yellow Underground (Tower, 1967)
- Andy Williams, Solitaire (Columbia, 1973)
- Stan Wilson, Stan Wilson at the Ash Grove (Verve, 1959)

== Bibliography ==
- Ritz, Lyle (2001). Jumpin Jim's Ukulele Masters. Flea Market Music. ISBN 978-0634027642.
- Ritz, Lyle; Beloff, Jim (2002). Jumpin' Jim's Ukulele Masters: Lyle Ritz Solos. Flea Market Music. ISBN 978-0634046582.
- Ritz, Lyle (2008). Lyle Lite: 16 Easy Chord Solos Arranged by Ukulele Jazz Master Lyle Ritz. Flea Market Music. ISBN 978-1423437819.
