= This Time (Al Jarreau album) =

Studio album by Al Jarreau
- Released: June 13, 1980
- Recorded: 1980
- Studios: Dawnbreaker Studios (San Fernando); Garden Rake Studios (Sherman Oaks); Jennifudy Studios (North Hollywood)
- Genres: Jazz; R&B
- Length: 42:19
- Label: Warner Bros.
- Producer: Jay Graydon

Al Jarreau chronology
All Fly Home (1978)	This Time (1980)	Breakin' Away (1981)

Singles from This Time
- 1. "Never Givin' Up" Released: April 11, 1980; 2. "Gimme What You Got" Released: August 26, 1980; 3. "Distracted" Released: November 2, 1980

Professional ratings
Review scores
Source	Rating
AllMusic	4.5/5 stars

This Time is the fourth studio album by Jazz vocalist Al Jarreau, released on June 13, 1980, on Warner Bros. Records. The release marked a change in Jarreau's sound to a more R&B-oriented flavor. As a result, the album achieved more success on the mainstream charts than his previous works, while also topping the Jazz Charts. It also reached No. 6 on the R&B charts and No. 27 on the Billboard 200." In 1981 "Never Givin' Up" gave Jarreau a Grammy Award nomination for Best R&B Vocal Performance, Male.

This Time marked Jarreau's first foray into the top 40 on the Hot 200 or top 10 on the R&B charts, as well as his first No. 1 on the Jazz charts. His next album would prove even more successful, topping both the Jazz and R&B charts.

== Track listing ==
Side one
No.	Title	Writer(s)	Length
1.	"Never Givin' Up"	Al Jarreau; Tom Canning	3:56
2.	"Gimme What You Got"	Jarreau; Canning	3:43
3.	"Love Is Real"	Jarreau; Canning; Tom Kellock	4:23
4.	"Alonzo"	Jarreau	5:25
5.	"(If I Could Only) Change Your Mind"	Canning; Allee Willis	4:16

No.	Title	Writer(s)	Length
6.	"Spain (I Can Recall)"	Jarreau; Chick Corea; Artie Maren	6:31
7.	"Distracted"	Jarreau	5:51
8.	"Your Sweet Love"	Jarreau; Canning; Kellock	4:13
9.	"(A Rhyme) This Time"	Jarreau; Earl Klugh	3:42
Total length:			42:19

== Personnel ==
=== Musicians ===
- Al Jarreau – lead vocals, backing vocals (1–3, 5, 7), vocal percussion (1, 4), rhythm arrangements (1–4, 7–9)
- Greg Mathieson – piano (1), string synthesizer (1, 3–5), rhythm arrangements (1)
- Tom Canning – Fender Rhodes (2, 4, 5, 8), piano (3, 5, 8), bells (8), rhythm arrangements (1, 2, 5, 8)
- David Foster – piano (2), Fender Rhodes (3, 9)
- Michael Omartian – string synthesizer (2, 8)
- Larry Williams – synthesizers (3, 6, 8), Fender Rhodes (6)
- Steve George – synthesizers (7)
- George Duke – Fender Rhodes (7)
- Jay Graydon – guitar (1–3, 5, 7, 8), synthesizer programming (1–3, 5, 8), rhythm arrangements (2–4, 7–9)
- Oscar Castro-Neves – gut-string guitar (1)
- Dean Parks – guitar (3, 5)
- Earl Klugh – gut-string guitar (9), rhythm arrangements (9)
- Abraham Laboriel – bass
- Ralph Humphrey – drums (1, 4, 5, 9), percussion (4)
- Carlos Vega – drums (2, 3)
- Steve Gadd – drums (6–8)
- Jerry Hey – flugelhorn (1, 2, 7, 8), trumpet (3, 7), horn arrangements (1, 3, 7)
- Chuck Findley – trumpet (3, 7)
- Bill Reichenbach Jr. – trombone (3, 7)
- Earl Lon Price – alto saxophone solo (7)
- Les Thompson – harmonica solo (5)
- Tom Kellock – rhythm arrangements (3)

=== Technical ===
- Produced by Jay Graydon
- Engineered by Joe Bogan (basic tracks) and Jay Graydon (remix and overdubs)
- Second engineer – Debbie Thompson (basic tracks)
- Mastered by Bernie Grundman at A&M Records (Hollywood, CA)
- Art direction – Richard Seireeni
- Cover photography – Richard Avedon
- Sleeve photography – Michael Rice and Susan Jarreau
- Sleeve still life – Harry Mittman
- Management – Patrick Rains & Associates

== Charts & Awards ==
=== Album ===
Chart (1980)	Peak position
U.S. Billboard 200	27
R&B	6
Jazz	1

Year End Chart (1980)	Peak
Jazz	40

=== Charting Singles ===
Year	Song	Peak chart positions	
Year	Song	US Pop	US R&B
1980	"Distracted"	-	61
1980	"Gimmie What You Got"	-	63
1980	"Never Givin' Up"	102	26

"Never Givin' Up" received a Grammy Award nomination for Best R&B Vocal Performance, Male in 1981, Jarreau's first nomination in the R&B field. It lost to Jarreau's Warner Bros. labelmate George Benson for the Give Me the Night album, who had recently undergone a similar change in sound.
