= Kamaka Ukulele =

Hawaiian ukulele company

Kamaka ʻUkulele
- Trade name: Kamaka Hawaiʻi, Inc.
- Company type: Private
- Industry: Musical Instruments
- Founded: 1916; 110 years ago in Kaimuki, Hawaii, United States
- Headquarters: Kaimuki, Hawaii, United States (1916–1952; 1953–1970); Honolulu, Hawaii, United States (1970–present)
- Key people: Samuel Kamaka Sr. (founder), Samuel Kamaka Jr., Frederick Kamaka
- Products: Ukuleles

Kamaka ʻUkulele, also known as Kamaka Hawaiʻi, Inc., or just Kamaka, is a Hawaii-based and family-owned maker of ukuleles. It is often credited with producing some of the world's finest ukuleles, and created the first pineapple ukulele. The company manufactures nine types of ukulele.

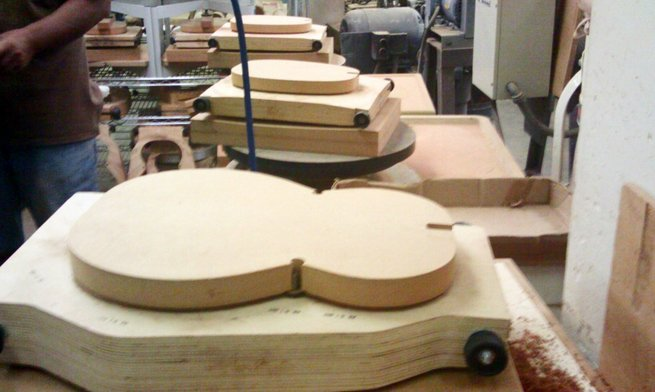
Inside the Kamaka factory in Honolulu

== History ==
In 1910, Samuel Kaialiilii Kamaka Sr. entered apprenticeship under Manuel Nunes to make ukuleles. Kamaka founded his own shop in 1916. It was called "Kamaka Ukulele and Guitar Works" and was operated from Kamaka's basement. In 1921 Kamaka opened a store in Kaimuki, near Honolulu. Kamaka already had a reputation for making high-quality instruments, and the shop thrived through the 1920s and 1930s. The first Kamaka ukeleles were $5 apiece.

In 1927, Samuel Kamaka Sr. made a new design of ukulele, which produced a more mellow sound than that of a normal figure-eight shaped ukulele. His friends are said to have commented that this new ukulele looked like a pineapple, and one of Samuel's friends, an artist, painted an image of a pineapple on the front of the new ukulele. The new shape immediately became popular, and in 1928 Kamaka was awarded a patent on the pineapple ukulele.

=== 1940s–2000's ===
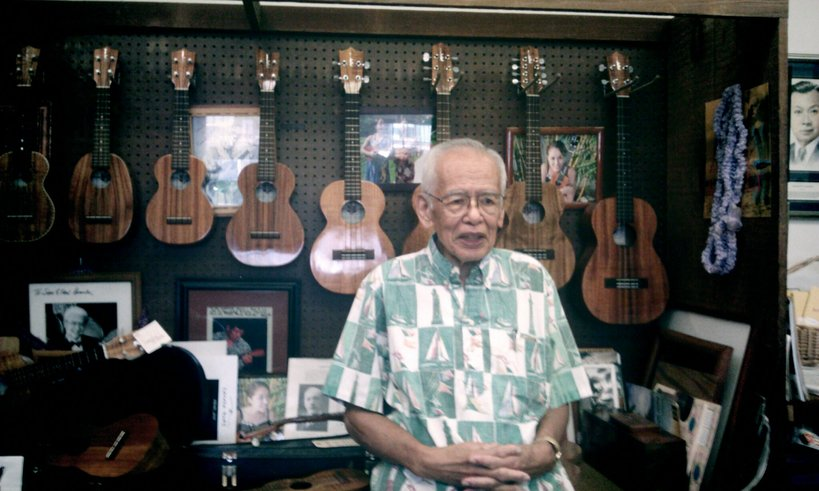
Fred Kamaka Sr. in 2011

Samuel Kamaka Sr. had two sons, Samuel Jr. and Frederick, and when the boys were in grade school he began to teach them the art of crafting ukuleles. In 1945 the company reorganized as "Kamaka and Sons Enterprises", but when both Kamaka boys were drafted to fight in World War II, ukulele making took a back seat. When the boys returned from the war, Samuel Jr. and Frederick attended Washington State University, and later got a job in the Army. Samuel Jr. earned a bachelor's degree and pursued a doctorate in entomology from Oregon State University.

Samuel Kamaka semi-retired early in 1952 due to illness and went to the family estate in Waianae to make ukuleles. He died in December 1953. Upon his father's death, Samuel Jr. abandoned his studies, instead choosing to continue the family business. He restored the company to its original location in Kaimuki, and expanded the company in 1959. Kamaka and Sons incorporated in 1968. Samuel Kamaka Jr. was active in the local luthier scene; along with friend George Gilmore (of the Guitar and Lute Workshop), they created the Lute Society. Together, they taught night courses in lute and guitar construction techniques from 1966 to 1970. Roy Sakuma was part of a group of ukelele teachers and students that started in 1971 to gather in the Kamaka store to play together, a gathering that would give birth to the Ukulele Festival Hawaii.

During the 1980s, sales fell flat and the company survived thanks to its sales in Japan through its subsidiary Kama‘āina. In 2016, Kamaka Ukulele released a ukulele-themed line of aloha wear and a 2-disc CD in collaboration with Reyn Spooner to celebrate its 100th anniversary.

==== Employment of people with disabilities ====
In 1955, Kamaka first hired disabled employees, a time at which the disabled were viewed as unable to work. Two hearing-impaired individuals were hired as craftsmen, and were found to be exemplary workers, because of their enhanced sense of touch, which allowed them to craft better ukuleles, able to feel the thickness of the wood.

== Description ==
Kamaka produces ukeles, mainly from koa wood, the endemic Hawaiian wood. Kamaka makes standard, concert, tenor and baritone ukeleles featuring four, six and eight strings.

Authorized dealers of Kamaka ukuleles worldwide are scarce. In 2009, Ukulele Hut in Guam and Matt Umanov Guitar shop in New York were added to the small list of authorized dealers.

== Famous endorsements ==
Kamaka ukuleles are endorsed by a number of professional musicians including ukulele prodigy Jake Shimabukuro. Shimabukuro, who achieved popular recognition following the performance of his arrangement of George Harrison's "While My Guitar Gently Weeps", plays a Kamaka 4-string tenor ukulele custom built to his specification by the luthiers at Kamaka's workshop. The instrument features solid master-grade Hawaiian curly koa wood and a Fishman pickup.

George Harrison was also fond of the Kamaka ukulele; he played the concert, the tenor 6-string and tenor 8-string. According to one music store on Maui, Hawaii, Harrison would purchase all the Kamaka ukuleles in stock to give to his friends as gifts.

Adam Sandler played a Kamaka ukulele in the movie 50 First Dates. The ukulele was a custom 6-string Kamaka designed to Sandler's specifications. It appears in the movie's official poster and on the cover of the DVD and soundtrack, although the ukulele was digitally modified to resemble a 4-string.

== Awards ==
- Recognition award for "Outstanding and reliable service" from the Better Business Bureau of Hawaii (1988)
- "Outstanding Employer of Persons with Disabilities Award" presented by the State of Hawaii Vocational Rehabilitation and Services for the Blind Division (1990)
- Sam Kamaka Jr. and Fred Kamaka Sr. selected as the Hawaiian Business Persons of the Year and given 'O'o Award from the Hawaiian Business/Professional Association (now known as the Native Hawaiian Chamber of Commerce) (1992)
- Honolulu Mayor Frank Fasi proclaims April 30, 1992 as "Samuel and Frederick Kamaka Day." (1992)
- Hawaii Governor John Waihee awards Sam Jr. and Fred Sr. with certificates of commendation, recognizing Sam Jr. is as "one of the legends of the music industry" and "one of Hawaii's favorite sons." (1992)
- Kamaka Hawaii receives the Holo I Mua Award for Excellence from the Better Business Bureau of Hawaii (now "Torch Award for Business Ethics"). In 77 years of manufacturing, no customer complaints were lodged against the company. (1993)
- Hawaii State Legislature recognizes the Kamaka brothers and their company for "making fine ukuleles esteemed throughout the world and thus preserving Hawaiian culture and contributing to world music." (1999)
- Samuel Kamaka Sr. inducted into the Ukulele Hall of Fame in Rhode Island. (2000)
- Sam Kamaka, Jr. receives the "Ukulele Treasure" award from the Ukulele Guild of Hawaii (2004)
- Kamaka Hawaii Inc. was inducted in to the Hawaiian Music Hall of Fame (2014)
