= Jim Beloff =

American musician

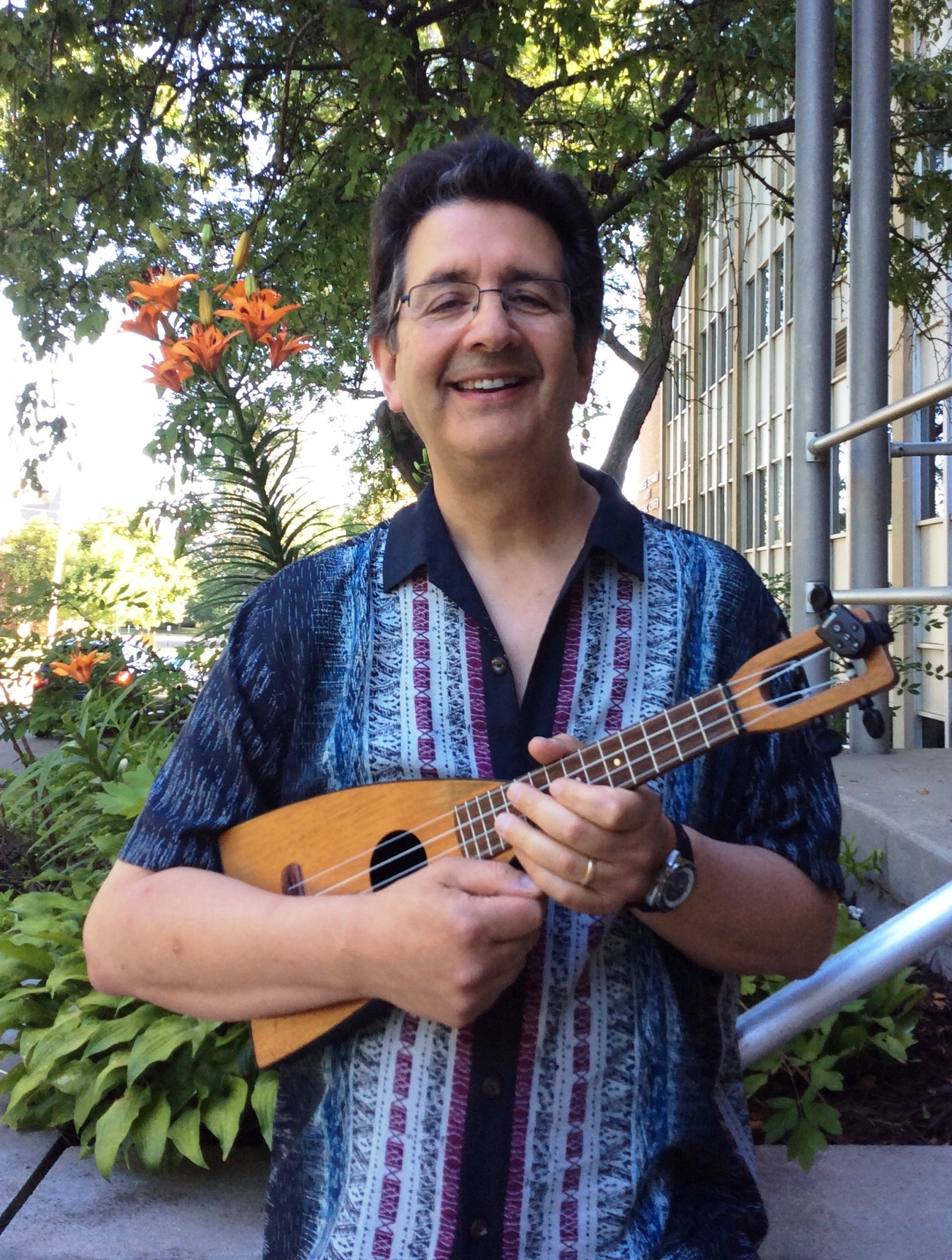

Background information
- Also known as: Jumpin' Jim
- Born: James Beloff; December 25, 1955 (age 70); Meriden, Connecticut, U.S.
- Genre: Singer-songwriter
- Occupation: Musician
- Instrument: Ukulele
- Years active: 1992–present
- Labels: Flea Market Music, Inc.

James Beloff (born December 25, 1955) is an American musician and singer-songwriter. He is a leading proponent of the ukulele. After working in the music industry in Los Angeles, he discovered the ukulele and became an advocate of the instrument. He established Flea Market Music, publisher of the Jumpin' Jim's ukulele songbook series. Beloff's songbooks and instructional books (arranged by him and other well-known ukulele players), DVDs and promotion and marketing of his family's Fluke and Flea ukuleles have contributed to the popularity of the instrument. He is also a singer-songwriter and has recorded several solo CDs as well as two with his wife, Liz.

== Early Endeavours ==
Jim Beloff is a graduate of Hampshire College where he focused on musical theatre. After working on 1600 Pennsylvania Avenue, a short lived Broadway musical by Alan Jay Lerner and Leonard Bernstein, Beloff composed several children's musicals that were produced in New York City. For a while he worked selling advertising space for Ziff-Davis computer publications. He then changed companies to Billboard Magazine and became associate publisher. He and his wife Liz Maihock Beloff moved to Los Angeles where they become regulars at the monthly Rose Bowl Flea Market. Having admired his father-in-law's skills on the ukulele, he purchased a used Martin tenor ukulele at the market and quickly fell in love with the instrument.

Many credit Beloff with being the driving force behind the recent resurgence of the ukulele.

== Flea Market Music ==
Not finding any current music available for the ukulele, Beloff discovered a dealers' cache of unused music from decades earlier. With this reference material he and his wife, Liz, published Jumpin' Jim's Ukulele Favorites in 1992. Its success spawned a series of music books for the ukulele. Beloff expanded into DVDs as well, quitting his job at Billboard, he and his wife created Flea Market Music, Inc. The rise in popularity of the ukulele, and the company's sales, have continued to grow with over 600,000 Jumpin' Jim's books in print. The company offers over two dozen music books covering many genres.

Beloff's 1997 book The Ukulele: A Visual History lays out the history of the instrument with dozens of photographs of ukuleles and ukulele related memorabilia. George Harrison liked the book so much that he wrote an endorsement and sent out copies to all his friends one Christmas.

Beloff has also written a concerto for ukulele and symphony orchestra entitled "Uke Can't Be Serious." It debuted with The Wallingford Symphony Orchestra in 1999, conducted by Phil Ventre, and has been performed regularly since. The concerto was played by Beloff and the Choate Rosemary Hall Orchestra in Germany and Austria in June, 2016.

== The Magic Fluke Company ==
Finding the availability of good ukuleles to be rather limited, Beloff was interested in developing an inexpensive, quality instrument. This inspired his brother-in-law, Dale Webb, an engineer, to design the Fluke and Flea ukuleles. In 1999 Webb and his wife, Phyllis (Jim's sister) formed The Magic Fluke Company. The instruments are made of lightweight, injection molded thermoplastic. The instruments are durable while providing quality sound. The flat bottoms of the designs allow them to stand without any other support. The company has sold over 55,000 instruments since the first prototype. Located in Sheffield, Massachusetts, they use American made parts and materials to produce their instruments using environmentally responsible methods.

The newest addition to the line is the Firefly, a banjolele available with both Soprano or Concert sized neck. In addition, the company now produces an electric ukulele, called the Fluke SB, an electric bass uke, called the Timber (named after the owners' Collie dog), and a violin/fiddle, called the Cricket.

== UKEtopia ==
In 1995, Beloff produced the first annual UKEtopia concert at McCabe's Guitar Shop in Santa Monica, California. The concert was a showcase for local and special guest ukulele players. Among the notable performances in the 1999 concert was Bill Tapia and Lyle Ritz trading jazz licks.

The 5th UKEtopia featured such performers as Ian Whitcomb, Janet Klein, and Peter Brooke Turner of the Ukulele Orchestra of Great Britain as well as the traditional finale of Beloff and his wife leading the audience in song and ukulele playing.

The 10th UKEtopia included two song sets from "Mr. Ukulele," Dan "Soybean" Sawyer, Fred Sokolow and "King Kukulele," and was summarized by Tom Teicholz in The Jewish Journal of Greater Los Angeles.

== Personal life ==
Beloff and his wife, Elizabeth "Liz" Maihock married in 1987 and live in Connecticut. They continue to travel to promote the ukulele and their products, visiting ukulele festivals, giving performances and conducting workshops throughout the US and Canada.

== Books ==
- Jumpin' Jim's Ukulele Favorites, Flea Market Music, Inc., (1992) ISBN 978-0-7935-2050-3
- Jumpin' Jim's Ukulele Tips 'N' Tunes: A Beginner's Method & Songbook, Flea Market Music, Inc., (1994) ISBN 978-0-7935-3377-0
- Jumpin' Jim's Ukulele Gems, Flea Market Music, Inc. (1995) ISBN 978-0-7935-5796-7
- Jumpin' Jim's Ukulele Christmas, Flea Market Music, Inc. (1998) ISBN 978-0-7935-9486-3
- Jumpin' Jim's Gone Hawaiian, Flea Market Music, Inc., (1999) ISBN 978-0-634-00934-1
- Jumpin' Jim's '60s Uke-In, Flea Market Music, Inc. (1999) ISBN 978-0-634-00631-9
- Jumpin' Jim's Camp Ukulele, Flea Market Music, Inc. (2000) ISBN 978-0-634-01850-3
- Jumpin' Jim's Ukulele Beach Party, Flea Market Music, Inc., (2001) ISBN 978-0-634-03425-1
- Jumpin' Jim's Ukulele Masters: Lyle Ritz, Flea Market Music, Inc. (2001) ISBN 978-0-634-02764-2
- Jumpin' Jim's Ukulele Masters: Lyle Ritz Solos: 15 Chord Solos Arranged by the Ukulele Jazz Master, Flea Market Music, Inc. (2002) ISBN 978-0-634-04658-2
- Jumpin' Jim's Ukulele Masters: Herb Ohta, Flea Market Music, Inc., (2002) ISBN 978-0-634-03863-1
- Jumpin' Jim's Ukulele Spirit, Flea Market Music, Inc. (2002) ISBN 978-0-634-04618-6
- Jumpin' Jim's Gone Hollywood, Flea Market Music, Inc. (2003) ISBN 978-0-634-06218-6
- The Ukulele: A Visual History, Backbeat Books, (2d Ed 2003) ISBN 978-0-87930-758-5
- Jumpin' Jim's Ukulele Masters: John King, The Classical Ukulele, Flea Market Music, Inc. (2004) ISBN 0-634-07979-4
- Jumpin' Jim's Ukulele Island, Flea Market Music, Inc. (2004) ISBN 978-0-634-07980-1
- Jumpin' Jim's The Bari Best, Flea Market Music, Inc. (2005) ISBN 978-1-4234-0706-5
- Jumpin' Jim's Ukulele Country, Flea Market Music, Inc., (2005) ISBN 978-1-4234-0122-3
- Jumpin' Jim's Happy Holidays, Flea Market Music, Inc. (2006) ISBN 978-1-4234-2249-5
- Ukulele Fretboard Roadmaps, Fred Sokolow/Jim Beloff, Hal Leonard Corp, (2006) ISBN 978-1-4234-0041-7
- Jumpin' Jim's Ukulele Masters: Lyle Lite: 16 Easy Chord Solos Arranged by Ukulele Jazz Master Lyle Ritz, Flea Market Music, Inc. (2008) ISBN 978-1-4234-3781-9
- Blues Ukulele, arr. By Fred Sokolow, Flea Market Music, Inc. (2008) ISBN 978-1-4234-6572-0
- Elvis Presley for Ukulele, Hal Leonard Corp (2009) ISBN 978-1-4234-6556-0
- Disney Songs For Ukulele, Hal Leonard Corporation, (2010) ISBN 978-1-4234-9560-4
- Bluegrass Ukulele, arr. By Fred Sokolow, Flea Market Music, Inc. (2010) ISBN 978-1-4234-9316-7
- The Daily Ukulele, Hal Leonard Corporation and Flea Market Music, Inc, (2010) ISBN 978-1-4234-7775-4
- Rodgers & Hammerstein For Ukulele, Hal Leonard Corp. (2011) ISBN 978-1-61780-386-4
- From Lute To Uke, arr. By Tony Mizen, Flea Market Music, Inc. (2011) ISBN 978-1-4584-0651-4
- Broadway Classics For Ukulele, Hal Leonard Corp. (2012) ISBN 978-1-4584-1565-3
- The Baroque Ukulele, arr. By Tony Mizen, Flea Market Music, Inc. (2012) ISBN 978-1-4768-1520-6
- The Daily Ukulele Leap Year Edition, Hal Leonard Corporation and Flea Market Music, (2012) ISBN 978-1-4584-8268-6
- The Daily Ukulele: Baritone Edition, Hal Leonard Corporation and Flea Market Music, (2013) ISBN 978-1-4803-5200-1
- Jazzing Up The Ukulele, Fred Sokolow (2015) ISBN 978-1-4803-9528-2
- The Romantic Ukulele, Tony Mizen, Flea Market Music,(2015) ISBN 978-1-4950-2254-8
- The Daily Ukulele To Go, Hal Leonard Corporation and Flea Market Music, Inc., (2015) ISBN 978-1-4803-4227-9
- The Daily Ukulele: Leap Year Edition for Baritone Ukulele, Hal Leonard Corporation and Flea Market Music, Inc., (2017) ISBN 978-1-4950-8595-6
- Jumpin' Jim's Ukulele Masters: James Hill — Duets For One, Flea Market Music, Inc.,(2017) ISBN 978-1-5400-0304-1
- UKEtopia-Adventures in the Ukulele World, Backbeat Books, (November 2021) ISBN 978-1-4930-6100-6
- The Daily Ukulele: Another Year, Hal Leonard Corporation and Flea Market Music, (October 2024) ISBN 978-1-7051-8767-8
- The Daily Ukulele: Another Year for Baritone Ukulele, Hal Leonard Corporation and Flea Market Music, Expected Release Summer 2026
- The Daily Ukulele: Christmas Edition, Hal Leonard Corporation and Flea Market Music, Expected Release Fall 2026

== Discography ==
- Jim Beloff, Jim's Dog Has Fleas, Flea Market Music, 1993
- Legends Of Ukulele, (producer), Rhino Records, 1998
- Jim Beloff For The Love Of Uke, Flea Market Music, 1998
- Lyle Ritz, Herb Ohta: A Night Of Ukulele Jazz, (producer) Flea Market Music, 2001
- Various Artists, The Finer Things, The Songs Of Herb Ohta & Jim Beloff, Flea Market Music, 2004
- Lyle Ritz, No Frills, (producer) Flea Market Music 2006
- Various Artists, Paradise Lost & Found, Flea Market Music, 2007
- Liz & Jim Beloff, Rare Air, Flea Market Music, 2009
- Dreams I Left In Pockets: 33 Songs By Jim Beloff 2-CD set, Flea Market Music, 2014 (FMM-1009)
- Two Ukulele Concertos, Flea Market Music, 2018 (FMM-1010)
- The Wind And Sun, Flea Market Music, 2020 (FMM 1011)
- mid-century modern, Flea Market Music, 2025 (FMM 1012)

== DVD ==
- The Joy of Uke - Volume 1, Homespun Tapes 1998
- The Joy of Uke - Volume 2: Moving Beyond the Basics, Homespun Tapes, 2003 ISBN 978-1-932537-27-7
- Lyle's Style: Ukulele Master Lyle Ritz Shares A Lifetime Of Performance Techniques, (producer) Flea Market Music 2009
- Jumpin' Jim's Ukulele Workshop, Homespun, 2011, ASIN: B0057CONAO
