= Spain (instrumental) =

1971 jazz composition by Chick Corea

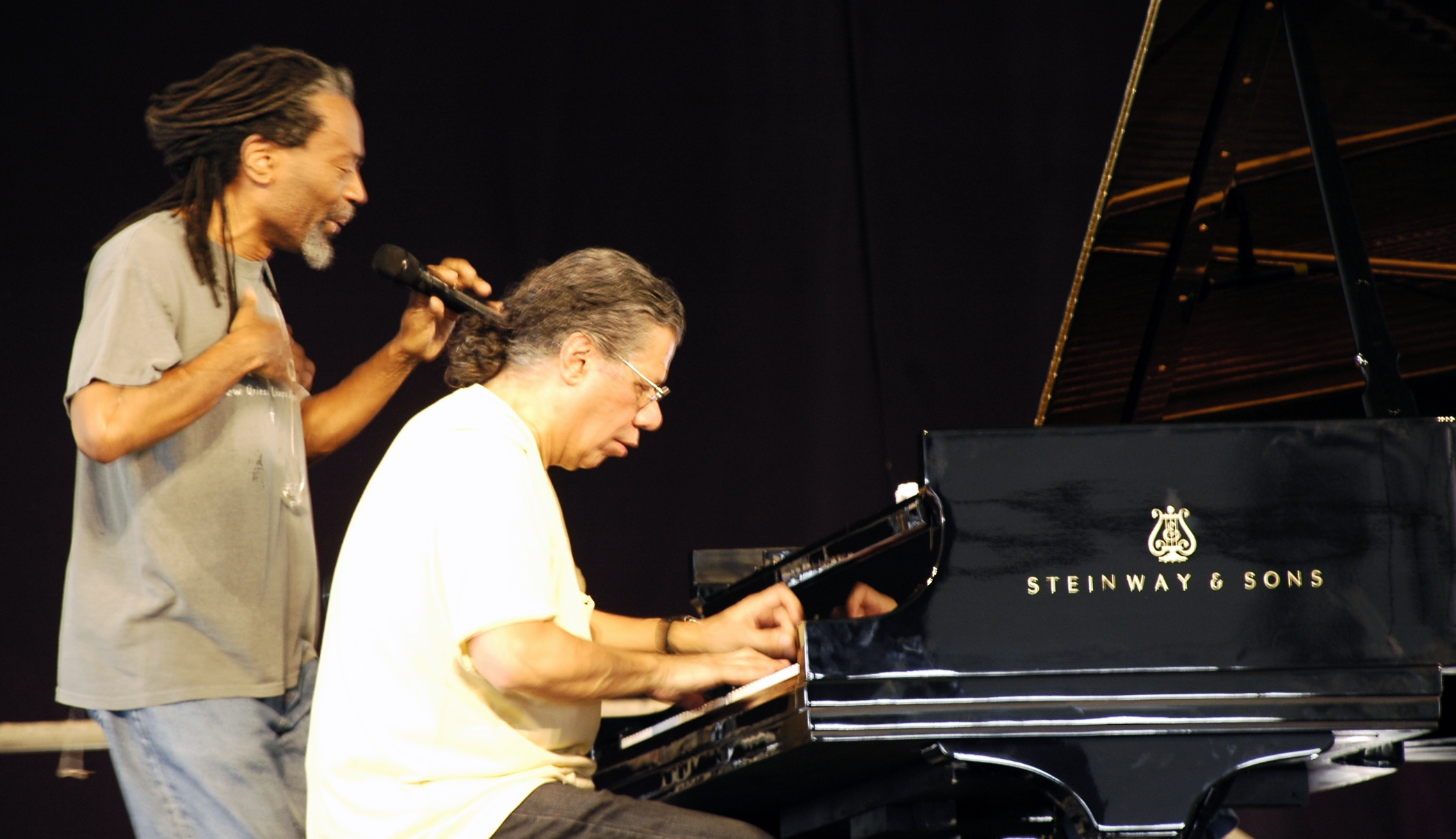
Bobby McFerrin and Chick Corea at the New Orleans Jazz Fest 2007

"Spain" is an instrumental jazz fusion composition by jazz pianist and composer Chick Corea. It is likely Corea's most recognized piece, and is considered a jazz standard.

"Spain" was composed in 1971 and appeared in its original (and best-known) rendition on the album Light as a Feather, with performances by Corea (Rhodes electric piano), Airto Moreira (drums), Flora Purim (vocals and percussion), Stanley Clarke (bass), and Joe Farrell (flute). It has been recorded in several versions, by Corea himself as well as by other artists, including a flamenco version by Paco de Lucía, Al Di Meola and John McLaughlin in the 1980s, and a progressive bluegrass version by Béla Fleck in 1979. A version with lyrics by Al Jarreau, "Spain (I Can Recall)", appeared on the 1980 album This Time. In 2007, Corea recorded a piano duet version with jazz pianist Hiromi Uehara that was released on their collaborative album Duet. A version of "Spain" was performed by Stevie Wonder at his 2008 Concert in London. The introduction used in the song is from Concierto de Aranjuez, a guitar concerto by the Spanish composer Joaquín Rodrigo.

The Light as a Feather version of "Spain" received two Grammy nominations, for Best Instrumental Arrangement and for Best Instrumental Jazz Performance by a Group. In 2001, Corea was awarded the Best Instrumental Arrangement Grammy for "Spain for Sextet and Orchestra".

== Composition ==
Corea opens the Light as a Feather version of "Spain" with the adagio from Joaquin Rodrigo's Concierto de Aranjuez.

Corea took inspiration from Spanish flamenco guitarist Paco de Lucia for this piece.

After the intro, the song switches to a fast, steady samba-like rhythm, in which the main theme and an improvisation part are repeated.

Beginning of Spain

The chord progression used during the improvisation part is based on harmonic progressions in Rodrigo's concerto. It runs as follows:

 | Gmaj7 | F#7 | Em7 A7 | Dmaj7 (Gmaj7) | C#7 F#7 | Bm B7 |

== Appearances ==
By Chick Corea

- Light as a Feather (1972) – Chick Corea and Return to Forever
- Akoustic Band (1989) – Chick Corea Akoustic Band
- Play (1990) – Chick Corea and Bobby McFerrin
- Return to the Seventh Galaxy: The Anthology (CD 1996) – Chick Corea, Bill Connors, Stanley Clarke, and Lenny White
- Alexia In a Jazz Mood (1996) – Chick Corea and Alexia Vassiliou
- Solo Piano: Originals (2000) – Chick Corea
- Corea.Concerto (2001) – Chick Corea with Origin and the London Philharmonic Orchestra
- Rendezvous in New York (CD 2003, DVD 2005) – Chick Corea Akoustic Band
- Elektric Band: Live at Montreux 2004 (2004) – Chick Corea Elektric Band
- Akoustic Band 1991 (DVD 2005) – Chick Corea Akoustic Band
- Duet (2009) – Chick Corea and Hiromi Uehara
- Trilogy (2013) – Chick Corea with Christian McBride and Brian Blade

Covers

- Manhattan Wildlife Refuge (1974) – Bill Watrous
- Live and Improvised (1976) – Blood Sweat & Tears
- Something You Got (1977) – Art Farmer
- Two for the Road (1977) – Larry Coryell & Steve Khan
- Crossing the Tracks (1979) – Béla Fleck
- This Time (1980) – Al Jarreau
- Le Beirut (1984) – Fairuz
- Live With Vic Juris (1985) – Bireli Lagrene
- Jaco Pastorius & Bireli Lagrene & Alex Bally (1985) – Bireli Lagrene and Jaco Pastorius
- New Weave (1986) – Rare Silk
- Somewhere Out There (1986) – Airmen of Note
- Naurava Kulkuri (1986) – Vesa-Matti Loiri
- Sensacion (1987) – Tito Puente
- Daybreak (1987) – Béla Fleck
- Thousand Wave (1988) – Takahiro Matsumoto
- Casiopea ft. Toshinobu Kubota in Music Party (1989) – Casiopea and Toshinobu Kubota
- GRP All-Star Big Band (1992) – GRP All-Star Big Band
- Rosenberg Trio: Live at the North Sea Jazz Festival (1993) – Rosenberg Trio
- Ng La banda (Cuba) Montreaux Jazz Festival 1993
- Zlatko (1995) – Zlatko Manojlović
- DGQ-20 (1996) – David Grisman Quintet
- Two Guitars One Passion (1996) – Lara & Reyes
- Tango del Fuego (1999) – James Galway
- Czechmate (1999) – Druha Trava
- Spain (2000) – Michel Camilo & Tomatito
- La Nuit Des Gitans (2001) – Raphael Fays
- Tribute album (2001) – Emilie-Claire Barlow
- Crosscurrent (2005) – Jake Shimabukuro
- Gently Weeps (2006) – Jake Shimabukuro
- Steps (2009) – Cluster
- Live at Last (2008) – Stevie Wonder
- The Chick Corea Songbook (2009) – The Manhattan Transfer
- Acoustic Live (2009) – Pegasus (Issei Noro and Tetsuo Sakurai)
- Jazz and the Philharmonic – Chick Corea, Eric Owens, Terence Blanchard, and the Henry Mancini Institute Orchestra
- Kind of Spain (2017) – Wolfgang Haffner
- Spain (2017) – Groove for Thought
- Spain (2019) – The String Queens
- Spain (2020) – Dewa 19
- Spain (2020) – Jesus Molina
