= Jake Shimabukuro =

American musician (born 1976)

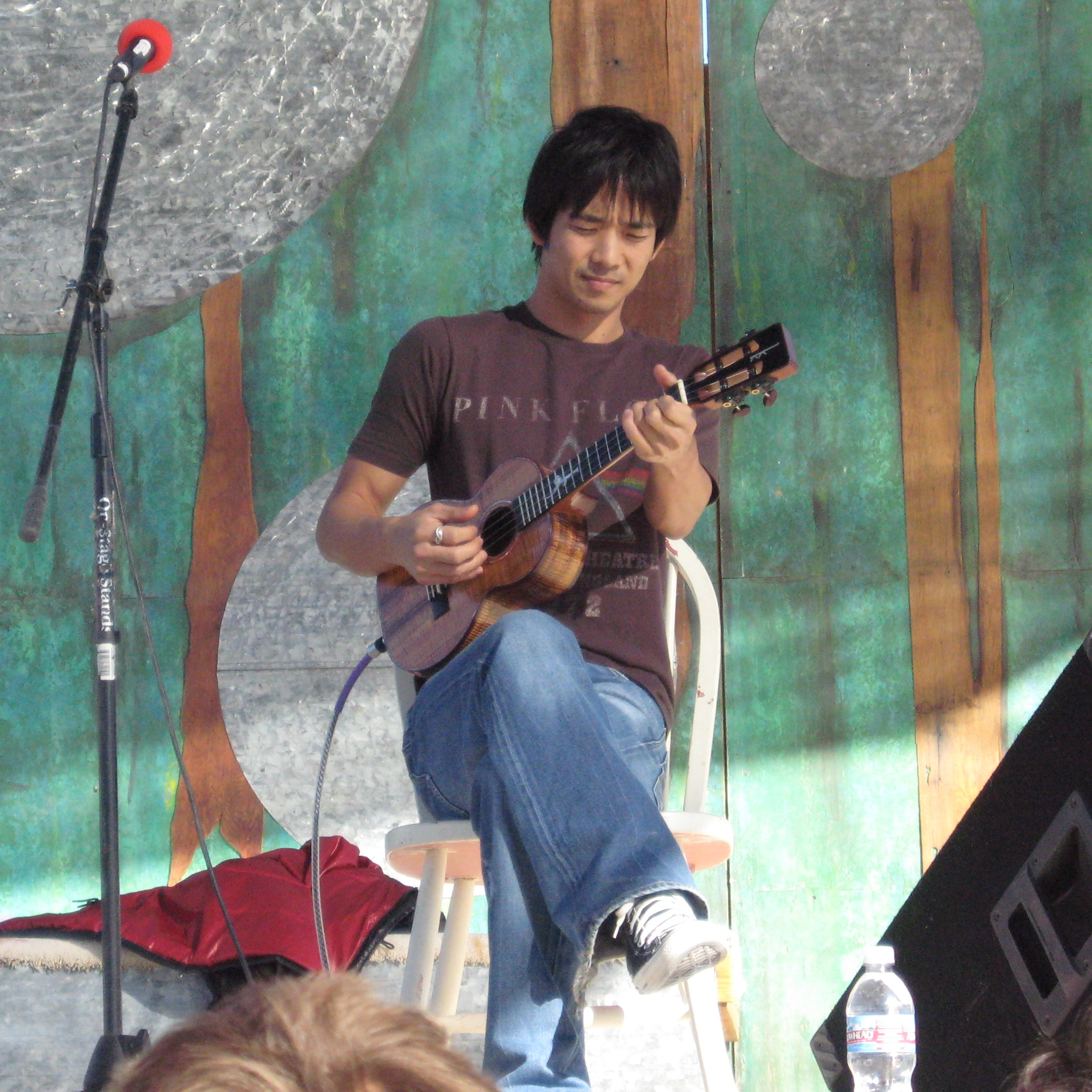
- Jake Shimabukuro performing in Joshua Tree, California, in 2007

Background information
- Born: November 3, 1976 (age 50); Honolulu, Hawai’i, U.S.
- Genres: Jazz; blues; funk; rock; classical; bluegrass; folk; flamenco
- Instrument: Ukulele
- Years active: 1998–present
- Labels: Sony; Hitchhike; Music Theories Recordings
- Website: www.jakeshimabukuro.com

Jake Shimabukuro (born November 3, 1976) is an American ukulele player and composer from Hawaii (Note: Local usage generally reserves Hawaiian as an ethnonym referring to Native Hawaiians. Hawaii resident or from Hawaii is the preferred local form to refer to state residents in general regardless of ethnicity. Hawaii may also be used adjectivally. The AP Stylebook also prescribes this usage.) known for his fast and complex finger work. His music combines elements of jazz, blues, funk, rock, bluegrass, classical, folk, and flamenco. Shimabukuro has written numerous original compositions, including the entire soundtracks to two Japanese films, Hula Girls (2007) and Sideways (2009), the Japanese remake of the American film of the same name.

Well known in Hawai’i and Japan during his early solo career in the early 2000s, Shimabukuro became famous internationally in 2006, when a video of him playing a virtuosic rendition of "While My Guitar Gently Weeps" was posted on YouTube without his knowledge and became one of the first viral videos on that site. His concert engagements, collaborations with well-known musicians, media appearances, and music production have snowballed since then. In 2012, an award-winning documentary was released tracking his life, career, and music, titled Jake Shimabukuro: Life on Four Strings; it has screened in a variety of festivals, aired repeatedly on PBS, and been released on DVD.

== Career ==
=== Early training and career as a band member ===
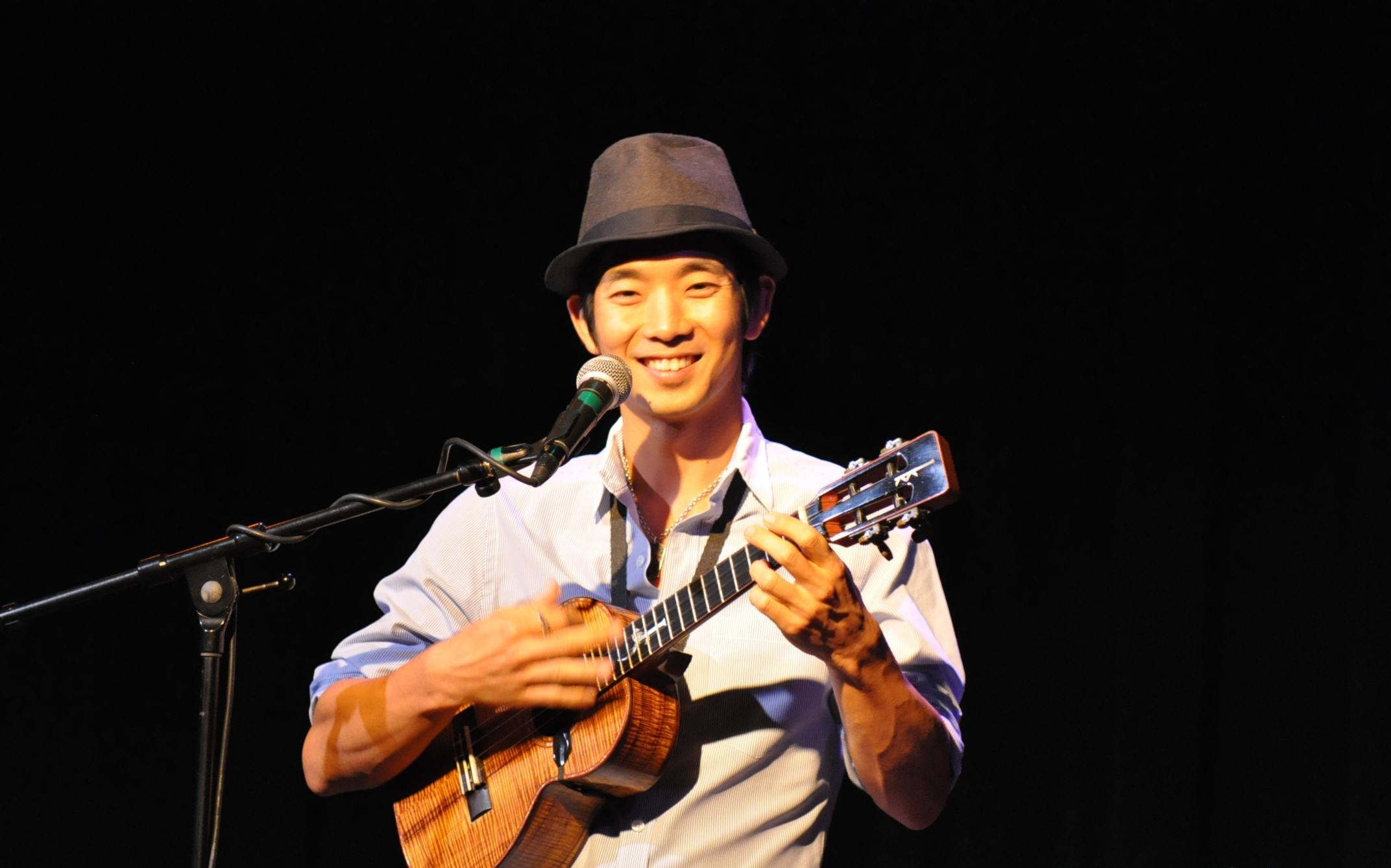
In concert 2010

Shimabukuro was born in Honolulu, Hawaii, a fifth-generation descendant of Japanese and Okinawans who immigrated to Hawaii. His mother gave him a ukulele at age four and he quickly took an interest in the instrument, playing it many hours a day. His mother, an accomplished ukulele player and singer, was his first teacher, and he also took lessons for seven years under Tami Akiyami at Roy Sakuma Studios.

Shimabukuro initially gained attention in Hawaii in 1998 as a member of Pure Heart, a trio with Lopaka Colón (percussion) and Jon Yamasato (guitar/vocals). Shimabukuro was working at a music store in Honolulu when the group released its eponymous first album, which won them four Na Hoku Hanohano Awards (the Hawaiian counterpart of the Grammy Awards) from the Hawaii Academy of Recording Arts: Island Contemporary Album of the Year, Most Promising Artist(s), Album of the Year, and Favorite Entertainment of the Year, the latter determined by unrestricted public vote. The album, Pure Heart, was also named one of the Top 50 Hawaiian albums of all time by Honolulu Magazine.

The following year, they released Pure Heart 2, which earned them another Hoku award for Island Contemporary Album of the Year. Yamasato left the group, and Shimabukuro and Colón formed another group, Colón, named in honor of Colón's father, famed percussionist Augie Colón. The new guitarist/vocalist to replace Yamasato was Guy Cruz, and Andrew McLellan joined on bass. The new group Colón released one album, The Groove Machine (2000), and won the Hoku Award for Favorite Entertainer of the Year in 2001.

=== Solo career ===
==== Signing with Sony Japan ====
Shimabukuro decided to pursue a solo career as Colón disbanded in early 2002. With the help of his newly acquired manager, Japanese native Kazusa Flanagan, in June 2002 he became the first Hawaii artist to sign a recording contract with Epic Records International, a division of Sony Music Japan International. Shimabukuro toured extensively in Japan – a practice he still continues – and from the start his albums received extensive airplay on various Japanese radio stations. He has also released numerous Japan-only CDs: Skyline (2002), Haruyo Koi (2007), Yeah (2008), Ichigo Ichie (2008), Annon (2009), The Music of Sideways (2009), Across the Universe (2009), Aloha To You (2011), Ukulele X: 10th Anniversary Collection (2011), Ukulele Disney (2012). In 2008, a 120-page biographical photo-book on Shimabukuro was published in Japan.

Sony Japan, however, only releases Shimabukuro's music in Japan, and to release the music in Hawaii, he created the Hitchhike Records label. Between 2002 and 2005, Shimabukuro released four U.S. albums as a solo performer: Sunday Morning (2002), Crosscurrent (2003), Walking Down Rainhill (2004), and Dragon (2005). All of them except Dragon won both Na Hoku Awards and Hawaii Music Awards, and Dragon won the Hawaii Music Award for Best Rock Album and peaked at #5 on Billboard's Top World Music Albums in 2005. As a solo artist, Shimabukuro experimented with using effect pedals to make new sounds that few would associate with an ukulele.

In 2005, he secured a nationwide U.S. distribution deal for his Hitchhike Records label, which had previously been confined to the Hawaii market. In 2005 he also did his first nationwide mainland U.S. concert tour, and released a DVD of instructional segments, concert footage, and interviews called Play Loud Ukulele.

==== Breakout success ====
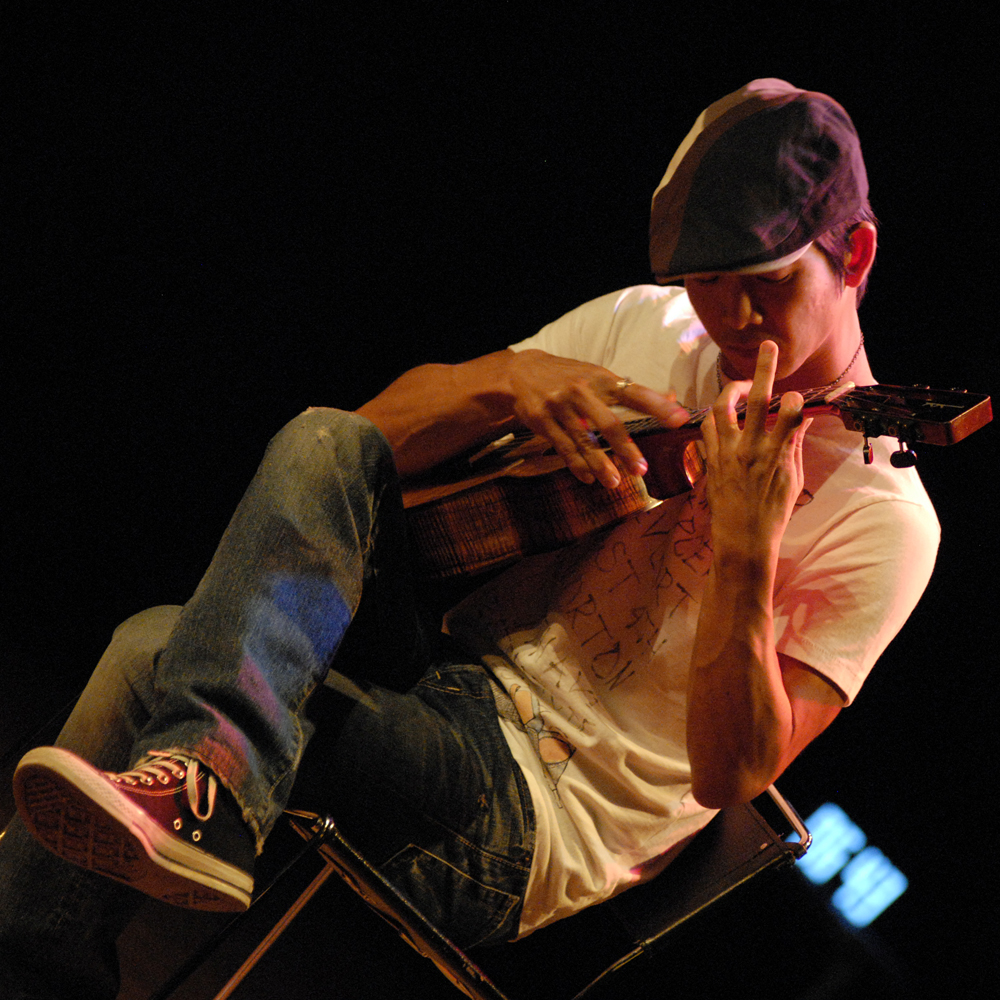
Performing at Stockholm Jazz Festival 2009

In April 2006, Shimabukuro came to national and international attention when, unbeknownst to him, someone posted a virtuosic video of him playing George Harrison's "While My Guitar Gently Weeps" on YouTube. The video, which had originally been filmed for a New York television show called Midnight Ukulele Disco, quickly went viral, and has received over 17 million views. The video performance resulted in a huge increase in concert engagements, and Shimabukuro received collaboration requests from notable musicians including Jimmy Buffett, Béla Fleck, Ziggy Marley, Cyndi Lauper, Keali'i Reichel, and Yo-Yo Ma. He toured with Buffett in 2005, 2006 and 2007, and is featured on several of Buffett's albums and videos, including his 2007 CD/DVD release Live in Anguilla. Shimabukuro also began receiving many invitations to perform on major U.S. talk shows and other well-known media ventures, and began touring worldwide eight or nine months a year.

Shimabukuro released his fifth U.S. album, Gently Weeps, in September 2006. The album peaked at #2 on Billboard's Top World Music Albums in 2006, and won the 2007 Na Hoku Hanohano Award for Instrumental Album of the Year. Also in 2006, he composed the music to the Japanese film Hula Girls, which featured hula dancing and a Hawaiian spa resort as its primary theme and setting.

In 2009, Shimabukuro released his concert CD, Live, which captures him in performance at various venues around the world: New York, Chicago, Japan, and Hawaii. It peaked at number 5 in Billboard's Top World Music Albums in 2009 and 2010, won the Hoku for Instrumental Album of the Year, garnered Shimabukuro the award for Favorite Entertainer of the Year, and won the Hawaii Music Award for Best Ukulele Album. In November 2009, he accompanied fellow Hawaii-born Bette Midler at the Royal Variety Performance. They performed a rendition of the Beatles song "In My Life" as the first of Midler's three-song set, and afterwards they met Queen Elizabeth and shook her hand.

==== 2011 to present ====
Peace Love Ukulele, Shimabukuro's 2011 CD, reached #1 in Billboard's Top World Music Albums in 2011 and 2012. It won the 2012 Na Hoku Hanohano Award for Instrumental Album of the Year, and also garnered Shimabukuro the Na Hoku Hanohano award for Favorite Entertainer of the Year. Shimabukuro created an original piece "Ukulele Five-O" as part of the soundtrack for the new Hawaii Five-0 television series. He capped off 2011 with several live performances on the New Year's Eve episode of A Prairie Home Companion, broadcast live from Hawaii.

Shimabukuro's 2012 album, Grand Ukulele, was produced by music producer/engineer Alan Parsons, at Parsons' request. It features a 29-piece orchestra and a rhythm section, with the ukulele soloing, and was recorded live with no over-dubbing. The album has reached #2 in Billboard's Top World Music Albums.

In 2012, a one-hour documentary film about Shimabukuro's life and career was released, titled Jake Shimabukuro: Life on Four Strings. The film won the Audience Award for Best Documentary at the Ashland Independent Film Festival, the Audience Award for Best Documentary Film and the Best Editor award at the Los Angeles Asian Pacific Film Festival, the Honorable Mention for Best Documentary Feature at the Urbanworld Film Festival, and the Best Medium Length/Essay Award at the DocuWest International Documentary Film Festival. The film aired nationally on PBS in May 2013. It was released on DVD July 2013.

On February 14, 2020, Shimabukuro released his album Trio through Music Theories Recordings, which landed at No. 1 on Billboard's Contemporary Jazz Albums chart. That same year Shimabukuro announced his latest studio project, Jake & Friends, but its release was delayed due to the COVID-19 pandemic. On September 9, 2021, he released the first two songs from the album: "Two High" with Moon Taxi, and "Stardust" with Willie Nelson. The full album was released on November 12, 2021, and also features collaborations with Bette Midler, Warren Haynes, and more.

On June 23, 2021, Shimabukuro was nominated by president Joe Biden to be a Member of the National Council on the Arts.

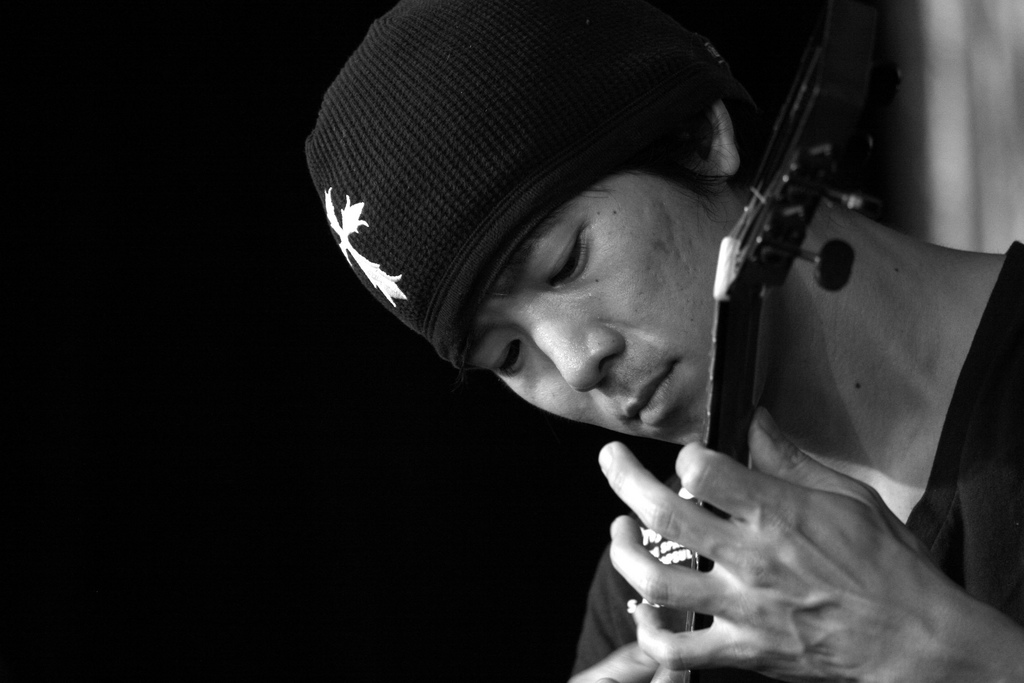
Jake Shimabukuro at the Blue Mountains Music Festival (Katoomba, NSW, Australia) March 2008

== Media appearances ==
Shimabukuro has appeared and performed in a number of media outlets, including Late Night with Conan O'Brien (2005, 2008), Jimmy Kimmel Live! (twice in 2011), Last Call With Carson Daly (2007), The Today Show (2013), Musicians@Google, and several TED conferences including TED2010, TEDxSanDiego, TEDxTokyo, TEDxHongKong, and TEDxHonolulu. He has been featured on A Prairie Home Companion, NPR’s Morning Edition and World Cafe, Public Radio International’s The World, Whad'Ya Know?, PRX's Echoes, and The Bob Edwards Show on XM Satellite Radio.

Shimabukuro was featured on the January 15, 2012, episode of CNN's The Next List. In March 2012 the documentary by Tadashi Nakamura on his life and career was released, Jake Shimabukuro: Life on Four Strings, and it subsequently aired repeatedly on PBS.

== Instruments ==
Shimabukuro plays a custom-made 4 string tenor ukulele from Kamaka Ukulele. Early in his career he experimented with the use of effect pedals, but since around 2011, has relied on the natural sounds of the ukulele and avoided sound manipulation. For his Grand Ukulele Tour, he has added the use of a couple of effects pedals to his show. One of them is used to take a sound sample that he loops and accompanies.

== Charity ==
Shimabukuro was for many years the key spokesperson and then also director of the Music Is Good Medicine non-profit organization. It used community outreach programs and performance visits to schools, senior centers, and hospitals to promote healing and encourage a healthy lifestyle and a connection to music. He has also done several performances in tsunami-devastated Sendai, Japan, in order to bring peace and respite to the distraught and newly homeless residents' lives.

Following the dissolution of the Music Is Good Medicine program, Shimabukuro founded his own non-profit organization, the Four Strings Foundation, in 2013. It creates music education workshops nationwide and provides ukuleles, materials, and training tools to schools and music teachers. It also hosts concerts and publishes music media, lobbies to increase music education, encourages schools to make music programs culturally relevant, conducts research in music education and children's social/emotional learning, and provides funding for music education in schools nationwide.

Shimabukuro stated: "The Four Strings Foundation was created as a vehicle to give people opportunities to make a difference. My primary focus is to inspire kids through music to help them discover their passion in life. The message is simple – strive to be the best, live drug-free and have fun." The mission statement of Four Strings is: "To create new opportunities for people of all ages to participate in the act of making music and to use those experiences as a vehicle to promote personal empowerment and fulfillment."

In 2025, he partnered with The Good Tidings Foundation to revamp the music room of Washington Middle School, where he attended.

== Personal life ==
Shimabukuro married OB/GYN physician Kelly Yamasato in May 2011. They have a son, Chase, born in August 2012.

Jake's brother, Bruce Shimabukuro, is also a well known ukulele player in his own right; he teaches ukulele and has released albums of his own. Bruce accompanies his brother on guitar on a track on My Life, and composed one of the tracks, "Ukulele Bros.," on Peace Love Ukulele.

== Awards ==
=== Na Hoku Hanohano Awards ===
Pure Heart member

- 1999 Na Hoku Hanohano Awards: Pure Heart – Best Album of the Year
- 1999 Na Hoku Hanohano Awards: Pure Heart – Island Contemporary Album of the Year
- 1999 Na Hoku Hanohano Awards: Most Promising Artist (Pure Heart)
- 1999 Na Hoku Hanohano Awards: Favorite Entertainer of the Year (Pure Heart)
- 2000 Na Hoku Hanohano Awards: Pure Heart 2 – Contemporary Album of the Year

Colón member

- 2001 Na Hoku Hanohano Awards: Favorite Entertainer of the Year (Colón)

Solo artist

- 2003 Na Hoku Hanohano Awards: Sunday Morning – Instrumental Album of the Year
- 2003 Na Hoku Hanohano Awards: Favorite Entertainer of the Year
- 2004 Na Hoku Hanohano Awards: Crosscurrent – Instrumental Album of the Year
- 2005 Na Hoku Hanohano Awards: Walking Down Rainhill – Instrumental Album of the Year
- 2006 Na Hoku Hanohano Awards: Favorite Entertainer of the Year
- 2007 Na Hoku Hanohano Awards: Gently Weeps – Instrumental Album of the Year
- 2010 Na Hoku Hanohano Awards: Live – Instrumental Album of the Year
- 2010 Na Hoku Hanohano Awards: Favorite Entertainer of the Year
- 2012 Na Hoku Hanohano Awards: Peace Love Ukulele – Instrumental Album of the Year
- 2012 Na Hoku Hanohano Awards: Favorite Entertainer of the Year

=== Hawaii Music Awards ===
Pure Heart

- 1999 Hawaii Music Awards: New Artist of the Year (Pure Heart)
- 1999 Hawaii Music Awards: "Koke'e" – Best Music Video (Pure Heart) (4 winners)
- 2000 Hawaii Music Awards: Pure Heart 2.5 – Best Seasonal Album (Pure Heart)

Solo artist

- 2002 Hawaii Music Awards: Mahalo Award, Studio Musician of the Year
- 2002 Hawaii Music Awards: "Ehime Maru" – Best Single Recording
- 2003 Hawaii Music Awards: Sunday Morning – Instrumental Hawaiian Album of the Year
- 2004 Hawaii Music Awards: Entertainer of the Year
- 2004 Hawaii Music Awards: Crosscurrent – Album of the Year
- 2004 Hawaii Music Awards: Crosscurrent – Instrumental Hawaiian Album of the Year
- 2005 Hawaii Music Awards: Walking Down Rainhill – Best Ukulele Album
- 2005 Hawaii Music Awards: Play Loud Ukulele – DVD of the Year, 2nd Place
- 2006 Hawaii Music Awards: Dragon – Best Rock Album
- 2008 Hawaii Music Awards: My Life – Best Ukulele Album
- 2008 Hawaii Music Awards: Hula Girls – Best Film Score
- 2010 Hawaii Music Awards: Live – Best Ukulele Album

== CDs ==
with Pure Heart

- Pure Heart (1999)
- Pure Heart 2 (1999)
- Pure Heart 2.5 (1999) (Christmas album)

with Colón

- The Groove Machine (2000)

Solo career

- Sunday Morning (2002)
- Crosscurrent (2003)
- Walking Down Rainhill (2004)
- Dragon (2005)
- Gently Weeps (2006)
- Hula Girls (2007) (film soundtrack)
- My Life (2007)
- Live (2009)
- Peace Love Ukulele (2011)
- Grand Ukulele (2012)
- Travels (2015)
- Live in Japan (2016)
- Nashville Sessions (2016)
- The Greatest Day (2018)
- Trio (2020)
- Jake & Friends (2021)
- Grateful (2023)

Japan-only releases

- Skyline (2002)
- Haruyo Koi (2007)
- Yeah (2008)
- Ichigo Ichie (2008)
- Annon (2009)
- The Music of Sideways (2009) (film soundtrack to Sideways, the 2009 Japanese remake of the same name, composed by Shimabukuro)
- Across the Universe (2009)
- Aloha To You (2011)
- Ukulele X: 10th Anniversary Collection (2011)
- Ukulele Disney (2012)

== DVDs ==
- Play Loud Ukulele (2005) (instructional, concerts, interviews)
- Million Miles Away (2005) (concert performance)
- Jake Shimabukuro: Life on Four Strings (2012) (documentary film featuring Shimabukuro)

== Books ==
- Shimabukuro, Jake. Peace Love Ukulele. Hal Leonard Corporation, 2012. ISBN 978-1458413772 (songbook transcriptions with ukulele tablature)
- Shimabukuro, Jake. The Name of the Wind: Portrait of Jake Shimabukuro. Kodansha, 2008. ISBN 978-4062148078 (Japanese biographical photobook)
