= Herb Ohta =

- Born: 1934 (age 91–92); Hawaii
- Occupation: Musician
- Instrument: Ukulele
- Years active: 1950s–present

Herb Ohta aka Ohta-san is an American Ukulele player born in 1934 in Hawaii who has recorded solo, as a group and with Andre Popp on the A&M Records label, which was co-owned by Herb Alpert and Jerry Moss. He is also known as "Ohta-san" in Japan and other Asian countries, which is a title of respect for the musician.

== Biography ==
Ohta was a boy when he was taught his first three chords on the ukulele by his mother. He entered an amateur contest at age 9 and won the $10 first prize. Three years later he met Eddie Kamae on the beach, at the time considered the best ukulele player in the world, and became his student. He graduated from Saint Louis School and the University of Hawaiʻi at Mānoa.

He enlisted in the US Marine Corps and served ten years from 1953 to 1963. While stationed in Japan as an interpreter, Ohta made his first recordings and played a number of events. He was a guest on the Ed Sullivan Show in 1955.

In 1964 he succeeded in having a hit song with the single Sushi and signed a five-year contract with Decca Records.

Among Ohta-san's students was Roy Sakuma, who founded the Annual Hawaiian Ukulele Festival.

He is recognized by many as the world's most diversified Ukulele player. He has recorded music that is categorized as Pop Music, Romantic Music, Jazz, Traditional Hawaiian music and with orchestras. He was inducted into the Ukulele Hall of Fame in 2006.

The first collaboration for Herb Ohta and Andre Popp was released in the US by A&M Records. The album entitled "Song For Anna", was released in 1973 and sold more than 6 million copies internationally. The single of “Song For Anna” peaked at number 12 in Australia. The ukulele became a blended and solo voice with the orchestrations that appealed to the romantic side of music. The album was followed by another titled "Feelings" in 1975. He has recorded numerous albums from traditional Hawaiian to Classical, Pop and other genres.

In 2001, Herb Ohta joined forces with Lyle Ritz and released an album titled Night of Ukulele Jazz Live at McCabe's. The two were considered top performers, but had managed to miss each other for decades, though both were familiar with the other's works. Both played Martin Ukuleles for the recording, Ohta playing a standard size, and Ritz a tenor, which he switched off with a tenor Ko'olau.

== Discography ==
- Soul Time in Hawaii, 1966
- Ohta-San's New Thing, 1968
- Ohta-San's Pacific Potpourri, 1970
- Song For Anna, 1973 - AUS #55
- Feelings, 1975
- The Wonderful World of the Ukulele, JVC, 2000
- Night of Ukulele Jazz Live at McCabe's (Lyle Ritz & Herb Ohta), 2001
- Bodysurfing, Roy Sakuma Productions, 2004 ASIN: B000GAPM52
- Swing Time Ohta-San Ukulele Jazz Best Selection, with Herb Ohta, JVC Japan, 2004 ASIN: B00024Z6NA
- Ukulele Bossa Nova (tribute to Antonio Carlos Jobim), Victor Entertainment, Inc., 2007 ASIN: B002OY7OXQ
- Cool Touch- Ohta-San "Herb Ohta" Melodies Vol. 2
- Autumn Leaves, with Lyle Ritz, Victor Entertainment, Inc., 2005 ASIN: B002OY9K5G
- Bach: Ukulele Bach, 2010
- Ukulele Legacy - Herb Ohta, Jr. & Ohta-San, 2012
- The Strains of the Ohta-san's Ukulele SIDE A, 2015
- The Strains of the Ohta-san's Ukulele SIDE B, 2015
- Herb Ohta with Friends Images of Hawaii Vol. 1, 2015
- Herb Ohta with Friends Images of Hawaii Vol. 2, 2015
