= Hawaii Music Awards =

Annual American people's-choice program

The Hawaii Music Awards were an annual people's-choice awards program established in 1996. The awards were organized and managed by the Music Foundation of Hawaii, a nonprofit organization dedicated to promoting the diversity of music in Hawaii and to honoring and acknowledging the talents and achievements of the state's musicians.

The awards program was founded by Johnny Kai, and included various music genres such as Rock, Jazz, Classical, Ska, Punk, Latin, Blues, Reggae, Jawaiian, Polynesian, Exotica, Country Western, and also established Hawaiian genres like Traditional Hawaiian and Contemporary Hawaiian.

The award winners were theoretically selected by the general public although in some years artists affiliated with record labels that were financially sponsoring the awards won in significant numbers. The Hawaii Music Awards implemented the first online interactive voting system developed for the internet.

== See also ==
- Na Hoku Hanohano Awards
- Hawaiian Music Hall of Fame
- Music of Hawaii
