= Nā Hōkū Hanohano Awards =

Premier music awards in Hawaii, US

- Awarded for: Outstanding achievements in Hawaiian music
- Country: United States
- Presented by: Hawai'i Academy of Recording Arts
- First award: 1978
- Website: nahokuhanohano.org

Television/radio coverage
- Network: "K5" (KHNL-DT2)

The Nā Hōkū Hanohano Awards, occasionally called the Nā Hōkū Awards or Hoku Awards, are the premier music awards in Hawaii. They are considered to be Hawaii's equivalent of the Grammy Awards. "Nā Hōkū Hanohano" means "Stars of Distinction" in Hawaiian – "hōkū" means "star", "nā" makes it plural, and "hanohano" means "glorious, worthy of praises". The awards were founded in 1978 by radio personality Krash Kealoha of KCCN-AM, a radio station which focused on traditional Hawaiian music. He launched the first awards with the support of the owner of the radio station Sydney Grayson, and his fellow DJs Kimo Kahoʻāno and Jacqueline “Skylark” Rossetti.

The award winners are currently selected by the voting members of the non-profit Hawaii Academy of Recording Arts, which was founded in 1982. The awards are presented each May, and the ceremony is televised; KITV was the originating station when it started its telecast. The 38th Annual Nā Hōkū Hanohano Awards were held at the Hawaii Convention Center on May 23, 2015. The event was televised live on KFVE-TV in Hawaii and streamed online worldwide on the station's website.

The 42nd annual Nā Hōkū Hanohano Awards were held on Saturday, May 25, 2019 at the Hawaii Convention Center.

== Release eligibility, entry and voting ==
Music recordings must be available for commercial sale through established retailers of physical products (CD and DVD or other media) or through established digital download retailers (such as ITunes, CD Baby, Amazon.com) in order to be eligible for entry in the awards. Recordings that are released during the calendar year (January 1 through December 31) are eligible to be entered in the following year's awards.

Eligibility in most of the award's categories is restricted to Hawaii resident artists and other industry professional, though non-Hawaii U.S. residents are eligible in the Hawaiian, Island Music, Ukulele, Slack Key, Haku Mele, and Hawaiian Language Performance categories. There is a special recognition award for non-U.S. residents who release recordings that prominently feature Hawaiian, Island Music, ukulele, or slack key music.

The Academy solicits entries in fall of the eligibility year, and entries for the awards must be received by January 15 of the year in which the awards will be held. Entrants must complete an online or downloadable entry form and submit copies of the releases to the Academy by that date. Membership in the Academy is not required to enter a release.

The Academy's selection committee assembles a preliminary ballot which is sent to all regular (voting) members, usually in March. The top five vote-getters are tabulated, and the selection committee creates a final ballot, which is also sent to regular members, usually in April. The winners are tabulated by an accounting firm, and remain secret until they are announced at the awards presentation in May.

== Awards categories ==
The Nā Hōkū Hanohano Awards currently present awards in the following categories. A minimum of three eligible releases must be entered in any category in order for that category to be awarded in that year. Unless otherwise noted, eligibility in most categories is restricted to Hawaii residents.

=== General categories ===
- Album of the Year (Artist and Producerʻs Award): Best produced album release
- EP (Extended Play) of the Year: Best release that contains more than three but no more than eight separate tracks, and is of less than 30 minutes in total playing time
- Single of the Year: Best Recorded performance of a song released as a single in either physical (CD) or digital format
- Song of the Year: (Composer’s Award) Best achievement in creating a first–time recorded song including words and music
- Instrumental Song of the Year: (Composerʻs Award) Best achievement in creating a first–time recorded instrumental composition
- Female Vocalist of the Year: Best performance by a female artist
- Group of the Year: Best performance by a vocal duo or group
- Male Vocalist of the Year: Best performance by a male artist
- Most Promising Artist of the Year: Most promising first–recorded effort as a featured artist or group
- Favorite Entertainer of the Year: Selected by the general public

=== Genre categories ===
- Alternative Album of the Year: Best performance in an alternative style
- Anthology of the Year: Best album of previously released material
- Christmas Album of the Year: Best performance of music with a Christmas theme
- Comedy Album or DVD of the Year: Best comedy performance on an album or DVD
- Compilation Album of the Year: (Producerʻs Award) Best performance of newly released material by a minimum of three distinct artists
- Contemporary Album of the Year: Best performance of music in a contemporary style
- Hawaiian Album of the Year: Best performance of Hawaiian music (non-Hawaii residents eligible)
- Hip Hop Album of the Year: Best performance of music in a hip-hop style
- Instrumental Album of the Year: Best instrumental performance
- Island Music Album of the Year: Best contemporary performance of music of or about Hawaii (non-Hawaii residents eligible)
- Jazz Album of the Year: Best jazz performance
- Music Video DVD of the Year: Best performance of music and video on a DVD
- R&B Album of the Year: Best performance of music in a R&B style
- Reggae Album of the Year: Best reggae performance
- Religious Album of the Year: Best performance of religious material
- Rock Album of the Year: Best rock performance
- Slack Key Album of the Year: Best performance of slack key or vocals with slack key accompaniment (non-Hawaii residents eligible)
- Ukulele Album of the Year: Best ukulele performance (non-Hawaii residents eligible)

=== Technical categories ===
- Liner Notes: Best achievement in album annotation
- Graphics: Best achievement in album cover design

=== Adjudicated categories ===
- Haku Mele: (Composer's Award) Best first–released song or chant primarily in the Hawaiian language (non-Hawaii residents eligible)
- Hawaiian Language Performance: (Artist Award) Best performance in the Hawaiian language (non-Hawaii residents eligible)
- Engineering Award: Best technical achievement in a sound recording and mix–down
- International Album of the Year: Best performance by non-U.S. performer(s) on an album or DVD whose tracks are at least 75% in the Hawaiian language or performed in slack key or Island Music styles

== Award winners ==
=== Album of the Year ===
The Nā Hōkū Hanohano Awards for Album of the Year is presented by the Hawaii Academy of Recording Arts to honor artistic achievement, technical proficiency and overall excellence in the Hawaii recording industry. The Album of the Year award is the most prestigious award category at the Nā Hōkū Hanohano Awards.

==== 2020s winners ====
| Year | Album | Artist(s) | Label |
|---|---|---|---|
| 2020 | Ua Kui A Lawa | Josh Tatofi | 90211000 |
| 2021 | Waipunalei | Kainani Kahaunaele | Kainani Kahaunaele, Māhuahua Music, LLC. |
| 2022 | Native Lands | Kulaiwi | Kulaiwi Music |
| 2023 | Natalie Noelani | Natalie Ai Kamauu | Keko Record |

=== Lifetime Achievement Award ===
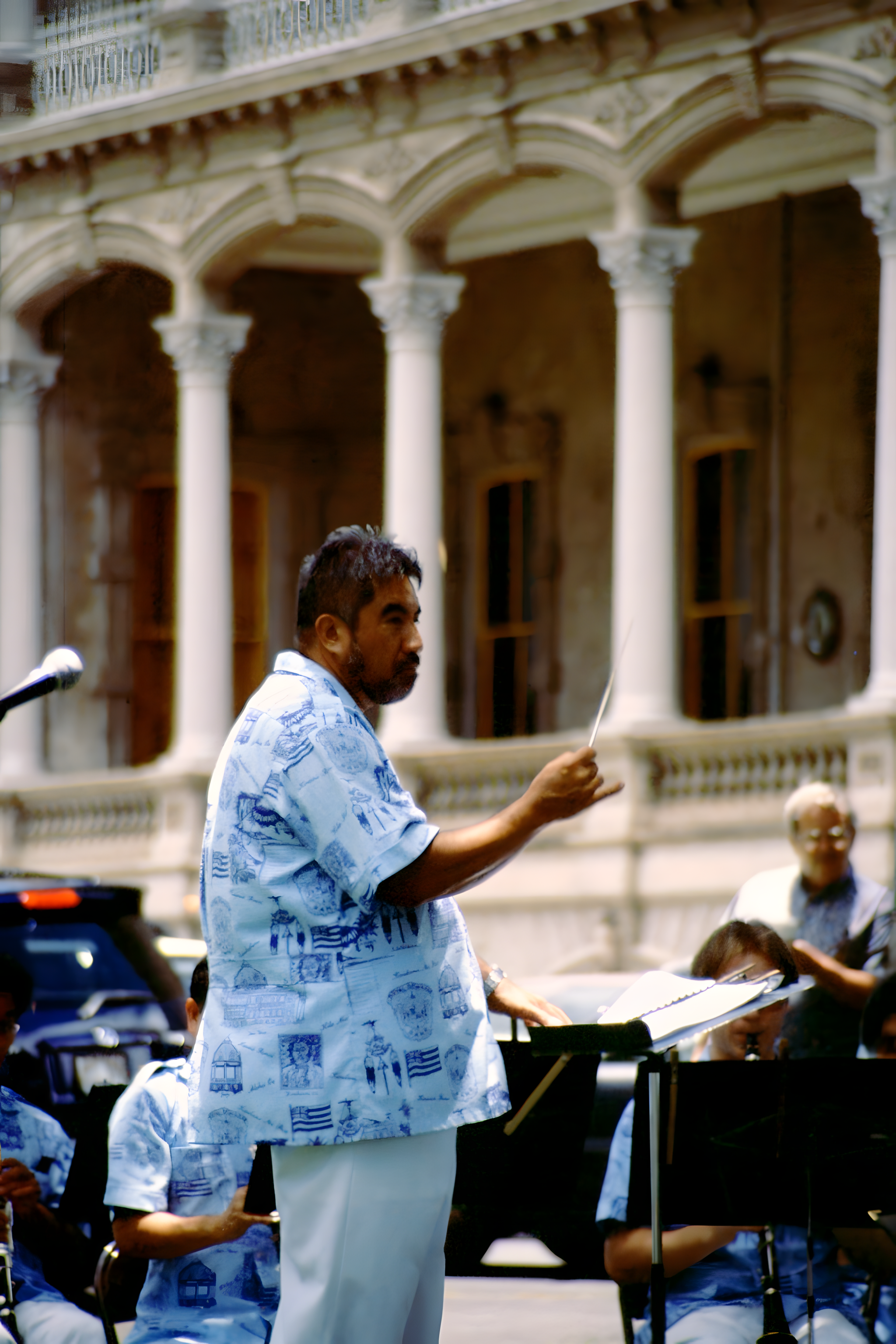
Aaron Mahi

- Jeff Apaka
- Patience "Pat" Namaka Bacon
- Jay Larrin
- Aaron Mahi
- Puakea Nogelmeier
- Kui Lee
- Henry Kapono Kaaihue
- Ledward Kaapana
- Keali'i Reichel
- Na Leo Pilimehana
- Leon and Malia

=== Lifetime Achievement Legacy Recognition Honorees ===
- Senator Daniel K. Akaka
- Emma Kapiʻolani Farden Sharpe

== See also ==
- Hawaiian Music Hall of Fame
- Music of Hawaii
- Hawaii Music Awards
