= Hitchhike Records =

American record label

Hitchhike Records is the U.S. record label of ukulele performer Jake Shimabukuro. It is based in Honolulu, Hawaii, and is the American distribution arm of his recordings for Sony Music Japan International, which he signed with in June 2002.

Sony Japan only releases his music in Japan. Shimabukuro needed to license the music for release in Hawaii, so he created Hitchhike Records for U.S. release. In 2005, Shimabukuro secured a nationwide U.S. distribution deal for his Hitchhike Records label, which had previously distributed to the Hawaii market.

In addition to releasing all of Shimabukuro's U.S. albums, Hitchhike has also released an album by Jake's brother, ukulele performer Bruce Shimabukuro: Bits & Pieces (2007).
