= Haili Church Choir =

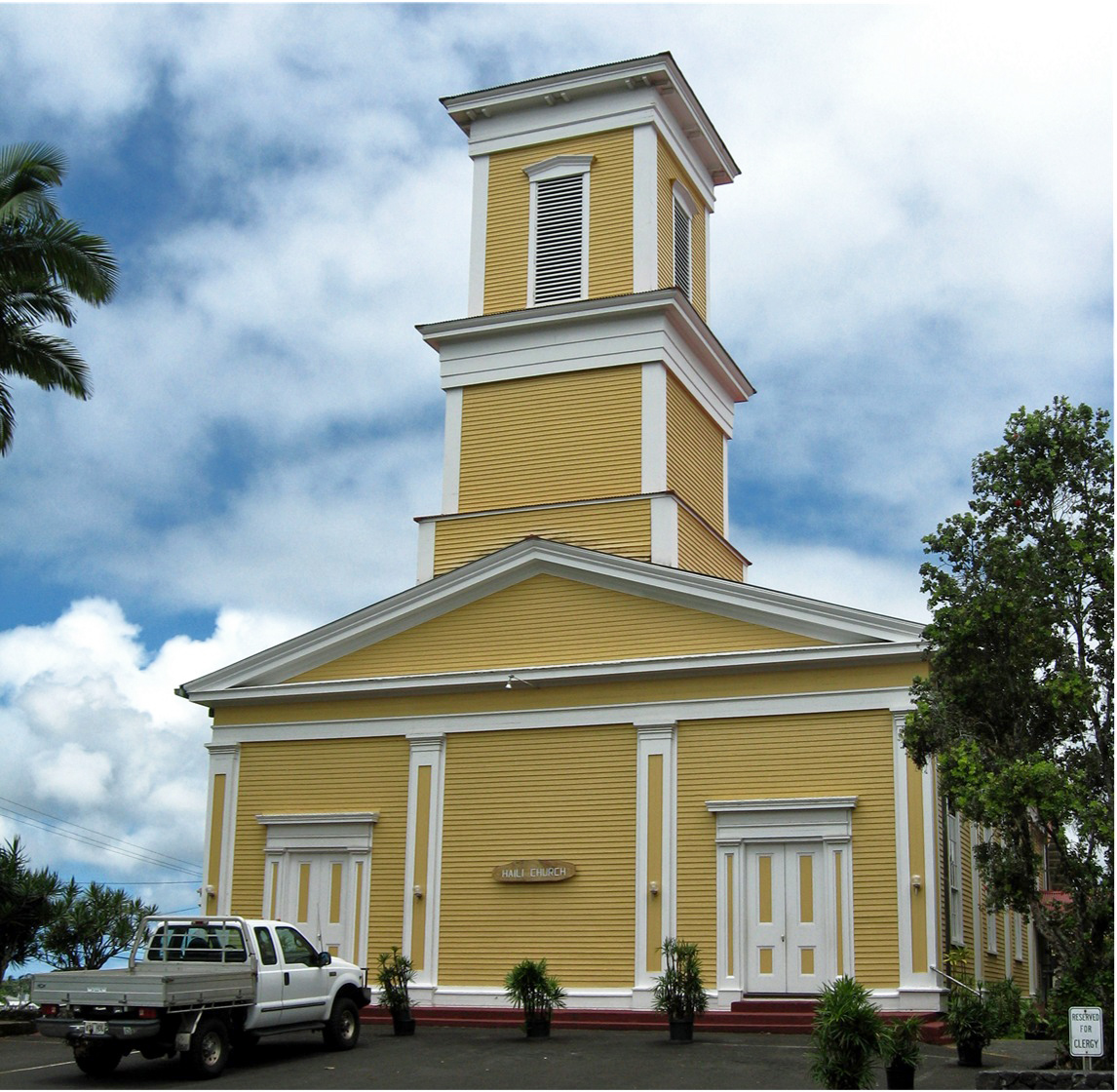
Haili Church, Hilo, Hawaii

Haili Church Choir was established in 1902, and is affiliated with Haili Church in Hilo, on the island of Hawaii, in the U.S. state of Hawaii. In 2001, the choir was inducted into the Hawaiian Music Hall of Fame in recognition of its promoting and developing music endemic to the Hawaiian culture. Several members of the choir have gone on to achieve commercial and cultural success in the genre of Hawaiian music.

== History ==
The choir was begun in 1902 by local Hilo music teacher Harry K. Naope Sr. For the indigenous population, belonging to a church choir was a natural extension of the musical culture and training that was part of the Hawaiian home life. In the Hawaiian language, the term mele denotes both ancient chants and also songs. With limited resources and no hymn books to rely on, Naope improvised by copying the individual meles, which he translated from English into the Hawaiian language, onto a single piece of paper tacked up on the walls. Choir members committed the meles to memory. Haili differed from the old missionary choirs in that Naope incorporated secular meles into the choir's repertoire. The choir became known for its a cappella style, developed of necessity in the early days of sporadic instrumental accompaniment.

== Cultural influence ==
The choir was inducted into the Hawaiian Music Hall of Fame in 2001. Credited with being a nurturing and influential environment for Hawaiian culture and music, the choir has produced many accomplished artists, some of whom are also inductees of the Hawaiian Music Hall of Fame.

Thomas Kihei Desha Brown (1925–1978) was an established band leader and falsetto singer who received his early training in the choir. Composer Albert Po'ai Nahale-a Sr (1910–1970) had been one of the choir's ministers of music. Recording artist Anuhea Audrey Brown (born 1922) was the choir's piano accompanist for two decades, beginning in the 1940s. Falsetto vocalist George Kainapau (1905–1992), who made his first recording in 1929 with Sol Hoʻopiʻi and Andy Iona, also received his early training in the choir.

Coloratura soprano Helen Desha Beamer (1882–1952) had served as the church organist. Beamer herself was the matriarch of a family that produced celebrated performers in Hawaiian music. Hall of fame falsetto singer Mahi Beamer (1929–) is her grandson, while her granddaughter is "Auntie Nona" Winona Beamer . Brothers Keola Beamer and Kapono Beamer are her great-grandsons.
