= Kamanamaikalani Beamer =

Author, geographer and educator on natural resources and Hawaiian Studies

Kamana Beamer
- Pronunciation: Kah-mah-nah-m-eye-kah-lah-nee
- Born: Brenton Kamanamaikalani Beamer
- Education: B.A. UH Mānoa, 2002 M.A. UH Mānoa, 2005 Ph.D. UH Mānoa, 2008
- Occupations: Professor, author, geographer
- Website: kamanabeamer.com

Kamana Beamer (born Brenton Kamanamaikalani Beamer in the late 1970s) is an author, geographer, and educator on natural resources and Hawaiian Studies. He currently holds the Dana Naone Hall Chair in the Center for Hawaiian Studies with a joint appointment in the Richardson School of Law and the Hawai‘inuiākea School of Hawaiian Knowledge at the University of Hawai'i at Mānoa (UH Mānoa). He is one of eight panelists appointed by Hawai'i Governor David Ige to hold stewardship over Mauna Kea.

== Personal life ==
Beamer was born in Hawaiʻi and raised on the islands of Hawai'i, Kauaʻi, and Oʻahu and comes from a family of Hawaiian musicians. In 1972, his father, singer-songwriter Kapono Beamer (who founded "The Beamer Brothers" with his brother, Keola Beamer), worked with Keola to release an album titled "This Is Our Island Home - We Are Her Sons," followed by several other albums that influenced "Hawaiian contemporary music." Additionally, his grandmother Winona Beamer ("Aunty Nona") was a proponent of authentic Hawaiian performing arts and culture. She was also the cousin of Hawaiian Music Hall of Fame inductee Mahi Beamer and the granddaughter of musician and composer Helen Deisha Beamer.

Continuing his family's legacy, Beamer joined the Kamehameha Schools Hawaiian Ensemble, a group that Winona established when she taught at Kamehameha Schools. Beamer eventually came to be the vocalist and guitarist for his band, Kāmau (with Kaliko Ma'i'i and Adam Zaslow), debuting their album "Live from the Lo'i" in 2007 when he was just 29. Kāmau was recognized as "maoli music" and focused on political issues surrounding Hawai'i sovereignty and demilitarization.

== Education ==
Beamer graduated from Kamehameha Schools in 1996 and went on to Marymount College, where he received an Associate of Arts degree in 1998. He was offered a football scholarship, briefly attending Bethel College in Newton, Kansas, before attending to Occidental College in Los Angeles, California to be "closer to the ocean". Beamer wanted to take Hawaiian language to satisfy the two years of a foreign language required to graduate; however, Occidental College did not recognize Hawaiian as a language, and so he returned to Hawai'i and finished his undergrad education at UH Mānoa where he received his Bachelor of Arts in philosophy and Hawaiian studies in 2002. He went on to receive a Master of Arts and Ph.D. in cultural geography at UH Mānoa. As a graduate student, Beamer worked as a research assistant for Dr. Kaeo Duarte from 2002 to 2004 and became a graduate teaching assistant and Hawaiian language teacher in 2004.

=== Thesis and dissertation ===
In 2005, Beamer submitted his thesis for a Master of Arts in geography in which he focused on the impacts of colonialism on Hawai'i. Beamer investigated the connection between foreign mapping of the Hawaiian Islands and the dispossession that accompanied it, shifting the previous guidance of land-tenure to a modern capitalist model. He sought to identify the role of traditional palena (boundaries) and understand how colonial mapping changed the Hawaiian landscape. In his 2008 Ph.D. dissertation, "Na wai kamana?", Beamer expanded on this idea, citing adaptability as being a crucial aspect of Hawaiian character. Beamer demonstrated that, despite Euro-American imperialism and the colonization that ensued, Native Hawaiians persevered not by resisting change, but by using it for their own means.

== Community involvement ==
=== Water resources ===
From 2001 to 2015, Beamer worked towards restoring the lo'i (wetland taro patch) in Waipi'o Valley. His time spent in the lo'i expanded his understanding of the state of water resources in Hawai'i. In 2013, he was nominated and confirmed to serve on Hawai'i's Commission of Water and Resource Management based on his extensive experience in the field stemming from speaking at numerous conferences, publishing multiple works on Hawaiian resource management, and land tenure. He was again nominated and reconfirmed to serve on the board in 2017, continuing to help manage Hawaii's public lands, water sources, and minerals.

=== Mauna Kea ===
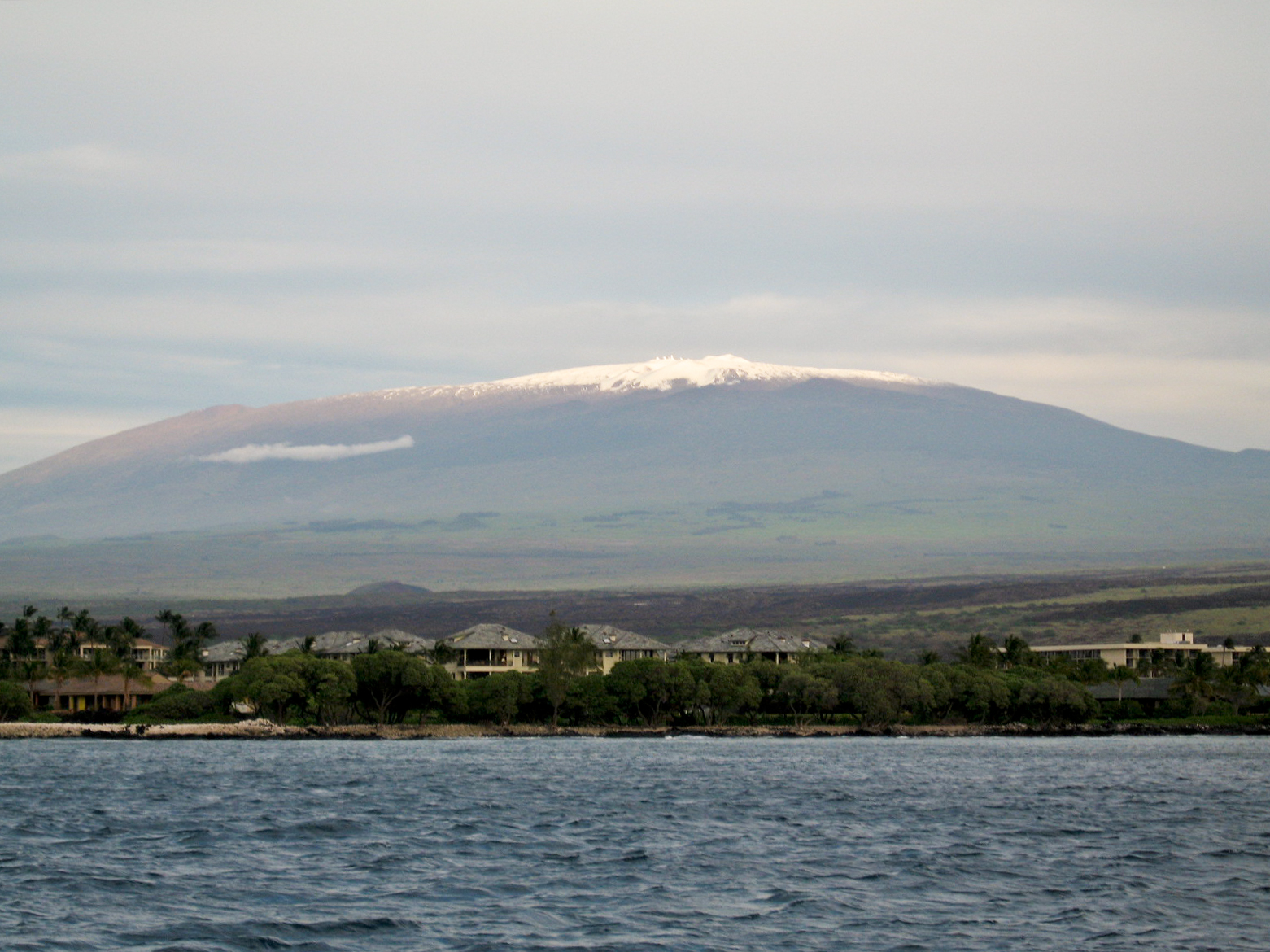
Mauna Kea, a dormant shield volcano on Hawai'i island that is known for its cultural, ecological, and scientific significance. It is considered a sacred site by the Native Hawaiian people, who have been protesting the construction of telescopes and other facilities on the mountain. It is also home to a diverse array of plant and animal life, including many species that are endemic to Hawaii.

Kamana Beamer has been a prominent figure in the movement to protect Mauna Kea, a sacred dormant volcano in Hawai'i, from what many native Hawaiians see as environmental and cultural desecration. Beamer has used his position as a cultural practitioner and scholar to raise awareness about the importance of Mauna Kea to the people of Hawai'i and the government. He has been a critic of the construction of a large thirty meter telescope on Mauna Kea's summit.

Beamer has also used his academic background to research the cultural and environmental significance of Mauna Kea, publishing numerous papers and articles on the subject. He has argued that the mountain is not only a site of cultural and spiritual importance, but also an important ecological resource, with unique plant and animal species that are endangered by the construction of the telescope.

== Career ==
In 2009, Beamer became an assistant professor at the University of Hawaiʻi at Mānoa's Center for Hawaiian Studies and Richardson School of Law. Since 2012, he has been a Professor at University of Hawaiʻi's Hawai'inuiākea School of Hawaiian Knowledge and Richardson School of Law, in the Hui‘Āina Momona Program.

In 2013, Beamer was confirmed serve four years on Hawai'i's Commission of Water and Resource Management by then-governor Neil Abercrombie. He was reconfirmed in 2017. In 2015, he became the new president and CEO of the Kohala Center, a Hawai'ian non-profit and research institution.

In 2021, Beamer became the Dana Naone Hall Endowed Chair in Hawaiian Studies, Literature and the Environment at the University of Hawai'i at Mānoa Hawaiʻinuiākea School of Hawaiian Knowledge. In 2022, he was one of six individuals appointed to a panel by then-governor David Ige to manage the future of Mauna Kea. He is also the Director of Kamakakūokalani Center for Hawaiian Studies at the University of Hawaiʻi at Mānoa.

== Published works ==
- No Mākou Ka Mana—Liberating the Nation, Kamehameha Publishing, (2014).
- Islands and Cultures: How Pacific Islands Provide Paths toward Sustainability, Yale University Press (2022).
- Beamer, Kamanamaikalani; Tuma, Axel; Thorenz, Andrea; Boldoczki, Sandra; Kotubetey, Keliʻiahonui; Kukea-Shultz, Kanekoa; Elkington, Kawena (2021). "Reflections on Sustainability Concepts: Aloha ʻĀina and the Circular Economy". Sustainability
- Beamer, Kamanamaikalani; Elkington, Kawena; Souza, Pua; Tuma, Axel; Thorenz, Andrea; Köhler, Sandra; Kukea-Shultz, Kānekoa; Kotubetey, Keliʻi; Winter, Kawika B. (2023-01-01). "Island and Indigenous systems of circularity: how Hawaiʻi can inform the development of universal circular economy policy goals". Ecology and Society. 28 (1). doi:10.5751/ES-13656-280109

== Awards and recognitions ==
- 2014: Named one of "20 leaders for the next 20 years" by Hawai'i Business Magazine.
- 2015: Samuel M. Kamakau Book of the Year Award.
