= Beamer (surname) =

Beamer is a surname. Notable people with this surname include the following:

- Adrian L. Beamer (1923–2008), American football player
- Diane Beamer (born 1960), Australian politician
- Frank Beamer (born 1946), American football coach
- George N. Beamer (1904–1974), United States federal judge
- Helen Desha Beamer (1882–1952), Hawaiian musician
- Jacob R. Beamer (born 1810), Canadian military personnel
- John V. Beamer (1896–1964), Representative from Indiana in the US Congress
- Keola Beamer (born 1951), Hawaiian guitar player, son of Winona
- Lisa Beamer (born 1969), American writer
- Mahi Beamer (1928–2017), Hawaiian musician
- Nub Beamer (1936–2024), American football player
- Shane Beamer (born 1977), son of Frank, also an American football coach
- Tim Beamer (born 1948), African-American football player
- Todd Beamer (1968–2001), victim of the September 11th attacks
- Winona Beamer (1923–2008), Hawaiian preservationist, mother of Keola

== See also ==
- Beemer (surname)
