= Beamer =

Beamer may refer to:

- Beamer (cricket), a type of ball delivery
- Beamer (LaTeX), a document class for creating presentation slides
- Beamer (occupation), in the cotton industry
- Beamer (surname), including a list of people with the name
- Beamer, Indiana, a place in the United States
- Beamer, one who compromises accounts on Roblox
- Beamer, a slang expression for a BMW vehicle
- French Marine Accident Investigation Office (Bureau d'Enquêtes sur les Événements de Mer), known as BEAmer

== See also ==
- Beemer (disambiguation)
- Bimmer (disambiguation)
- Beamer Resolution, the US enabling legislation for the Driver License Compact
- Beamer Trail, a hiking trail in Grand Canyon National Park, US
- Video projector, an image projector
