= Isabella Haleʻala Kaʻili Desha =

Hawaiian composer and musician

Isabella Haleʻala Kaʻili Desha (née Miller; January 16, 1864 – February 28, 1949) was a highly regarded Hawaiian composer, musician and kumu hula during the Kingdom of Hawaii and throughout her life. She is descended from notable chiefly lines.

== Birth and early life ==
She was one of five children. Her father was Alika (Alexander) Mela (Miller). She, along with her mother, Kapuailohiawahine Kanuha Miller, herself a notable kumu hula, composer and dancer of her time, would teach the dance in a secret Hawaiian hālau. Isabella's sibling's included John Mahiʻai Miller/Kāneakua.

Isabella married George Langhern Desha, the Postmaster for Hilo, Hawaii, and had four children, including William Francis Desha and Helen Desha Beamer. In his book, Learn to Play Hawaiian Slack Key Guitar, Keola Beamer writes that Helen Beamer and her mother Isabella would dance the hula, Kūwili as a spontaneous celebration during family gatherings.

She is the matriarch of the Beamer musical dynasty, considered the most notable musical family in the history of the Hawaiian islands. The family includes award winning musicians, composers, historians and activists that have perpetuated Hawaiian culture and history for over 100 years. She was forced to teach the hula in secret due to the puritanical beliefs of the Calvinist missionaries.

== Beamer method of hula ==
During the reign of King David Kalakaua, the formerly banned native dance known as hula was given a mandate from the monarch to be brought back to both the Royal Court and in public display. Many of the hula master of the time came forward from different parts of the islands representing different parts of the old aliʻi kingdoms. Through this restoration of the dance, was preserved the identification of the original four aliʻi kingdoms through chant.

== Family tree ==
Beamer, Desha, Kāneakua, Miller family tree

**Key- Subjects with bold titles and blue bold box= Aliʻi line. Bold title and grey bolded box= Lower ranking Aliʻi line. Bold title and un-bolded box= European nobility. Regular name and box= makaʻāinana or untitled foreign subject**.

**Mela (Miller)**	**Kānekapōlei** (Note: Hawaiian researcher Dorothy Barrère lists Kanekapolei as the wife of Mela (Miller) on page 458 of her book from the full Mahele land claim of Kanekapolei's son Alika Mela- LCA 8018.)	**Kaialii**	**Poimoa**	**Kilinahe**	**Lama (w)**
**Alexander P. Miller Jr.** **(Alika Mela)** (Note: Kaʻanoʻi Walk writes in an article for the Hawaiian Cultural Center: "..my great-grandfather John Mahiʻai Kāneakua was born in Honuaʻula, Maui to his loving parents Alexander P. Miller and Kanuha (Kaialiilii) Miller".)	**Kapuailohia Wahine Kanuha Kaialiilii**. (Note: Kapuailohiawahine and her daughter Isabella, taught Hula in secret, hiding it after the ban by Kaʻahumanu.)	Ai	**Namakalele**
Charles Makee (Note: The son of Charles Makee (the son of James Makee, a wealthy sea Captain) Charles Miller was the son of "Sarah Miller, written as "S. Mila" on the marriage record".)	**Sarah Kaʻili Miller**	**John Mahiʻai Miller/Kaneakua** (Oct. 9, 1860-Jan. 26, 1936); **County Clerk of Kaua‘i**; Hui Hawaiian Aloha ʻĀina	Lucy Kaʻumealani Cummings	**Samuel Kalimahana Kaialiilii Miller**. (Note: Hawaii State Archives lists Samuel Kaia Miller marrying Amoy Ai on 5-2-1903 in Honolulu, Hawaii.) (Note: The Marriage certificate of Samuel and Daisy Amoe Ai lists Alika Miller and Kanuha as parents to Samuel, with Namakelele and Ai as parent to Daisy. (Note: State of Hawaii Department of Health, Office of Health Status Monitoring, Certificate of Marriage, May 2, 1903)) (1868-Nov. 24, 1933)	**Daisy Amoe Ai** (Note: Daisy Amoe and Samuel Kalimahana Miller had 12 children and resided in Kalihi where Samuel worked as a painter.)	George Langhern Desha	**Isabella Haleʻala Kaʻili Miller** (Note: In a press release from the Hula Preservation Society, they list Isabella Hale`ala Miller Desha as Nona Beamer's great grandmother.) (Note: The Desha Genealogy lists William Francis Desha as the son of Isabella and George Desha.) (1865-Feb. 28, 1949)	**Noa Miller**
**Charles Miller**	Sakichi Hayashi	**Annie Maikaʻi Miller**	Charles Hoolulu Siemsen	Peter Carl Beamer	**Helen Kapuailohia Desha** (Sept. 8, 1882–Sept. 25, 1952)	**David Lester Desha**
**James Waichiro Miller**	**Milton Hoʻolulu Beamer** (October 18, 1903 (Note: Hawaii Births and Christenings, 1852-1933. Milton Hoolulu Desha Beamer, 18 Oct 1903; citing Hilo, Hawaii, Hawaii, reference p 36; FHL microfilm 1,031,747.) - )	Kaaloehukaiopuaena Copp	**Francis Kealiʻinohopono Beamer**	Louise Leiomälama	**Harriet Kekahiliokalani Beamer**	**Peter Carl Kaleikaʻapunihonua Beamer Jr.**	**Helen Elizabeth Kawohikukapulani Beamer**
**Mahi Beamer**	Odell Steppe	**Winona Beamer**
**Keola Beamer**	Kapono Beamer
