= Beemer =

Beemer may refer to:

== Places ==
- Beemer, Nebraska, a village
- Beemer Township, Cuming County, Nebraska, a township

== Other uses ==
- Beemer (surname)

== Slang ==
- BMW motor vehicles
- IBM employee

== See also ==
- Beamer (disambiguation)
- Bimmer (disambiguation)
