= John Mahiʻai Kāneakua =

Hawaiian noble (1860–1936)

The Honourable John Mahiʻai Kāneakua
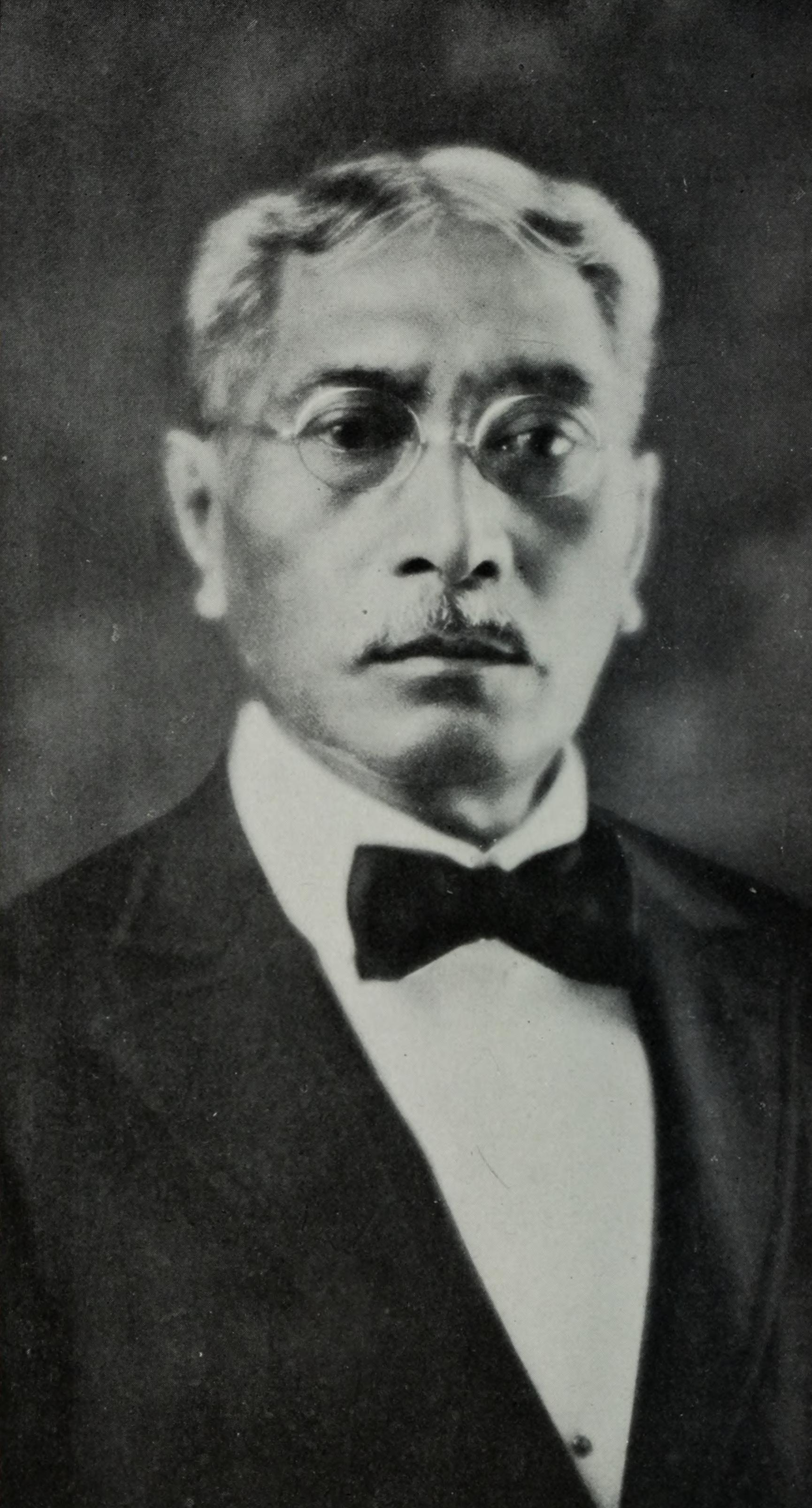

County Clerk of Kauaʻi
- In office 1906 – 1934 (at retirement)

Personal details
- Born: John Mahiʻai Miller; September 9, 1860 Honauaula, Maui, Hawaii
- Died: January 26, 1936 (aged 75) Kapaʻa, Kauaʻi, Hawaii
- Resting place: Kapaa First Hawaiian Church Cemetery
- Party: Republican
- Children: 2 adopted, 10 natural
- Education: Royal School (Hawaii)
- Occupation: Clerk for Hawaiian Legislature, Attorney, Notary Public, Politician
- Profession: Law

The Honourable John Mahiʻai Kāneakua (born John Mahiʻai Miller, September 9, 1860 – January 26, 1936) was a noble of the non-ruling elite of the Kingdom of Hawaii, an attorney and politician. He was re-elected to the position of County Clerk of Kauaʻi for 28 years until his retirement at the age of 74.

He opposed the provisional government/republic after overthrow by European Americans. He was elected during the territorial period. He supported Queen Liliʻuokalani after the overthrow in 1893 by actively participating in attempts to restore the monarchy.

He had attended the Royal School, graduating in 1877. He began practicing law in the Kingdom of Hawaii in 1886 and was a member of the Queen's OWN, (part of the volunteer military forces of the Kingdom) from 1886 to 1887.

== Early life and education ==
He was born John Mahiai Miller in Honuaula, Maui to father, Alexander (Alika) P. Miller, son of Mela (Miller) and mother, Kapuailohiawahine Kanuha (Kaialiilii) Miller on October 9, 1860. Kapuailohiawahine Miller, a notable hakumele (Hawaiian for composer of music) and his sister Isabella Hale'ala Miller taught hula in secret when the dance was banned. He also had a brother, Samuel Kalimahana Miller, born in 1868. and other siblings. He would be hānai adopted by James Kāneakua who, it is believed, had no children of his own.

John attended the Royal school, graduating in 1877 and then began studying law with Edward Preston, working as a clerk for the judge while Preston was still in the legislature of the Hawaiian Kingdom in the House of Nobles. He was admitted to practice law within the Kingdom in 1884, a year before Preston would be named to the Supreme Court of Hawaii. Newspaper ads from the attorney were prevalent in Hawaii where he was considered well known.

== Military service and organizations ==
The Kingdom of Hawaii's military was divided into several branches with one permanent King's Guard and several volunteer companies including the King's Own, The Queen's Own and the Prince's Own. John volunteered starting out as a Second Lieutenant of the Queen's Own on October 3, 1885 soon making First Lieutenant of Company A, and serving until 1887.

He helped found the Kamehameha Rifle Association with Robert W. Wilcox, Sam Nowlein, and S. K. Kane and was a member of numerous organizations and associations including the Royal Order of Kamehameha, Kauaʻi Chamber of Commerce, Republican Central Committee, Ka Hale of Nā Aliʻi o Hawaiʻi, and the Kauaʻi Historical Society. He was also a member of Hui Hawaiian Aloha ʻĀina, which opposed the annexation of Hawaii.

== After overthrow of the Hawaiian Kingdom ==
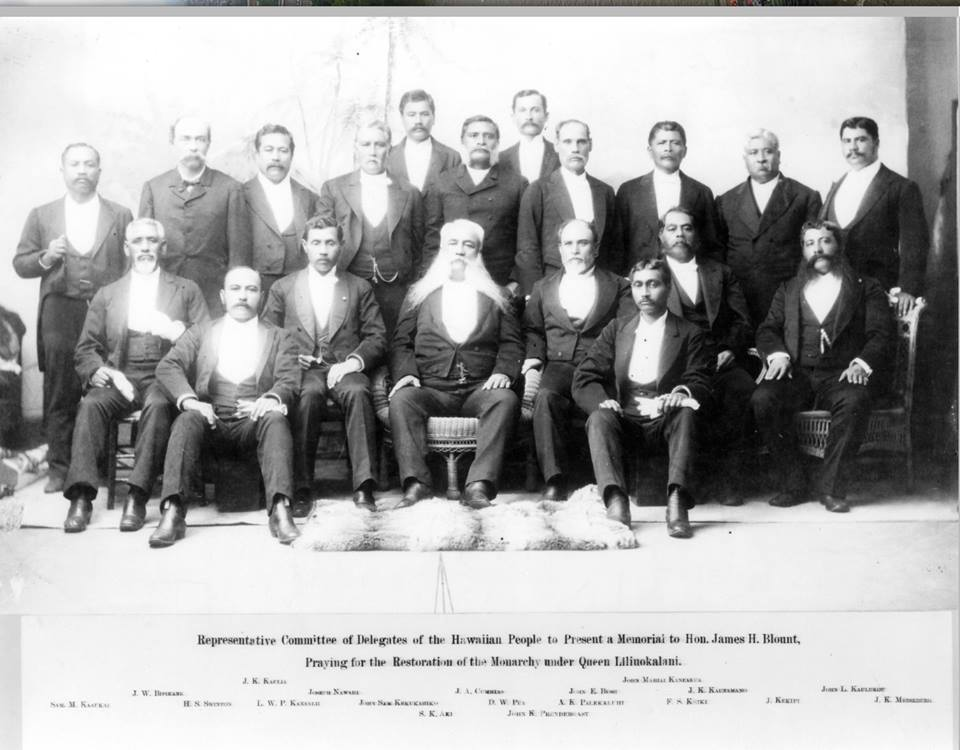
Committee members, selected to present a memorial to U.S. Special Commissioner, James Blount. Kāneakua is seated on the bottom right

On January 17, 1893, the Kingdom of Hawaii was overthrown in a coup d'état by a militia group known as the Citizen's Committee of Public Safety. As part of the response to the overthrow, the Hui Hawaiian Aloha ʻĀina (Hawaiian Patriotic League) formed a convention of delegates with petitions against annexation and created a committee of members, selected to present a memorial to U.S. Special Commissioner, James Blount during the investigation for what became Blount Report for then President, Grover Cleveland. Kāneakua's name appears last on the list of the 19 committee member signatures. Part of the document read:

Since the fate of our little kingdom and its inhabitants is in your hands, we do humbly pray that a speedy solution may be reached to avoid impending calamities, and so that we may once more enjoy the blessings of peace, prosperity, and a proper government.

— Statement of the Hui Hawaiian Aloha ʻĀina

== Personal life, marriages and death ==
John married Esther Kamakolu in Kapaʻa, Kauaʻi on July 5, 1903. They adopted two children named Esther Nuihaku and James Neenee. After Esther's death, Kāneakua remarried again at age 64 to Lucy Kaʻumealani Cummings. This union produced 10 children.

Helped translate the Book of Mormon from English to ʻōlelo Hawaiʻi for the Reorganized Church of Jesus Christ of Latter Day Saints in 1898 even though not of that faith.

Kāneakua's home was in Kapaʻa, Kauaʻi. Puaikaena and her husband granted John interest in land in Honomāʻele, Hāna, Maui by deed on May 30, 1900. On January 11, 1901, he was granted additional land in Waiakoa, Kula, Maui by Mrs. Inoaole Ahulii. John died in his home on the island of Kauaʻi on January 26, 1936.

== Family tree ==
Beamer, Desha, Kāneakua, Miller family tree

**Key- Subjects with bold titles and blue bold box= Aliʻi line. Bold title and grey bolded box= Lower ranking Aliʻi line. Bold title and un-bolded box= European nobility. Regular name and box= makaʻāinana or untitled foreign subject**.

**Mela (Miller)**	**Kānekapōlei** (Note: Hawaiian researcher Dorothy Barrère lists Kanekapolei as the wife of Mela (Miller) on page 458 of her book from the full Mahele land claim of Kanekapolei's son Alika Mela- LCA 8018.)	**Kaialii**	**Poimoa**	**Kilinahe**	**Lama (w)**
**Alexander P. Miller Jr.** **(Alika Mela)** (Note: Kaʻanoʻi Walk writes in an article for the Hawaiian Cultural Center: "..my great-grandfather John Mahiʻai Kāneakua was born in Honuaʻula, Maui to his loving parents Alexander P. Miller and Kanuha (Kaialiilii) Miller".)	**Kapuailohia Wahine Kanuha Kaialiilii**. (Note: Kapuailohiawahine and her daughter Isabella, taught Hula in secret, hiding it after the ban by Kaʻahumanu.)	Ai	**Namakalele**
Charles Makee (Note: The son of Charles Makee (the son of James Makee, a wealthy sea Captain) Charles Miller was the son of "Sarah Miller, written as "S. Mila" on the marriage record".)	**Sarah Kaʻili Miller**	**John Mahiʻai Miller/Kaneakua** (Oct. 9, 1860-Jan. 26, 1936); **County Clerk of Kaua‘i**; Hui Hawaiian Aloha ʻĀina	Lucy Kaʻumealani Cummings	**Samuel Kalimahana Kaialiilii Miller**. (Note: Hawaii State Archives lists Samuel Kaia Miller marrying Amoy Ai on 5-2-1903 in Honolulu, Hawaii.) (Note: The Marriage certificate of Samuel and Daisy Amoe Ai lists Alika Miller and Kanuha as parents to Samuel, with Namakelele and Ai as parent to Daisy. (Note: State of Hawaii Department of Health, Office of Health Status Monitoring, Certificate of Marriage, May 2, 1903)) (1868-Nov. 24, 1933)	**Daisy Amoe Ai** (Note: Daisy Amoe and Samuel Kalimahana Miller had 12 children and resided in Kalihi where Samuel worked as a painter.)	George Langhern Desha	**Isabella Haleʻala Kaʻili Miller** (Note: In a press release from the Hula Preservation Society, they list Isabella Hale`ala Miller Desha as Nona Beamer's great grandmother.) (Note: The Desha Genealogy lists William Francis Desha as the son of Isabella and George Desha.) (1865-Feb. 28, 1949)	**Noa Miller**
**Charles Miller**	Sakichi Hayashi	**Annie Maikaʻi Miller**	Charles Hoolulu Siemsen	Peter Carl Beamer	**Helen Kapuailohia Desha** (Sept. 8, 1882–Sept. 25, 1952)	**David Lester Desha**
**James Waichiro Miller**	**Milton Hoʻolulu Beamer** (October 18, 1903 (Note: Hawaii Births and Christenings, 1852-1933. Milton Hoolulu Desha Beamer, 18 Oct 1903; citing Hilo, Hawaii, Hawaii, reference p 36; FHL microfilm 1,031,747.) - )	Kaaloehukaiopuaena Copp	**Francis Kealiʻinohopono Beamer**	Louise Leiomälama	**Harriet Kekahiliokalani Beamer**	**Peter Carl Kaleikaʻapunihonua Beamer Jr.**	**Helen Elizabeth Kawohikukapulani Beamer**
**Mahi Beamer**	Odell Steppe	**Winona Beamer**
**Keola Beamer**	Kapono Beamer
