= Mela (Miller) =

Mela (Miller) was the name Native Hawaiians called Alexander (Alika) Miller Sr., the foreign mason of Kamehameha I and chief builder of the Brick Palace who was on Oahu before the Battle of Nuʻuanu in 1795.

== Brick Palace ==
Artist's conception of the Brick Palace from the Lahaina Restoration Foundation

Before the Battle of Nuuanu a number of foreigners were living on Oahu under the rule of Kalanikūpule. Among these settlers were Oliver Holmes, Shomisona, Mr. Lele, Mr. Mela [Miller] and Mr. Keakaʻeleʻele [Black Jack]. After Kamehameha I conquered Oahu they all pledged oaths to the new alii. A letter from William Richards to Reverend Levi Chamberlain dated September 18, 1830, describes "Miller" as a Mason living in Lahaina. Richard also notes that "Miller" likes rum.

Mela, along with Mr. Keka'ele'ele (Black Jack), possibly the first African American in Hawaii, built the Brick Palace for Kamehameha I's favorite wife, Kaʻahumanu. The palace was the first western-style structure built in the Hawaiian Islands, serving as the first Royal Palace. Located at Lahaina, Maui, the site became the seat of government and capital of the Kingdom of Hawaii until 1845. William Richards would later receive the land the Brick Palace was built on.

== John Papa ʻĪʻī ==
Mela was the kahu (royal attendant) of John Papa ʻĪʻī, who writes of the occasion when, as a young boy who didn't wish to walk on a long journey, his attendants, either Mela or Kiwalao, scared him into walking by pointing to foreigners and telling the young boy; "Here come the haoles, who do not like children who cry too much".

== Family, descendants and legacy ==
Mela's English name was Alexander (Alika) Miller Sr. Alexander wed or cohabitated with Kānekapōlei and had two children, a girl named Kahinu (w) and a son named Alika (Alexander) Mela (Miller) Jr. While Mela was originally gifted with several lots of land from Kamehameha I, his son Alika had to relinquish all but one, Opaeula ahupuaa in Lahaina, Maui.

Alika married Kanuha Kaialiilii, sister of Captain J.H. Mahiai, in 1855. Kanuha and Mahiai were two of 9 children of Kaialiilii and Poimoa. Alika and Kanuha had eight children;

- Kale [Sarah] (w)
- John Mahiʻai (born Miller) Kāneakua
- Hale
- Kahalea
- Kanekapolei (w)
- Isabel/Isabella Haleʻala Kaʻili Desha (née Miller) (w)
- Noa
- Kalimahana

Sarah Miller is said to have married or cohabitated with a Mr. Harvey Raymond but there was no issue from the union. Sarah did have 4 children with Charles Makee, including a son named Charles Miller. John Mahiʻai was hanai adopted by James Kāneakua. He married twice. His first marriage produced no issue however, his second marriage to Lucy Kaʻumealani Cummings produced ten children.

== Family tree ==
Beamer, Desha, Kāneakua, Miller family tree

**Key- Subjects with bold titles and blue bold box= Aliʻi line. Bold title and grey bolded box= Lower ranking Aliʻi line. Bold title and un-bolded box= European nobility. Regular name and box= makaʻāinana or untitled foreign subject**.

**Mela (Miller)**	**Kānekapōlei** (Note: Hawaiian researcher Dorothy Barrère lists Kanekapolei as the wife of Mela (Miller) on page 458 of her book from the full Mahele land claim of Kanekapolei's son Alika Mela- LCA 8018.'"`UNIQ--ref-00000015-QINU`"')	**Kaialii**	**Poimoa**	**Kilinahe**	**Lama (w)**
**Alexander P. Miller Jr.** **(Alika Mela)** (Note: Kaʻanoʻi Walk writes in an article for the Hawaiian Cultural Center: "..my great-grandfather John Mahiʻai Kāneakua was born in Honuaʻula, Maui to his loving parents Alexander P. Miller and Kanuha (Kaialiilii) Miller".'"`UNIQ--ref-00000017-QINU`"')	**Kapuailohia Wahine Kanuha Kaialiilii**. (Note: Kapuailohiawahine and her daughter Isabella, taught Hula in secret, hiding it after the ban by Kaʻahumanu.'"`UNIQ--ref-00000019-QINU`"')	Ai	**Namakalele**
Charles Makee (Note: The son of Charles Makee (the son of James Makee, a wealthy sea Captain) Charles Miller was the son of "Sarah Miller, written as "S. Mila" on the marriage record".'"`UNIQ--ref-0000001B-QINU`"')	**Sarah Kaʻili Miller**	**John Mahiʻai Miller/Kaneakua** (Oct. 9, 1860-Jan. 26, 1936); **County Clerk of Kaua‘i**; Hui Hawaiian Aloha ʻĀina	Lucy Kaʻumealani Cummings	**Samuel Kalimahana Kaialiilii Miller**. (Note: Hawaii State Archives lists Samuel Kaia Miller marrying Amoy Ai on 5-2-1903 in Honolulu, Hawaii.'"`UNIQ--ref-0000001D-QINU`"') (Note: The Marriage certificate of Samuel and Daisy Amoe Ai lists Alika Miller and Kanuha as parents to Samuel, with Namakelele and Ai as parent to Daisy.'"`UNIQ--ref-0000001F-QINU`"') (1868-Nov. 24, 1933)	**Daisy Amoe Ai** (Note: Daisy Amoe and Samuel Kalimahana Miller had 12 children and resided in Kalihi where Samuel worked as a painter.'"`UNIQ--ref-00000021-QINU`"')	George Langhern Desha	**Isabella Haleʻala Kaʻili Miller** (Note: In a press release from the Hula Preservation Society, they list Isabella Hale`ala Miller Desha as Nona Beamer's great grandmother.'"`UNIQ--ref-00000023-QINU`"') (Note: The Desha Genealogy lists William Francis Desha as the son of Isabella and George Desha.'"`UNIQ--ref-00000025-QINU`"') (1865-Feb. 28, 1949)	**Noa Miller**
**Charles Miller**	Sakichi Hayashi	**Annie Maikaʻi Miller**	Charles Hoolulu Siemsen	Peter Carl Beamer	**Helen Kapuailohia Desha** (Sept. 8, 1882–Sept. 25, 1952)	**David Lester Desha**
**James Waichiro Miller**	**Milton Hoʻolulu Beamer** (October 18, 1903 (Note: Hawaii Births and Christenings, 1852-1933. Milton Hoolulu Desha Beamer, 18 Oct 1903; citing Hilo, Hawaii, Hawaii, reference p 36; FHL microfilm 1,031,747.'"`UNIQ--ref-00000027-QINU`"') - )	Kaaloehukaiopuaena Copp	**Francis Kealiʻinohopono Beamer**	Louise Leiomälama	**Harriet Kekahiliokalani Beamer**	**Peter Carl Kaleikaʻapunihonua Beamer Jr.**	**Helen Elizabeth Kawohikukapulani Beamer**
**Mahi Beamer**	Odell Steppe	**Winona Beamer**
**Keola Beamer**	Kapono Beamer
