= Colin Booth (mycologist) =

English mycologist

Colin Booth (9 December 1924, Scissett, West Yorkshire, UK – 9 April 2003, Somerset, Southwest England) was an English mycologist, known a leading authority on the genus Fusarium.

== Biography ==
As the son of a beamer in a textile mill, Colin Booth grew up in the village of Scissett and was educated at the village school. He left school at age 14, first working as a stone mason and then as a butcher. During WW II in 1941 he volunteered for the Royal Navy and served until 1943 when a spinal injury caused him to be invalided out. After two years of study, he graduated from Huddersfield Technical College. At the University of London, he graduated with a BSc in botany, an MSc in mycology and plant pathology in 1953, and a PhD in 1959 with a PhD thesis on Fusarium.

From 1969 to 1983, Booth was assistant director of Kew's International Mycological Institute (IMI). There he produced comprehensive maps of the global distribution of plant diseases. His research on classification of microfungi provided a conceptual framework for research by plant pathologists. The work of William Laurence Gordon (1901–1963) had a major influence on Booth.

Booth's research is important not only for crop production but also in medicine. Cyclosporin A (CS-A), a hendeca peptide isolated from the fungi Cylindrocarpon lucidum Booth and Trichoderma polysporum, is a potent immunosuppressive drug that proved valuable for preventing rejection of kidney transplants.

Booth's highly-cited book The genus Fusarium (1971) is acknowledged as a comprehensive, valuable reference and the standard text on this important genus, in which many of the species are plant pathogens. In this 1971 book, he accepted only 50 specific taxonomic names out of more than 1000 proposed names in the genus Fusarium. He lectured in North America, the Middle East and India. He was the president of the British Mycological Society for a one-year term from 1977 to 1978.

Booth married his wife Dorothy in 1950. In retirement they lived in Batcombe, Somerset. Upon his death in 2003, he was survived by his widow and their son and daughter.

== Selected publications ==
=== Articles ===
- UK, Cab International; Booth, C.; Waterston, J. M. (1964). "Fusarium culmorum . [Descriptions of Fungi and Bacteria]". Descriptions of Fungi and Bacteria. 3. doi:10.1079/DFB/20056400026.
- UK, Cab International; Booth, C.; Waterston, J. M. (1964). "Fusarium redolens . [Descriptions of Fungi and Bacteria]". Descriptions of Fungi and Bacteria. 3. doi:10.1079/DFB/20056400027.
- Booth, C. (1975). "The Present Status of Fusarium Taxonomy". Annual Review of Phytopathology. 13 (1): 83–93. Bibcode:1975AnRvP..13...83B. doi:10.1146/annurev.py.13.090175.000503.
- Kuhlman, E. G.; Dwinell, L. D.; Nelson, P. E.; Booth, C. (1978). "Characterization of the Fusarium Causing Pitch Canker of Southern Pines". Mycologia. 70 (6): 1131–1143. doi:10.1080/00275514.1978.12020330.
- UK, Cab International; Booth, C. (1978). "Fusarium semitectum . [Descriptions of Fungi and Bacteria]". Descriptions of Fungi and Bacteria. 58. doi:10.1079/DFB/20056400573.
- Parkinson, Verona O.; Sivanesan, A.; Booth, C. (1981). "The perfect state of the rice leaf scald fungus and the taxonomy of both the perfect and imperfect states". Transactions of the British Mycological Society. 76: 59–69. doi:10.1016/S0007-1536(81)80009-5.
- Booth, C. (1984). "The Fusarium problem: historical, economic and taxonomic aspects". In Moss, M.O.; Smith, J. E. (eds.). The applied mycology of Fusarium. Symposium of the British Mycological Society held at Queen Mary College, London, September 1982. Cambridge University Press. pp. 1–13. ISBN 0521279240.
- Booth, C.; Clayton, Y. M.; Usherwood, M. (1985). "Cylindrocarpon species associated with mycotic keratitis" (PDF). Proceedings of the Indian Academy of Sciences (Plant Science). 94 (2): 433–436. doi:10.1007/BF03053157. S2CID 82222180.

=== Books and pamphlets ===
- Booth, Colin. Studies of Pyrenomycetes. Mycological papers, no. 68, no.73, no. 74, no, 83 & no. 94. Kew, England: Commonwealth Mycological Institute. LCCN 57059049; volumes published from 1957 to 1964; 6 volumes in 5; illustrated
  - no. 68. 1957. no. 73 (PDF). 1959. no. 74. 1960. no. 83. 1961. no. 94. 1964.
- Booth, Colin. The genus Cylindrocarpon. Mycological papers, no. 104. Kew, England: Commonwealth Mycological Institute. LCCN 67112047; 56 pages; 2 plates, diagrams
- Booth, C. (1971). The Genus Fusarium. Commonwealth Agricultural Bureaux, for the Commonwealth Mycological Institute. ISBN 9780851980461.
  - pbk reprint. 1977.
- Booth, C., ed. (20 April 1971). Methods in Microbiology. Vol. 4. Academic Press. ISBN 9780080860305. (Booth contributed 2 chapters.)
  - Chapter I Introduction to General Methods (summary) Chapter II Fungal Culture Media (summary)
- Hawksworth, D. L.; Booth, C. (1974). A revision of the genus Zopfia Rabenh. Mycological papers, no. 135. Kew, England: Commonwealth Mycological Institute. LCCN 81461719.
- Booth, Colin (1976). Fusarium: A Laboratory Guide to the Identification of the Major Species. Commonwealth Mycological Institute. ISBN 0851983839; hbk; 58 pages
- Johnston, A.; Booth, Colin (1992). Plant Pathologists Pocket Book. CABI Publishing. ISBN 0851988415. OL 11600801M; pbk edition
