= Beemer (surname) =

Beemer is a surname. Notable people with the surname include:

- Allen D. Beemer (1842–1909), American sheriff
- Blake Beemer (born 1991), African-American baseball coach
- Bob Beemer (born 1955), American sound mixer
- Bob Beemer (American football) (born 1963), American football player
- Brace Beemer (1902–1965), American radio actor and announcer
- Bruce Beemer (born 1968), American politician
- Brandon Beemer (born 1980), American actor
- Horace Jansen Beemer (1845–1912), American/Canadian railway contractor and businessman

== See also ==
- Beamer (surname)
