= Bimmer =

Bimmer may refer to:

- Bimmer (film), a 2003 movie by Pyotr Buslov
- "Bimmer", a 2013 song by Tyler, the Creator from the album Wolf
- slang for BMW automobiles

== See also ==
- Beamer
- Beemer
