= Puahi =

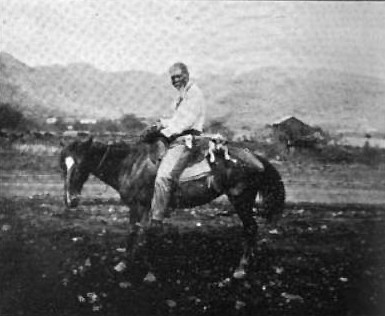
Puahi, the Mele singer of Moanalua with his dog riding behind him

Puahi also known as Puahi Kilinahe (Puahi), and Kilinahe Puahi I (Jan 1837 – March 9, 1910) was a native Hawaiian, the first son of Ke Aliʻi, Kilinahe with his first wife, Wahineole. He married Helelani and had three children, Mary Kapola, Kilinahe Puahi II and Kalikamaka. He was descended from noble chiefs.

Puahi became well known in the town of Honolulu by 1906. By the age of 60 he was considered a sensible gentleman, and would be seen riding his grey horse for errands back and forth from his home in Kaimuki, Hawaii although he was born in Moanalua and known as the Mele Singer of Moanalua. His small dog would ride astride the horse behind Puahi like a performing circus dog. He would often attend functions and luaus of Samuel Mills Damon where he would sing and chant in the old Hawaiian language as few could do.

Puahi was also a cowboy of the Kamehameha festivals and parades, receiving a special award in 1909 shortly before his death.

== Family Tree ==
Family Tree

Kalaipuwaa	Kaleimanokahoʻowaha
Paihewa	Maunakapu
Kilinahe (k) _{(1802- August 11, 1878)}	Wahineole (w)	Luika (w)	Lama (k)
Puahi	Helelani	Keoana	Keaka	Kaiapoepoe	Kahana	Ai (k)	Ahkau (k)	Namakalele	Namilimili	Kahihikua
