= Brick Palace =

Coordinates: 20°52′21″N 156°40′43″W

Artist's conception of the Brick Palace from the Lahaina Restoration Foundation

The Brick Palace was the first western-style structure built in the Hawaiian Islands for Kamehameha the Great to serve as the first Royal Palace. Lahaina became the seat of government for the Hawaiian Kingdom until 1845. The king commissioned the structure to be built at Keawa'iki point in Lahaina, Maui. Two foreign, ex-convicts from Australia's Botany Bay penal colony built the home. It was begun in 1798 and was completed after 4 years in 1802. The house was intended for Kamehameha's favorite and most powerful wife, Kaahumanu, but she refused to live in the structure and resided instead in a traditional Hawaiian-styled home only feet away.

Kamehameha used the building as part of his encampment in 1802, with over 1000 people in his entourage. The encampment area surrounding the building became a neighborhood known for the chiefly line associated with Kamehameha. Food was grown for the royal family and the area called the "Royal Taro Patch" was connected with this structure. After the unsuccessful war on Kauai, Kamehameha moved his court to Honolulu.

== Construction ==
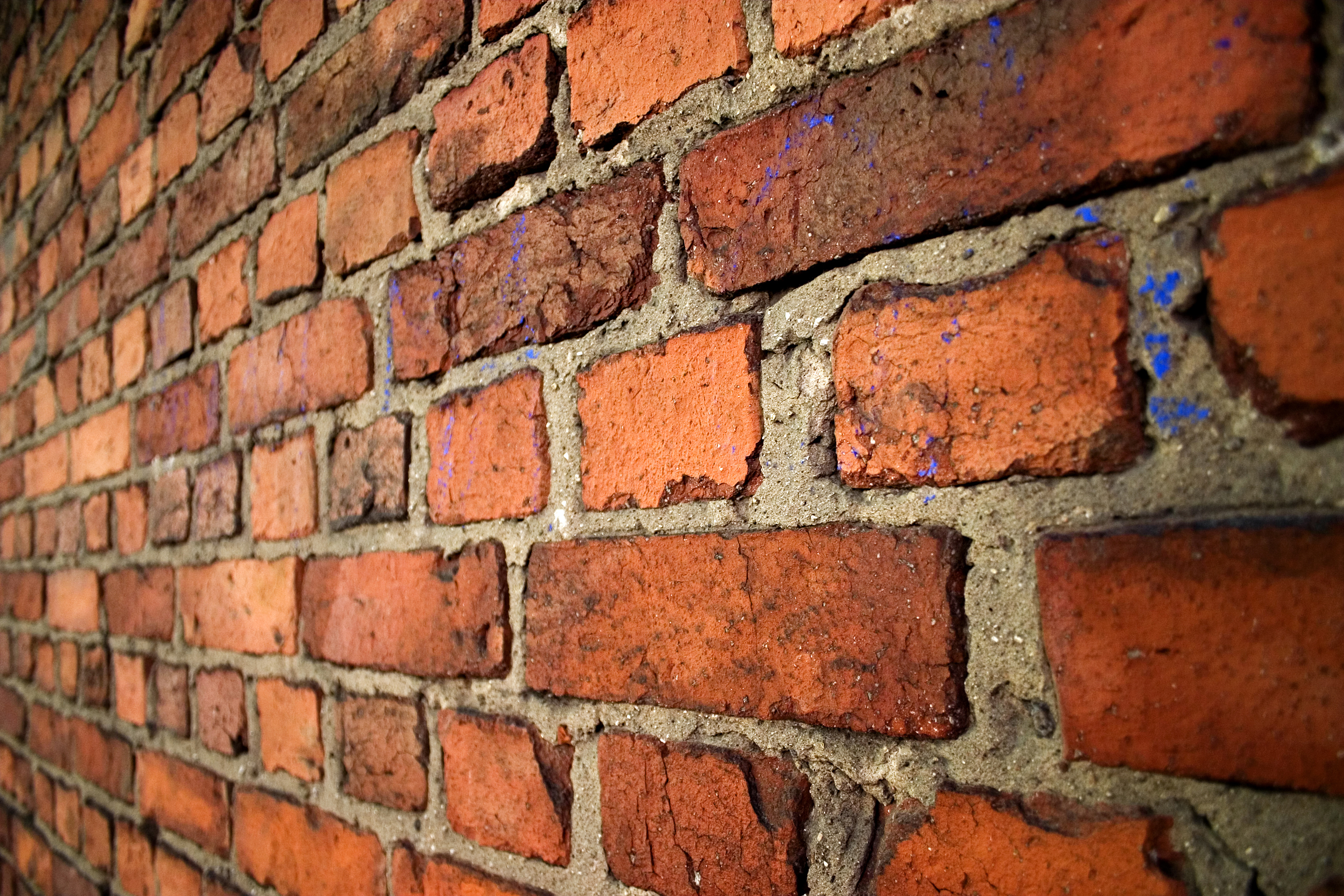
The Brick Palace of Kamehameha I was built using the "British bond" method of brick laying with a lavender-colored mortar

The site was selected because of the king's strong ties to the island of Maui. Two of his wives were from districts on the island, Kaʻahumanu and Keōpūolani. Kamehameha I was highly interested in western-style buildings. Prior to 1795 there were several shipwrecked foreigners on Oahu. From these foreigners, Kamehameha commissioned Mr. Mela (Miller) and Mr. Keka 'ele'ele (Black Jack), two escaped convicts from the penal colony of Australia, known as Botany Bay. Keka 'ele'ele was possibly the first black settler in the Hawaiian Islands. The two had been on the island since before the unification. After the Battle of Nuʻuanu they took Kamehameha's side.

The building was built on top of a mound enclosed with a dry masonry wall built of round rocks between one and two feet on diameter. The mound was larger than the structure and likely had a canoe landing; it was paved with black water-smoothed pebbles and probably formed part of a more ancient structure. The foundations are dry masonry stone resting on a level sand lens. The house was a two-story building made of some sort of red brick. The bricks were laid in a pattern known as "British bond", likely because the two people enlisted to build the structure originated from England. It had glazed windows and possibly a chimney. The construction is estimated to have required 92 tons of clay to make 38,500 bricks. Despite earlier accounts of the measurements, excavations uncovered the dimensions to be 41 feet long and 15 feet wide. It was divided into four rooms using Koa wood for the interior. Within 17 years the wall of the structure began to sag and needed attention. The main issue was the traditional mound the structure was built on, which was designed for a typical Hawaiian hut. The weight of the building was too much. To attempt a fix, the entire building was plastered with mortar.

== Archaeology ==
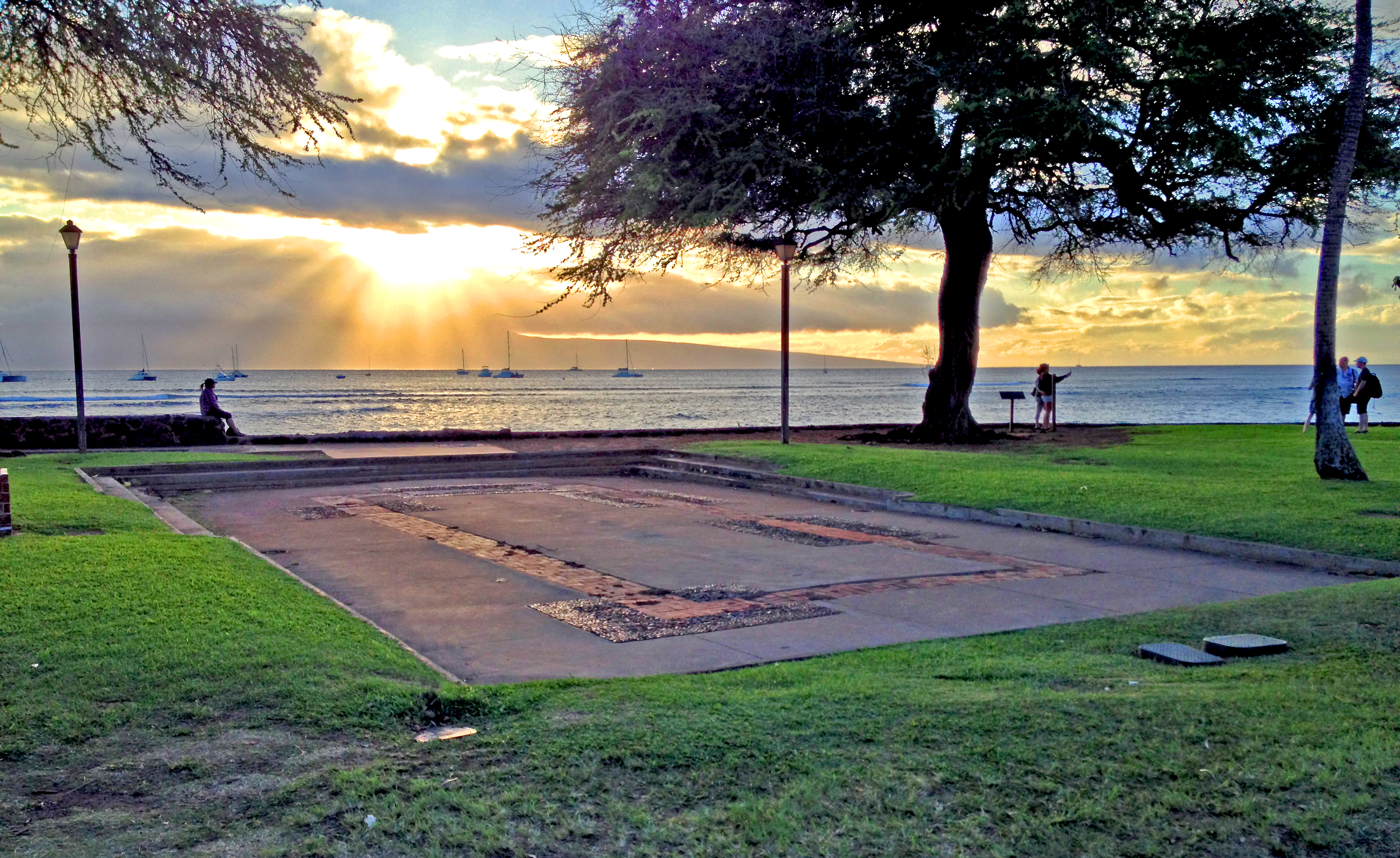
The remaining foundations of Kamehameha's Brick Palace were excavated in 1964 and can be seen in Lahaina, Maui.

In 1964 Kenneth P. Emory of the Bishop Museum invited two archaeologists to excavate the site. The excavations were to answer the question of the exact location, materials used and the precise dimensions. After pavement was removed from the site location, excavations began on December 9, 1964. Walter M. Fredericksen and Demaris L. Fredericksen published their report of the excavations in 1965. The report was prepared for the Maui Historical Commission.

=== Brick ===
The bricks used to build the house varied in quality and most were red in color. Samples found indicate that most were fired from a brownish local clay. The variation in each brick could be from experimentation or from badly collected material. While clearly fired, it is also clear the bricks were not well fired. Their size varied between 1 1/2 and 3 inches in thickness. All the bricks found were of a period before standard modern bricks were available. The mortar was made up mostly of sand and coral. Two types were found: a lavender-colored mortar made of sand and coral (reduced by burning for its lime) was found through most of the remains with the exception of the east corner, where there was a brown mortar which was a softer mixture of mud sand and coral pieces.

There were four courses of brick at the highest point of the remaining walls that were uncovered during excavations, all laid with their axes at right angles in the "British bond" brick-laying pattern. Three corners of the structure were found, designating the structure's total dimensions.

== Reconstruction ==
Today the site of the Brick Palace is located at Lahaina Banyan Court Park off Front Street in Lahaina, directly behind the public library. Part of Wharf Street was removed in 1964 when the original excavations took place and now curves into Papelekane Street.

A reconstructed outline of the palace structure is permanently displayed, set into a concrete base. A course of red is laid in the same manner as the original structure and clearly outlines the foundations and diameter of the structure.
