= Winona Beamer =

Background information
- Also known as: Auntie Nona
- Born: Winona Kapuailohiamanonokalani Desha Beamer; August 15, 1923; Honolulu, Territory of Hawaii
- Died: August 10, 2008 (aged 84) Lahaina, Maui
- Genres: Hawaiian
- Occupations: Singer, dancer, composer
- Instrument: Vocals

Winona Kapuailohiamanonokalani Desha Beamer (August 15, 1923 – April 10, 2008) was a champion of authentic and ancient Hawaiian culture, publishing many books, musical scores, as well as audio and video recordings on the subject. In her home state, she was known as Auntie Nona. She was an early proponent of the ancient form of the hula being perpetuated through teaching and public performances. Beamer was the granddaughter of Helen Desha Beamer. A cousin to Hawaiian Music Hall of Fame inductee Mahi Beamer, she teamed with him and her cousin Keola to form a touring North American troupe performing ancient hula and the Hawaiian art of storytelling. She was a teacher at Kamehameha Schools for almost 40 years, but had been expelled from that same school as a student in 1937 for dancing the standing hula. Beamer's sons Keola and Kapono are established performers in the Hawaiian music scene. Her grandson Kamanamaikalani Beamer is a professor at the University of Hawaii at Manoa and CEO of the Kohala Center. She ran a Waikiki hula studio for three decades. In 1997—indignant at proposals to cut Hawaiian curriculum from Kamehameha Schools—Beamer became the catalyst for public protest and legal investigation into Bishop Estate management, which eventually led to the removal or resignation of the trustees.

== Early life and background ==
She was born Winona Kapuailohiamanonokalani Desha Beamer to Pono and Louise Beamer on August 15, 1923, in Honolulu, United States Territory of Hawaii (a state since 1959). Much of her early life was spent on the island of Hawaii, under the guidance and tutelage of her grandmother, Helen Desha Beamer, who taught her hula at about the age of three.

As the cultural influence of the United States began to be felt on the territory, Beamer began to get more intensely involved in Hawaii's cultural heritage. Before she was a teenager, Beamer was composing meles by adding melodies to ancient chants. She attended Colorado Women's College, Barnard College, and Columbia University, studying anthropology.

Beamer is credited with coining the term "Hawaiiana" as early as 1948. In 1949, she became a high school instructor of Hawaiian culture at Kamehameha Schools, and served in that position for almost 40 years.

== Hula and Hawaiian storytelling ==
Beamer was briefly expelled in 1937 from the Kamehameha Schools for performing a standing hula. When Kamehameha Schools was established through the 1883 will of Bernice Pauahi Bishop, the original trustees of the Bishop Estate were Charles R. Bishop, Charles McEwen Hyde, Samuel M. Damon, Charles Montague Cooke, and William Owen Smith, who were either missionaries, or had ties to those in the profession. They found the hula too suggestive and had banned it from being performed at the school. The standing hula was not allowed to be performed on campus until the 1960s.

Beamer was a pivotal influence in reviving the art of the ancient hula, in the face of a more commercialized version invented for the tourism trade in Hawaii. Beamer, her cousin Mahi Beamer, and her brother, Keola, formed their own touring North American dance troupe to promote the authentic ancient hula and the Hawaiian art of storytelling. She ran her mother Louise's Waikiki hula studio for three decades. The storytelling culture of Hawaii was expressed as entertainment in the royal courts and the private homes of the ancient Hawaiians. It came in an era before the written word was used as a method of preserving the histories, genealogies, and mythologies of the Hawaiian people. Winona Beamer brought international attention to the hula and other forms of Hawaiian storytelling through music and the Native Hawaiian arts.

In 2000, Beamer alongside her hānai daughter Maile Beamer Loo formed the Hula Preservation Society (HPS), a non-profit dedicated to interviewing, videotaping, and perpetuating hula's most respected elders, capturing their knowledge, memories and stories. As of 2020, HPS has continued with Beamer's vision of perpetuating the rich culture, history and knowledge of hula and hula practitioners; interviewing almost a 100 hula elders, expert hula practitioners who had been born before 1930. Through the years, HPS has conducted not only one-on-one oral histories but also presented public panel discussions with beloved hula elders; resulting in a Hula Library of Ancient Hula types, implement and instrument types, chants, and kūpuna hula.

== Kamehameha Schools Bishop Estate ==
Winona Beamer had been the Hawaiian culture instructor at the Kamehameha Schools when the curriculum became in danger of being cut. She wrote a May 1997 letter to the Hawaii Supreme Court, expressing her concerns, and asking for the resignation of trustee Lokelani Lindsey. Beamer became the catalyst for a groundswell that led to an investigation of the Kamehameha Schools Bishop Estate trust. Her letter resulted in a public outcry over the management of the estate trust.

In November 1997, Beamer joined Isabella Aiona Abbott, Gladys A. Brandt, Roderick F. McPhee, and Winona Ellis Rubin in releasing a public statement calling for the removal of Lindsey from the Kamehameha Schools Bishop Estate. The statement was published in the Honolulu Star-Bulletin as part of its coverage of the investigation into the management of the trust. The investigation led to an investigation by the Hawaii attorney general, a reorganization of the trust, and the resignation of Lindsey.

== Death and legacy ==
She became known as Auntie Nona in Hawaii, and was a champion of teaching authentic Hawaiian culture. In the course of her life, she published multiple books, music scores, and audio and video recordings. In 1983, she and Richard Towill formed Ka Himeni Ana to encourage participation in authentic Hawaiian music. Beamer moved to Lahaina, on the island of Maui, in 2006. On April 10, 2008, she died in her sleep in Lahaina. She was survived by her musician sons Keola and Kapono, her only grandchild, Kamanamaikalani Beamer, and two Hānai (adopted, extended family) children: a daughter, Maile Loo Beamer, and a son, Kaliko Beamer-Trapp.

On August 27, 2020 a documentary titled Hawaiina was released about Beamer.

== Author bibliography, discography and filmography ==
=== Books ===
- Beamer, Winona (1976). Nā Hula O Hawaiʻi : the songs and dances of the Beamer family. Norfolk Island, Australia: Island Heritage., OCLC 7115723
- Beamer, Winona Desha; Kahalewai, Marilyn (1984). Talking Story with Nona Beamer : Stories of a Hawaiian Family. Bess Press. ISBN 978-0-935848-20-5., OCLC 11505946
- Beamer, Winona Desha (1985). Hawaiian Hula Chants. Beamer Hawaiīana., OCLC 19666351
- Beamer, Winona Desha (1987). Nā Mele Hula : a Collection of Hawaiian Hula Chants. Institute for Polynesian Studies, Brigham Young University—Hawaii Campus. ISBN 978-0-939154-42-5. OCLC 228665439.
- Beamer, Winona D. (1987). Nā Mele Hula 1. Inst. for Polynesian Studies, Brigham Young Univ. ISBN 978-0-939154-42-5. OCLC 180443309.
- Beamer, Winona Desha; Chu, Leona (1988). Hula ʻauana Index : as Taught by the Beamer Family. OCLC 63704078.
- Beamer, Winona; Ching, Patrick (1990). Helu Papa : Counting in Hawaiian, with Pī'a pā Alphabet. Hawaiian Resources Co. ISBN 978-0-9627294-0-9. OCLC 24567417.
- Beamer, Winona Desha; Cook, Mauliola; Trapp, S. Kaliko Beamer; Hewetson, Roy; Nishimitsu, Pōhaku (2001). Nā Mele Hula. Volume 2 : Hawaiian Hula Rituals and Chants. Institute for Polynesian Studies. ISBN 978-0-939154-57-9. OCLC 51862208.
- Beamer, Winona Desha; Loebel-Fried, Caren; Beamer-Trapp, Kaliko (2005). Pua Polū, the Pretty Blue Flower. Kamahoi Press. ISBN 978-1-58178-041-3. OCLC 60589985.
- Beamer, Nona; Caren Loebel-Fried; Kaliko Beamer-Trapp; Keola Beamer (2008). Naupaka. Kamahoi Press. ISBN 978-1-58178-089-5. OCLC 742304154.

=== Musical scores ===
- Songs for Hawaiʻi's Sunbeamers (1980–1981) Beamer Hawaiʻiana, Winona Desha Beamer, OCLC 16413868
- Traditional Chants and Hulas (1982) Beamer Hawaiʻiana, Winona Desha Beamer, Keʻala Brunke OCLC 8804499
- Na Mele Hula. : a Collection of 33 Hula Chants (1987) Institute for Polynesian Studies, Brigham Young University, Hawaiʻi Campus; Honolulu, Hawaii : Distributed for the Institute for Polynesian Studies by the University of Hawaii Press, Winona Desha Beamer ISBN 978-0-939154-57-9 OCLC 15656909

=== Audio ===
- "Songs for keikis (children)" (date unknown) Waikiki Records, 45 RPM, Winona Desha Beamer, Pauline Kekahuna, Hauoli Girls, OCLC 663116196
- Nona Beamer (1972) Custom Fidelity, LP, Winona Desha Beamer, OCLC 28675755
- The Menehune of Hawaii : the little people of Hawaiian legend (1982) Kalmar Records, LP, Winona Desha Beamer, Doug Hodge, OCLC 30931005
- Ancient Hawaiian Musical Instruments (1982) Kalmar Records, LP, Winona Desha Beamer OCLC 17312777
- Na Mele Hula. : Volume 1 a Collection of 33 Hula Chants (1987) Beamer Hawaiʻiana, Audio cassette tape, Winona Desha Beamer, OCLC 456103769
- Beamer, Winona Desha (1996). The Golden Lehua Tree : Stories and Music from the Heart of Hawaii's Beamer Family (Audio book). Starscape Music. OCLC 37274417.
- Hawaii 98 (1998) MGC Record, Compilation CD, Winona Desha Beamer and various artists OCLC 663113430
- Beamer, Winona Desha (2001). Nā Mele Hula. : Volume 2 : Hawaiian Hula Rituals and Chants (Audio book). Institute for Polynesian Studies. ISBN 978-0-939154-57-9. OCLC 55641229.
- Island dreams (2004) Koto World, LP, Winona Desha Beamer, Dragonfly OCLC 56762637
- We are ʻohana : Songs of Hope (2004) Winona Desha Beamer, Kaliko Beamer-Trapp, James McWhinney, Bruddah Kuz, Damon Williams, Faith Rivera, Rupert Tripp, Jr, Keola Beamer, Glynn Motoishi, Howard Shapiro OCLC 62523751

=== Video ===
- Beamer, Winona Desha; Vaughan, Palani; Zinn, Elaine; Tibbetts Jr., Richard J.(Director, writer, editor) (1986). "The Hawaiian Quilt : a Cherished Tradition" (VHS). Hawaii Craftsmen. OCLC 25320697.
- Beamer, Winona Desha; Glaser, Gaye; Hamasaki, Doug (Producer); Hewitt, Jim (Director) (1987). Hoʻolako 1987 : Celebrate the Hawaiian (VHS). Oceanic Cable Community Programming Center. OCLC 663660700.
- Beamer, Winona; Lindsey, Joan; Roes, Carol; Danuser, B. Kamaile (Host); Thompson, Sammie (Director); Fujimoto, Keoho (Script) (1987). Songs That Teach (VHS). Hawaiian Professional Songwriters' Society. OCLC 663146342.
- Beamer, Winona Desha (Narrator); Kenney, Ed (Narrator); Wentzel, Stan (Director and Writer); Arnone, Phil (Exec. Producer); Pennybacker, Robert (Director) (1988). Pele : the Fire Within (VHS). Lee Enterprises; KGMB (Television station : Honolulu, Hawaii). OCLC 663112608.
- Beamer, Winona Desha (1991). Ke Ao nani (instruments) (VHS). Beamer Hawaiʻiana. OCLC 663148741.
- Beamer, Winona Desha (1991). Laupāhoehoe (VHS). Beamer Hawaiʻiana. OCLC 28819562.
- Beamer, Winona Desha (1991). Molokaʻi Trilogy : Three Hulas of Molokaʻi (VHS). Beamer Hawaiʻiana. OCLC 663146822.
- Beamer, Winona Desha; Beamer, Louise Leiomalama (1991). Hawaiʻian Storytelling with the Beamer Family (VHS). Beamer Hawaiʻiana. OCLC 28822579.
- Beamer, Winona Desha; Beamer, Myrtle Kaʻuinohea (1991). Mi nei (VHS). Beamer Hawaiʻiana. OCLC 663146910.
- Beamer, Winona Desha (1991). Liliʻu e (Queen's hula) : he inoa nō Liliʻu (VHS). Beamer Hawaiʻiana. OCLC 663147805.
- Beamer, Winona Desha (1991). Liliʻuokalani (ʻōlapa chant hula) (VHA). Beamer Hawaiʻiana. OCLC 663147811.
- Beamer, Winona Desha; Beamer, Keola; Beamer, Kapono; Beamer, Kamana; Sorensen, Scott Eilif (Producer-Director) (1996). Nona Beamer and Her Family : a Century of Songs Celebrating Hawaiian Culture (VHS). Spectrum Hawaii-KHET TV, Honolulu. OCLC 663453272.
- Beamer, Winona Desha and various others (1997). Bishop Estate : Promises to Keep (VHS). KGMB. OCLC 663113482.
- Beamer, Winona Desha; Beamer, Keola; Beamer, Moanalani (1991). Keola Beamer, Moanalani Beamer, Nona Beamer (VHS). KHET-TV. OCLC 663398886.
- Beamer, Winona Desha and other performers (2002). Hiʻiaka, Lohiʻau & the Five Maile Sisters (DVD). Storybook Theatre of Hawaiʻi. OCLC 754971845.
- Beamer, Winona Desha; Park, Puluʻelo; Loo, Maile; Loo, Maile (2001). Voices of our kūpuna : World Conference on Hula, Hilo, Hawaiʻi, July 30, 2001 (VHS). Nā Maka o ka ʻĀina. OCLC 54110238.
- Beamer, Winona Desha; Jeffers, Mark (Executive director);Zelkovsky, Robert A. (editing) (2003). Queen Emmalani : a Hawaiian Story (Videodisc). Storybook Theatre of Hawaiʻi. OCLC 253719215.
- Beamer, Winona Desha; Takamine, Vicky; Loo, Maile (2004). Nona Beamer and Maile Loo Talk About Hula : March 9, 2004 (VHS). Hula Preservation Society; UH Manoa Department of Theatre and Dance. OCLC 318076932.
- Beamer, Winona et al. (2001). Kona Hema = South Kona (DVD). Nā Maka o ka ʻĀina. OCLC 318076963.

== Family tree ==
Beamer, Desha, Kāneakua, Miller family tree

**Key- Subjects with bold titles and blue bold box= Aliʻi line. Bold title and grey bolded box= Lower ranking Aliʻi line. Bold title and un-bolded box= European nobility. Regular name and box= makaʻāinana or untitled foreign subject**.

**Mela (Miller)**	**Kānekapōlei** (Note: Hawaiian researcher Dorothy Barrère lists Kanekapolei as the wife of Mela (Miller) on page 458 of her book from the full Mahele land claim of Kanekapolei's son Alika Mela- LCA 8018.)	**Kaialii**	**Poimoa**	**Kilinahe**	**Lama (w)**
**Alexander P. Miller Jr.** **(Alika Mela)** (Note: Kaʻanoʻi Walk writes in an article for the Hawaiian Cultural Center: "..my great-grandfather John Mahiʻai Kāneakua was born in Honuaʻula, Maui to his loving parents Alexander P. Miller and Kanuha (Kaialiilii) Miller".)	**Kapuailohia Wahine Kanuha Kaialiilii**. (Note: Kapuailohiawahine and her daughter Isabella, taught Hula in secret, hiding it after the ban by Kaʻahumanu.)	Ai	**Namakalele**
Charles Makee (Note: The son of Charles Makee (the son of James Makee, a wealthy sea Captain) Charles Miller was the son of "Sarah Miller, written as "S. Mila" on the marriage record".)	**Sarah Kaʻili Miller**	**John Mahiʻai Miller/Kaneakua** (Oct. 9, 1860-Jan. 26, 1936); **County Clerk of Kaua‘i**; Hui Hawaiian Aloha ʻĀina	Lucy Kaʻumealani Cummings	**Samuel Kalimahana Kaialiilii Miller**. (Note: Hawaii State Archives lists Samuel Kaia Miller marrying Amoy Ai on 5-2-1903 in Honolulu, Hawaii.) (Note: The Marriage certificate of Samuel and Daisy Amoe Ai lists Alika Miller and Kanuha as parents to Samuel, with Namakelele and Ai as parent to Daisy. (Note: State of Hawaii Department of Health, Office of Health Status Monitoring, Certificate of Marriage, May 2, 1903)) (1868-Nov. 24, 1933)	**Daisy Amoe Ai** (Note: Daisy Amoe and Samuel Kalimahana Miller had 12 children and resided in Kalihi where Samuel worked as a painter.)	George Langhern Desha	**Isabella Haleʻala Kaʻili Miller** (Note: In a press release from the Hula Preservation Society, they list Isabella Hale`ala Miller Desha as Nona Beamer's great grandmother.) (Note: The Desha Genealogy lists William Francis Desha as the son of Isabella and George Desha.) (1865-Feb. 28, 1949)	**Noa Miller**
**Charles Miller**	Sakichi Hayashi	**Annie Maikaʻi Miller**	Charles Hoolulu Siemsen	Peter Carl Beamer	**Helen Kapuailohia Desha** (Sept. 8, 1882–Sept. 25, 1952)	**David Lester Desha**
**James Waichiro Miller**	**Milton Hoʻolulu Beamer** (October 18, 1903 (Note: Hawaii Births and Christenings, 1852-1933. Milton Hoolulu Desha Beamer, 18 Oct 1903; citing Hilo, Hawaii, Hawaii, reference p 36; FHL microfilm 1,031,747.) - )	Kaaloehukaiopuaena Copp	**Francis Kealiʻinohopono Beamer**	Louise Leiomälama	**Harriet Kekahiliokalani Beamer**	**Peter Carl Kaleikaʻapunihonua Beamer Jr.**	**Helen Elizabeth Kawohikukapulani Beamer**
**Mahi Beamer**	Odell Steppe	**Winona Beamer**
**Keola Beamer**	Kapono Beamer
