= Mahi Beamer =

- Cover art 1959 LP

Background information
- Born: Edwin Mahiai Copp Beamer; December 5, 1928; Honolulu, Territory of Hawaii, U.S.
- Died: July 14, 2017 (aged 88) Honolulu, Territory of Hawaii, U.S.
- Genres: Hawaiian
- Occupations: Singer, dancer, composer
- Instruments: Vocals, piano, glockenspiel

Edwin Mahiʻai (Mahi) Copp Beamer (December 5, 1928 – July 14, 2017) was an American tenor falsetto singer, composer and hula dancer of Hawaiian ancestry. He was born in Honolulu in the Territory of Hawaii and is the grandson of Helen Desha Beamer. His father, Milton Hoʻolulu Desha Beamer Sr. was her son. Mahi's mother was Mildred Kaaloehukaiopuaena Copp Beamer. In 2006, Mahi Beamer was inducted into the Hawaiian Music Hall of Fame. He was named a "Living Treasure of Hawaii" in 2008 by the Honpa Hongwanji Mission of Hawaii, which has been recognizing Hawaii's treasures since 1976. He received the 1992 State of Hawaii Recognition Award for his musical contributions to the state and for perpetuating his grandmother's music. Beamer was the 1993 recipient of the David Malo award presented by Rotary International for his cultural contributions.

Beamer is a 1946 graduate of Kamehameha Schools and went on to continue his musical education at University of California, Santa Barbara and Juilliard School of Music. He is a cousin to Winona Beamer and once toured North America with Winona and her son Keola performing the ancient Hawaiian form of the hula. He served in the United States Army during the post-World War II years at Schofield Barracks at Wahiawa on the island of Oahu, where he played classical piano and the glockenspiel. His civilian music career got its start with a three-year stint singing at the Queen's Surf in Waikiki. In 1959, Beamer had an uncredited part as a singer in the Columbia Pictures movie Forbidden Island, which starred Jon Hall and was filmed on location in Hawaii. Beamer performed at Carnegie Hall in New York City, and for thirteen years was a featured performer of Nalani Kele's Polynesian Review at the Stardust Resort and Casino in Paradise, Nevada. Beamer performed at numerous venues in his home state of Hawaii, and recorded many of his grandmother's compositions. The Hawai'i Academy of Recording Arts gave Beamer its Lifetime Achievement Award in 1991.

Mahi Beamer died at Kuakini Medical Center in Honolulu on July 14, 2017, at the age of 88.

== Singles discography (partial list) ==
Source: allmusic

- "Halehuki"
- "He Makana"
- "Kahuli-Aku Kahuli-Mai" (arranger)
- "Kawohikukapulani"
- "Ke Aliʻi Hulu Mamo"
- "Keawaiki Hula"
- "Ke Haʻa la Puna"
- "Kimo Hula" (composer, along with Helen Desha Beamer)
- "Kinue"
- "Lei ʻIlima"
- "Mahaiʻula"
- "Moanikeʻala"
- "Na Hala O Naue"
- "Nohili" (also composer)
- "Paniau"
- "Pua Maeʻole"
- "Pua Malihini"
- "Puʻuwaʻawaʻa (Pihanakalani)"

== Family tree ==
Beamer, Desha, Kāneakua, Miller family tree

**Key- Subjects with bold titles and blue bold box= Aliʻi line. Bold title and grey bolded box= Lower ranking Aliʻi line. Bold title and un-bolded box= European nobility. Regular name and box= makaʻāinana or untitled foreign subject**.

**Mela (Miller)**	**Kānekapōlei** (Note: Hawaiian researcher Dorothy Barrère lists Kanekapolei as the wife of Mela (Miller) on page 458 of her book from the full Mahele land claim of Kanekapolei's son Alika Mela- LCA 8018.)	**Kaialii**	**Poimoa**	**Kilinahe**	**Lama (w)**
**Alexander P. Miller Jr.** **(Alika Mela)** (Note: Kaʻanoʻi Walk writes in an article for the Hawaiian Cultural Center: "..my great-grandfather John Mahiʻai Kāneakua was born in Honuaʻula, Maui to his loving parents Alexander P. Miller and Kanuha (Kaialiilii) Miller".)	**Kapuailohia Wahine Kanuha Kaialiilii**. (Note: Kapuailohiawahine and her daughter Isabella, taught Hula in secret, hiding it after the ban by Kaʻahumanu.)	Ai	**Namakalele**
Charles Makee (Note: The son of Charles Makee (the son of James Makee, a wealthy sea Captain) Charles Miller was the son of "Sarah Miller, written as "S. Mila" on the marriage record".)	**Sarah Kaʻili Miller**	**John Mahiʻai Miller/Kaneakua** (Oct. 9, 1860-Jan. 26, 1936); **County Clerk of Kaua‘i**; Hui Hawaiian Aloha ʻĀina	Lucy Kaʻumealani Cummings	**Samuel Kalimahana Kaialiilii Miller**. (Note: Hawaii State Archives lists Samuel Kaia Miller marrying Amoy Ai on 5-2-1903 in Honolulu, Hawaii.) (Note: The Marriage certificate of Samuel and Daisy Amoe Ai lists Alika Miller and Kanuha as parents to Samuel, with Namakelele and Ai as parent to Daisy. (Note: State of Hawaii Department of Health, Office of Health Status Monitoring, Certificate of Marriage, May 2, 1903)) (1868-Nov. 24, 1933)	**Daisy Amoe Ai** (Note: Daisy Amoe and Samuel Kalimahana Miller had 12 children and resided in Kalihi where Samuel worked as a painter.)	George Langhern Desha	**Isabella Haleʻala Kaʻili Miller** (Note: In a press release from the Hula Preservation Society, they list Isabella Hale`ala Miller Desha as Nona Beamer's great grandmother.) (Note: The Desha Genealogy lists William Francis Desha as the son of Isabella and George Desha.) (1865-Feb. 28, 1949)	**Noa Miller**
**Charles Miller**	Sakichi Hayashi	**Annie Maikaʻi Miller**	Charles Hoolulu Siemsen	Peter Carl Beamer	**Helen Kapuailohia Desha** (Sept. 8, 1882–Sept. 25, 1952)	**David Lester Desha**
**James Waichiro Miller**	**Milton Hoʻolulu Beamer** (October 18, 1903 (Note: Hawaii Births and Christenings, 1852-1933. Milton Hoolulu Desha Beamer, 18 Oct 1903; citing Hilo, Hawaii, Hawaii, reference p 36; FHL microfilm 1,031,747.) - )	Kaaloehukaiopuaena Copp	**Francis Kealiʻinohopono Beamer**	Louise Leiomälama	**Harriet Kekahiliokalani Beamer**	**Peter Carl Kaleikaʻapunihonua Beamer Jr.**	**Helen Elizabeth Kawohikukapulani Beamer**
**Mahi Beamer**	Odell Steppe	**Winona Beamer**
**Keola Beamer**	Kapono Beamer
