= Horace Jansen Beemer =

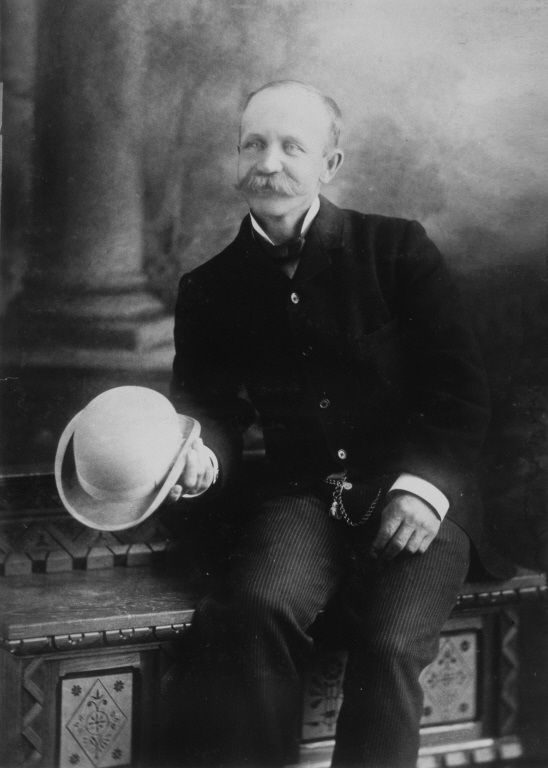
H. J. Beemer, 1881

Horace Jansen Beemer (c. 1845 – July 22, 1912) was an American railway contractor and businessman active in Canada.

Little is known of Beemer before he came to Canada in the 1870s and was employed on the Welland Canal. He was soon involved in contracts of his own including a municipal water system in Quebec City and a railway contract with the fr:Quebec and Lake St-John Railway. Up until about 1900, his business interests grew and prospered. After that time, his activity and influence diminished.

While Horace Beemer never became a top level decision-maker and financier, he did contribute substantially to the construction of railways and the operation of related businesses.

He died in London in 1912.

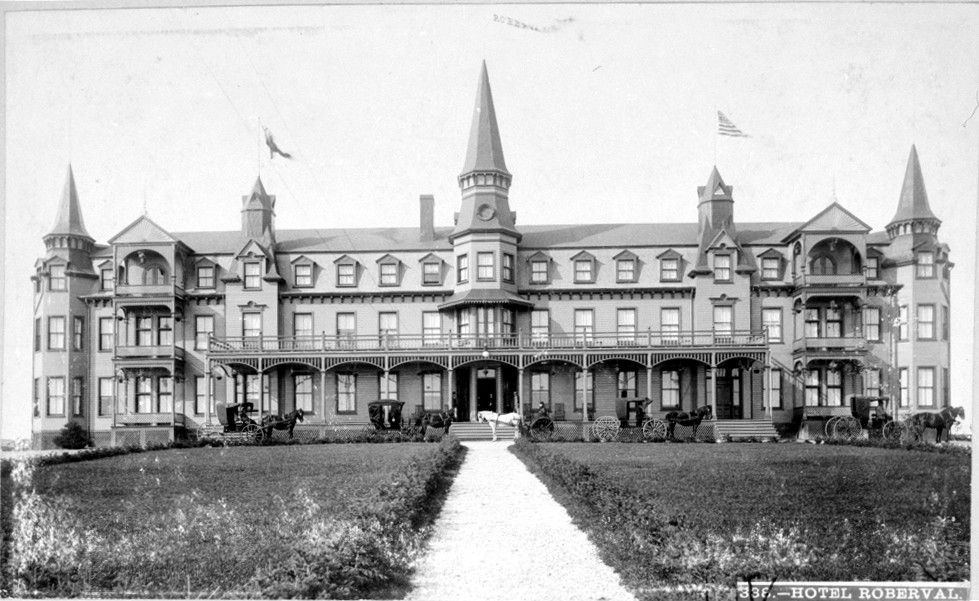
Hotel Roberval or Beemer Hotel
