= Helen Desha Beamer =

American singer

Background information
- Born: Helen Kapuailohia Desha; September 8, 1882; Honolulu, Kingdom of Hawaii
- Died: September 25, 1952 (aged 70)
- Genre: Hawaiian
- Occupations: Singer, musician, composer
- Instruments: Vocals, Piano

Helen Kapuailohia Desha Beamer (September 8, 1882 – September 25, 1952) was a musician, composer of songs in the Hawaiian language, hula dancer and coloratura soprano of Hawaiian ancestry. Her descendants have also become accomplished artists in the U.S. state of Hawaii. In 1928, her duet of "Ke Kali Nei Au" with Sam Kapu Sr. on Columbia Records was the first commercial recording of the Charles E. King composition. She was inducted into the Hawaiian Music Hall of Fame in 1995.

== Early life ==
Helen Kapuailohia Desha was born on September 8, 1882, in Honolulu, on the island of Oahu, in the Kingdom of Hawaii. Her parents were George Langhern Desha and Isabella Hale'ala Miller. Her mother and grandmother, Kapuailohiawahine Kanuha Miller, taught hula in secret when the dance was banned. Her grandmother was a notable hakumele, Hawaiian for composer of music. Helen was a graduate of Kamehameha School for Girls, where the school's music director noted her talent as a pianist and as a song composer. Kamehameha Schools was established by the estate of Bernice Pauahi Bishop to provide education for children of Hawaiian ancestry.

She was also the organist at Haili Church in Hilo.

== Professional career ==
She had a coloratura soprano range and was a recording artist for Columbia Records. In 1928, she and artist Sam Kapu Sr. made the first commercial recording of the "Hawaiian Wedding Song," which had been written by composer Charles E. King as "Ke Kali Nei Au". She was the composer of numerous songs in the Hawaiian language that are still being recorded by contemporary Hawaiian artists.

== Personal life and legacy ==
Helen Desha married Peter Carl Beamer of Hilo. The couple had five children. She was the matriarch of a musical dynasty that includes her grandson, falsetto singer Mahi Beamer, who was inducted into the Hawaiian Music Hall of Fame in 2006; granddaughter Winona (Nona) Beamer; and Nona Beamer's two sons, Keola and Kapono. She died in 1952 and is buried at Homelani Memorial Park in Hilo.

In 1995, she was inducted into the Hawaiian Music Hall of Fame.

== Compositions (partial list) ==
Source: allmusic

- "Halehuki"
- "He Makana"
- "Kaʻahumanu"
- "Kawohikukapulani"
- "Ke Aliʻi Hulu Mamo"
- "Keawaiki"
- "Ke Haʻa la Puna"
- "Kimo Hula"
- "Kinue"
- "Lei O Haʻena"
- "Mahaiʻula"
- "Moanikeʻala"
- "Pua Malihini"
- "Pupu Hinuhinu"
- "Puʻuanahulu"
- "Puʻuwaʻawaʻa (Pihanakalani)"

== Family tree ==
Beamer, Desha, Kāneakua, Miller family tree

**Key- Subjects with bold titles and blue bold box= Aliʻi line. Bold title and grey bolded box= Lower ranking Aliʻi line. Bold title and un-bolded box= European nobility. Regular name and box= makaʻāinana or untitled foreign subject**.

**Mela (Miller)**	**Kānekapōlei** (Note: Hawaiian researcher Dorothy Barrère lists Kanekapolei as the wife of Mela (Miller) on page 458 of her book from the full Mahele land claim of Kanekapolei's son Alika Mela- LCA 8018.)	**Kaialii**	**Poimoa**	**Kilinahe**	**Lama (w)**
**Alexander P. Miller Jr.** **(Alika Mela)** (Note: Kaʻanoʻi Walk writes in an article for the Hawaiian Cultural Center: "..my great-grandfather John Mahiʻai Kāneakua was born in Honuaʻula, Maui to his loving parents Alexander P. Miller and Kanuha (Kaialiilii) Miller".)	**Kapuailohia Wahine Kanuha Kaialiilii**. (Note: Kapuailohiawahine and her daughter Isabella, taught Hula in secret, hiding it after the ban by Kaʻahumanu.)	Ai	**Namakalele**
Charles Makee (Note: The son of Charles Makee (the son of James Makee, a wealthy sea Captain) Charles Miller was the son of "Sarah Miller, written as "S. Mila" on the marriage record".)	**Sarah Kaʻili Miller**	**John Mahiʻai Miller/Kaneakua** (Oct. 9, 1860-Jan. 26, 1936); **County Clerk of Kaua‘i**; Hui Hawaiian Aloha ʻĀina	Lucy Kaʻumealani Cummings	**Samuel Kalimahana Kaialiilii Miller**. (Note: Hawaii State Archives lists Samuel Kaia Miller marrying Amoy Ai on 5-2-1903 in Honolulu, Hawaii.) (Note: The Marriage certificate of Samuel and Daisy Amoe Ai lists Alika Miller and Kanuha as parents to Samuel, with Namakelele and Ai as parent to Daisy. (Note: State of Hawaii Department of Health, Office of Health Status Monitoring, Certificate of Marriage, May 2, 1903)) (1868-Nov. 24, 1933)	**Daisy Amoe Ai** (Note: Daisy Amoe and Samuel Kalimahana Miller had 12 children and resided in Kalihi where Samuel worked as a painter.)	George Langhern Desha	**Isabella Haleʻala Kaʻili Miller** (Note: In a press release from the Hula Preservation Society, they list Isabella Hale`ala Miller Desha as Nona Beamer's great grandmother.) (Note: The Desha Genealogy lists William Francis Desha as the son of Isabella and George Desha.) (1865-Feb. 28, 1949)	**Noa Miller**
**Charles Miller**	Sakichi Hayashi	**Annie Maikaʻi Miller**	Charles Hoolulu Siemsen	Peter Carl Beamer	**Helen Kapuailohia Desha** (Sept. 8, 1882–Sept. 25, 1952)	**David Lester Desha**
**James Waichiro Miller**	**Milton Hoʻolulu Beamer** (October 18, 1903 (Note: Hawaii Births and Christenings, 1852-1933. Milton Hoolulu Desha Beamer, 18 Oct 1903; citing Hilo, Hawaii, Hawaii, reference p 36; FHL microfilm 1,031,747.) - )	Kaaloehukaiopuaena Copp	**Francis Kealiʻinohopono Beamer**	Louise Leiomälama	**Harriet Kekahiliokalani Beamer**	**Peter Carl Kaleikaʻapunihonua Beamer Jr.**	**Helen Elizabeth Kawohikukapulani Beamer**
**Mahi Beamer**	Odell Steppe	**Winona Beamer**
**Keola Beamer**	Kapono Beamer
