= Beamer (occupation) =

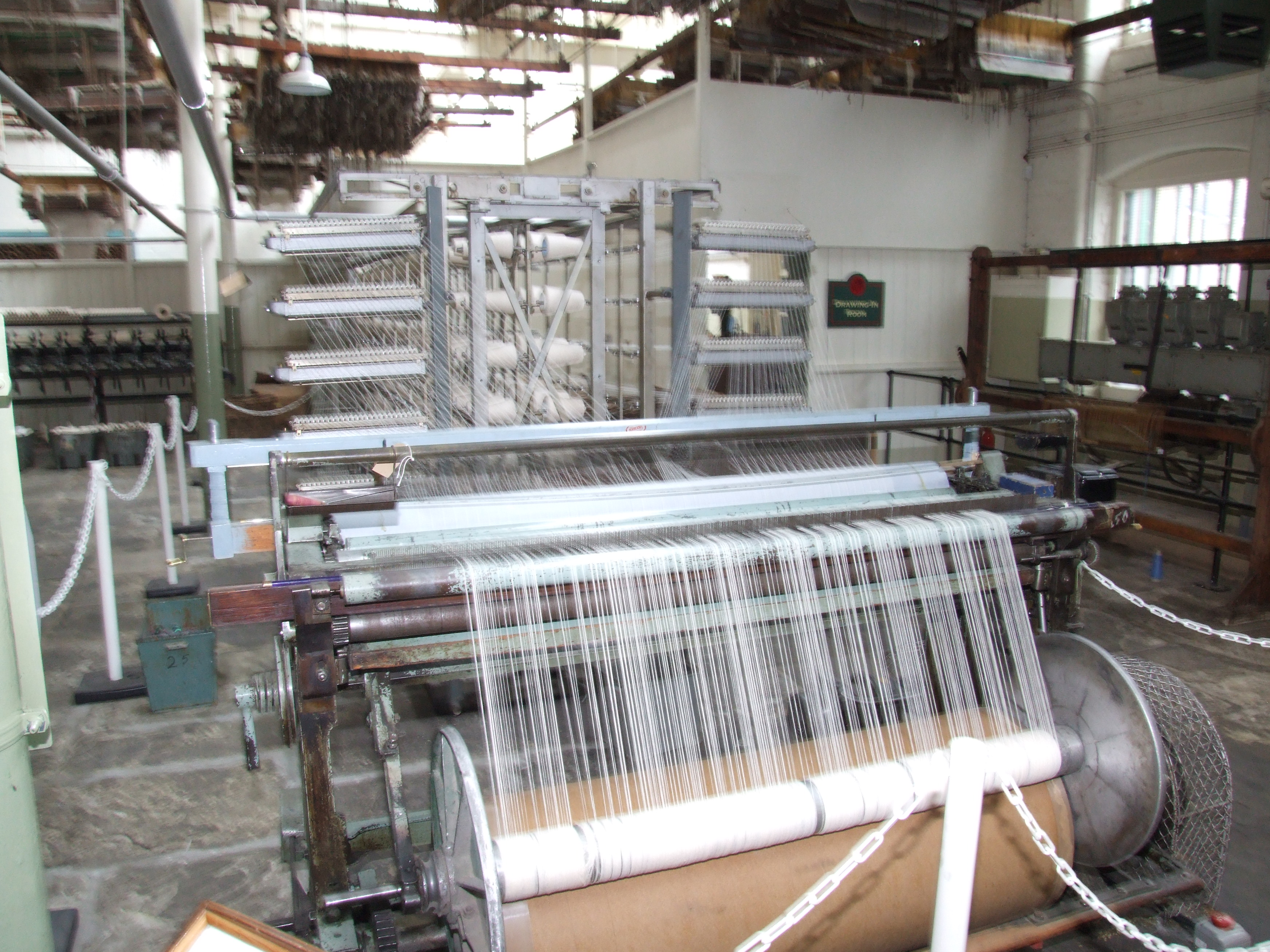
Beaming onto a taper's beam. This example is on display at Queen Street Mill Textile Museum, Harle Syke Burnley

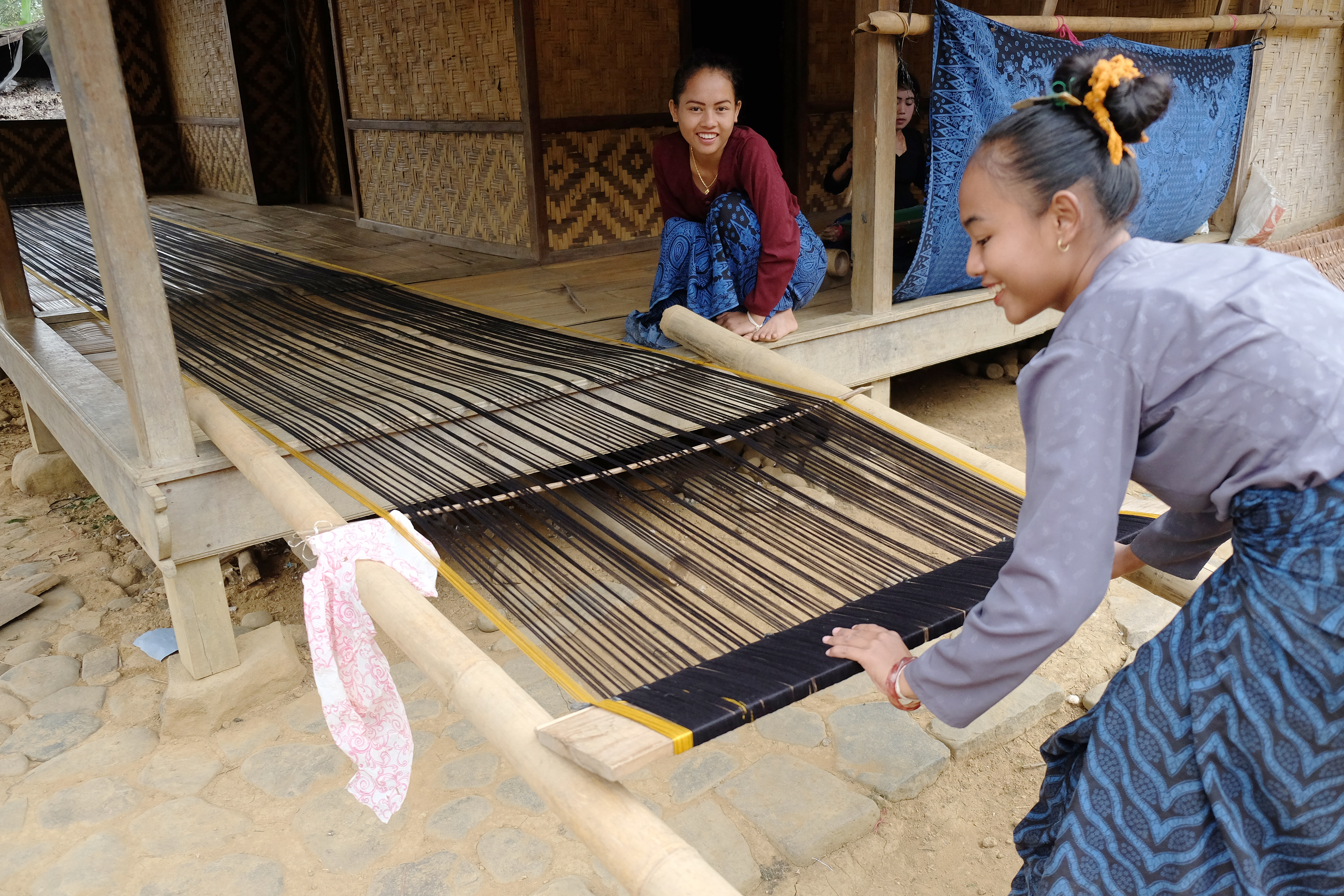
Manual beaming. Wrapping the warp threads around the warp beam of a loom in preparation for weaving.

A beamer was an occupation in the cotton industry. The taper's beam is a long cylinder with flanges where 400 plus ends (threads) are wound side-by-side. Creels of bobbins with the correct thread, mounted on a beaming frame wind their contents onto the beam. The machine is watched over by a "beamer".

In early days beaming was often done in the weaving shed but later the process tended to be transferred to the spinning mill. The spinners would send lorries loaded with of beams wound with thread of the ordered specification (Note: The specification contained information on the quality and count of the yarn, this would be different for warp and weft. The cotton count was the thickness of the yarn and it was measured by counting the number of strands of 840 imperial yard length could be contained in a package of one imperial pound weight. The quality included details of twist, origin, grade, combed or super combed and any further finishing process: Mercerising, Gassing, Dyeing) to the weavers. Several tapers beams would be attached to creels on the Tape Sizing machine, and the threads from these would be sized and combined to create the smaller weavers beams. As a rule of thumb, a tapers beam had thread long enough to make 20 weavers beams.

Colloquially, the term beamer was used for anyone responsible for moving beams of yarn. In a weaving shed that bought its yarn on the beam, the Beamer would be the operative who carried new beams to the looms and gaited them.. A 'drawer-in' was sometimes referred to as a beamer.
