= Kilinahe =

- Ke Aliʻi
- Born: c. 1802; Moanalua, Honolulu, Hawaii
- Died: December 11, 1878
- Spouse: Wahinole, Luika, Lama
- Issue: Puahi, Kaiapoepoe, Namakalele, Kahihikua
Names
- Kilinahe
- House: House of Moana and House of Kamehameha

Ke Aliʻi Kilinahe (c. 1802 – December 11, 1878) was a kaukau aliʻi noble who served under the ruling ali'i nui of the islands of Hawaii, Maui and Oahu, during the Kingdom of Hawaii. He is of the House of Moana and a collateral family of the House of Kamehameha. He performed his hana lawelawe or "service task" under Ka'ahumanu and Kamehameha III, starting as a kāhili bearer and royal attendant. He was brought into the Royal Court by Charles Kanaina to assume all of his duties and responsibilities. He toured Oahu with the Royal Circuit and managed the chief's goods. Kilinahe, in the Hawaiian language, means "light rain".

== Birth, parentage and family ==
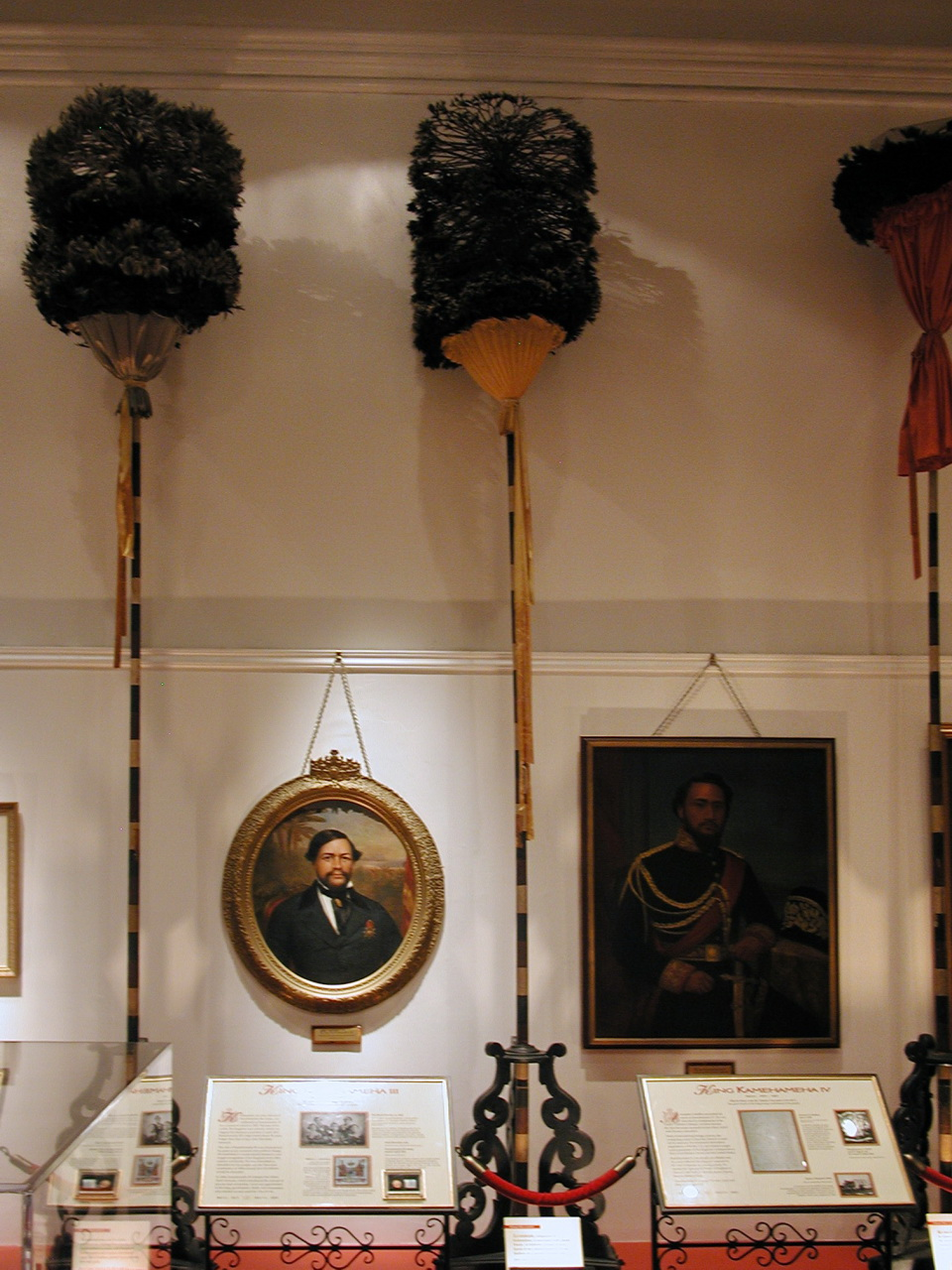
Kilinahe was a kāhili bearer for Kaʻahumanu and Kamehameha III. Shown are some the royal standards of Kauikeaouli.

Kilinahe was of a great grandson of Moana Wahine of the princely House of Moana, a collateral family of the House of Kamehameha. Kilinahe's natural father was Paihewa and his natural mother was called Maunakapu. His maternal grandmother, Kaleimanokahoʻowaha (Note: Kaleimanokahoowaha was a sister of Kauwa by Moana Wahine and Nohomualani. Kanaina was a son of Moana Wahine and Keaweopala.) was a daughter of Moana Wahine and Palila Nohomualani, making him first cousin to Charles Kanaina, second cousin of Lunalilo and the grand nephew of Kanaina I. He was born in Lahaina, Maui Hawaii. Kilinahe stated; "I was born when Kamehameha 1st cultivated potatoes on round tops just after the Battle of Nuuanu". He was the hanai adopted son of Kahuakao and his mother Kalamaie, both of whom held Royal patents in Kilinahe's name.

=== Royal attendant, House of Kamehameha ===
Charles Kanaina brought in Kilinahe as one of his closest relatives, to assume all of his service duties in the Royal Court of Kamehameha III. As an aliʻi who served the ruling Ali'i nui, Kilinahe performed his hana lawelawe (in the Hawaiian language "service task") under Ka'ahumanu while she served as Kuhina Nui alongside Kamehameha III, her co-ruler. He starting as a kāhili bearer and royal attendant. When Kanaina was elevated in the House of Kamehameha through his marriage to Miriam Auhea Kekāuluohi, Kilinahe would take over all of his official responsibilities. Kilinahe would tour Oahu with the Royal Circuit and manage the chief's goods. The Royal Circuit was a famous tour of the king made to locations around the island to visit citizens and encourage them to read and write, instruct the land agents and encourage the teachers and make sure they were well cared for.

Kaʻahumanu died June 5, 1832. In November 1833, Kilinahe was one of two armed royal attendants that accompanied Kanaina, Kekūanaōʻa, Kīnaʻu, and Hoapili to the Kings home at Hale-uluhe on the Beretania grounds in order to convince him to name Kina'u Premier of the Kingdom instead of Liliha, Boki's wife. The very act of entering the Kings place was considered to be a death sentence but they were convinced by Hoapili that the guards would not fire upon them. The group entered the kings palace unannounced. When Kamehameha III saw them he fell into tears at seeing his foster mother's for the first time in many years. Hoapili begged the king that if he should proclaim Liliha premier that he should first kill him so that he should not be blamed for Liliha's accent. He presented Kina'u as the daughter of the house of Kamehameha and asked that she serve the King, who agreed but stated that Liliha should be informed. When called upon, Liliha was found drunk. A few days later it was made official.

=== Chief of lands and Konohiki ===
Kilinahe was named an ali'i chief of land by Kamehameha The Great in 1808. Kahuakao and his mother Kalamaie both held royal patents in Kilinahe's name. After being brought into the Royal Court by his cousin, Kilinahe would sometimes stay with at Kanaina's Pohukaina estate. After the royal court, Kilinahe would work as a konohiki on Oahu until being discharged. In R. Keelikolani vs D. Manaku (1880), the court wrote that simply by being discharged from his management of the Moanalua lands by the then owner, Kamehameha V, said nothing about losing life tenure of the lands as Konohiki. However, after being discharged he moved back to Lahaina, living there for almost 15 years until Kanaina would again bring him back to the Capitol just before both their deaths in 1877 and 78.

== Estate Probates ==
During the period of the late Hawaiian Kingdom, Lunalilo was known to be the largest land owner in Hawaii from inheritance passed to him from his mother, Kekāuluohi and from Kīnaʻu. All of the main family had died, leaving Kanaina to become the holder of the largest collection of lands in Hawaii by the time of his death. Kilinahe was brought back to Oahu to testify to the Supreme court on Kanaina's behalf over a lost will of Kekāuluohi and stayed until his death during the probate hearings of the Kanaina estate.

=== Kekāuluohi; lost will ===
Kekāuluohi died June 7, 1845. In March 1876, Kanaina requested probate of a lost will by parole proof of its contents. It was stated that the will was destroyed after her death. The witnesses included Auwai, Kilinahe and Samuel Kamakau. Kilinahe would be brought back to Honolulu to testify for the proof of the last will and testament of Kekāuluohi, Kanaina's wife and the mother of Lunalilo. He remained in Honolulu until his death December 11, 1878.

=== Kanaina probate ===
Charles Kanaina died intestate on March 13, 1877. Even though he had prepared a will, it left everything to his son, William Lunalilo, who himself had died several years before. Litigation through the Hawaiian Supreme Court over the span of several years took place in order to adjudicate heirs to the largest collection of private lands in the Kingdom of Hawaii. Kanaina's land was sold at auction and funds used to disperse his estate to eight heirs.

Petitioners to the court included King David Kalākaua for his two sisters, Liliuokalani and Likelike, Keʻelikōlani, Bernice Pauahi Bishop, Kilinahe as well as several other distant relatives with their representatives.

== Marriage, personal life and family ==
Kilinahe was married several times. With his first wife, Wahineole, he had a son, Puahi who married Helelani and had three children, Mary Kapola, Kilinahe Puahi II and Kalikamaka. His second wife was Luika, a granddaughter of Keaweheulu and great granddaughter of Heulu. Kilinahe's third and final wife was Lama Puahi. They were married in 1853 by Father Medisti. They had several children. Their first child was Sam Kaiapoepoe who married Kahana. Their second child was a daughter named Namakalele who married Ai, and a third daughter named Kahihikua, married as well.

Namakalele's daughter, Daisy Amoe Ai, married Samuel Kalimahana Miller, who shared the same parentage as John Mahiʻai Kāneakua to Ali'i chiefly lines through their father Alika Mela the son of Mela (Miller). Samuel was born in 1869 to Alika and Kanuha Miller of Oahu, Hawaiian Islands. The Great Mahele record lists Alika Mela as a landed, Konohiki of Kamehameha III. Samuel married Daisy in 1903. The couple resided in the valley of Kalihi and had 12 children, while Samuel worked as a painter. Daisy Amoe was the daughter of Namakalele and her husband Ai. Due to Kilinahe's death before adjudication, his widow and children were listed with seven other parties as Kanaina's closest living relatives.

=== Explosion at Kaiapoepoe residence ===
In the early morning of 1902 at approximately 6 am, a deadly explosion occurred at the residence of the Kaiapoepoe family. The small, four room cottage, raised off the ground by four feet was located on the Waikiki side of Kamehameha IV Road, about a half mile from King Street. Samuel Kalimahana was the first on the scene, having been awakened by the blast which was only 40 yards from his own home in Kalihi. The explosion killed and injured several people and destroyed the home belonging to S. Kaiapoepoe, who was not there at the time. A mishandling of sticks of powder ignited an explosion that killed the handler and possibly another. Sam Kaiapoepoe was Namakalele's brother, also listed as heir to Kilinahe (K) and His Highness, Charles Kanaina. He is the uncle of Daisy Amoe, Namakalele's daughter.

Kaiapoepoe's's wife, Kahana was injured and the couples's son, Kalehua received fatal injuries in the blast at the age of twenty. The explosion occurred when Kekaha, a relative of Kaiapoepoe was carrying the black powder sticks outside while smoking. Kehaka had worked at the government quarry, but is believed to have had the explosives for work with the Roads Department. Kaiapoepoe, himself had left the home two days before over a domestic dispute. While the blast was felt throughout the Kalihi district, it was not evident what the cause was to many as the home was blocked from view of the main road by trees, which may also have served to keep debris from spreading far.

When Samuel came out of his family residence, he saw the cloud of smoke still rising from the Kaiapoepoe residence and at first believed there had been a fire. He heard the sound of one of the victims calling for help, pinned under the collapsed timbers in what was left of his room. When Samuel reached the children he asked what had happened to their father, Kehaka but they had only thought that the man had fled the home. With the help of a neighbor, Samuel found partial remains in the front yard. All of the injured were taken to Queens Hospital where they were assessed as having no life-threatening injuries, except for that of Kaiapoepoe's son, Kalehua. Sam Kaiapoepoe died, December 10, 1912.

== Ancestry ==
Kilinahe was Moana Wahine's great grandson through his natural mother, Maunakapu. The Moana Wahine descendants were of the kaukau aliʻi status and served the ruling elite. By the time of Captain Cooks visit, Kaniana nui was among the chiefs who first greeted and assisted the English upon their arrival. Much of what the kaukau aliʻi achieved and gained, were from their association and marriage into the Kamehameha family.

=== Family Tree ===
Family Tree

Kalaipuwaa	Kaleimanokahoʻowaha
Paihewa	Maunakapu
Kilinahe (k) _{(1802- August 11, 1878)}	Wahineole (w)	Luika (w)	Lama (w)
Puahi	Helelani	Keoana	Keaka	Kaiapoepoe	Kahana	Ai (k)	Ahkau (k)	Namakalele	Namilimili	Kahihikua
Samuel Kalimahana Miller	Daisy Amoe
