= Keola Beamer =

Hawaiian slack-key guitar player and composer (b. 1951)

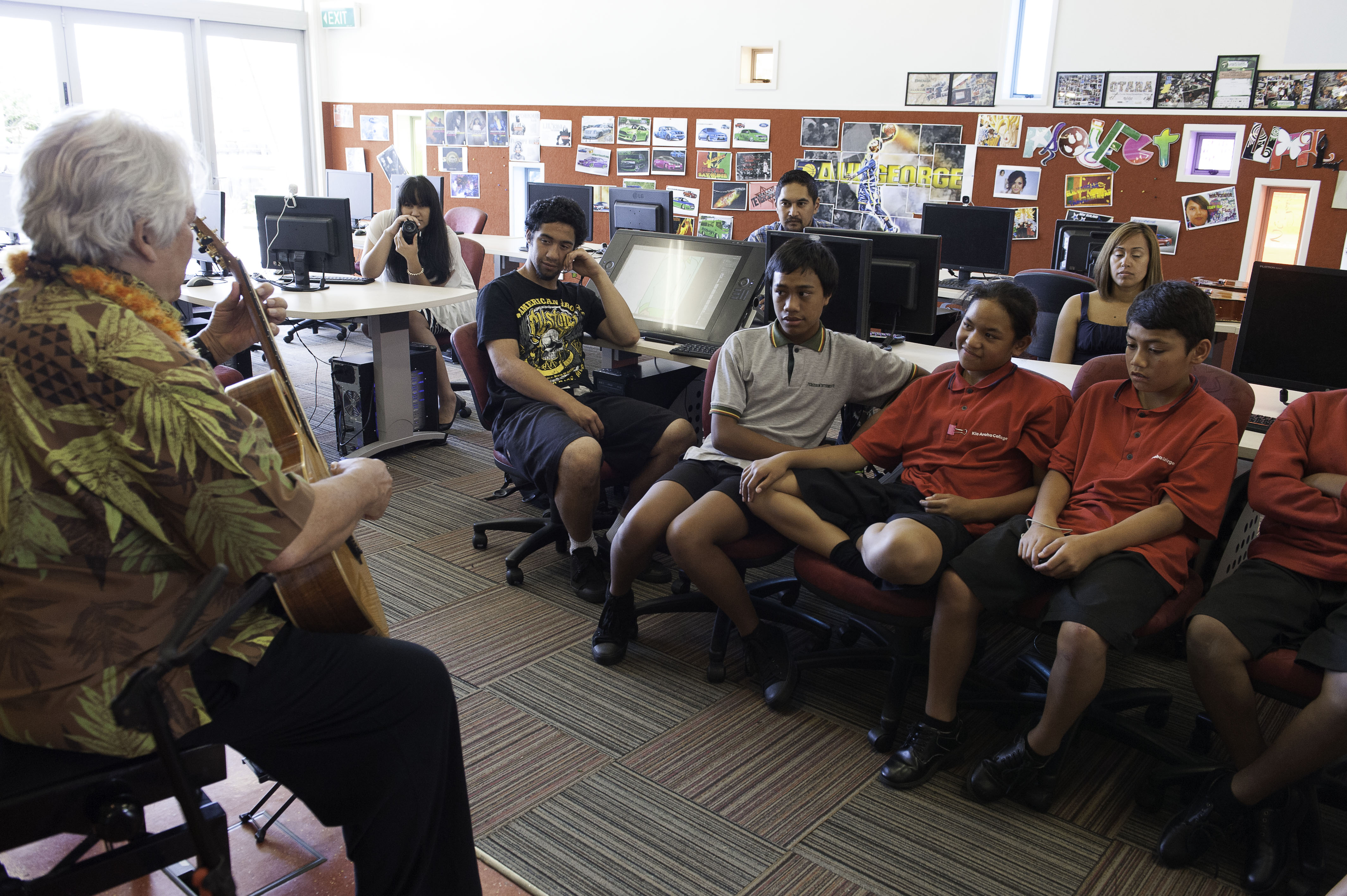
Beamer performing in 2014

Keola Beamer (born Keolamaikalani Breckenridge Beamer; February 18, 1951) is a Hawaiian slack-key guitar player, best known as the composer of "Honolulu City Lights" and an innovative musician who fused Hawaiian roots and contemporary music. Keola Beamer descends from one of Hawaii's most respected musical families.

== Family ==
Keola was born in Hawaii on February 18, 1951. His mother, Winona Beamer ("Auntie Nona"), was one of the most important figures in the revival of Hawaiian culture. She was a composer, dancer, and educator. His ancestors were musicians for the previous five generations. He can trace his roots to the House of Kamehameha and Ahiakumai, 15th-century rulers of Hawaii. His great-grandmother was Helen Desha Beamer, an influential songwriter and hula dancer. His father is Odell Steppe. Beamer is also a cancer survivor.

== Career ==
Beamer's career began in the early 1970s. His debut recording in 1972 was headlined "Jack de Mello presents Keola Beamer" and titled "Hawaiian Slack Key Guitar in the Real Old Style", followed in the same year by an album with his brother Kapono in 1972. This second album was headlined "Jack de Mello presents Keola and Kapono Beamer" and titled "This Is Our Island Home - We Are Her Sons," and subtitled "Hawaiian Slack Key Guitar in the Real Old Style". The album featured traditional songs and songs composed by Keola, Kapono, and Winona. Keola and Kapono performed as a duo, mixing traditional materials and styles with mainland pop influences. In their seven albums over the next decade, they played an important part in establishing the style that came to be called "Hawaiian contemporary," rooted in Hawaiian language and tradition but open to influences from elsewhere, incorporating rock, pop, Latin, folk-revival singer-songwriter, Hollywood soundtrack, and more. Their '1978 LP Honolulu City Lights title song was a popular single in Hawaii, and in 2004, Honolulu Magazine placed the album first on a list of the fifty most important Hawaiian albums. In the 1980s, the brothers separated professionally, each producing award-winning records. After several pop-oriented albums, Keola connected with George Winston's Dancing Cat recording project for five releases between 1994 and 2002, emphasizing slack key guitar and Hawaiian lyrics, without abandoning "contemporary" influences.

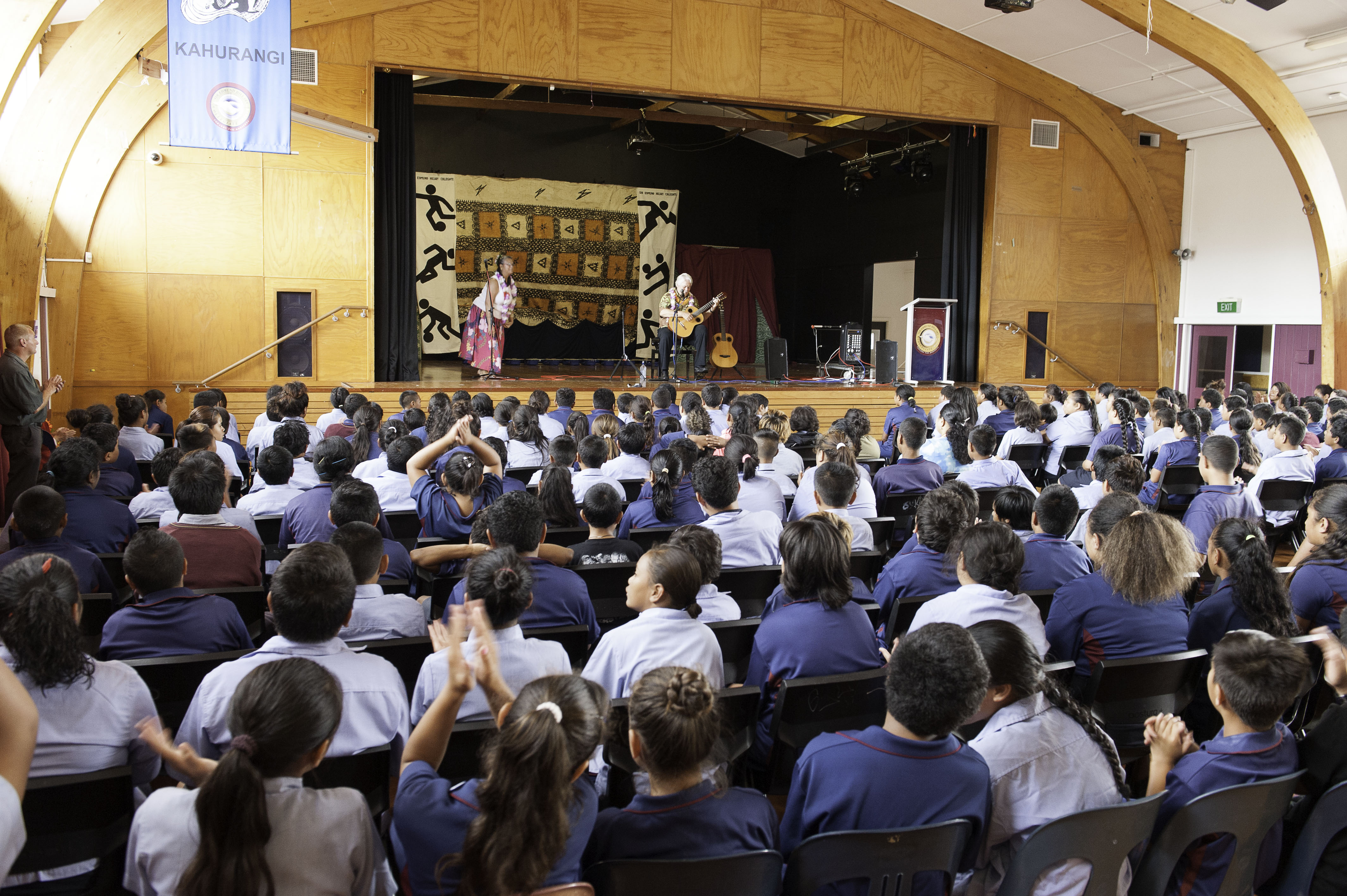
Keola and Moana Beamer

Beamer is influential as a teacher. He started offering lessons in the early 1970s, when most players would only play for family members. In 1972, Keola and Kapono provided slack key guitar lessons at the Guitar and Lute Workshop, a custom guitar manufacturer and recording studio located near Ala Moana Shopping Center on Piikoi Street. "In my early twenties, I was making guitars with George Gilmore and Donald Marienthal. We had the wild idea we could make nice guitars out of koa and mango wood, so we took out a loan from the Small Business Administration and started the Guitar and Lute Workshop on Waimanu Street in Honolulu. People started coming in to ask about the slack key. There were few teachers back then, so I agreed to try it." Keola published an instruction manual entitled "Hawaiian Slack Key". Teaching became his occupation for several years until he turned to full-time performing and composing.

In 1973, he published First Method for the Hawaiian Slack Key Guitar (the first instruction book for the form), and in the 1990s, he produced several more instruction books and videos and started offering lessons online via his website. Since 2001, he has run a series of "cultural immersion" workshops dedicated not only to slack key but also to other aspects of Hawaiiana. Meanwhile, he has continued to tour and release CDs on his own 'Ohe Records label. In 2014, he was honored with an NACF Artist Fellowship for Music. He lives in Lahaina, Hawaii.

Beamer was nominated for a Grammy Award in 2012 under the Best Regional Roots Music Album category, which includes Hawaiian music. The same year, the musical soundtrack for the motion picture movie The Descendants was nominated for the Grammy Awards. Beamer played on and contributed to the work.

Beamer has influenced many guitar players.

== Discography ==
- Keola Beamer & Raiatea (2013)
- Malama Ko Aloha (Keep Your Love) (2012)
- Kahikina O Ka Hau (The Coming of the Snow) (2011)
- Keola Beamer & Raiatea (2010)
- Our Beloved Land (with R. Carlos Nakai) (2005)
- Ki Ho'alu (Loosen the Key) DVD (2003)
- Mohala Hou - Music of the Hawaiian Renaissance (2003)
- Ka Leo O Loko - Soliloquy (2002)
- Island Born (2001)
- Kolohane - From the Gentle Wind (1999)
- Mauna Kea - White Mountain Journal (1997)
- The Golden Lehua Tree (narrated by Nona Beamer) (1996)
- Moe'uhane Kika - Tales from the Dream Guitar (1995)
- Wooden Boat (1994)
- Sweet Maui Moon (1989)
- Honolulu City Lights (1978)
- Keola and Kapono Beamer (1976)
- Hawaiian Slack Key Guitar in the Real Old Style (1972)
