= Ala wai =

Ala Wai may refer to:

- Ala Wai Canal, adjacent to Waikiki, Honolulu, Hawaii
- Ala Wai Harbor, boat and yacht harbor at the mouth of the canal in Waikiki, Honolulu, Hawaii
- Ala Wai Promenade, a linear park and bicycle path in Honolulu, Hawaii
