= Hawaii Convention Center =

Convention and exhibition center in Hawaii

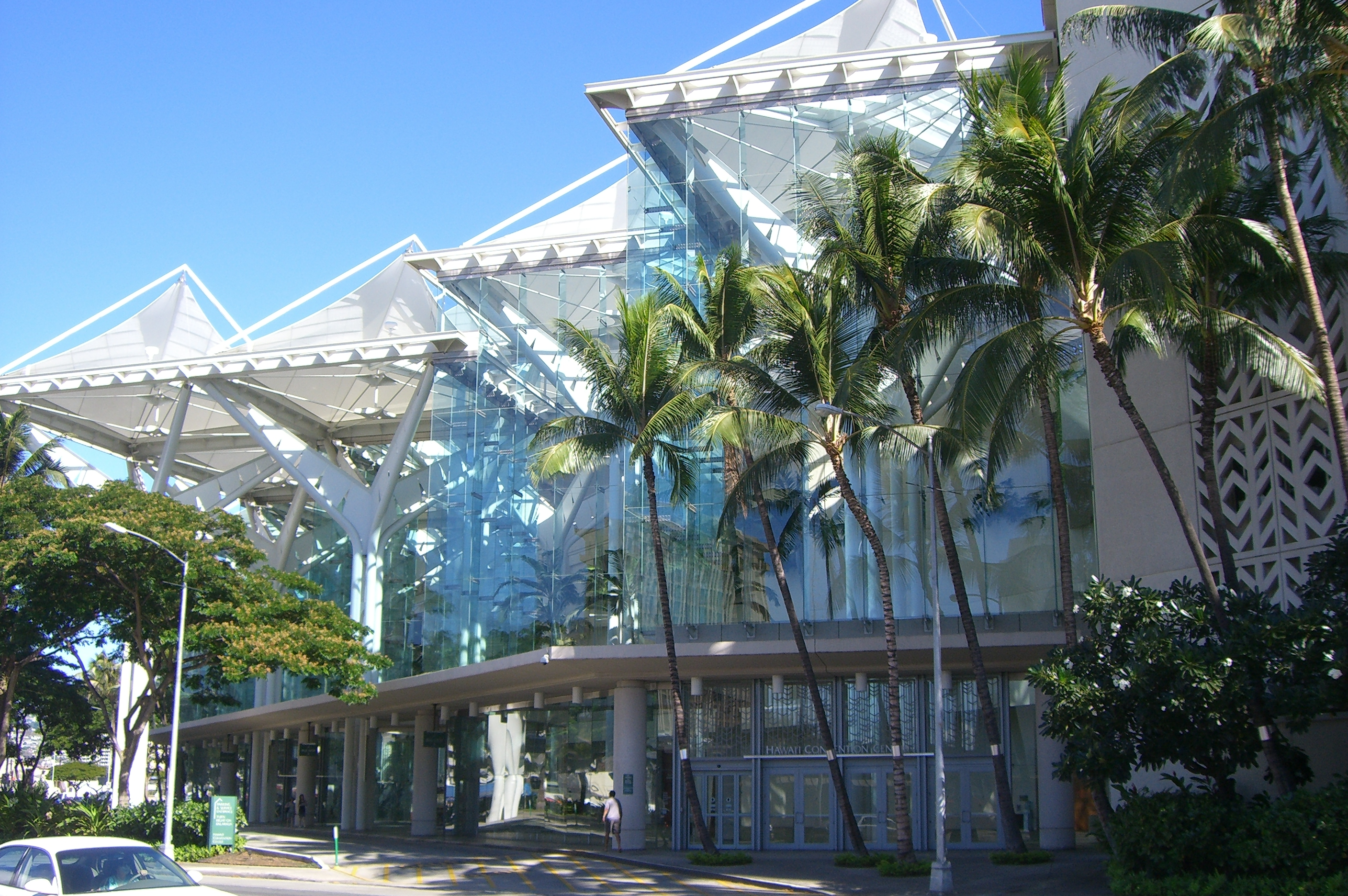
- Interactive map of Hawaii Convention Center
- Address: 1801 Kalakaua Avenue
- Location: Honolulu, Hawaii
- Coordinates: 21.2904°N 157.8357°W
- Owner: State of Hawaii
- Operator: AEG

Construction
- Opened: 1998
- Cost: $200 million

Website
- www.hawaiiconvention.com

The Hawai‘i Convention Center is a convention and exhibition center in Hawaii, located in Honolulu on the island of Oahu. The Hawaii Convention Center is the largest exhibition center of its type in the state. It is located directly to the west of the Waikiki district of Honolulu, and near the Ala Wai Promenade.

== Design and construction ==
Construction of the building cost $200 million. The building offers 1,100,000 square feet (100,000 m^{2}) of ballroom and exhibition floor space. It was completed in 1997 and opened in 1998. The Hawaii Convention Center is owned by the Hawaii Tourism Authority and managed by Los Angeles based company AEG Live.

The Hawaiʻi Convention Center was the largest "design-build" project undertaken by the State of Hawaiʻi. The bid process for the design began in 1994 with LMN Architects being chosen to design the building. Wimberly Allison Tong & Goo was chosen to design the interior, incorporating historical Hawaiian quilt designs and nature based motifs throughout.

== Events ==
Major events that take place at the Hawaii Convention Center include the annual First Hawaiian International Auto Show, the Miss Hawaii competition, the Honolulu Festival, Kawaii Kon and numerous other public and private events. On November 12–20, 2011, the Hawaii Convention Center hosted the culminating meetings of APEC United States 2011. An estimated 10,000 people arrived in Honolulu for the meetings.

The National Transportation Safety Board public hearing on the Korean Air Flight 801 crash in Guam was held at the Hawaii Convention Center on March 24–26, 1998, in Ballrooms A, B, and C.

November 2, 2024 Game Changer Wrestling held a live pay-per-view show at the Convention Center titled HawaiiMania.

=== Sporting events ===
The convention center offers 28 volleyball and badminton courts, 18 basketball courts and 11 futsal (indoor soccer) courts for sports competitions.

The 2024 Pokémon World Championships were held at the Convention Center between August 16-18. It was the third video game World Championships held in Hawaii after 2010 and 2012 were held in Waikoloa Village, Hawaii.

== Awards ==
The center has won the Prime Site Award for twelve-year consecutive years. In 2010, it won an Inner Circle Award in the category of "Top Convention Centers". The Center won a "Best in Business Travel" award in the category of "Best Conference or Convention Center/City" The International Association of Exhibitions and Events (IAEE) voted the Hawai‘i Convention Center as the most beautiful convention center in the world.

== In popular culture ==
In the television show Lost, the convention center was used to portray Sydney Airport in multiple instances. It was also featured in an episode of the new Hawaii Five-0 as hosting a fictional convention similar to San Diego Comic-Con.

It was also used as the Hilton Hotel Lobby and Monorail Station in Jurassic World (2015).
