= Ala Wai Promenade =

Park in Honolulu, Hawaii, US

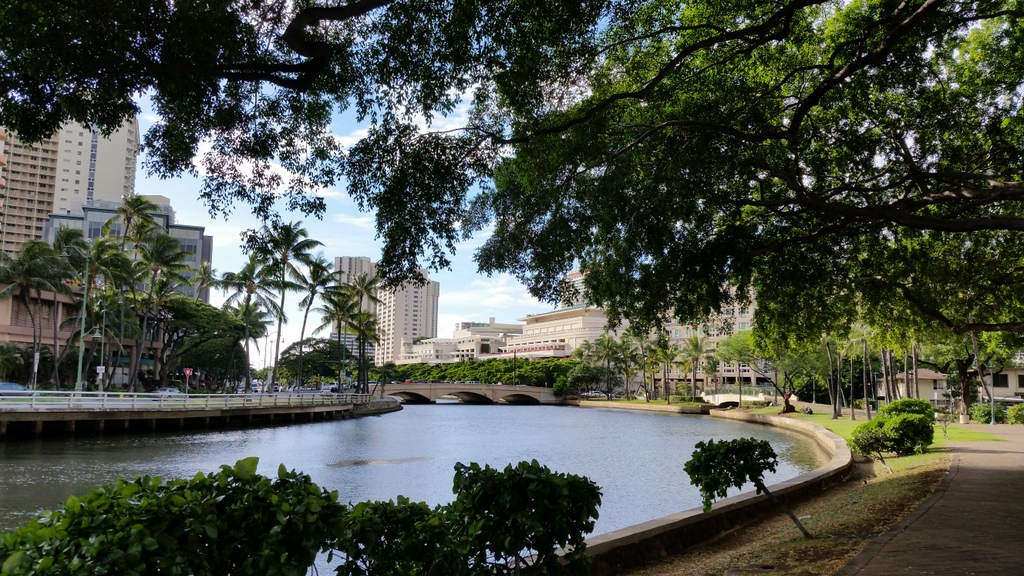
- Ala Wai Promenade, looking east toward McCully Street
- Location within Honolulu
- Type: Urban linear park
- Location: Honolulu, Hawaii, United States
- Coordinates: 21.2888116°N 157.8365632°W
- Area: Approx. 0.5 miles long
- Created: 1990s (formal development)
- Operator: City and County of Honolulu
- Status: Open year-round

The Ala Wai Promenade is a landscaped, multi-use linear pedestrian park and bikeway running along the northern bank of the Ala Wai Canal in Honolulu, Hawaii. Adjacent to Waikīkī and the Hawaii Convention Center, the promenade is notable for its double row of historic banyan trees, custom hardscape design, and role in Honolulu’s pedestrian and bicycle infrastructure. It serves as both a recreational greenway and a gathering space for community events.

== History ==
The promenade traces its origins to the development of the Ala Wai Canal in the 1920s, which was constructed to drain the wetlands of Waikīkī and enable urban expansion. In the decades following, civic groups such as the Outdoor Circle planted trees along the canal to beautify the area. The iconic banyan trees that define the promenade’s landscape today were planted in this era.

Public interest in the area emerged as early as the 1950s and 1960s, when the city began considering formalizing the canal-side land into a continuous pedestrian promenade. Community groups and planning boards expressed strong support for the effort, emphasizing the area's recreational and scenic potential.

Despite local enthusiasm, the promenade faced periodic neglect and underinvestment through the 1980s and 1990s. Reports at the time noted deteriorating conditions and insufficient maintenance. Additional media coverage during the 1990s emphasized calls for city accountability and improvements to the promenade’s deteriorating conditions.

In the 1990s, the City and County of Honolulu undertook a multi-phase project to formalize the promenade as a pedestrian and bicycle corridor. The first major phase coincided with the construction of the Hawaii Convention Center, completed in 1998. Landscape architecture firm Walters, Kimura, Motoda (WKM) designed a 16-foot-wide terraced walkway using interlocking pavers, integrated with lighting, benches, bike racks, and a grand stair linking the Convention Center to the canal.

== Design and features ==
The promenade features a linear layout along the Ala Wai Canal, running approximately from Ala Moana Boulevard near the Ala Moana Hotel to the McCully Street bridge. The park is shaded by mature banyan trees on both sides of the path, creating a tunnel-like canopy over portions of the walkway. Hardscape elements reflect traditional Hawaiian motifs, and the site incorporates sustainable materials such as recycled plastic benches.

The promenade provides continuous access for pedestrians and cyclists, functioning as part of Honolulu’s broader multi-use trail and green infrastructure system. Its location near key destinations such as Waikīkī, Ala Moana Center, and various residential areas makes it a valuable connector for non-motorized mobility.

The promenade is used daily by walkers, joggers, and cyclists, and also serves as a venue for cultural and civic events.

== Environmental context ==
The Ala Wai Promenade borders the Ala Wai Canal, a man-made waterway historically used to manage drainage for the surrounding urban area. Over time, the canal has become one of the most polluted waterways in Hawaii due to sediment, runoff, and limited water circulation. Various public and academic initiatives have examined the canal's ecological health and proposed restoration strategies.

The promenade lies within the larger Ala Wai Watershed, and environmental planning for the region frequently includes considerations for green infrastructure, climate resilience, and improved stormwater management.
