= Ala Wai Canal =

Canal in Honolulu, Hawaii, U.S.

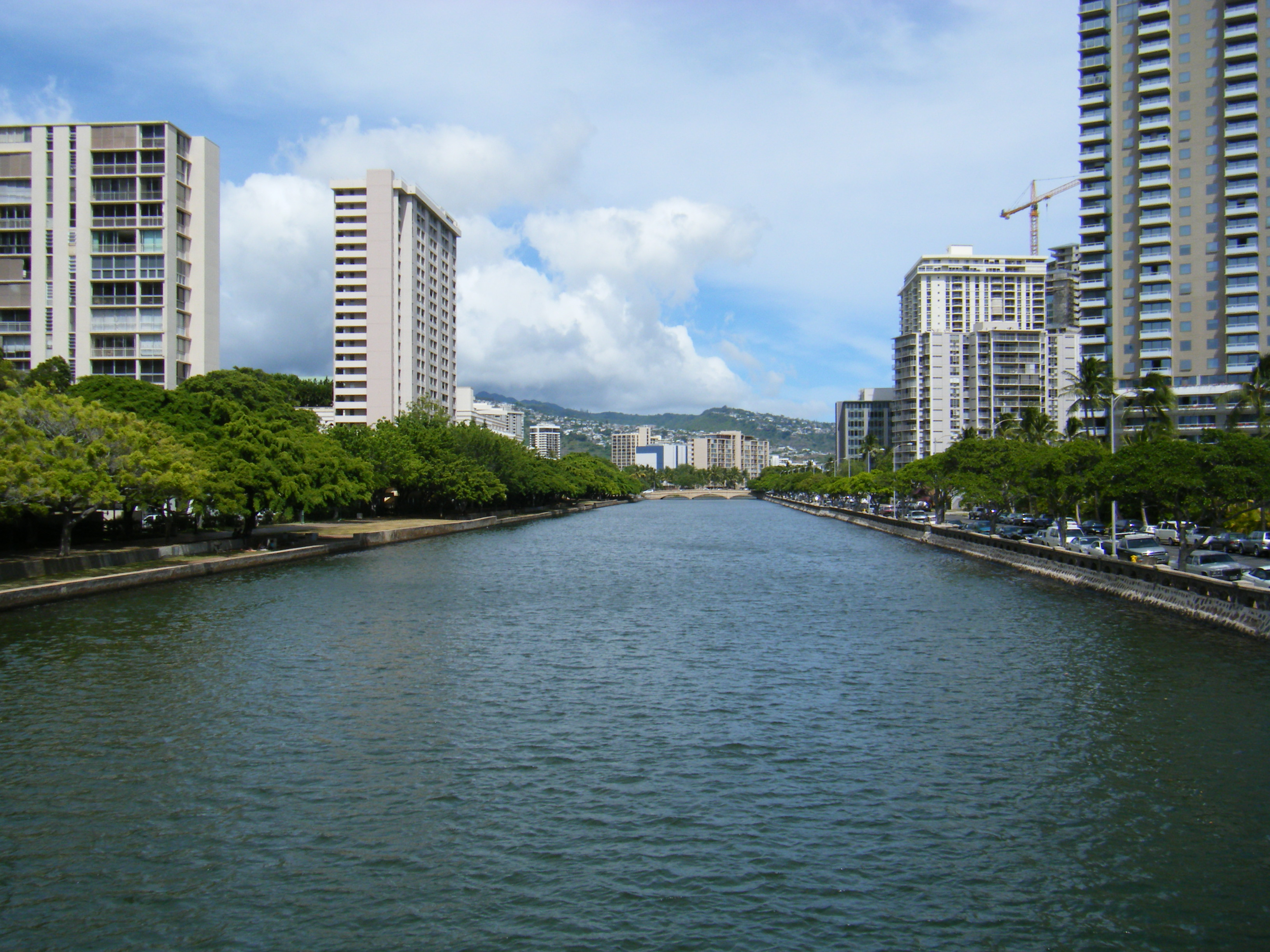
- Ala Wai Canal
- Interactive map of Ala Wai Canal
- Coordinates: 21°17′14″N 157°49′52″W

Specifications
- Length: 1.5 miles (2.4 km)
- Status: Open

History
- Construction began: 1921
- Date completed: 1928

Geography
- Start point: Manoa and Palolo Streams (tributary)
- End point: Ala Wai Harbor, Pacific Ocean

The Ala Wai Canal is an artificial waterway in Honolulu, Hawaii which serves as the northern boundary of the tourist district of Waikiki. It was created in 1928 to drain the rice paddies and swamps which would eventually become Waikiki. It also serves as a primary drainage corridor for the rivers and streams that run through central and east Honolulu.

The canal runs from just northwest of Kapahulu Avenue along the length of Waikiki, then turns southwest to empty into the Pacific Ocean. Bridges cross the canal at McCully Street, Kalākaua Avenue, and Ala Moana Boulevard. Ala Wai Boulevard runs parallel to the west side of the canal in Waikiki. The Canal is bordered on the northwest by the Ala Wai Promenade.

== History ==
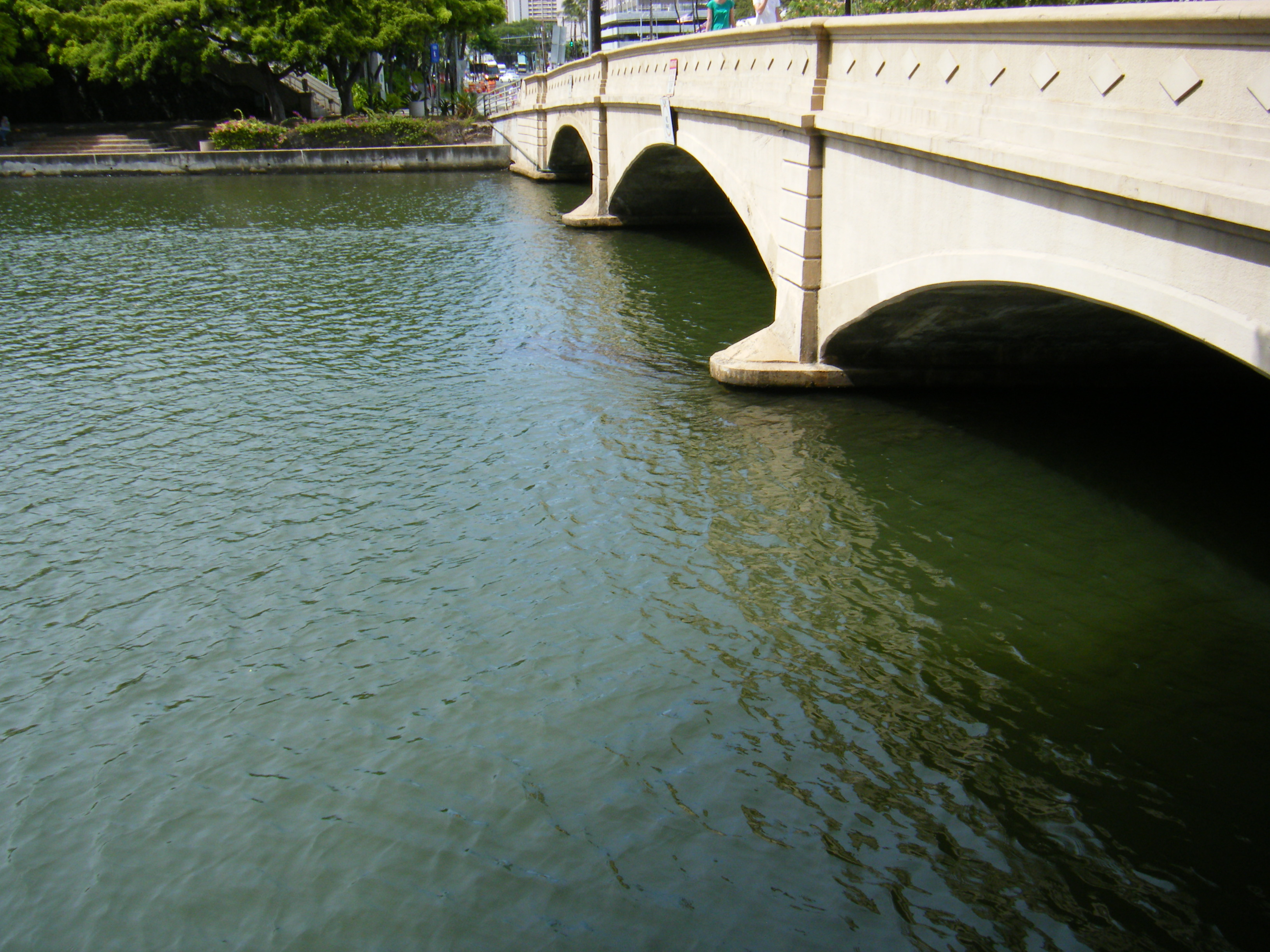
Kalākaua Avenue bridge over the Ala Wai

Before the canal existed, Waikiki consisted of wetlands which were fed by streams running from the Makiki, Palolo, and Manoa valleys to the sea. In the early 1900s, Lucius Pinkham, then President of the Territorial Board of Health, proposed to construct a drainage canal to drain the wetlands, which he considered "unsanitary." Although the canal proposal was approved by the Board of Health, final approval did not occur until Pinkham became Governor of Hawaii.

Construction of the canal by Walter F. Dillingham's Hawaiian Dredging Construction Company, began in 1921 and was completed in 1928. When the city was issuing permits for new buildings in Waikiki they required builders to build above sea level. Dillingham sold the spoil he had dredged in creating the canal so builders could increase the elevation of the newly created land. The canal is routinely dredged to this day.

The creation of the canal shunted the flow of the streams directly into the ocean, which resulted in the creation of several square miles of new real estate. Among those who benefited from the development were people who, though of modest means, had obtained and maintained small rice and bean farms. The reclamation of these lands were considered pivotal in the eventual development of Waikiki as a tourist center. The linear park along the canal, Ala Wai Promenade, was also built.

As originally designed, the canal's two-mile long waterway had two outlets, one on either end, which allowed sediment to be flushed into the ocean. Engineers decided not to build the eastern outlet, near Kapiolani Park and the Waikiki Natatorium when they determined that contamination from that end would be deposited on the beach at Waikiki.

Subsequent to its creation, people have enjoyed fishing from the banks of the canal.

== Major concerns ==
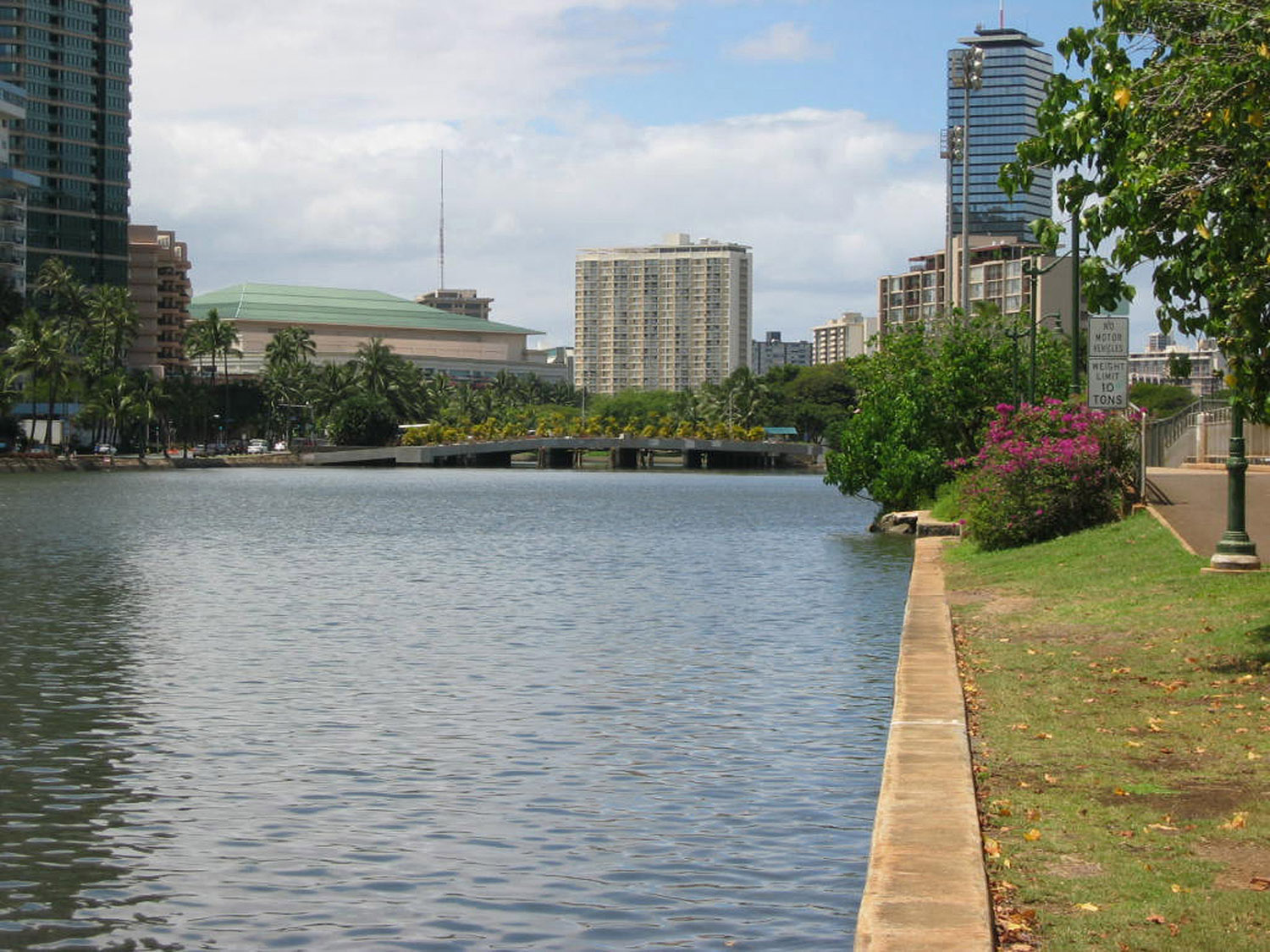
The bank of the Ala Wai

Federal flood experts have claimed heavy rain could cause the canal to overflow, potentially inundating the area from Diamond Head to Ala Moana and Moiliili with up to five feet of water. To prevent such a disaster, the U.S. Army Corps of Engineers has examined various measures, including digging a deeper channel, widening the McCully bridge, and adding walls along the canal.

Another major issue is the pollution in the canal brought about by urbanization. In addition to runoff from streets and growing neighborhoods, mercury was detected in the canal. The mercury was attributed to the boat paint used in the Ala Wai Harbor. A 1976 Department of Health report also said that canal water regularly violated federal limits on fecal coliform counts, an indicator of high bacteria levels.

The canal has been dredged at least three times, in 1967, 1978 and 2002. Most of the dredged sediment was deposited in the ocean, except for some sediment from the 2002 dredging, which was deemed too toxic and instead used for landfill at Honolulu International Airport.

In March 2006, heavy thunderstorms and rains caused a pressurized sewage line near Ala Wai Canal to break. Days later, and after the spill was made public, then-Mayor Mufi Hannemann decided to divert nearly 48 million US gallons (180,000 m^{3}) of untreated sewage into the canal in an attempt to avoid having the sewage back up into hotels and residences. This diversion caused partial overflowing, and the sewage then tainted Waikiki and nearby beaches. The beaches near the Ala Wai Canal, including beaches in the Waikiki and Ala Moana districts were closed temporarily due to health concerns. In the weeks after the incident, beaches were eventually reopened, but it took several months before the Ala Wai Canal was determined to be safe and free from major health concerns. One person died from septic shock after falling into the Ala Wai Harbor near the mouth of the canal, with his death being attributed by some to the higher levels of bacteria present after the flood.

Despite the canal repeatedly falling short of meeting safety standards for paddling and recreational use, there has been no move to prohibit such use. Hundreds of paddlers and boaters make it one of the most used inland waterways in the state.

In 2022, researchers from the Department of Oceanography, University of Hawaiʻi at Mānoa, published a paper detailing the toxic levels of flesh-eating bacteria in the canal. Additionally, with the current worldwide environmental changes, the scientists' work, "suggest a 2- to 3-fold increase in average V. vulnificus density in the Ala Wai Canal by 2100".

The Hawaiʻi Exemplary State Foundation launched the Genki Ala Wai Project in 2019. It aims to make the infamous canal swimmable and fishable again, initially by 2026. Genki balls consist of soil, rice bran, and water. They are paired with Effective Microorganisms bioremediation technology to restore the canal. The genki balls digest and oxygenate the sludge at the bottom of the canal to clear the water. It also reduces harmful gases to eliminate the foul odor near the Ala Wai.

== Photos ==
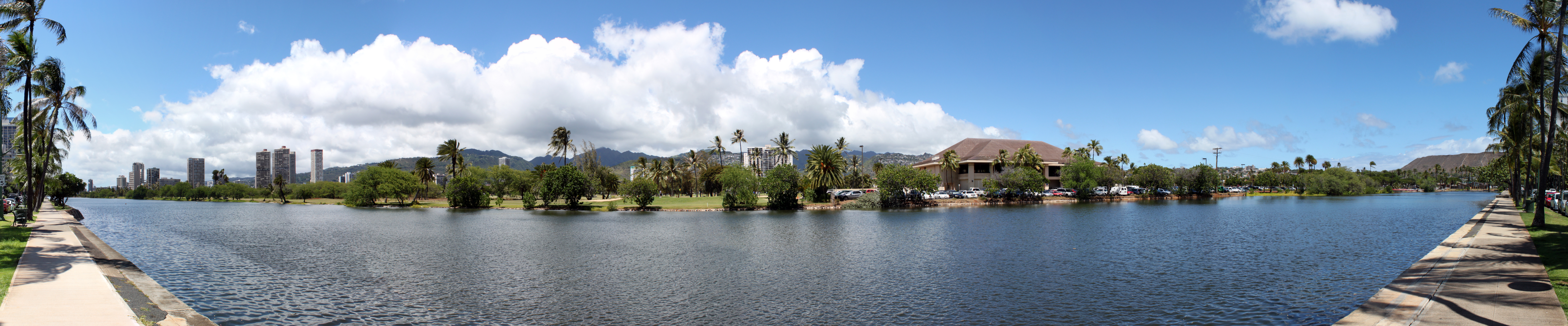
Panoramic view of the Ala Wai Canal

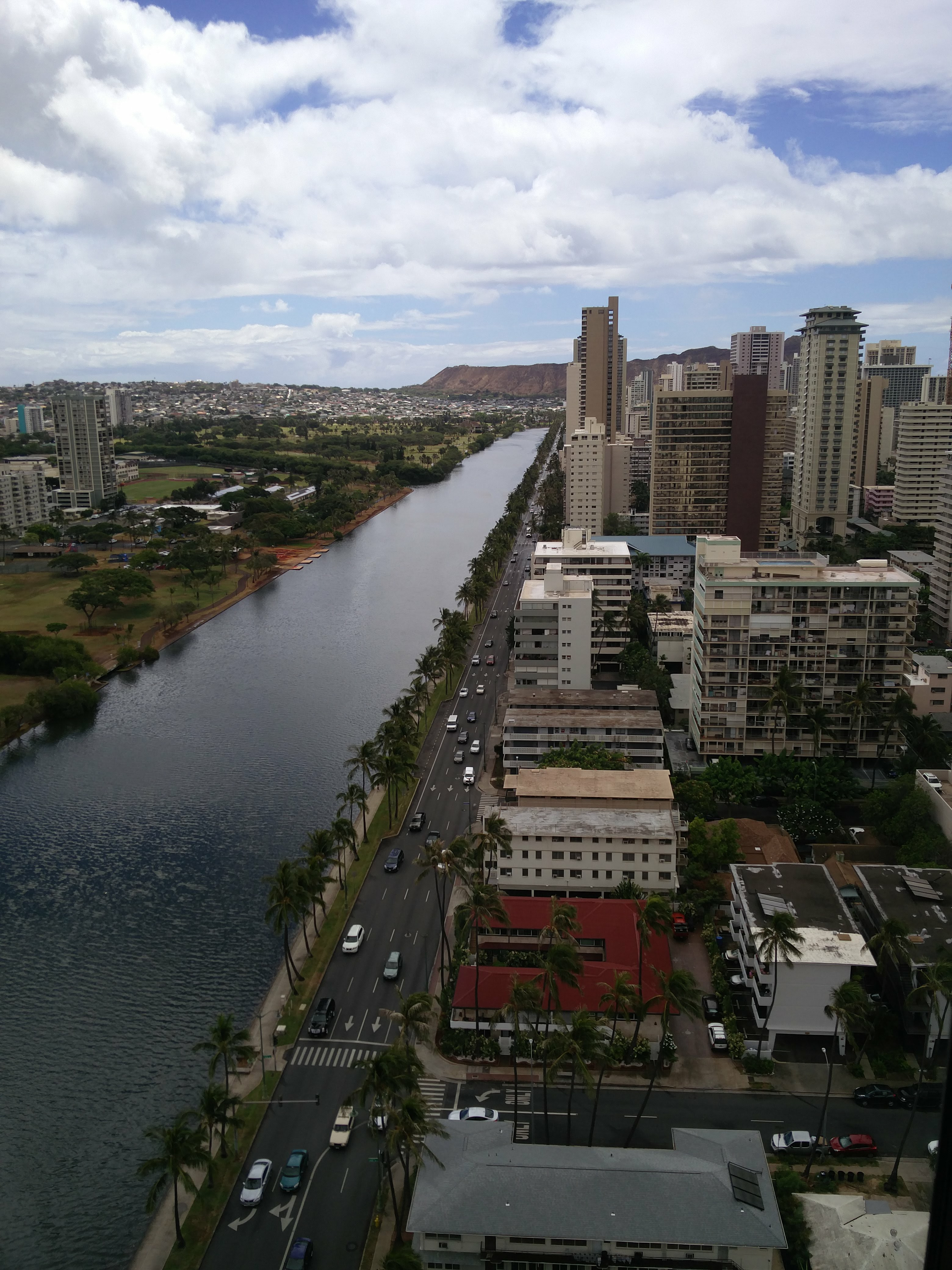
View of the Ala Wai Canal from the 29th Floor

== See also ==
- Ala Wai Harbor
- Kuhio Beach Park
