= McCully Street bridge =

Bridge in Honolulu, Hawaii

McCully Street Bridge
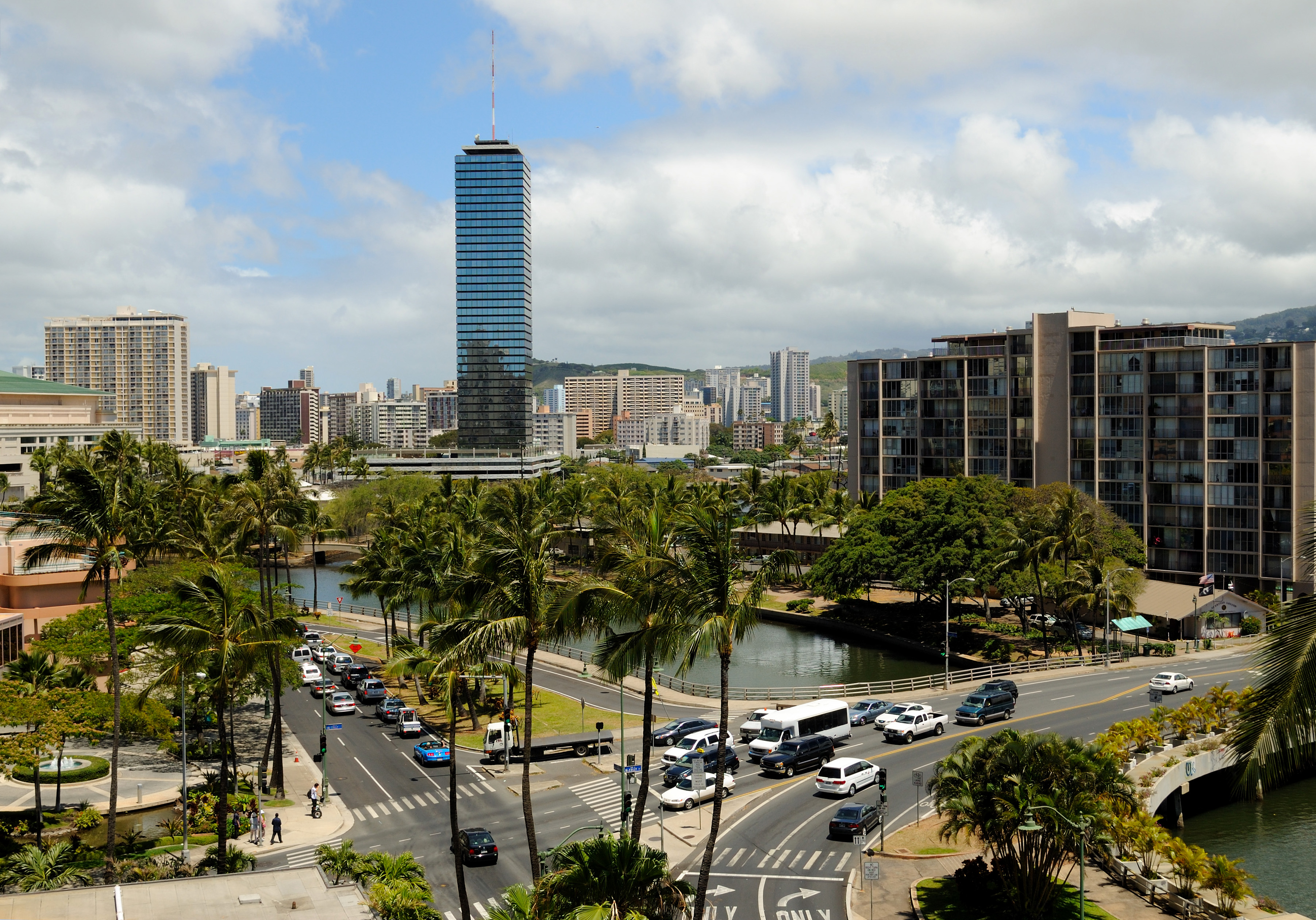
- The Ala Wai Canal and Waikiki skyline, with McCully Street Bridge at bottom right
- Coordinates: 21.2883068°N 157.8327987°W
- Carries: McCully Street (6 lanes of roadway), pedestrians and bicycles
- Crosses: Ala Wai Canal
- Locale: Honolulu, Hawaii, U.S.
- Owner: City and County of Honolulu
- Maintained by: City and County of Honolulu Department of Transportation Services
- ID number: 003083401400011

Characteristics
- Design: Reinforced concrete slab bridge (multi-span)
- Material: Reinforced concrete
- Total length: 166 ft (51 m) (approx.)
- Width: 70 ft (21 m) (roadway)
- No. of lanes: 6

History
- Opened: 1959

Statistics
- Daily traffic: ~26,500 (2015 est.)

Location
- Interactive map of McCully Street Bridge

The McCully Street Bridge is a vehicular and pedestrian bridge in Honolulu, Hawaii, that carries McCully Street across the Ala Wai Canal near the entrance of Waikiki. Opened in 1959, it is one of three primary bridges connecting Waikiki to the McCully–Mōʻiliʻili area. The bridge replaced a narrower, older structure to accommodate growing traffic demand during the late 1950s.

== History ==
The original bridge at this location was a narrow two-lane wooden structure built shortly after the dredging of the Ala Wai Canal in the 1920s. With increasing traffic into Waikiki, the old bridge was deemed inadequate by the 1950s. Plans for a new, expanded bridge were approved in 1957 by the Territorial government of Hawaii. Construction began in 1958, and the bridge opened to traffic in early 1959.

The project reused existing concrete piers from the earlier bridge. The contractor was John L. Young Construction & Engineering Company. The bridge played a role in alleviating traffic congestion into Waikiki and reflected infrastructure modernization efforts as Hawaii approached statehood.

== Design and characteristics ==
The McCully Street Bridge is a seven-span reinforced concrete slab structure. Its total length is approximately 166 feet (51 m), with a width of about 70 feet (21 m). The bridge carries six lanes of vehicular traffic and includes sidewalks on both sides for pedestrians.

The design is functional and utilitarian, representative of mid-20th-century public infrastructure.

== Renovations and improvements ==
In 2004, the City and County of Honolulu undertook structural rehabilitation of the bridge, including deck repairs and upgrades to railings and sidewalks.

In 2017, the bridge underwent further maintenance involving lane closures to address concrete spalling and minor structural repairs. Work was scheduled during off-peak hours to reduce traffic disruptions.

In 2016, the Ala Wai Complete Streets Implementation Report proposed modifications to improve pedestrian and bicycle access. Recommendations included narrowing vehicle lanes and removing the southbound right-turn slip lane onto Ala Wai Boulevard.

== See also ==
- Ala Wai Canal
- List of bridges in the United States
