= Kalākaua Avenue =

Street in Honolulu, Hawaii

Coordinates: 21.2781°N 157.8279°W

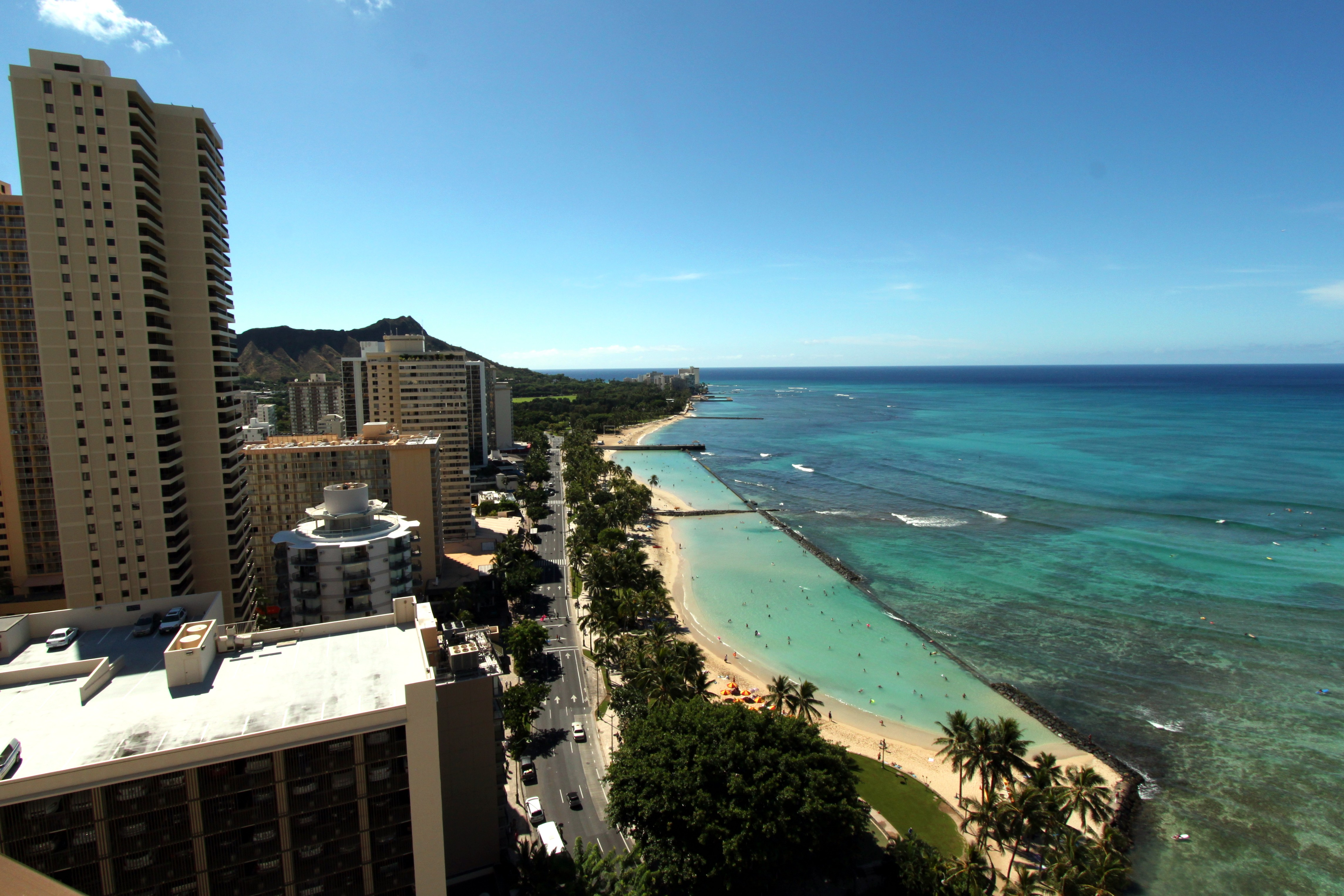
Kalākaua Avenue in Waikīkī

Kalākaua Avenue is a street in Honolulu in the US federal state of Hawaii. The street travels across the tourist Centre of Waikīkī and belongs to the prospering streets of the United States. It demonstrates an architectural fusion of Hawaiian, Gothic, Asian, Spanish and Moorish architecture.

== Route ==
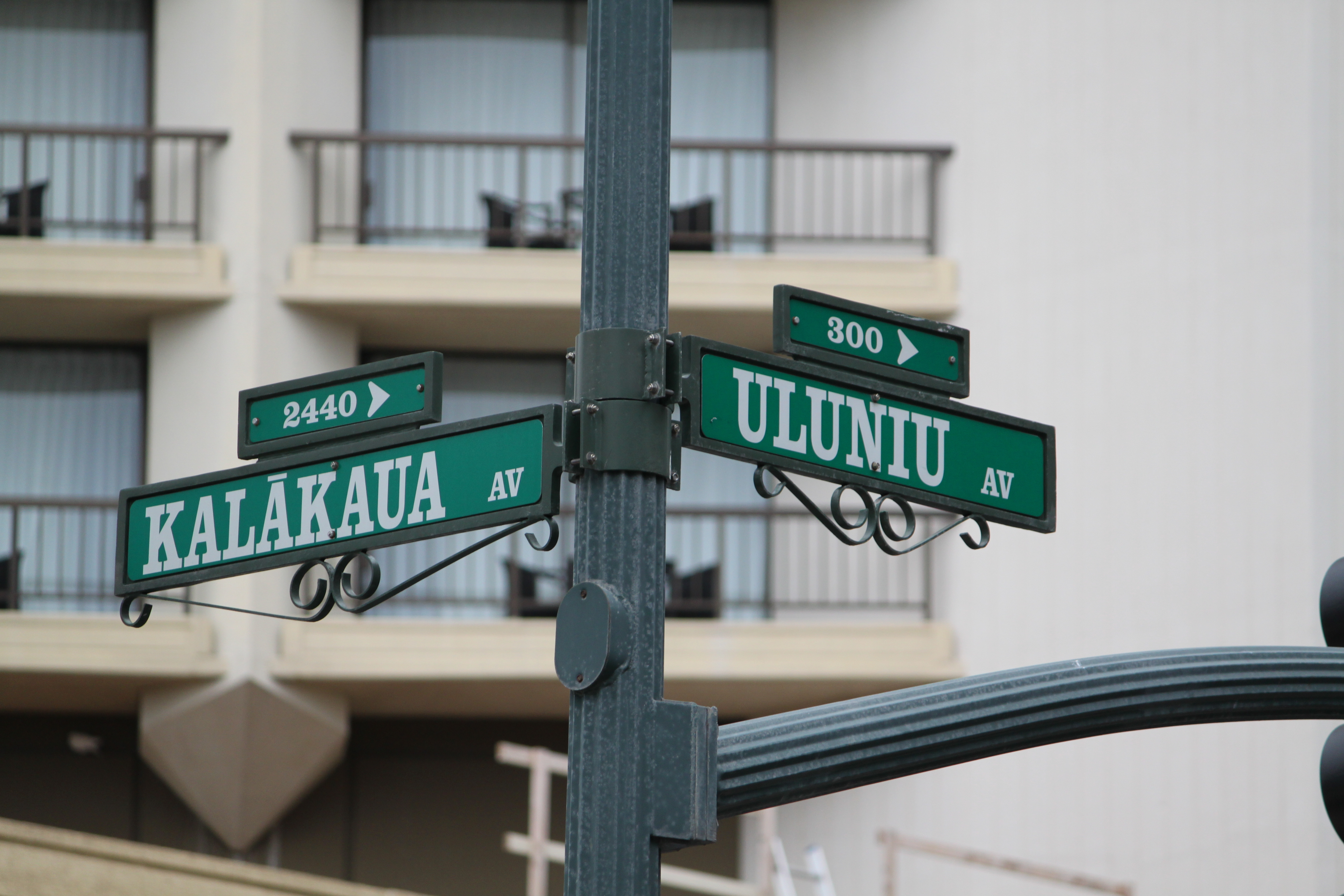
Roadsign: Kalākaua Av

The arterial road, which is 4.4 kilometers in length, starts near the Diamond Head at the Kapiolani Park, which is the oldest public park of Hawaii and continues past the Honolulu Zoo, along the beaches of Waikiki. The street passes through the business district, as well as the Ala Wai Canal and ends in McCully, just before the Interstate H-1 at South Beretania Street. It is the Kalākaua Avenue that is home to some of the most known hotels of Honolulu, such as The Royal Hawaiian Hotel, Hyatt Regency or Sheraton Waikīkī. Alongside this, there are a number of restaurants and luxury international fashion brands stores, as well as multiple shopping malls.

== History ==
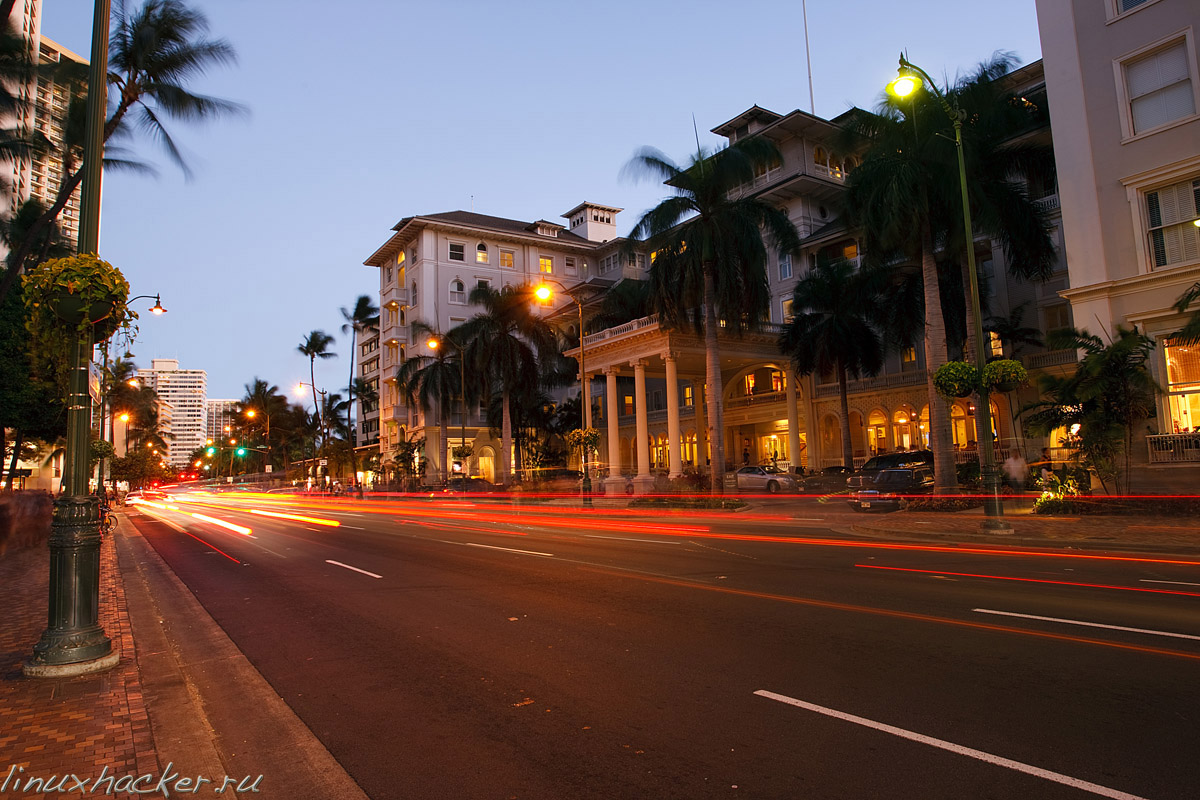
Kalākaua Avenue in the evening

The street was already the main access to Waikīkī since the 19th century. The avenue was firstly called Waikiki Road and was named after King Kalākaua, the last male monarch of the Hawaiian Kingdom in 1905. The streets' outstanding importance was only developed after the construction of the Ala Wai canal in 1928, which initiated a draining of the Wetlands that enabled the development of the land. In the late 1960s and early 1970s, the subsequent construction boom of high-rise buildings culminated in the establishment of large hotel chains. In 1974, Honolulu County, Hawaii issued new building regulations, which should limit height and compaction of the buildings. From 1994 to 2004, the city invested 100 million US-dollars into landscaping, the construction of new sidewalks, footpaths, squares, historic streetlamps and benches.

== Local public transport ==
The local public transport on this street was accomplished with carriages in 1868, then replaced by streetcars that were pulled by horses in 1888 and then electric streetcars in 1903. The rail service was discontinued in 1941 and replaced by busses. Nowadays, TheBus by Honolulu Rapid Transit Systems drives through Kalākaua Avenue with 21 stops.

== Visitors ==
According to the Hawaii Tourism Authority (tourism authority), Kalākaua Avenue is the most visited location of the state of Hawaii (as at 2022). The geolocation data from smartphones was used to determine this. The number of visitors is made up of 56% residents and 44% tourists.
