= First Hawaiian International Auto Show =

The First Hawaiian MotorCon (formerly First Hawaiian International Auto Show) is an annual auto show held every year between the middle week of March and the first week of April in Honolulu, Hawaii. The event takes place at the Hawaii Convention Center (near the Ala Moana Center), whose location site was once the location of a Chevrolet dealership, Aloha Motors. The event, affiliated with the Motor Trend regional auto show circuit since 2000, is produced by the Hawaii Automotive Dealers Association (HADA) and sponsored by First Hawaiian Bank, with the Honolulu Star-Advertiser serving as the media sponsor. The recent event, going into its 42nd year, was planned for March 27-29, 2020. Hawaii Governor David Ige announced at his press conference March 17, that he is closing the Hawaii Convention Center for 30 days to limit social contact in light of recent community spread of Covid-19 virus infections. The auto show was cancelled for 2020, but returned for February 2022.

== Event background ==
The idea to organize the auto show began in 1978, when First Hawaiian and HADA collaborated on a plan to improve FHB's relationships with dealers and build its image and business. The inaugural show that year drew 67,000 visitors and helped generate business for both the bank and the dealerships. The event, later adding the "International" name to its title in 2000, allows HADA-affiliated dealerships in the state of Hawaii and the automakers themselves to showcase the latest cars, crossovers, trucks, vans, and SUVs to Hawaiian residents, military/DOD/civilian personnel and dependents, car enthusiasts, and tourists (especially from Asia and Oceania). Most of the vehicles showcased are from the dealerships themselves, although a handful of display and concept models will directly come from the companies, which they have shipped by sea or cargo plane weeks in advance of the show because of Hawaii's geographical location. Since its inception, attendance has grown in numbers, with most of the visitors coming to see the event's popular display, the luxury vehicles, which at times have seen sales generated after the show's conclusion.

Other features at the event include displays featuring various car and motorcycle collections sponsored by local car clubs, advice and money-saving promotion booths set up by First Hawaiian Bank, Hawaiian Electric, and numerous auto-related businesses, test drives, and a showcase of Skyline, which is scheduled to start service on June 30, 2023.

== Participating automakers ==
Unless otherwise noted, the brands listed are sold by more than one dealership in Hawaii

=== Current Participants ===
- General Motors
  - Chevrolet
- Fiat Chrysler Automobiles
  - Chrysler
  - Dodge
  - Jeep
  - Ram
  - Fiat (Sponsored by The Cutter Auto Group, the state's sole Fiat dealership)
  - Ferrari (as part of JN’s Velocity Automotive banner)
  - Maserati (as part of JN’s Velocity Automotive banner)
- Ford Motor Company
  - Ford
- Volkswagen Group
  - Audi (Sponsored by JN Automotive Group)
  - Bentley (as part of JN’s Velocity Automotive banner)
  - Lamborghini (as part of JN’s Velocity Automotive banner)
  - Porsche (as part of JN’s Velocity Automotive banner)
  - Volkswagen
- Tata Motors (Sponsored by JN Automotive Group)
  - Jaguar
  - Land Rover
- Lotus Cars (as part of JN’s Velocity Automotive banner)
- BMW North America (Sponsored by Fletcher Jones Automotive Group)
  - BMW
  - Mini
- DaimlerBenz (Sponsored by Fletcher Jones Automotive Group)
  - Mercedes-Benz
- Hyundai Kia Automotive Group
  - Hyundai
  - Kia (Sponsored by Aloha Kia, the state's sole Kia dealership)
- Honda Motor Company
  - Acura
  - Honda
- Nissan Motors
  - Infiniti
  - Nissan

=== Secondary Participants ===
Brands that are shown occasionally; some brands had opted not to participate in the 2020 event, which was announced before its cancellation of the Auto Show in March 2020:

- Buick/Cadillac/GMC (note: Cadillac discontinued participating after the 2013 event; Buick and GMC was excluded in the 2014 show but returned for the 2015 show. They withdrew after the 2019 event)
- Lincoln (discontinued participation after the 2015 event; its Honolulu dealership Honolulu Ford discontinued selling the brand in 2017. Returned under a new deal with JN Autogroup in 2020 but has not announced plans to participate in future shows)
- Toyota Motor Corporation (Sponsored by Servco Automotive Group; withdrew after the 2019 event)
  - Lexus
  - Toyota
- Mazda (Sponsored by Cutter Automotive Group; withdrew after the 2019 event)
- Subaru (Sponsored by Servco Automotive Group; withdrew after the 2019 event)
- Tesla Motors (withdrew after the 2018 event)
- Volvo (Sponsored by Cutter Automotive Group; withdrew after the 2018 event)

=== Former/Inactive Participants ===
A list of brands that were withdrawn from the event:

- Harley-Davidson
- Mitsubishi
- Smart
