= Kūhiō Beach Park =

Park in Hawaii

Coordinates: 21°16′27″N 157°49′33″W

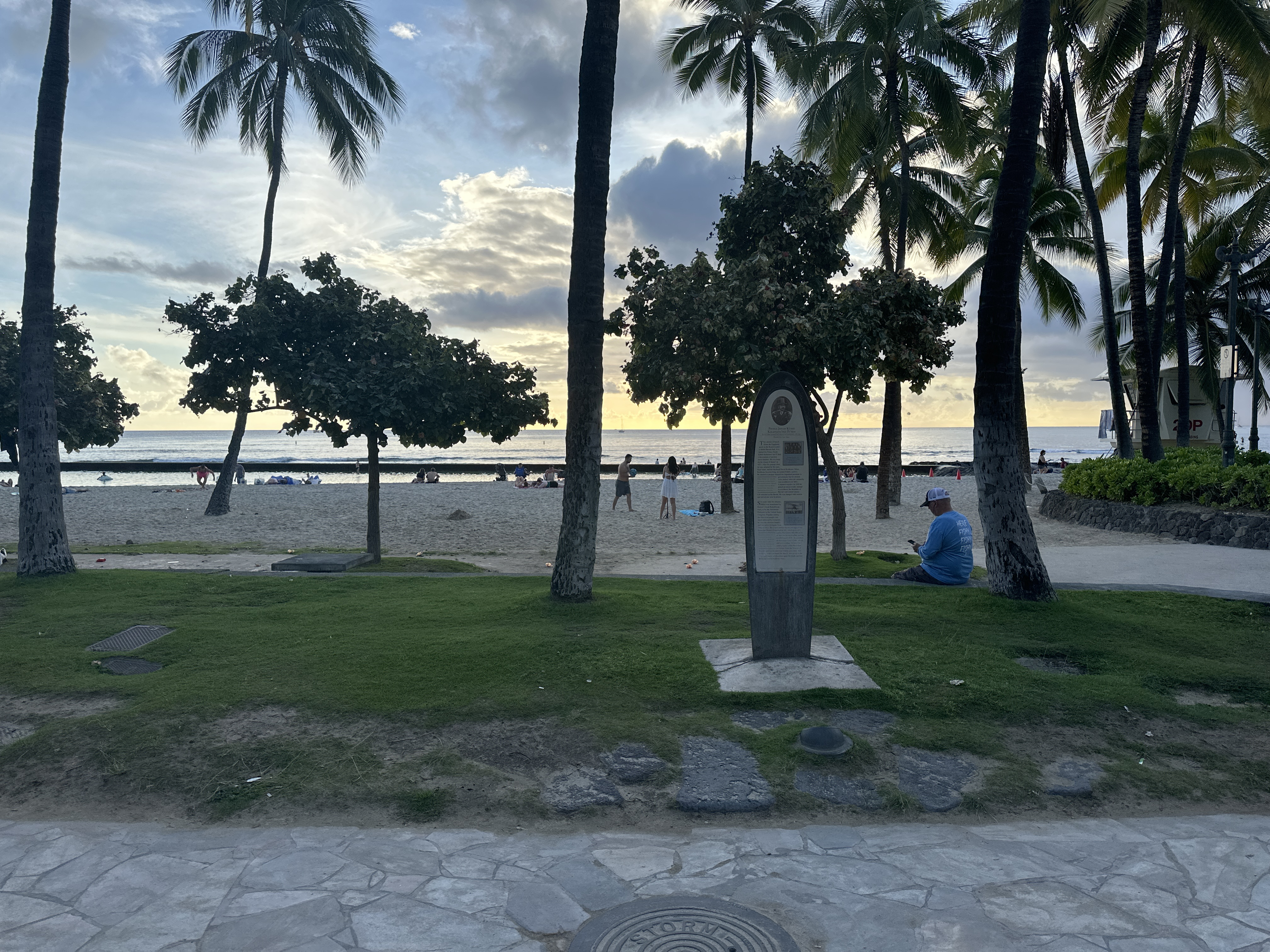
Kūhiō Beach with informational board about Jonah Kūhiō Kalanianaʻole (2022)

Kūhiō Beach Park is a public ocean-side park on the island of Oʻahu, U.S. state of Hawaii, located within the Waikīkī neighborhood. It's a common gathering place for the Honolulu population and tourists due to its location and semi-protected waters.

The park was named for Jonah Kūhiō Kalanianaʻole, the youngest son of Kekaulike Kinoiki II and High Chief David Kahalepouli Piʻikoi. The current park was the site of Pualeilani, the home of Prince Kūhiō and his wife, Princess Elizabeth Kahanu. In July 1918, the prince removed a high board fence, opening a section of the beach to the public. The property was given to the city after his death in 1922, and Kūhiō Beach Park was officially dedicated in 1940.

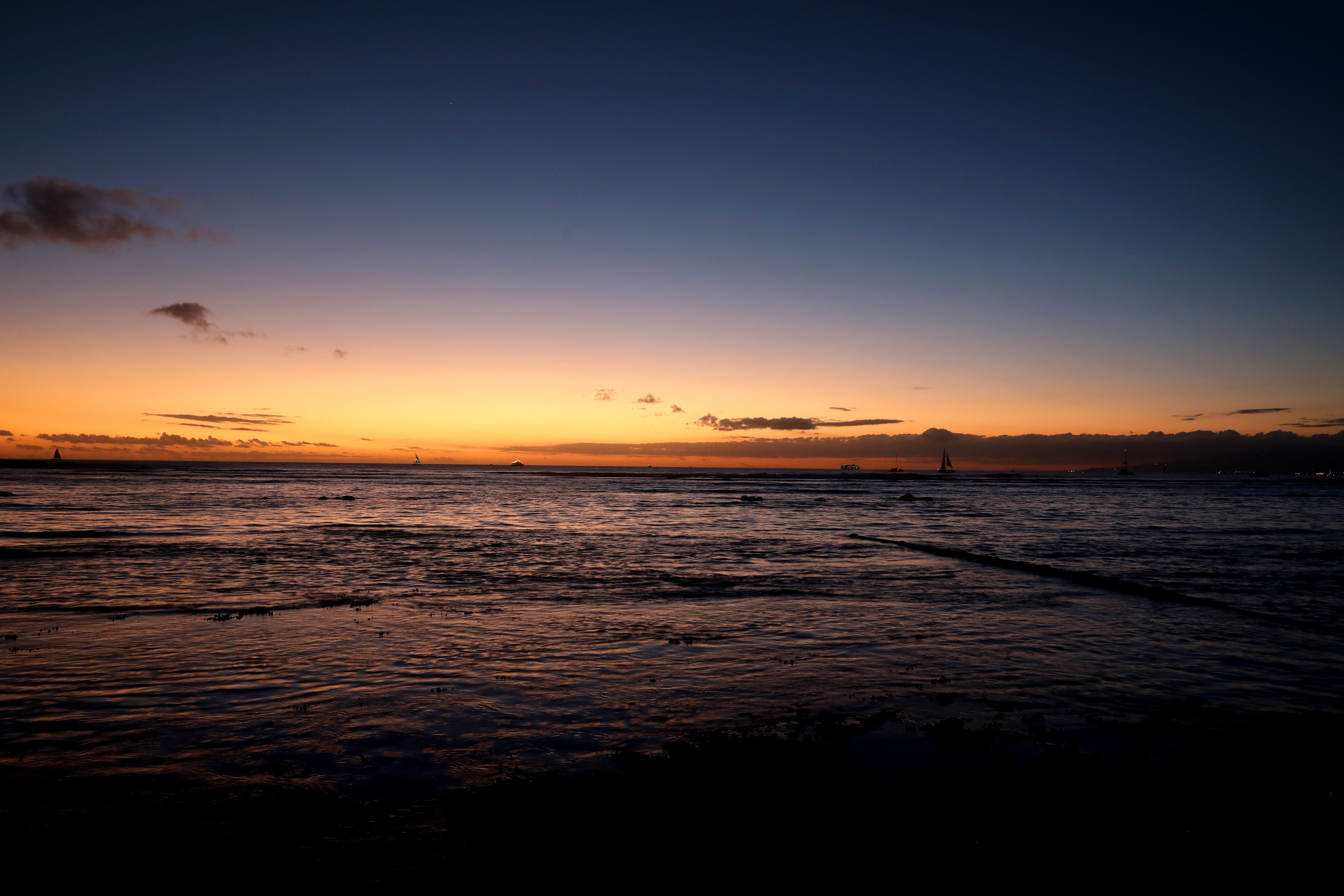

Kūhiō Beach Park is the site of three well-known statues and public artworks: the statue of Duke Kahanamoku by Jan Gordon Fisher (1990), the statue of Prince Jonah Kūhiō by Sean Browne (2001), and the monument the Stones of Life (1997), (in Hawaiian: Nā Pōhaku Ola O Kapaemahu A Me Kapuni), a sculpture incorporating ancient basaltic stones representing four legendary healers, Kapaemahu, Kahaloa, Kapuni and Kinohi, who came to Hawaii from distant lands.

== See also ==
- List of beaches in Oahu
