= Ala Wai Harbor =

Small boat and yacht harbor in Hawaii

Coordinates: 21.2841°N 157.8415°W

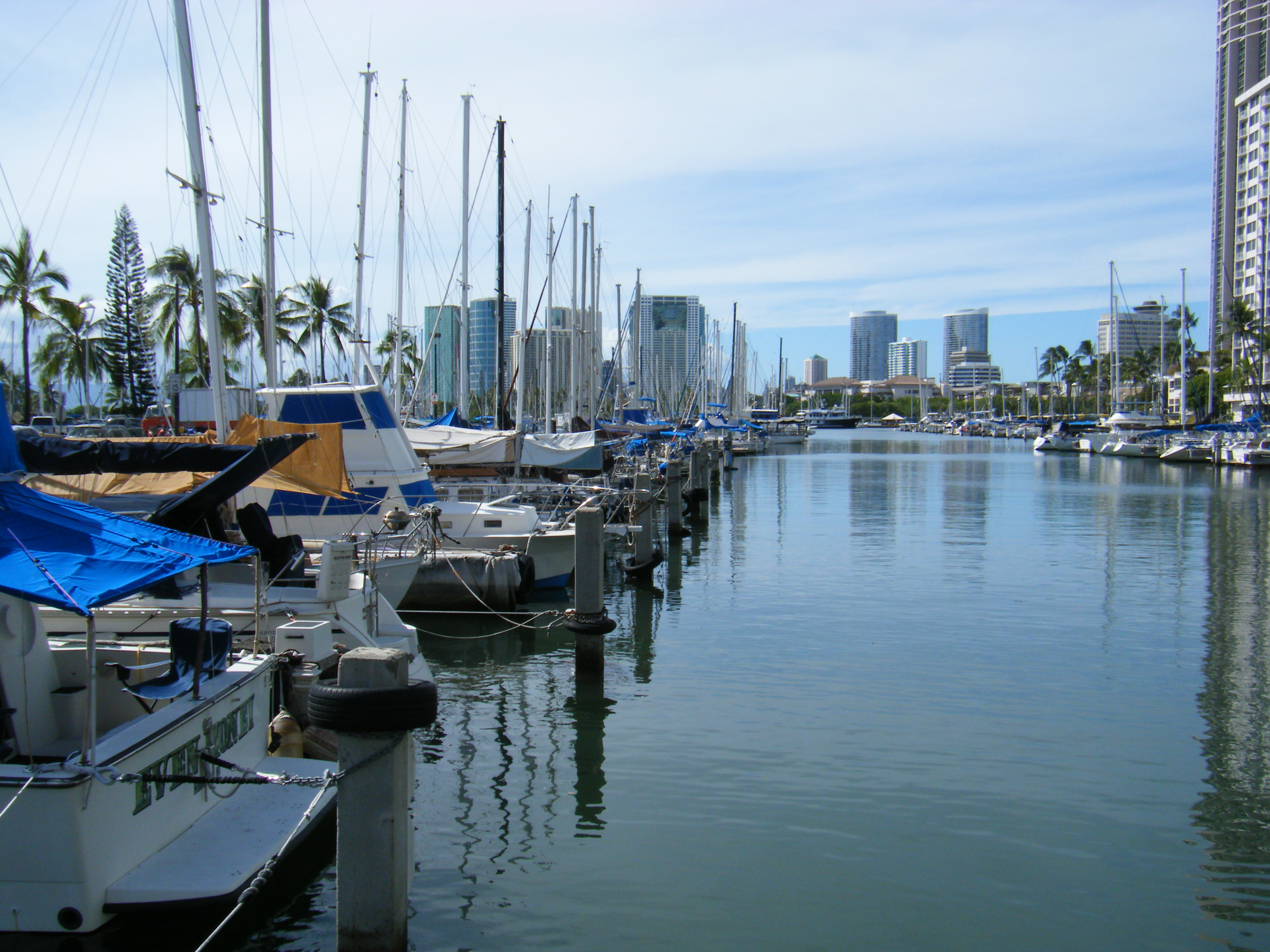
Ala Wai Harbor

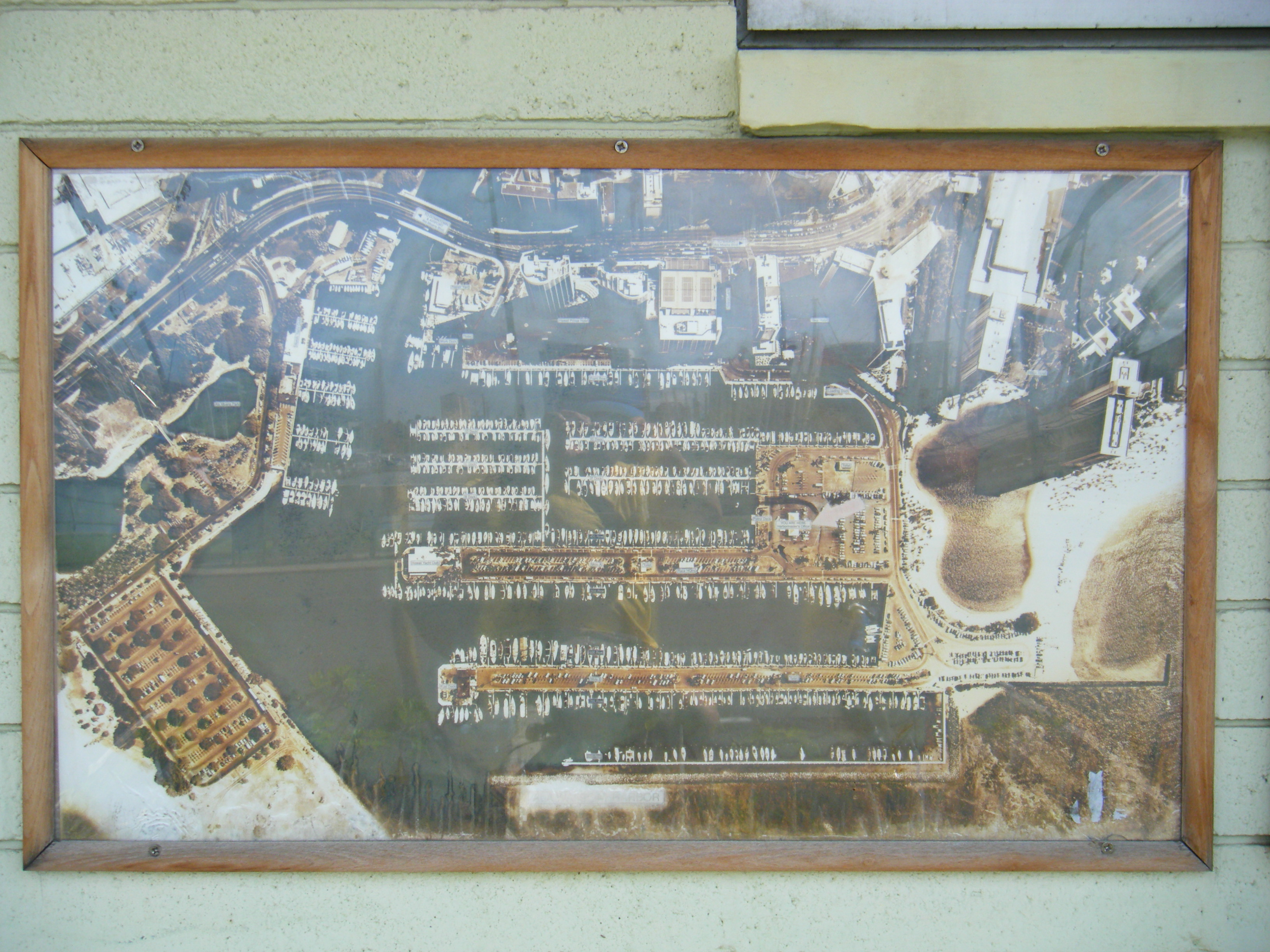
Ala Wai Harbor map

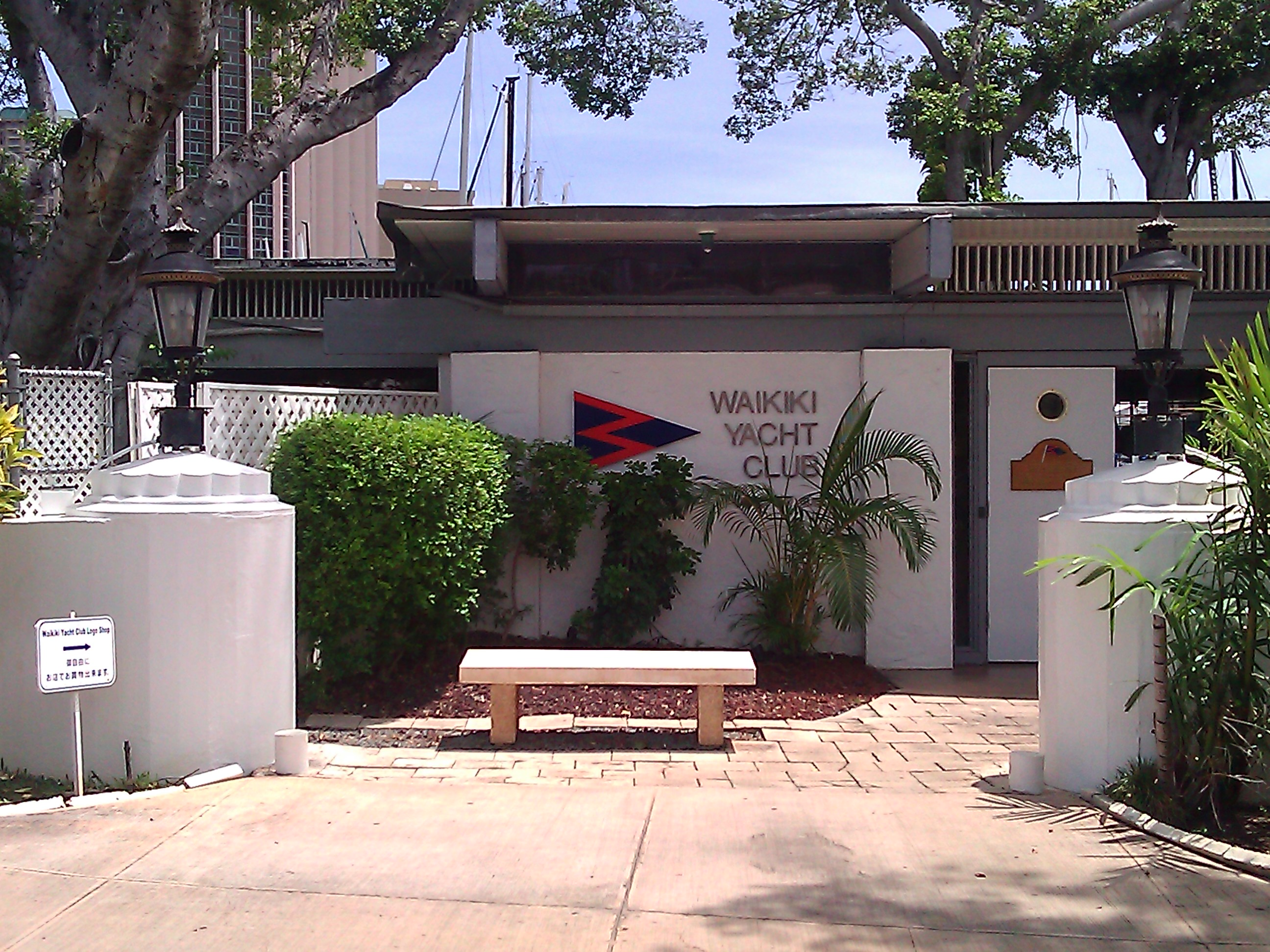
Waikiki Yacht Club

Ala Wai Harbor is the largest small boat and yacht harbor in Hawaii. The harbor is situated in Honolulu at the mouth of the Ala Wai Canal, between Waikiki and downtown Honolulu. To the east are Waikiki and Diamond Head; to the west, Magic Island and the Honolulu waterfront.

The harbor has 699 berths, 85 moorings, one boat ramp, and 22 dry storage spaces. It can accommodate vessels up to 85 feet (26 m) in length.

Free public parking, for 6 hours, can be found near the Hilton Lagoon and the beach/ surf break. Otherwise hourly parking is $1.00/hour for harbor users. This fee can be paid at the various parking terminals or via the app using the QR code available at the pay stations around the harbor.

The TransPac sailing race begins in Los Angeles and ends at the harbor, an event that takes place every two years. It is one of the world's longest-running ocean races.

Many Waikiki hotels are in the area, but the Prince Waikiki Hotel and the Hilton Hawaiian Village are essentially adjacent to the property, and the Ilikai Hotel is built on harbor land, paying rent into the boating special fund.

The harbor is home to the Waikiki Yacht Club and the Hawaii Yacht Club, which host junior sailing clubs, waterman programs to include surf ski and Hawaiian outrigger canoeing, weekly sailing races, and fishing tournaments. Boats from around the world find shelter in state harbor berths, and yacht club berths. There are no fuel facilities.

== Origins ==
Following dredging to widen a path to sea for the Ala Wai Canal through the reef, the Territorial Government initially constructed the Ala Wai Boat Harbor in 1935 at the mouth of the canal with purported financial support from the Hobron family, who had purchased land in the Kālia area.

Soon after, the Waikiki Yacht Club (founded in 1944) and the Hawai‘i Yacht Club (originally founded in 1901 by King David Kalākaua at Pearl Harbor) would establish their headquarters in the harbor.

In 1886 at the San Francisco Yacht Club, King Kalākaua, an avid waterman, pitched the idea of a 2,225 nautical mile race to Hawai‘i. This sparked the Transpacific Yacht Race, one of the world's most enduring long-distance sailing contests. The global attention of the Transpac incentivized much of the expansion of the Ala Wai Harbor; in 1967, a 1,460-foot-long breakwater was constructed to accommodate mooring of yachts, and in 2008, Hawai‘i Gov. Linda Lingle approved $6 million for infrastructure improvements citing "the economic value of prestigious yachting competitions".

== See also ==
- Ala Moana Beach Park
- Duke Paoa Kahanamoku Lagoon
