= Waikīkī =

Neighborhood of Honolulu, Hawaii, United States

- Neighborhood of Honolulu
- Waikīkī
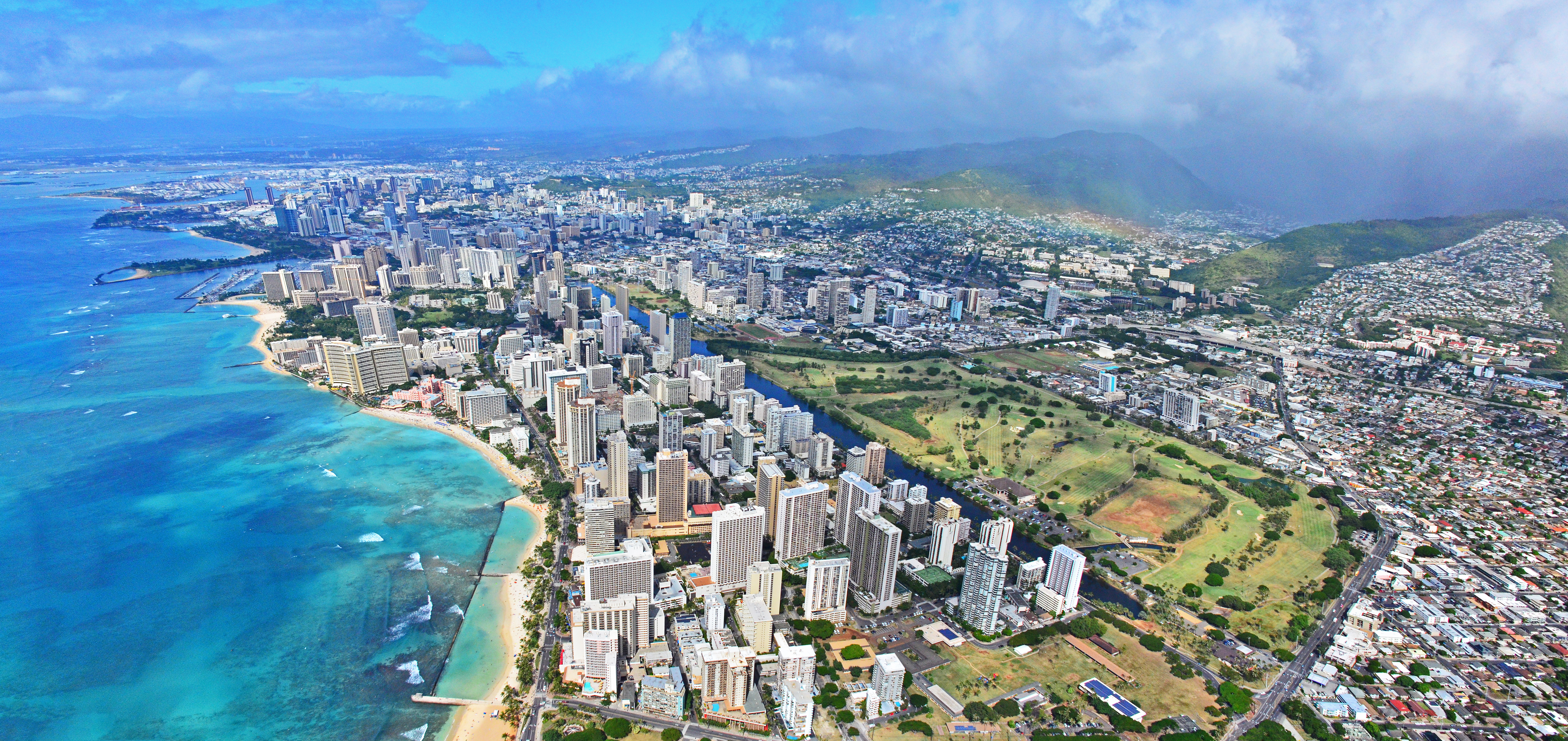
- Aerial view of Waikīkī
- Interactive map of Waikīkī
- Coordinates: 21.2752°N 157.8312°W
- Country: United States
- State: Hawaii
- County: City and County of Honolulu
- City: Honolulu

Area
  - Total: 3.4 sq mi (8.8 km^{2})

Population (2024)
  - Total: 19,862
- ZIP Code: 96815
- Area code: 808

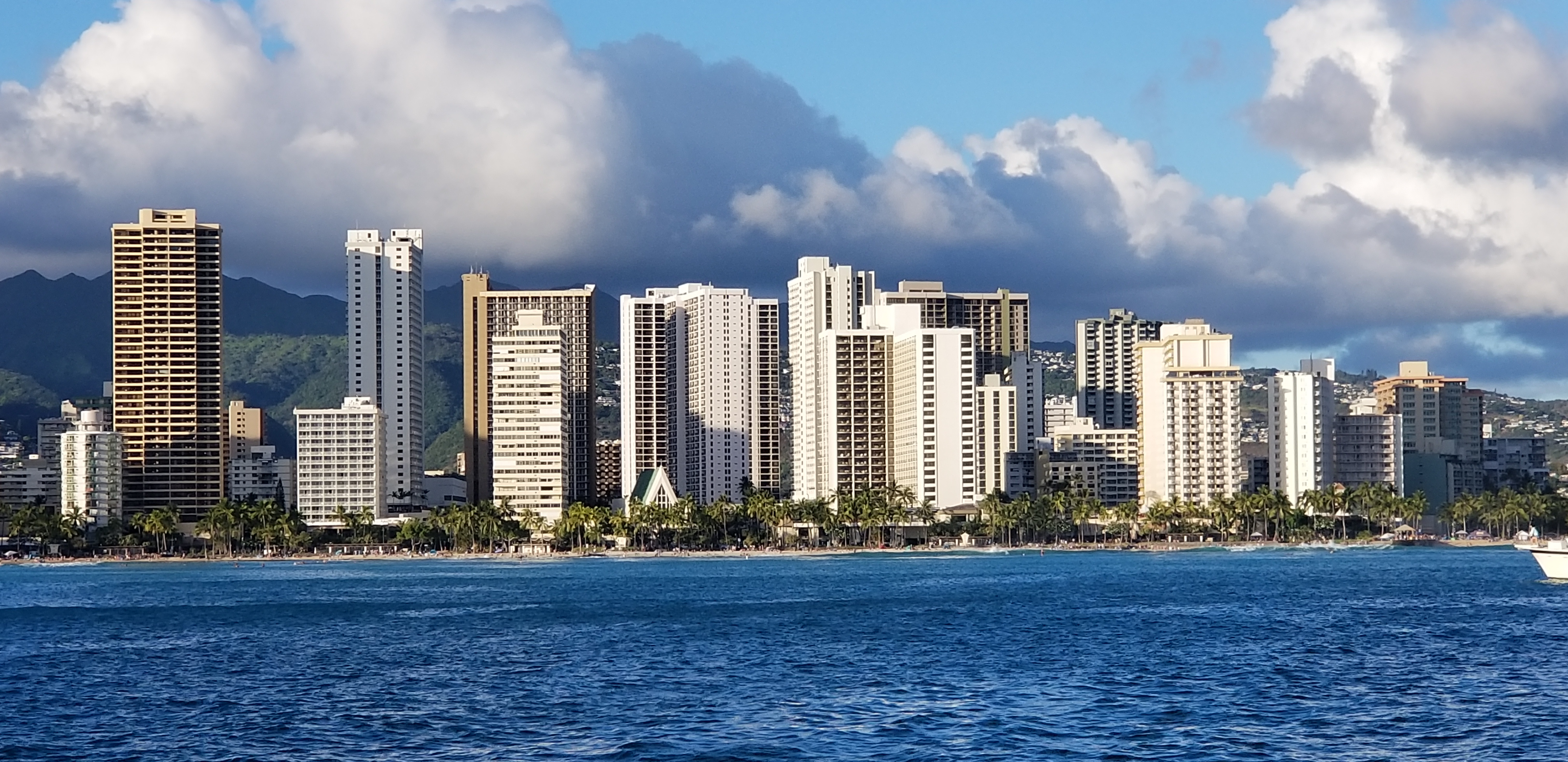
A view of Waikīkī from the ocean

Waikīkī (/ˌwaɪkɪˈkiː/; Hawaiian: [wɐjˈkiːkiː, vɐjˈtiːtiː]) is a Honolulu neighborhood and the eponymous Waikīkī beach on its south shore, on the island of Oʻahu in the U.S. state of Hawaii. (Despite situational use of the spelling "Waikiki", typically in materials aimed at tourists, the spelling "Waikīkī" is official and common.)

Waikīkī Beach is one of six beaches in the district, along with Queen's Beach, Kuhio Beach, Gray's Beach, Fort DeRussy Beach, and Kahanamoku Beach. The sandy beach is almost entirely man-made.

Waikīkī (Hawaii) is home to public places including Kapiʻolani Park, Fort DeRussy, Kahanamoku Lagoon, Kūhiō Beach Park, and Ala Wai Harbor. Waikīkī was the first capital of the Kingdom of Hawaii from 1795 to 1796.

== Etymology ==
The Hawaiian language name Waikīkī means "spouting fresh water", likely in reference to springs and streams that fed wetlands that once separated Waikīkī from the interior of the island.

== History ==
After the founding of the Kingdom of Hawaii, Waikīkī was its first capital from 1795 to 1796.

In the 1800s, the area was a retreat for Hawaiian royalty, who enjoyed surfing there on early forms of longboards.

A few small hotels opened in the 1880s. In 1893, Greek-American George Lycurgus leased the guest house of Allen Herbert and renamed it the "Sans Souci" (French for "without worries" or “carefree”) creating one of the first beach resorts. Later that year Robert Louis Stevenson stayed at the resort; subsequently it became a popular destination for mainland tourists. The area at coordinates 21°15′49″N 157°49′17″W is still called "Sans Souci Beach".

=== 20th century ===
In the early 1900s, Waikīkī was home to many wetlands, which were claimed to harbor disease-carrying mosquitoes. To get rid of the mosquitoes, developers created the Ala Wai canal. The canal, originally known as the Waikīkī Drainage Canal, was created by a Hawaiian dredging company run by Walter F. Dillingham. The project took about seven years, 1921–1928.

Duke Kahanamoku became a well-known surfer in Waikīkī. Throughout his life and after competing in the Olympics, many people around the world wanted to learn to surf. Duke's influence made Waikīkī beach a surfing hotspot. "Dukes", a club in Waikīkī named for Kahanamoku, helped Don Ho produce music and hosted the longest-running show in Waikīkī.

The first high-rise hotels on Waikīkī were built in 1955, including the Waikiki Biltmore and Sheraton Princess Kaiulani Hotel. Development boomed due to demand, and the area became filled with large resort hotels, such as the Hilton Hawaiian Village, Halekulani, the Hyatt Regency Waikiki, Marriott Waikiki, Sheraton Waikiki. These complemented historic hotels dating back to the early 20th century such as the Moana Surfrider Hotel and the Royal Hawaiian Hotel.

==== Changes in the shoreline ====
Waikīkī developed erosion problems starting in the late 1800s, as hotels and homes were built too close to the natural shoreline, while seawalls and other structures blocked the natural ebb and flow of sand along the beach.

In the 1920s and 1930s, sand was imported from Manhattan Beach, California, via ship and barge.

Before 1950, Waikīkī beaches were continuous. Then seawalls and groins began to appear. These helped build sand at one beach, but typically appropriated sand from others. They became separated into sections, some with sandy beach and others without. By 1950, more than 80 structures, including seawalls, groins, piers, and storm drains, occupied the Waikīkī shoreline.

Following World War II, Waikīkī beach restoration efforts have occurred every few years. Sand was imported to this artificial beach from the 1920s to the 1970s, once by boat and barge from Southern California. 1,730 feet (530 m) of shoreline was replenished at a cost of $2.4 million following chronic erosion of more than a foot a year.

Importing stopped in the 1970s. In March 1971, the Corps of Engineers Pacific Ocean Division, created a Draft Environmental Statement for the Kuhio Beach Sector of Waikīkī, which aimed to improve the overall quality and size of the fading and narrowing shoreline.

=== 21st century ===
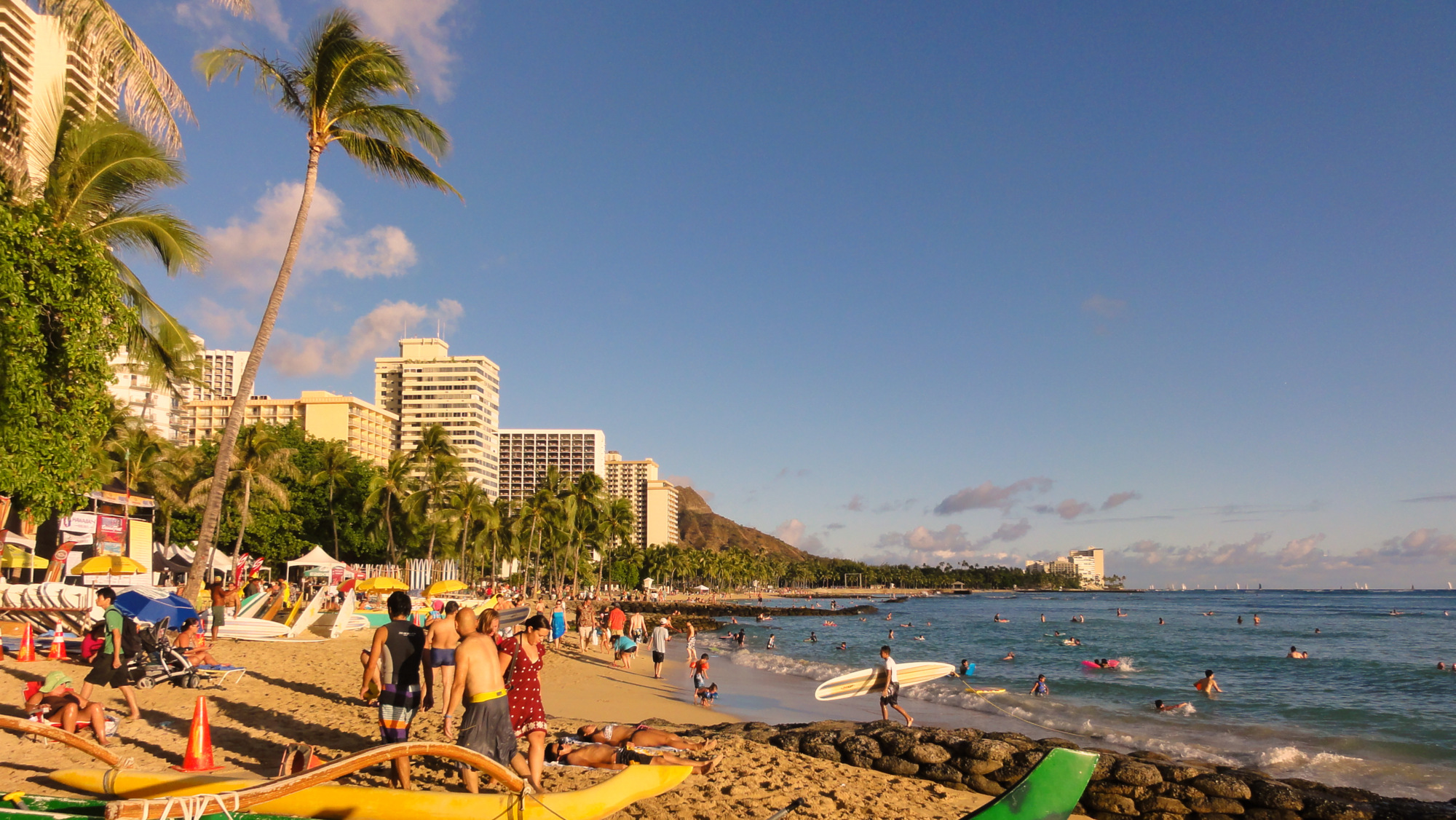
Waikīkī Beach, in 2011, looking towards Diamond Head

From October 29 through November 4, 2000, the first FINA World Open Water Swimming Championships were held in the waters off Waikīkī Beach.

A partial restoration was completed in the spring of 2012. The project imported sand from nearby shoals and widened the 1,700-foot-long (520 m) beach by about 37 feet (11 m) between the Royal Hawaiian Hotel concrete groin and the Kūhiō Beach crib wall. The project temporarily restored the beach to its 1985 shoreline. Two aging sandbag groin structures were also removed that year.

In 2017, beach erosion worsened with high-energy king tides and elevated sea levels. Honolulu's mayor said: "I'm not a scientist, but I'll get a jackhammer in there and remove all the concrete that's there creating this backwash and sucking out more sand. Plus it's just downright dangerous."

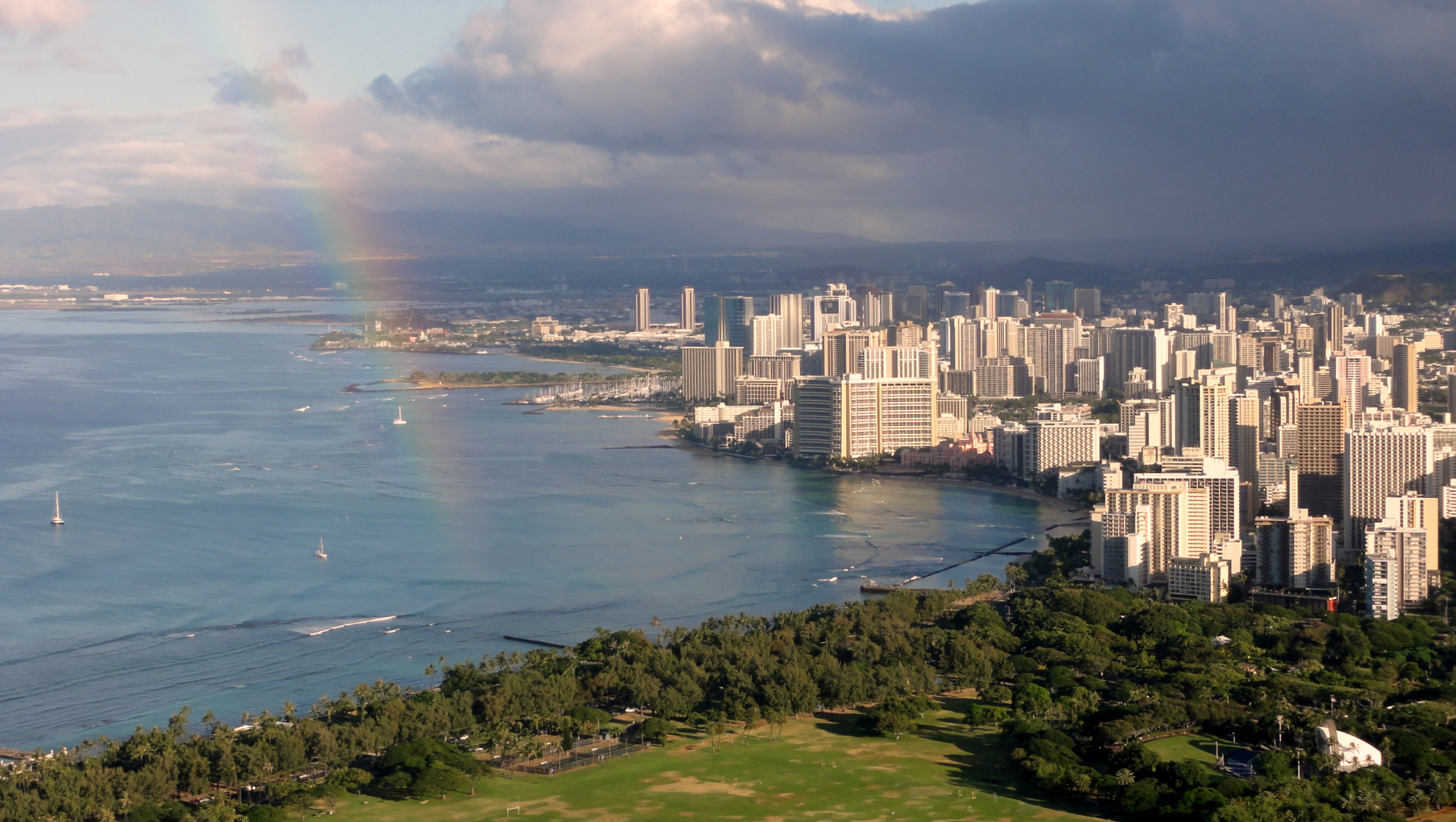
Waikīkī beach as seen from Diamond Head

The beach hosts many events, including surf competitions, outdoor performances, hula dancing, and outrigger canoe races. Waikīkī's many amenities, shops, and hotels generate about 42 percent of Hawaiʻi's visitor revenue.

== Geography ==
The neighborhood extends from the Ala Wai Canal (a channel dug to drain wetlands) on the west and north, to Diamond Head (Lēʻahi, tuna brow) on the east. Waikīkī Beach is noted for its views of the Diamond Head tuff cone, its usually warm and cloud-free climate, and its surf break. The Waikīkī skyline is filled with high-rises and resort hotels.

=== Beaches ===
==== Waikīkī Beach ====
Before 1950, the beach in the Waikīkī neighborhood was continuous and known as Waikīkī Beach. Seawalls and other developments have since separated the coast into eight distinct beaches. Since 1951, nearly 2,800,000 cubic feet (80,000 m^{3}) of sand has been added to restore the beach in the region, but it is believed that little of the added sand remains. As of 2020 the family of beaches in the region are still called "Waikīkī Beach", but most venues and addresses use the name of a specific subsidiary beach.

From Waikīkī Beach the sunset in the sea is visible from mid-September to late March. Half of the beach is marked off for surfers. For some distance into the ocean the water is quite shallow, with numerous rocks on the bottom. The waves can have some force, particularly on windy days. The surf is known for its long rolling break, making it ideal for long boarding, tandem surfing, and beginners.

==== Subsidiary beaches ====
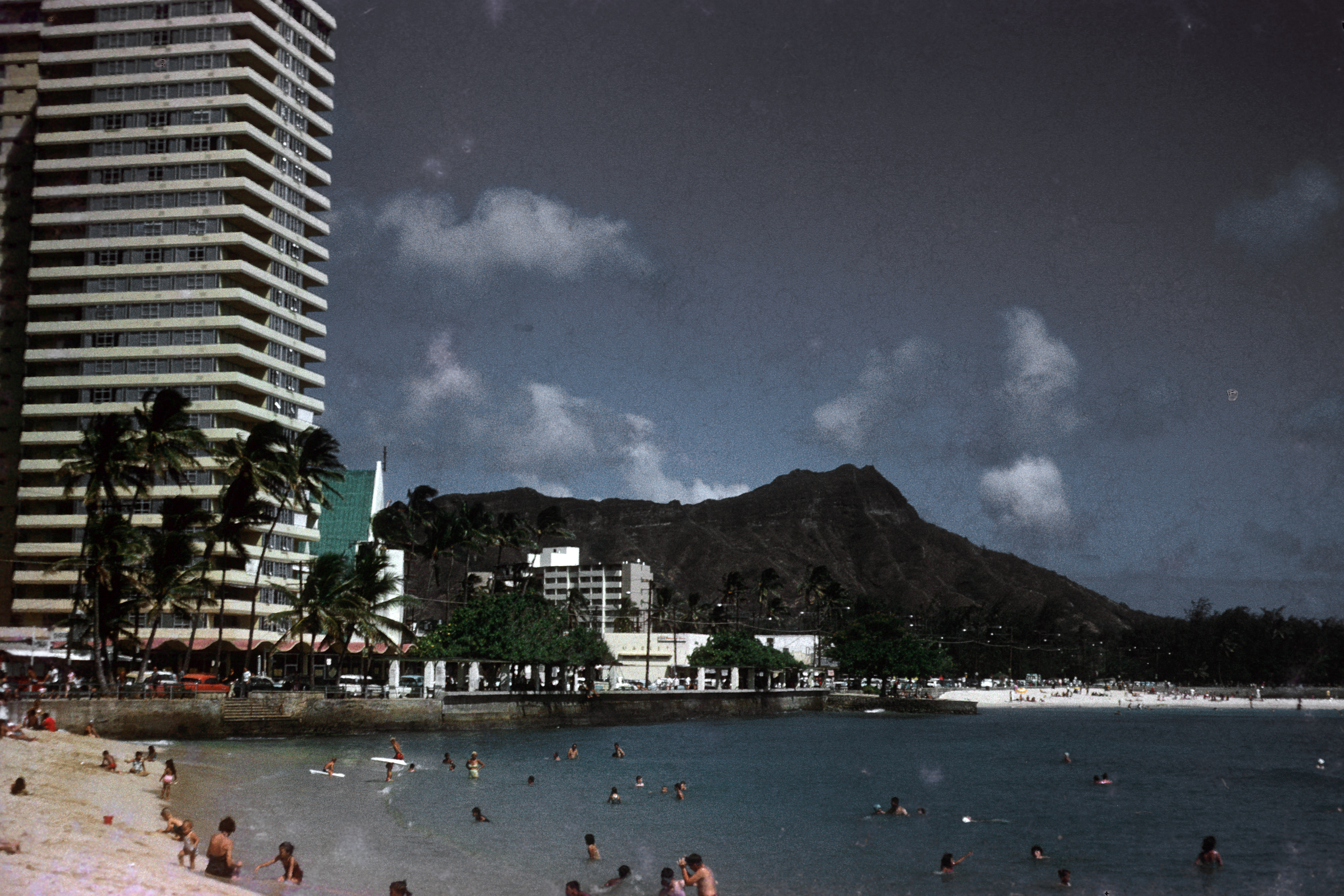
Waikīkī Beach in June 1963

Largely as a result of shoreline development, Waikīkī has eight beaches. They are Fort DeRussy Beach, Duke Kahanamoku Beach, Halekulani Beach, Royal Hawaiian Beach, Kūhiō Beach, Kapiʻolani Beach, Queens Beach, and Kaimana Beach.

=== Thoroughfares ===
Waikīkī's main thoroughfare is Kalākaua Avenue, named after King Kalākaua. It houses most of the high-end hotels (Royal Hawaiian, Sheraton, Hyatt, Marriott, Moana Surfrider Hotel), most of the luxury designer brand stores (Apple Store, Chanel, Louis Vuitton, Prada, Burberry, Dior, Tiffany & Co., Fendi, Harry Winston, Saint Laurent, Gucci, and Hermès), a department store (Macy's), and popular surf clothing brand stores (Quiksilver, Billabong, Volcom). Waikīkī's other main thoroughfare, Kūhiō Avenue, named after Prince Kūhiō, is better known for its restaurants, cafes, and grocers, along with clubs, nightlife, and prostitution.

== Public art ==
In 1990, Gordon Fisher's 9-foot (3 m) bronze statue of Duke Kahanamoku was installed at Waikīkī Beach, accompanied by a bronze replica of his surfboard, honorary spears, and commemorative bronze plaques. It serves as a culture and tourist locale with thousands of annual visitors and numerous cultural events. In 1997, Billy Fields's The Stones of Life (in Hawaiian: Nā Pōhaku Ola O Kapaemahu A Me Kapuni), a sculpture incorporating ancient basaltic stones, was installed nearby. It is considered a local monument. In 1990, the Gandhi Memorial International Foundation and the Jhamandas Watumull Fund gave Honolulu "A Fistful of Salt", a bronze sculpture by Stephen Lowe of Mahatma Gandhi. It is in Kapiʻolani Park.

At Kūhiō Beach and Queens Beach, three public artworks were installed in the early 2000s. Sean Browne's bronze statue of Prince Jonah Kuhio and Holly Young's children's story sculpture Makua and Kila were installed in 2001. Robert Pashby's Surfer on a Wave was installed at Queens Beach in 2003.

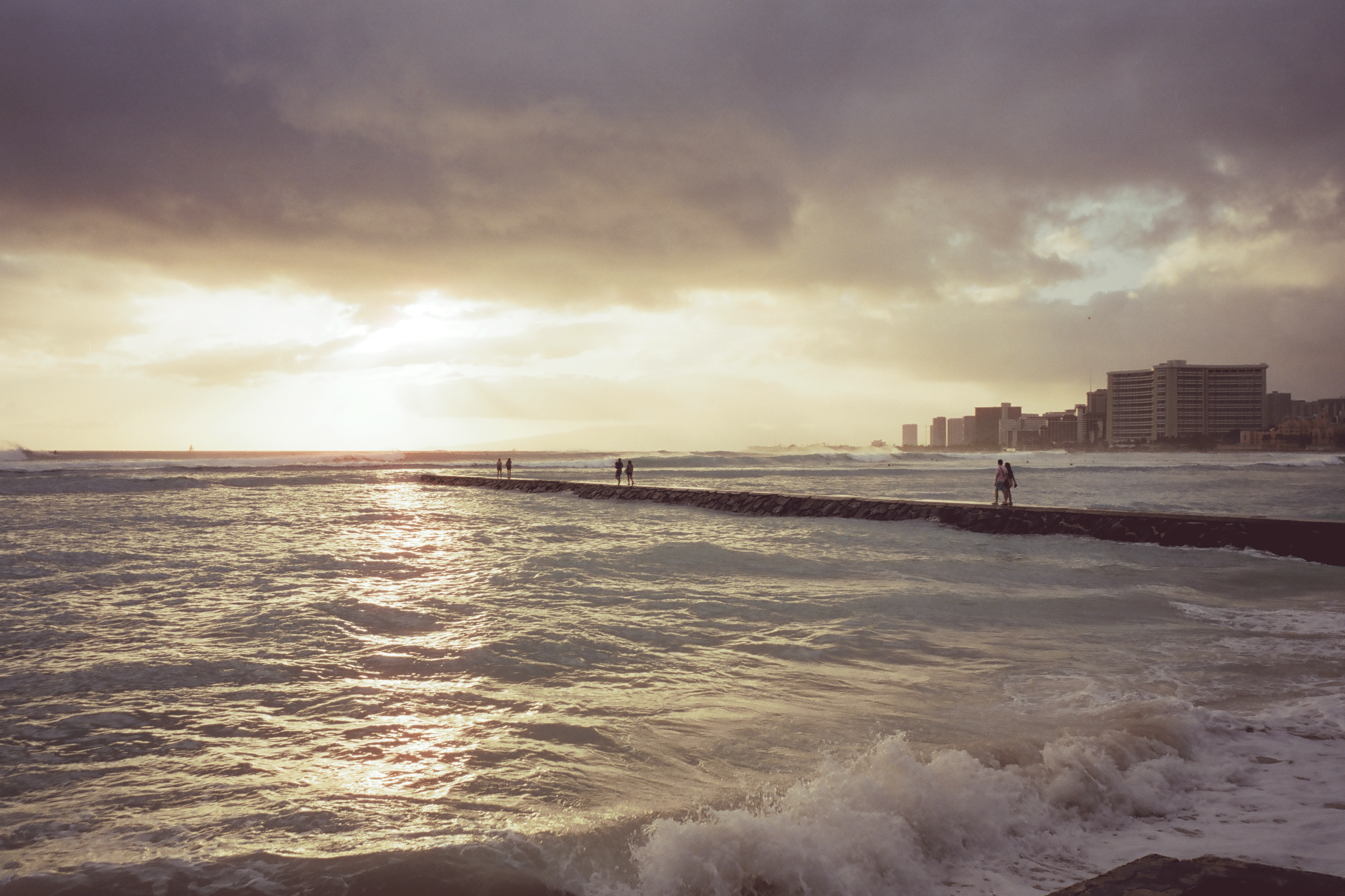
Waikīkī at sunset

== Beach issues ==
=== Erosion ===
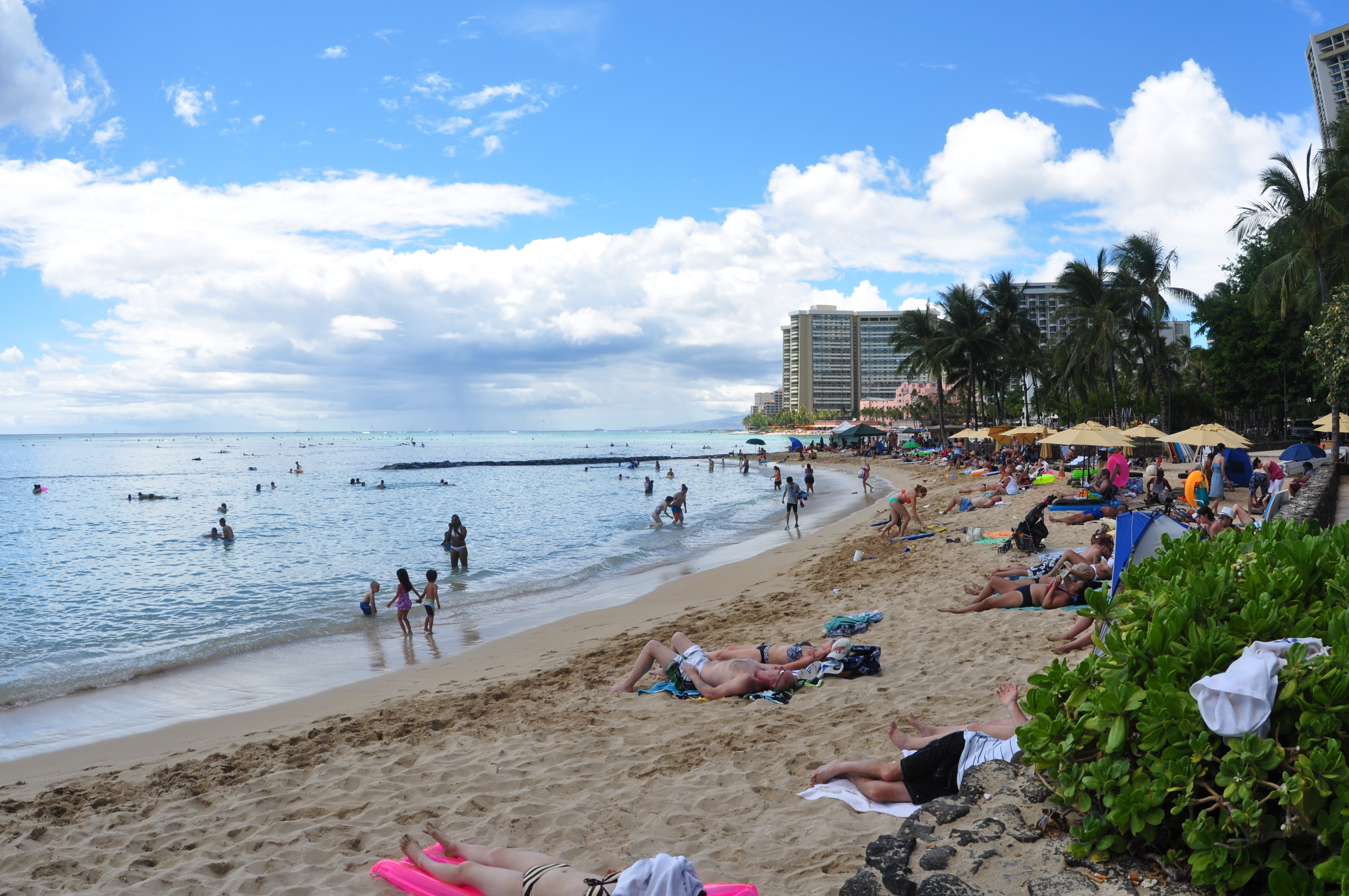
Waikiki Beach erosion in 2011

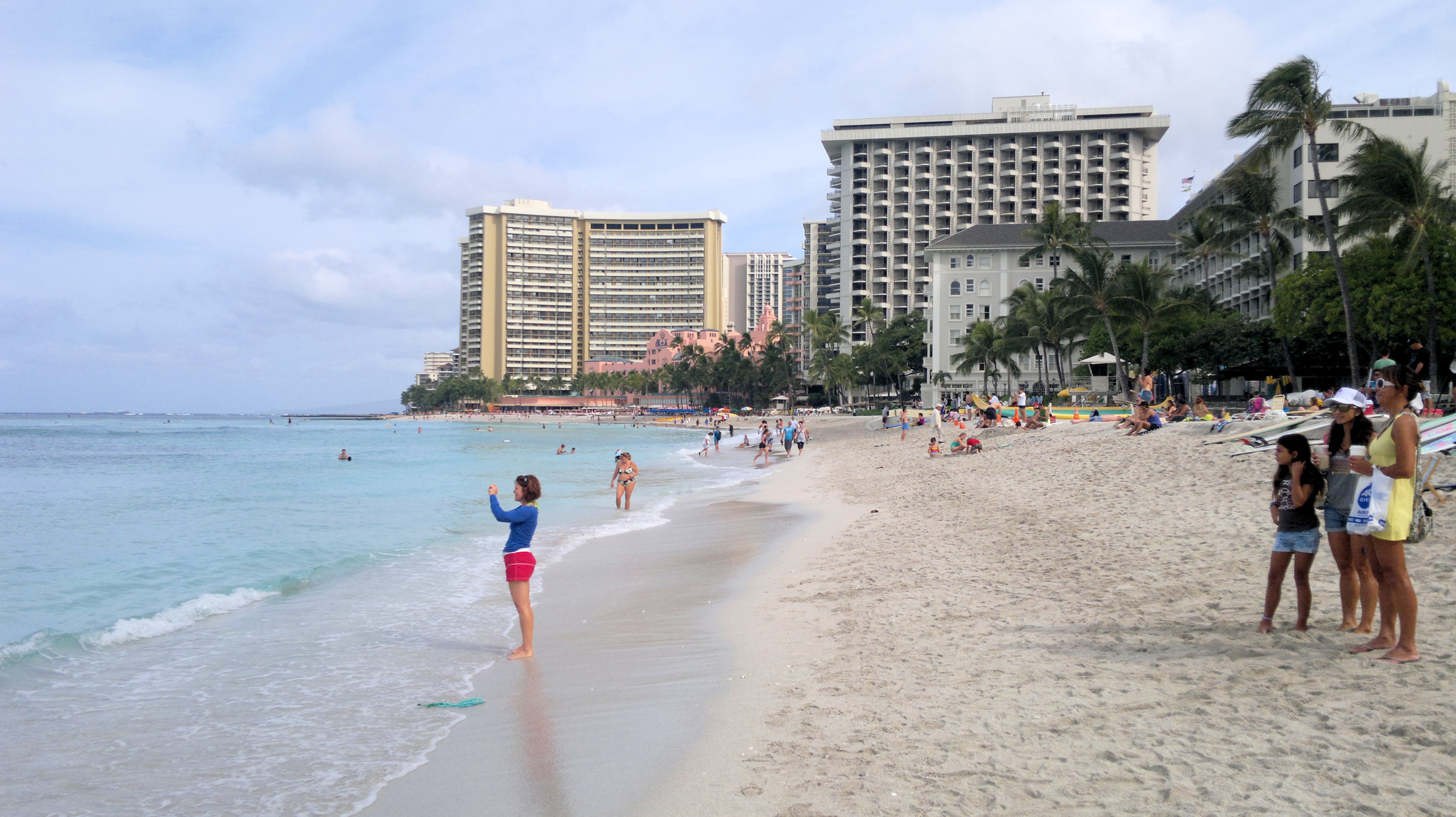
The restored Beach in June 2012

Waikīkī beach has had repeated problems with erosion, leading to the construction of groins and beach replenishment projects. Imported sand came from California, local beaches such as Pāpōhaku Beach on Moloka‘i, and a sandbar from Oʻahu's Northern side near Kahuku. Officials look for ways to sustain the existing sand by eliminating loss due to tidal flow.

Erosion claims about one foot (0.3 m) of beach per year. Local sources are sought for sand to replenish the beach.

=== Water quality ===
Waikīkī Beach had repeated contamination problems due to sewage spills in 2017.

=== Homelessness ===
Many homeless people settle around the beach because of the public shower and sanitary facilities available there. The Honolulu Police Department has increased patrolling in and around Waikīkī Beach with assistance from other city agencies and local businesses to prevent homeless people from camping in the area.

== Education ==
The Hawaii State Department of Education operates public schools throughout Hawaii. Thomas Jefferson Elementary School is in Waikīkī proper and Waikīkī Elementary School is nearby, at the makai (seaward) edge of the Kapahulu neighborhood.

The Hawaii State Public Library System operates the Waikīkī Public Library.

== Twin towns – sister cities ==
Waikīkī is twinned with:

- Freshwater, New South Wales, Australia
- Bixby, Oklahoma, United States
- Rotorua, New Zealand

== Gallery ==
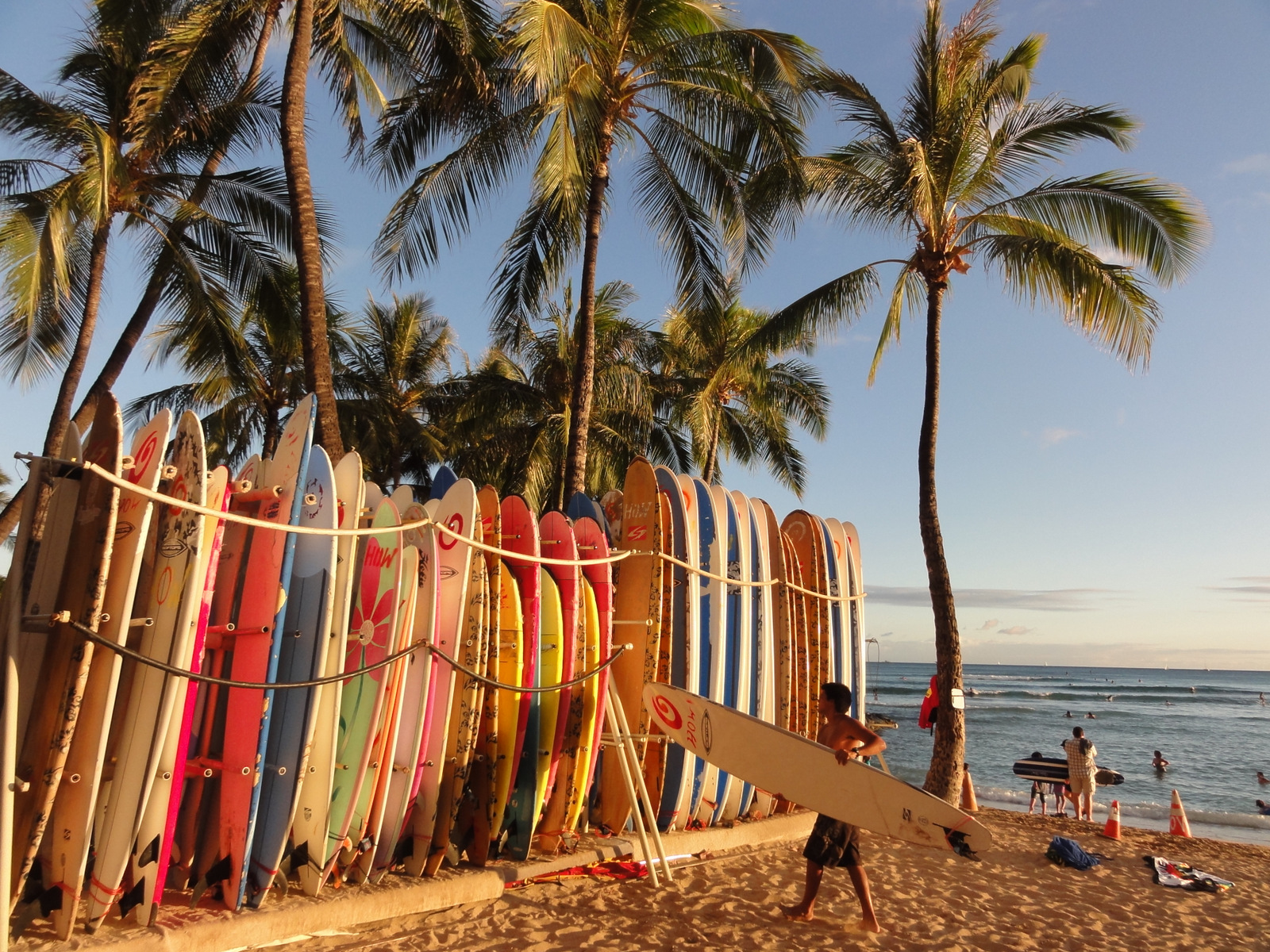
Surfboards in Waikīkī

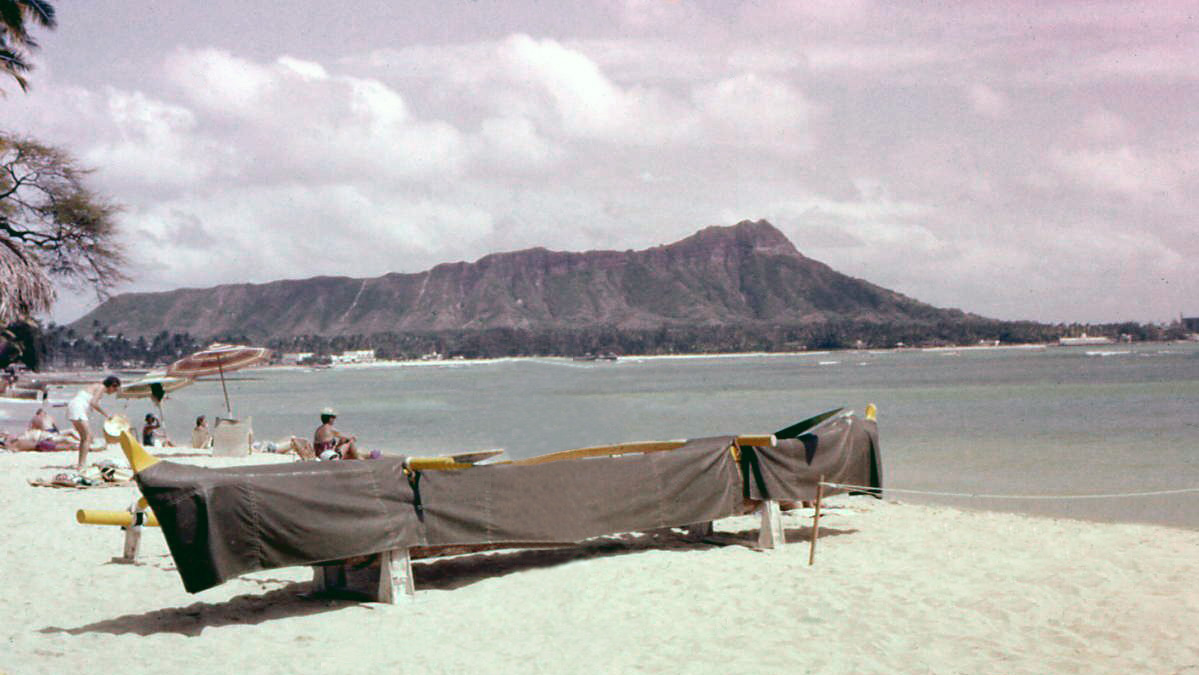
Waikiki Beach facing Diamond Head, 1958

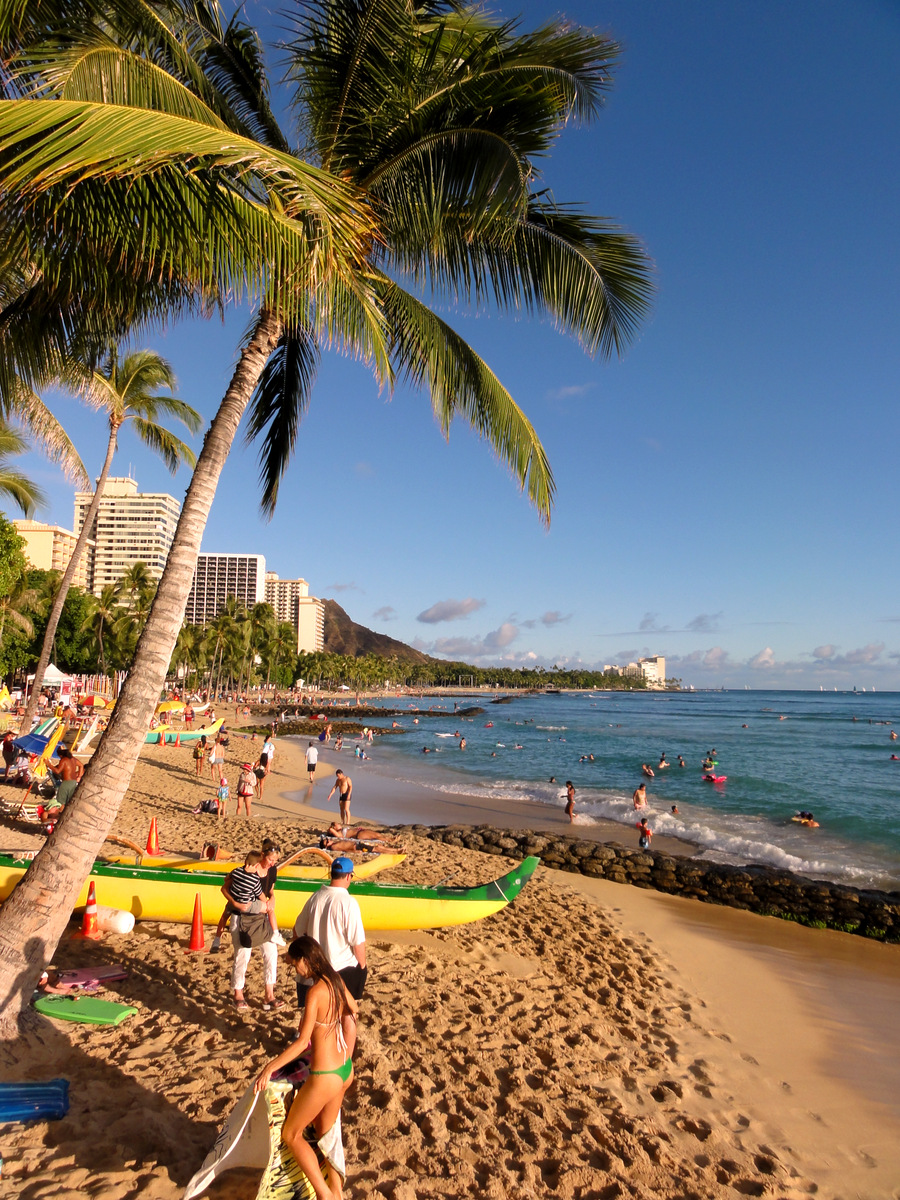
Waikīkī Beach view

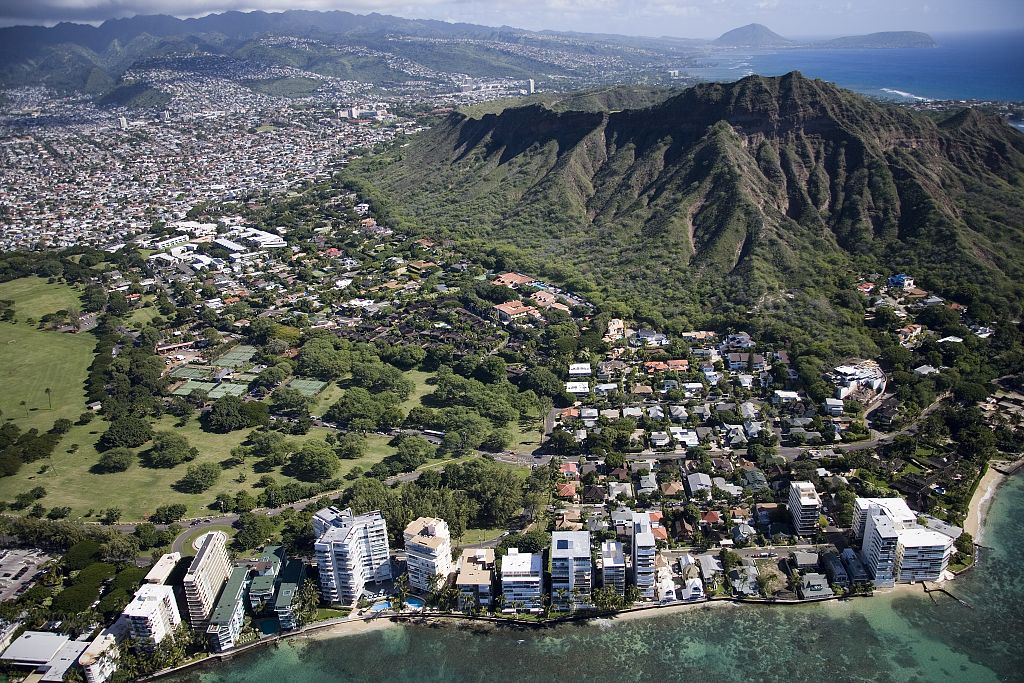
Aerial view of Waikīkī Beach and Honolulu

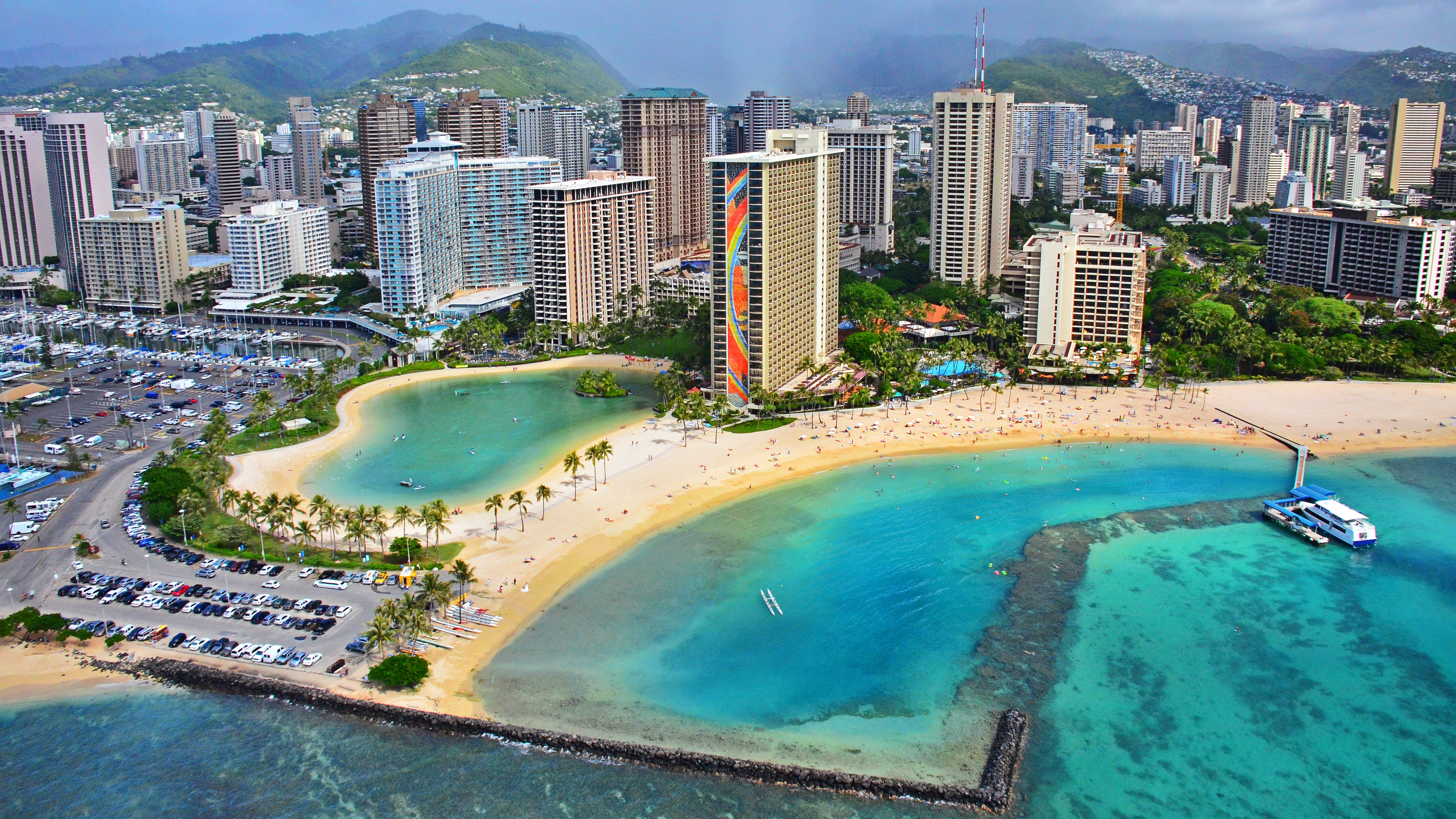
Aerial view of Duke Kahanamoku Lagoon

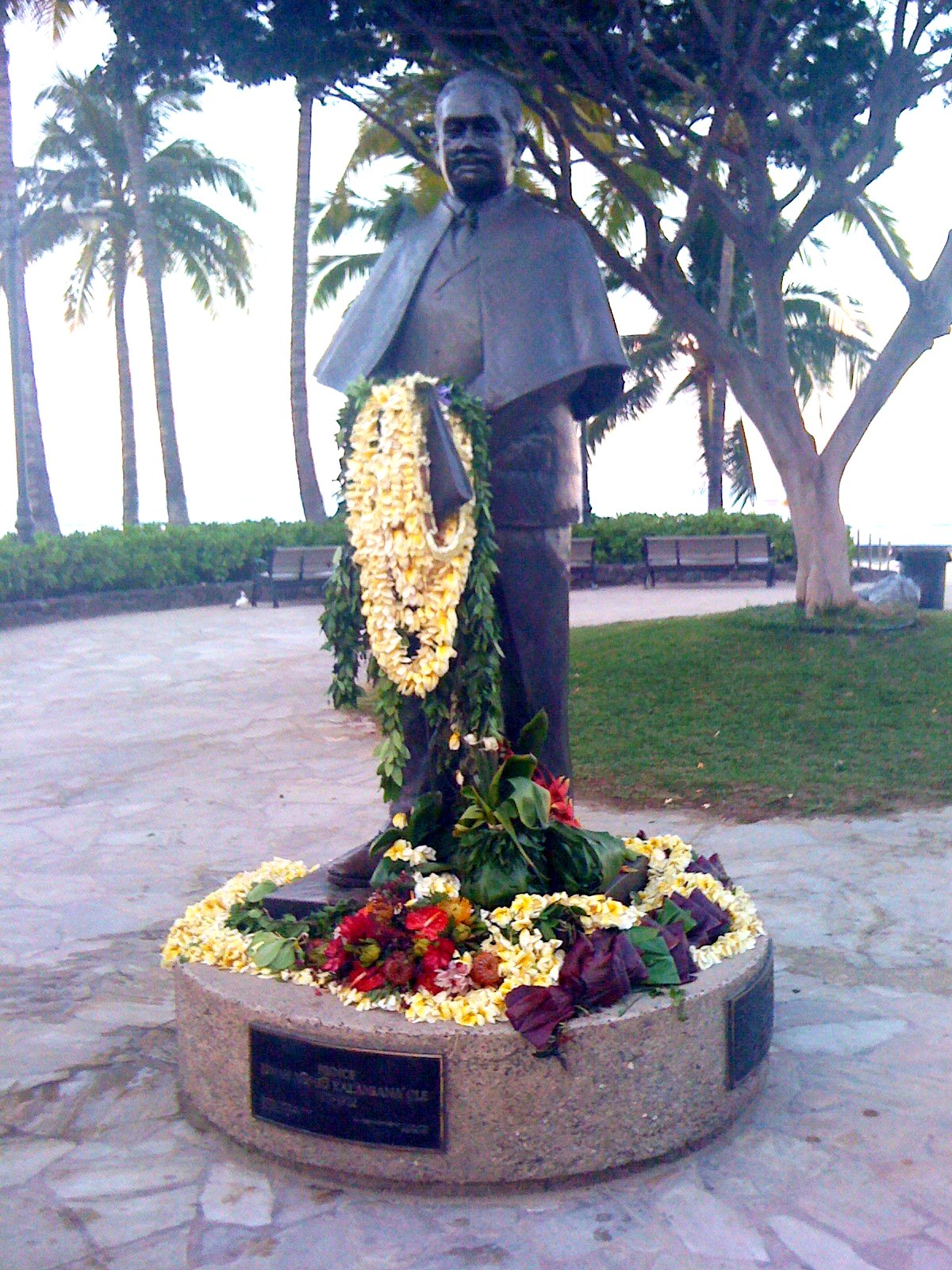
Statue of Prince Kūhiō in Waikīkī

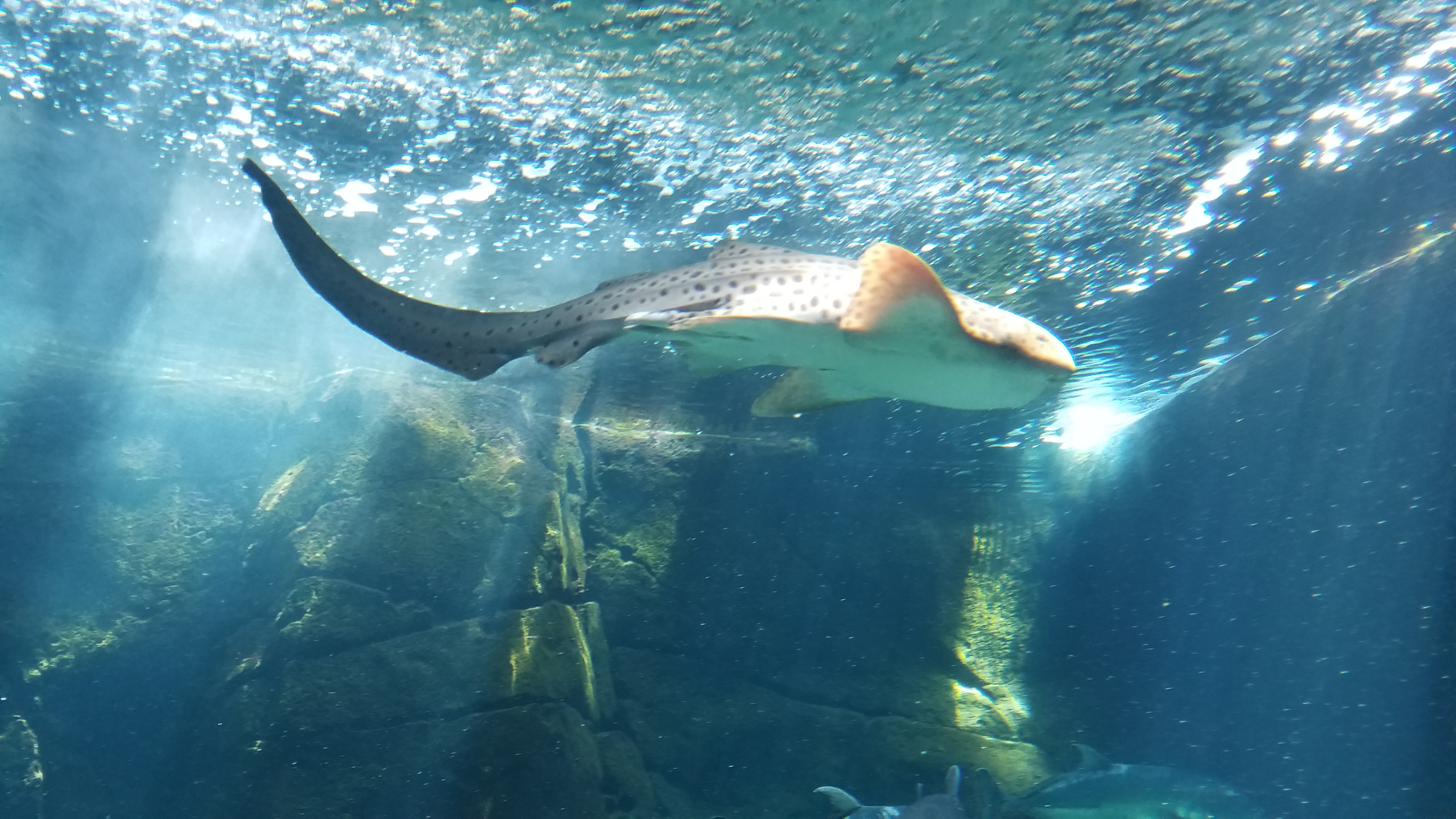
A zebra shark swimming at Waikiki Aquarium

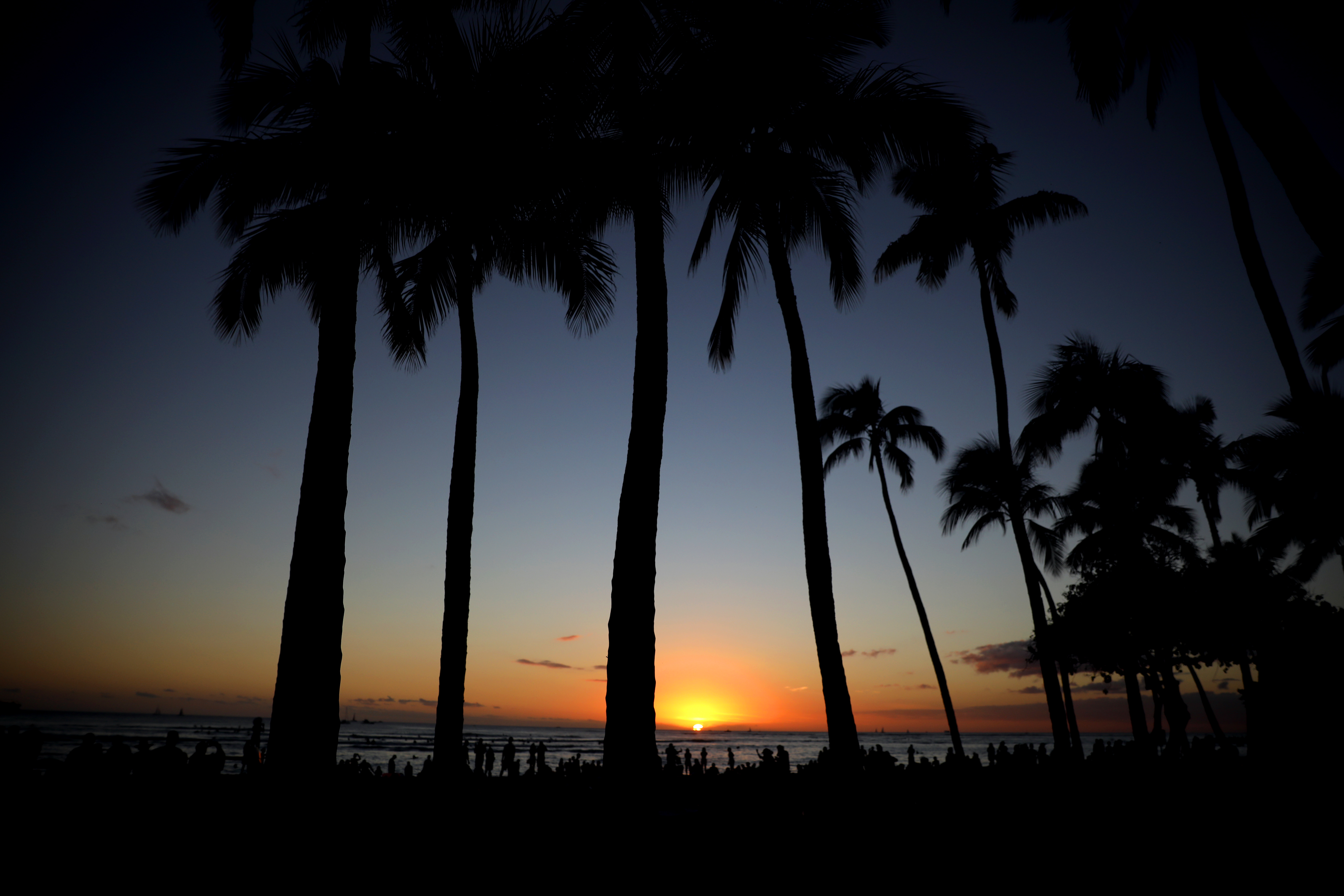
A view of the sunset

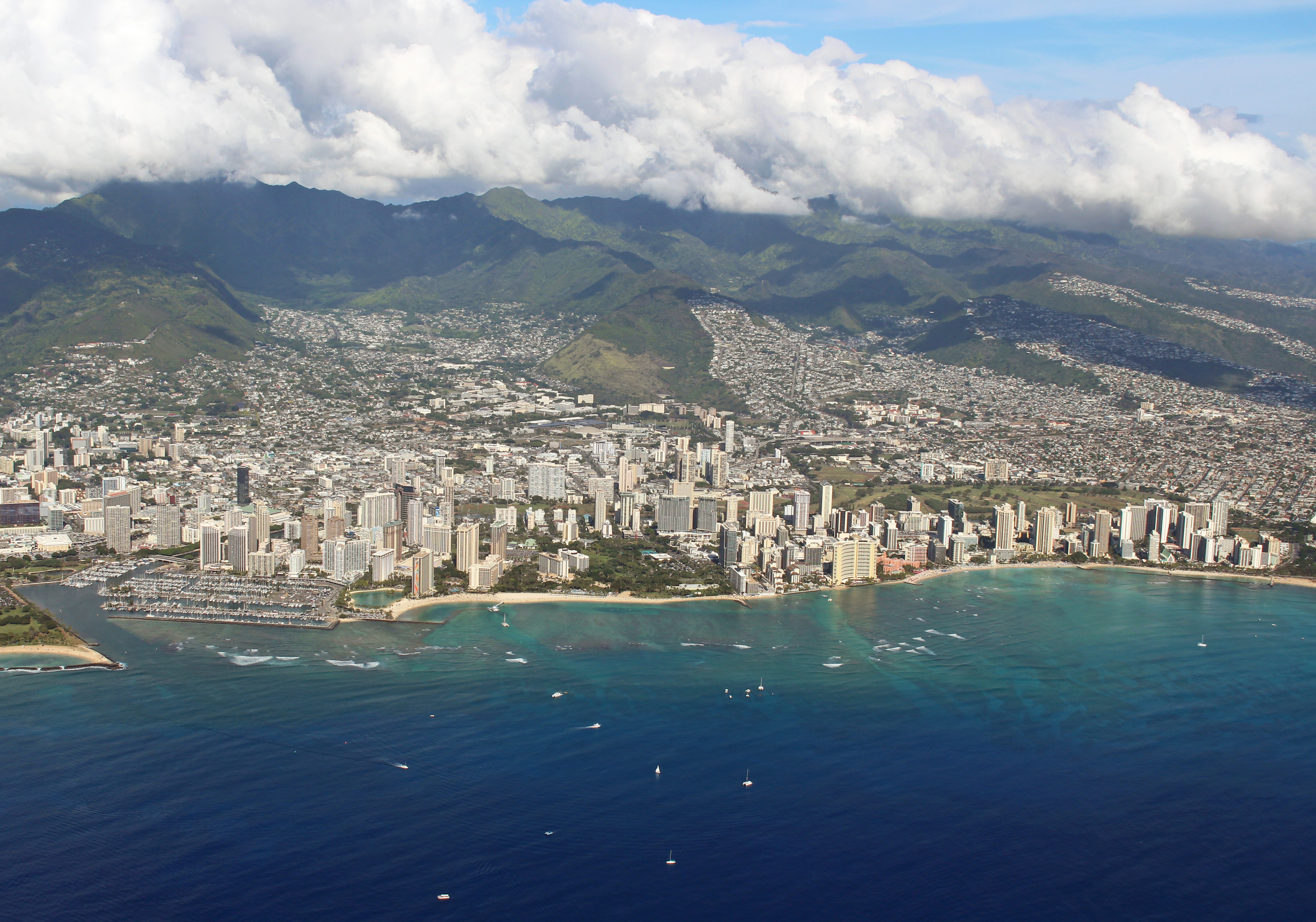
View from aircraft departing Daniel K. Inouye International Airport

== See also ==
- List of leading shopping streets and districts by city
- Save Our Surf
- Waikiki Trolley
