= List of University of Hawaii alumni =

This article lists the alumni of the University of Hawaiʻi. Alumni who also served as faculty are listed in bold font, with degree and year in parentheses. An asterisk (*) shows those who attended, but did not graduate.

== Academics, research, science and medicine ==
- Theresa H. Arriola (MA in Anthropology), cultural anthropologist
- Alice Augusta Ball (M.S. in Chemistry, 1915), chemist
- Bob Ballard (M.S. 1966), oceanographer
- Elizabeth Birch, LGBT rights activist
- Joani Blank (M.A. 1964 Asian Studies), sex educator, entrepreneur
- Gladys Kamakakuokalani Brandt, educator
- Gordon Cooper*, astronaut
- Mercedes Delfinado, acarologist
- Ben Finney (M.A. 1959), anthropologist
- Allison Fong, oceanographer
- Jamie S. Foster (Ph.D. in Zoology)
- Dennis Gonsalves
- Valerie Hu (B.S. 1972), professor, biochemist, and molecular biologist who studies autism
- Jerome Kim (B.A. 1980), director general of the International Vaccine Institute
- Richard C. Kim (B.A. 1988), United States Army brigadier general
- Robert A. Kinzie III (M.S. 1966), biology and zoology professor
- Ed Lu (postdoctoral fellow, Institute for Astronomy), astronaut
- Ah Quon McElrath (1915–2008), labor rights activist
- Edith Kawelohea McKinzie (1925–2014), author, genealogist and educator
- Abbas Milani (Ph.D. 1974), professor, historian, author
- Kenneth P. Moritsugu (B.A. 1967), Surgeon General of the United States
- Newton Ennis Morton (B.A. 1951), founder of genetic epidemiology
- Lourdes Ortega, linguist
- Abdul Rashid (D.Sc. 1986), scientist
- Shunzo Sakamaki, Japanese studies researcher
- Maya Soetoro-Ng (Ph.D. 2006), educator and maternal half-sister of Barack Obama
- Leslie Denis Swindale, soil scientist and Padma Bhushan awardee
- Myron "Pinky" Thompson, Kamehameha Schools trustee
- Nainoa Thompson, Native Hawaiian navigator and president of the Polynesian Voyaging Society
- Joyce Sachiko Tsunoda (B.A. 1960, Ph.D. 1966), college administrator
- Brett Wigdortz OBE, founder & CEO of Teach First
- Arfa Sayeda Zehra, Pakistani educationist and Urdu language expert

== Arts, literature, journalism, and media ==
- Paula Akana, journalist
- Kristina Anapau*, actress and model
- Richard Arnest, composer, performer
- Angela Perez Baraquio, model
- Larry Beil, sportscaster, anchor
- Allison Bianco (MFA), artist and printmaker
- Beau Bridges*, actor
- Allyn Bromley (MFA), artist and art educator
- Kenneth Wayne Bushnell (M.F.A., 1961), professor, visual artist
- Georgia Engel (B.A. 1967), actress
- Dorothy Faison (B.F.A. 1977), artist
- Helen Gilbert, artist (M.F.A. 1968)
- Brett Graham (born 1967), New Zealand sculptor
- Alexander Greendale (B.A.), playwright and civic leader
- Ella Halikas, model, activist, and social media influencer
- Sherwood Hu, stage, film and TV director
- Kathy Jetnil-Kijiner (M.A. 2014), Marshallese climate change activist and poet
- Jason Jones (B.A. 1998 Political Science), activist, filmmaker
- Thom Jones, author
- Carole Kai, singer, artist
- Ah Jook Ku (B.A. 1933), journalist, first Asian American female reporter for Honolulu Star-Bulletin
- Kapulani Landgraf (BA, 1989), artist
- Brook Mahealani Lee*, model
- Eli Marozzi (MFA, 1952), artist
- John Maus (PHD, 2014), musician and singer
- Rick Mills (BFA, 1980), art educator and glass artist
- Esther T. Mookini, linguist and translator
- Deborah Nehmad (MFA 1998), artist and attorney
- Michael Okuda (B.A. 1978 Communications), artist
- Yukio Ozaki (M.F.A. 1977), ceramist, educator
- Aaron Padilla (B.F.A. 1996), artist and art educator
- Stan Sakai (B.F.A.), comic book creator
- Michael Savage (MA, MS), conservative talk-show host
- Kelly Shinn*, contestant on Survivor: Nicaragua
- Kazimir Strzepek (computer animation), cartoonist
- Linda Taira, first Japanese-American woman to work as a correspondent on network television
- Dietrich Varez (B.A. English), artist, printmaker
- Hinaleimoana Wong-Kalu, also known as Kumu Hina (B.A.), cultural practitioner, performer
- Lois-Ann Yamanaka (B.Ed. 1983, M.Ed. 1987), author
- Tseng Yu-ho (M.F.A.), artist and art historian

== Athletics ==
- Robyn Ah Mow-Santos, US national volleyball team
- Ikaika Alama-Francis, former pro football player
- Gary Allen, former pro football player
- Brad Anae, former pro football player
- Dan Audick, former NFL offensive lineman
- Dino Babers, current head football coach at Syracuse
- Jimmie Baker, former pro basketball player
- Jake Bauers, MLB infielder/outfielder
- Joey Beltran (attended), currently competing in mixed martial arts, formerly in the UFC's Heavyweight Division
- Davone Bess, former pro football player
- Heather Bown, USA indoor volleyball Olympian
- Glenn Braggs, former pro baseball player
- Colt Brennan, former Hawaii quarterback and pro football player
- Anthony Carter, pro basketball player
- Timmy Chang, former pro football player; current Hawaii Rainbow Warriors football head coach
- Raphel Cherry, former pro football player
- Larry Cole, former pro football player
- Chuck Crim, former pro baseball player
- Jared Dillinger, professional basketball player
- Jason Elam, former pro football player
- Nuu Fa'aola, former NFL running back
- James Fenderson, former pro football player
- Mark Foo, surfer
- Kynan Forney, former pro football player
- Greg Garcia, MLB infielder
- Keith Gilbertson, college and pro football coach
- Alex Green, former NFL running back
- Ron Hall, former NFL tight end
- Tom Henderson, former pro basketball player
- Ivanelle Hoe, swimmer
- Wayne Hunter, former NFL offensive tackle
- June Jones, former pro football player and coach
- Natasha Kai, USA women's soccer team
- Scott Karl, former pro baseball player
- Kani Kauahi, former NFL/CFL center and pro football assistant coach
- Adrian Klemm, former NFL offensive lineman
- Travis LaBoy, former NFL defensive end
- Ashley Lelie, former NFL wide receiver
- Vince Manuwai, former NFL offensive lineman
- Reagan Maui'a, former pro football player
- Mat McBriar, former pro football player
- Dana McLemore, former pro football player
- Rich Miano, former pro football player, current University of Hawaii coach
- Jim Mills, former pro football player
- Chad Mock, former pro football player
- Jeff Monken (1991), college football coach
- Tyson Nam, professional MMA fighter
- Bob Nash, former pro basketball player and UH basketball coach
- Ashley Nee,* Olympic slalom canoeist
- Ken Niumatalolo, current head football coach at the United States Naval Academy
- Kaulana Noa, former pro football player
- Al Noga, former pro football player
- Joe Onosai, World's Strongest Man competitor
- Chad Owens, former pro football player
- Leonard Peters, former pro football player
- Gavin Petersen, college basketball coach
- Kealoha Pilares, former pro football player
- Golden Richards, former pro football player
- Dan Robinson, former pro football player
- Red Rocha, former NBA player and UH basketball coach
- Nick Rolovich, former AFL quarterback and former UH football coach
- Trevor Ruffin, former NBA point guard
- Jesse Sapolu, former pro football player
- Samson Satele, former pro football player
- Predrag Savović, former NBA point guard
- Jerry Scanlan, former NFL offensive tackle
- Henry Schichtle, former football player
- Colin Scotts, former pro football player
- Bobby Singh, former NFL and CFL offensive lineman
- Paul Sironen, former Australian former professional rugby league footballer
- Isaac Sopoaga, former pro football player
- Jay Spurgeon, former MLB baseball player
- Clay Stanley, USA volleyball Olympian
- Maa Tanuvasa, former NFL defensive lineman
- Pisa Tinoisamoa, former pro football player
- Mark Tuinei, former pro football player
- Jeff Ulbrich, former pro football player
- Aaron Valdes (born 1993), basketball player in the Israeli Basketball Premier League
- Dominic Waters (born 1986), basketball player in the Israel Basketball Premier League
- Jeris White, former pro football player
- Kim Willoughby, USA indoor volleyball Olympian
- Kean Wong, Major League Baseball player for the San Francisco Giants
- Kolten Wong, MLB infielder and first-round draft pick
- Steven Wright, MLB pitcher

== Business ==
- Darren Kimura (B.A. 1997), inventor and businessman
- Richard D. Parsons (1968, B.A. history), former CEO and chairman of Time Warner, Inc.

== Government and international service ==
- Neil Abercrombie (M.A. sociology, Ph.D. American studies), former governor of Hawaii
- Duke Aiona, former lieutenant governor of Hawaii
- Daniel K. Akaka (B.A. education, M.Ed.), former U.S. senator
- Eileen Anderson, former mayor of Honolulu
- Rick Blangiardi, 15h mayor of Honolulu and former television executive
- Patrick DeLeon, former chief of staff for Senator Daniel Inouye; former president of the American Psychological Association
- Tammy Duckworth (1990, B.A. political science), decorated war veteran, U.S. senator
- Ann Dunham (1967 B.A., 1983 M.A., 1992 Ph.D. anthropology), mother of U.S. President Barack Obama
- Hiram Fong, former U.S. senator
- John Moffat Fugui (Ph.D.), minister for the Environment and Climate Change
- Thomas Gill*, former lieutenant governor of Hawaii
- Colleen Hanabusa (1973, B.A.; 1975, M.A.; 1977, J.D.), U.S. representative
- Clayton Hee (1975), politician
- Mazie Hirono (1970, B.A. psychology), U.S. senator
- Natalia Hussey-Burdick (2016, B.A. biology), member-elect of the Hawaii House of Representatives
- David Ige, governor of Hawaii
- Daniel Inouye (1950, B.A. political science), former U.S. senator
- Khara Jabola-Carolus (J.D.), executive director of the Hawaii State Commission on the Status of Women
- Jason Jones (B.A. 1998 Political Science), activist and filmmaker
- Jong-wook Lee, director-general of the World Health Organization
- Kimberlyn King-Hinds (M.A., J.D.), U.S. congressional delegate
- Spark Matsunaga, former U.S. senator
- Sabrina McKenna (B.A. Japanese, J.D.), judge
- Patsy Mink, former U.S. representative, author of Title IX Amendment of the Higher Education Act
- John Mizuno, former vice speaker of the Hawaii House of Representatives
- Florence T. Nakakuni, former U.S. attorney for the District of Hawaii
- Kuniwo Nakamura, former president of Palau
- Barack Obama Sr. (1962, B.A. economics), father of U.S. President Barack Obama
- Mike Parson, governor of Missouri
- Kathryn Relang, former executive director of Women United Together Marshall Islands
- Emais Roberts, Palauan politician and physician
- Pat Saiki, former U.S. representative
- Mark Takai (1991, M.P.H., 1989, B.A. political science), former U.S. representative
- Cynthia Thielen, Hawaii state representative
- Ariana Tibon-Kilma, Marshallese nuclear justice activist
- John D. Waihee III (J.D.), former governor of Hawaii
- Liu Xiaobo, Chinese dissident, 2010 Nobel Peace Prize winner
- Leland Yee (1975, Ph.D. child psychology), California state senator
- Yoshiko Sakurai, Japanese politician, and historical revisionist
- Nadao Yoshinaga, Hawaii senator

== See also ==
- List of University of Hawaii faculty
