= List of University of Hawaii faculty =

This article lists notable faculty of the University of Hawaiʻi. Faculty who are also alumni are listed in bold font, with degree and year in parentheses.

- Maqsudul Alam, did the first genome sequencing of jute, rubber & papaya; director of Genomics, Proteomics and Bioinformatics programs
- Barbara Watson Andaya, scholar of history in Southeast Asia
- Leonard Andaya, scholar of history in Southeast Asia
- Koji Ariyoshi, newspaper editor and political activist; one of the Hawaii 7
- Asa Baber, writer
- Georg von Békésy, 1961 Nobel laureate in Physiology or Medicine
- Derek Bickerton, linguist
- Allyn Bromley, artist
- Kenneth Wayne Bushnell, visual artist
- Glenn Cannon, actor
- Hampton L. Carson, biologist
- Wing-tsit Chan, philosopher
- Irving Copi, philosopher
- Alice G. Dewey, anthropologist
- Milton Diamond, sex researcher
- Leon Edel, author
- Nina Etkin, ethnobotanist
- Ben Finney (M.A. 1959), professor of anthropology; co-founder of the Polynesian Voyaging Society
- Kevin Fitzgerald, former adjunct professor; celebrity veterinarian
- Mary Jo Freshley, dancer
- Helen Gilbert, artist
- Louis Herman, cetacean researcher
- David Ho, founder of the Bamboo Bike Project
- Hope Jahren, geochemistry, geobiology
- Reece Jones, geographer, Guggenheim Fellow
- Lee Jong-Wook, director-general of the WHO
- Jeff Kuhn, physicist and astronomer
- Ralph Simpson Kuykendall, history professor
- John Madey, physicist
- William Meredith, poet
- Rick Mills, professor and director of the glass art program
- Gary Pak, writer, editor and professor of English
- W. Wesley Peterson, 1999 Japan Prize winner for Information Technologies
- R.J. Rummel, political scientist, democratic-peace theoretician
- Shawna Yang Ryan, English professor
- Susan Schultz, English professor
- Michael J. Shapiro, political philosopher
- William Allison Shimer, philosophy professor, first editor of The American Scholar literary journal
- Maya Soetoro-Ng, professor/teacher
- Steven M. Stanley, paleontologist and evolutionary biologist
- Stephen Vargo, professor of marketing
- Thornton Wilder, author (visiting professor)
- Ryuzo Yanagimachi, geneticist
- Tseng Yu-ho, artist, art historian

== See also ==
- List of University of Hawaii alumni
