= Jarvin =

Jarvin may refer to:

- Steve Jarvin, Australian sailor
- Jarvin Skeete (born 1981), Saint former Lucian footballer

== See also ==
- Jervin Benjamin (born 1994), Dominican cricketer
- Gervin (surname)
- Gervin Miyamoto, US Marshal for the District of Hawaii (2010–2017)
- Gervin, half of the Power Duo, a Filipino dance duo
