= Allan Bromley =

Allan Bromley may refer to:

- D. Allan Bromley (1926–2005), Canadian-American physicist
- Allan G. Bromley (1947–2002), Australian historian of computing

== See also ==
- Allyn Bromley (born 1928), American artist and art educator
