= Charles W. Watson =

American sculptor

Charles Wyndham Watson (August 30, 1915 in Guelph, Ontario, Canada – April 20, 2002 in Kaneohe, Hawaii), was an American sculptor. After working as an apprentice carpenter during the Great Depression, Watson studied engineering briefly at Santa Monica College. He came to Hawaii after World War II as a manager for McNeil Construction. In 1950, he moved to Hawaiian Dredging Construction Company as a general superintendent and worked his way up to become president. His son Mark Watson is also a Hawaii-based sculptor.

His body of work included both figurative subjects and large abstract works, such as Tree in Foster Botanical Garden. His sculptures in public places include:

- To the Nth Power, 1971, University of Hawaii at Manoa, Honolulu, Hawaii
- Pueo, 1980, Kaimuki High School, Honolulu, Hawaii
- Ka Mea Kuʻi ʻUpena, 1989, intersection of South King Street & Kapiolani Boulevard, Honolulu, Hawaii
- Giraffe (1959) and Ostrich (1960), Honolulu Zoo, Honolulu, Hawaii
- Hawaiian with ʻO ʻO, 1978, Hawaiian Dredging & Construction Company, 614 Kapahulu Avenue, Honolulu, Hawaii
- Mahiole (Feathered helmet), 1983, pair of stone sculptures, The Halekulani Hotel, Honolulu, Hawaii
- Tree, 1974, Foster Botanical Garden, Honolulu, Hawaii
