= Kapiʻolani Park =

Public park in Hawaii

Coordinates: 21.267°N 157.819°W

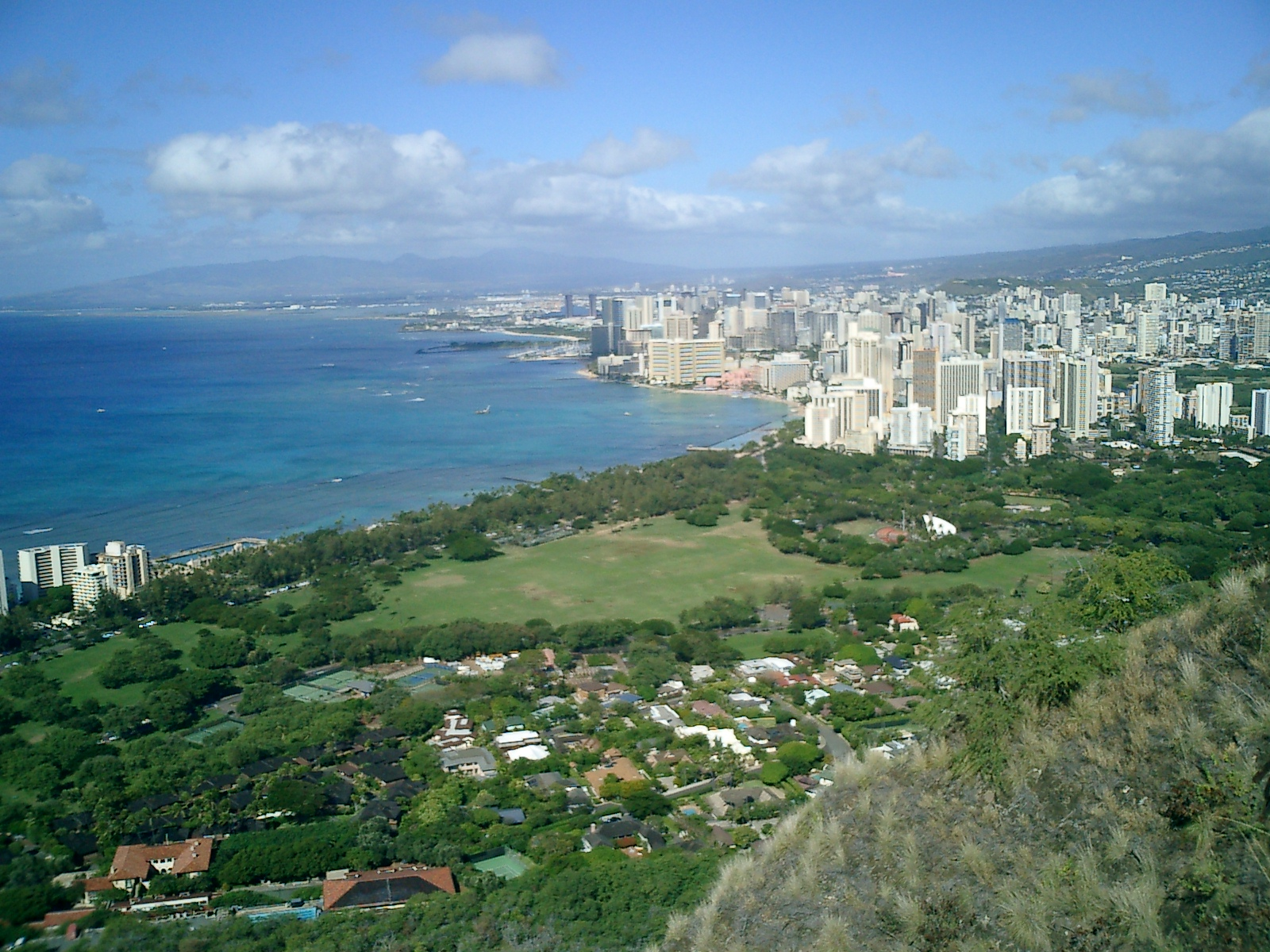
An aerial view of the park in 2006

Queen Kapiʻolani Regional Park is the largest and second-oldest public park in Hawaii, located in Honolulu on the east end of Waikiki just beyond Kuhio Beach Park and the Waikiki residential neighborhood. The 300-acre (1.2 km^{2}) park, named after Queen Kapiʻolani, the queen consort of King David Kalākaua, is home to the Waikiki Shell and the Honolulu Zoo.

== History ==
=== Kingdom of Hawaii ===
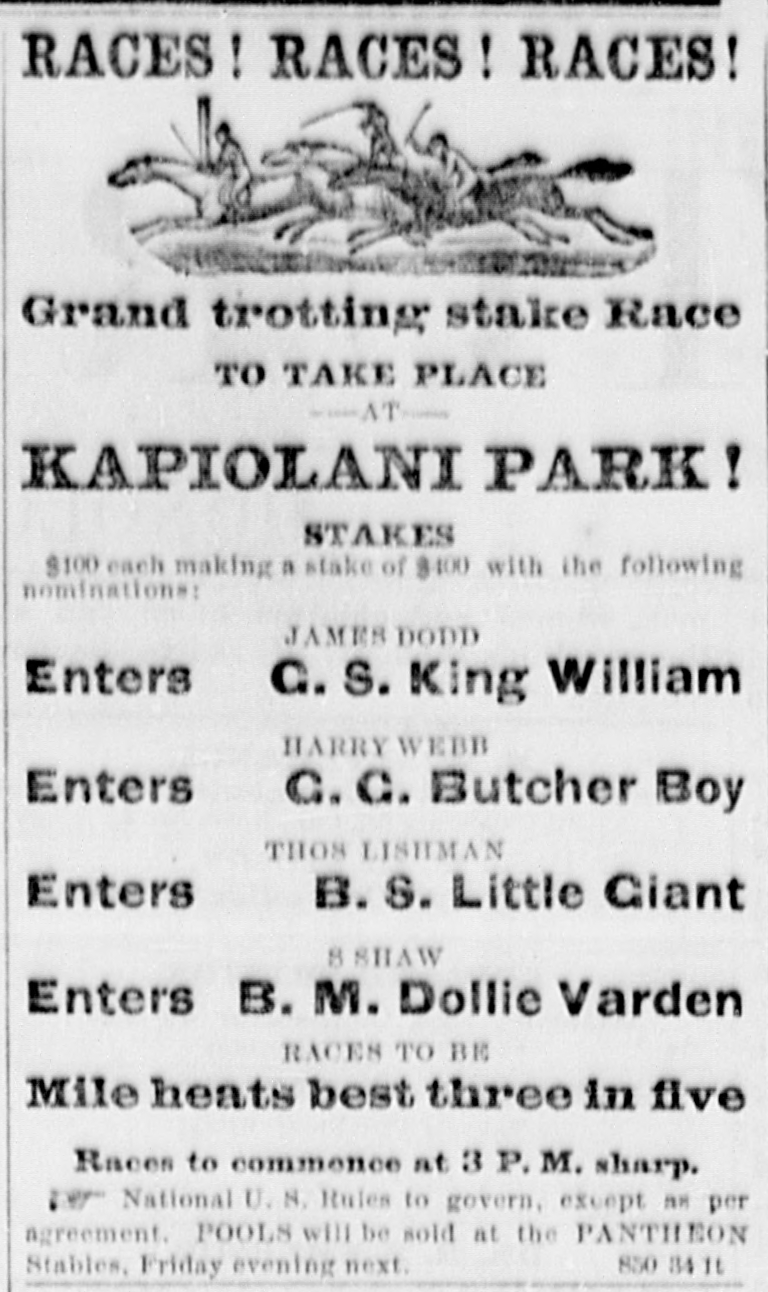
An ad announcing a horse race in Kapiʻolani Park

In the 1870s, King Kalākaua was asked to find a permanent, dry course for horse racing. Since Waikiki was popular with wealthy racing fans, Kalākaua chose the unoccupied and dry plain at the foot of Diamond Head where the park now stands. On June 11, 1877, the park was dedicated as Hawaii's second public park, after Thomas Square. Scotsman Archibald Scott Cleghorn was vice president and later president of the Kapiʻolani Park Association, a group of businessmen who convinced Kalākaua to give them a 30-year lease for $1 per year. A share in the association cost $50, and allowed shareholders to lease property on Waikiki Beach. By the 1880s, many of Hawaii's wealthiest citizens had leased property through the association until the overthrow of the Kingdom of Hawaii, during which most of the properties were returned to the city or condemned. A lease was granted to the Honolulu Cricket Club in 1893. Top cricket players from San Francisco's California Cricket Association played for local teams.

=== Republic of Hawaii ===
After the overthrow, the land was conveyed to the Republic of Hawaii and managed by the Honolulu Park Commission. The legislation provided that the park be set aside permanently as a free public park and recreation ground, forbade the sale or lease of land in the park, and prohibited charging of any entrance fees. Since 1913, the park has been maintained by the City and County of Honolulu's Department of Parks & Recreation.

In the 1920s, plans to drain the Ala Wai Canal through Kapiʻolani Park filled the park with mud and rubbish. It was rarely used until 1952, when it was renovated and its current boundaries were established.

=== Description ===
Kapiʻolani Park Banyan Trees

Besides the Honolulu Zoo and the Waikiki Shell, the park includes tennis and basketball courts, soccer, baseball, lacrosse and rugby fields and an archery range. The park hosts many international lacrosse and rugby tournaments a year. The Waikiki Shell, with 2,400 seats and space for an additional 6,000 in lawn seating, serves as an entertainment venue. The park is also a popular course for joggers who utilize its two-mile (3 km) circumference. The park also serves as both the starting and finish lines of road races in Honolulu, including the Honolulu Marathon.

Kapiʻolani park is also home to Honolulu Cricket Club, the only cricket club in the Hawaiian Islands. Founded in 1893, it is the oldest sporting club in the Pacific according to Guinness World Records.

As Kapiʻolani Park continues south, it becomes Kapiʻolani Beach Park, adjacent to Kuhio Beach and Waikiki Beach. The park serves as a natural border between Waikiki and Diamond Head neighborhood.

On April 17, 2024, a private plane made an emergency landing in the park after an engine failure. Nobody was hurt.
