= Dietrich Varez =

American artist (1939–2018)

Dietrich Varez

Dietrich Varez (28 March 1939 – 14 August 2018) was an iconoclastic printmaker-painter. His work is among the most widely recognized of any artist in Hawaii. A long-time resident of the Big Island, he is known primarily for scenes of Hawaiian mythology and of traditional Hawaiian life and stylized designs from nature.

== Early life ==
Varez was born in Berlin, Germany, at the start of World War II. His father was Friedrich Donat, an architect and engineer of Lithuanian heritage, whom Varez has said was a Nazi who worked on military construction. His mother, Ursula, was a Polish-Swedish translator of English. As the war ended, Varez's father left his family to fend for themselves and he went into hiding from occupation forces, a period Varez has said was "pure misery". Ursula divorced Donat in 1947. In 1948, she married U.S. Army Sgt. Manuel Varez, who adopted her sons, Dietrich and Christian, and brought the family to his home in Oahu, Hawaii. Dietrich graduated from President Theodore Roosevelt High School in Honolulu and from the University of Hawaii with a degree in English. He enlisted in the U.S. Army in 1962, earning the rank of second lieutenant, and then served in the Army Reserves in Honolulu while earning a master's degree in English at the University of Hawaii. He married Linda Denneberg, a native of California who had come to Hawaii as a competitive surfer and stayed to become an artist, in 1965. Varez, with his wife and recently born son, moved to the Big Island in 1968 after purchasing a 9-acre (36,000 m^{2}) property near Kilauea Volcano, sight unseen. For several years, the family lived in cabins at the Hawaii Volcano National Park, or in a tent on their land, supported by Varez's groundskeeping job at a nearby golf course or as a bartender for the Volcano House, the 1877 lodge in the National Park overlooking the caldera of Kilauea Volcano. He supplemented his earnings by carving firewood scraps with the image of Pele, Goddess of the volcano, which he sold at the bar, and later he made woodblock prints, mostly giving them away but selling some in the lodge gift shop. In 1974, the nonprofit Volcano Art Center opened, providing increased visibility for his work. Varez prints became increasingly popular, eventually allowing Varez to earn a living as an artist.

== Art ==
Varez has published more than 225 wood- and linoleum-block prints. The subject matter in most of Varez's work is inspired by traditional Hawaiian legends, integrating mythological figures in scenes with flora and fauna typical of the diverse Hawaiian environment. His work is informed by graphic interpretations of traditional Polynesian designs, as seen, for instance, in Hawaiian quilts, and is especially rich in imagery from the Hawaiian rainforest. However, Varez has stated that he actively avoids other art that might influence the unmediated nature of his vision. His recent graphic work has branched out to include more modern stories, notably that of Father Damien, known for his work in the leper colony on Molokai, and also the renowned battleship USS Missouri (BB-63), berthed at Pearl Harbor, the U.S. Naval base on Oahu. His work is widely known through books that he has illustrated, and, in some cases, written, including:

- Lehua: A Legend of Old Hawaii (Island Heritage Publishers)
- Hina the Goddess (Petroglyph Press, Hilo)
- Pele and Hi'iaka, A Tale of Two Sisters (Petroglyph Press, Hilo)
- Pele: The Fire Goddess with Pua Kanaka'Ole Kanahele (Bishop Museum Press)
- Maui the Demigod, by Steven Goldsberry (Bishop Museum Press)
- Maui: The Mischief Maker with Lilikala Kame Eleihiwa (Bishop Museum Press)
- The Water of Life—A Jungian Journey Through Hawaiian Myth with Rita Knipe
- Hawaiian-Japanese Dictionary (Nishizawa)
- Kamapua'a, by John Charlot
- 'Olelo No'eau: Hawaiian Proverbs & Poetical Sayings, by Mary Kawena Pukui
- The Legend of La'ieikawai with Martha Warren Beckwith
- The Law of the Splintered Paddle: Kanawai Mamalahoe by Carol Chang
- A Pocket Guide to the Hawaiian Language by Albert J. Schutz

Varez has also adapted prints to fabric for a line of Hawaiian shirts with clothing maker Reyn Spooner, and he has also painted in oils on a limited basis.

== Lifestyle ==
The studio where Varez works and lives is in a rural forested area near the small town of Volcano, Hawaii a few miles from the entrance to Hawaii Volcanoes National Park. He built the house himself after many years of living in tents or cabins on the land or in the Park. For most of his life there, he and his family have lived a self-sufficient pioneering life. They capture rainwater for their needs, and had no electricity for thirty years. The road to his home has been described as "barely passable". Varez and his wife rarely leave their homestead, virtually never travelling off-island.

== Unconventional approach to life and business ==
Varez, as a self-taught artist whose career developed outside framework of the institutional art world, maintains a strict policy of keeping prices low and distributing directly to the widest audience. This is consistent with his earliest practice of giving away prints, and only then, when demand required it, of charging nominal prices to cover his expenses. It was only after several years of a growing reputation that he decided to make his living from the sale of his work, and he has expressed in interviews a deep ambivalence toward being considered a professional artist.

"Some people have told me that until I start charging more, I'm never going to become a 'known artist.' I think that's nonsense. You either like the print or you don't, and that shouldn't have anything to do with the price. My goal is to make art – at least my art – available to common people. I don't give a damn about the art people; I want to get it into your mom's house and my mom's house".

Contrary to the usual practice among printmakers, he refuses to limit his editions, printing until a block is exhausted. He dates his prints according to when the print was struck, not, as is customary, when the block was carved. These individualistic practices may have limited the value of his work to collectors, but Varez has said he is committed to staying outside the artificial boundaries of art world conventions. "The printmaking business needs some new blood and new traditions", he has been quoted as saying.
