= Honolulu Zoo =

Zoo in Honolulu, Hawaiʻi, United States

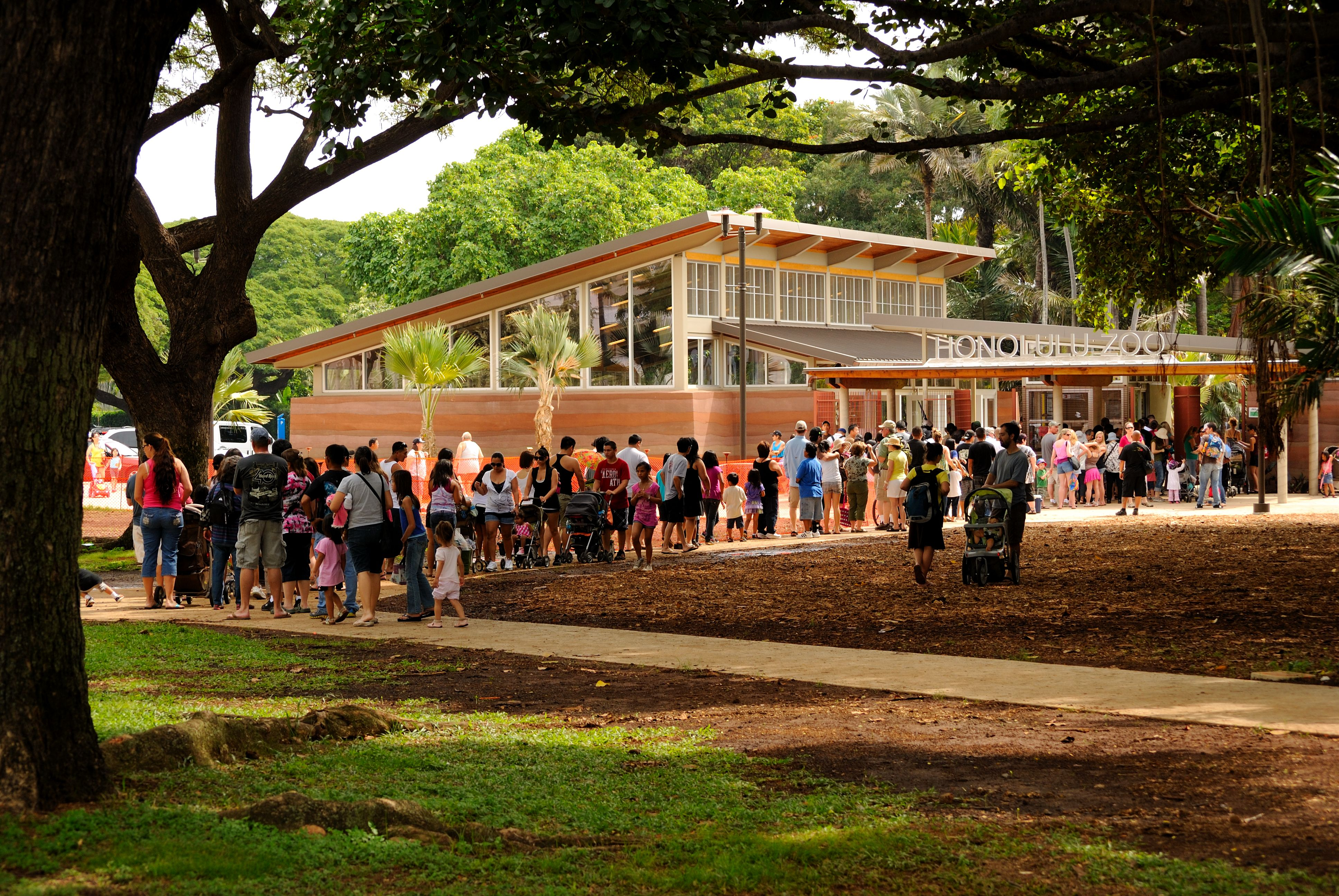
- Main Entrance
- Interactive map of Honolulu Zoo
- 21.2709°N 157.8192°W
- Location: Honolulu, Hawaiʻi, United States
- Land area: 42 acres (17 ha)
- No. of animals: 1,230
- Annual visitors: 750,000+
- Memberships: Association of Zoos and Aquariums
- Public transit: TheBus: W
- Website: honoluluzoo.org

The Honolulu Zoo is a 42-acre (17 ha) zoo in Queen Kapiʻolani Park in Honolulu, Hawaiʻi. It is the only zoo in the United States to be established by grants made by a sovereign monarch and is built on part of the 300-acre (121 ha) royal Queen Kapiʻolani Park. The Honolulu Zoo features over 1,230 animals in specially designed habitats.

Over 750,000 people visit the zoo annually. The zoo is administered by the City & County of Honolulu through the Department of Enterprise Services. Its support agency, the Honolulu Zoo Society (HZS), provides program services for the zoo. The zoo's accredited membership of the Association of Zoos and Aquariums (AZA) was dropped in 2016 but reinstated in 2020.

== History ==
=== Queen Kapi‘olani Park ===
In 1876, King Kalākaua made royal lands near the slopes of Lē‘ahi available for the establishment of a grand public park for the people of his kingdom. Two hundred subscribers to the king's project formed the Kapiʻolani Park Association for the purpose of pursuing the mission. In 1877, the marshes, ponds and lagoons in the area were beautified, and it was opened as Queen Kapiʻolani Park in honor of Queen Kapiʻolani, wife of Kalākaua.

Even as a public park, King Kalākaua continued using the park as a place for his personal collection of exotic birds and horses. The park brought more exotic animals as it staged the Kamehameha Day celebrations and various carnivals and fairs. In 1896, the City & County of Honolulu assumed control of Queen Kapiʻolani Park.

=== Honolulu Zoo ===
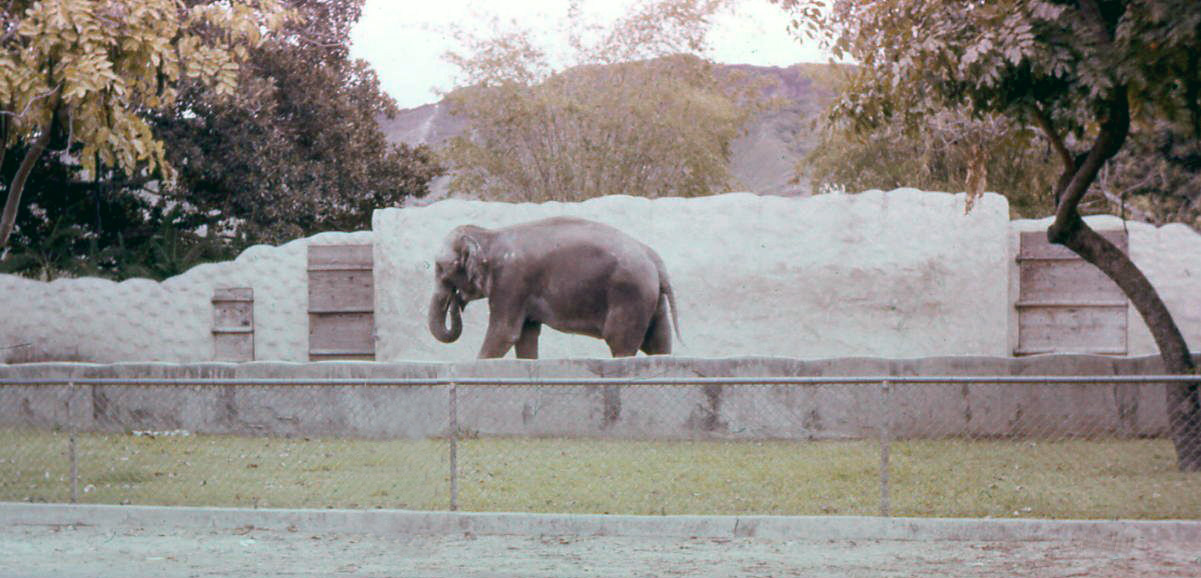
View of part of the elephant exhibit in 1958

In 1915, the City & County of Honolulu appointed Ben Hollinger to be its Administrator of Parks and Recreation, and Queen Kapiʻolani Park came under his control. Hollinger maintained a fascination with animals and began collecting them to showcase at the park in Waikīkī. The park became home for a monkey, a sun bear and several lion cubs. In 1916, a steamship on its way from Australia to Canada pulled into port at Honolulu Harbor. On board was an African elephant named Daisy. Hollinger pleaded with the City & County of Honolulu to purchase the elephant, which they did. With the acquisition of the elephant, from live animal trader Ellis S. Joseph, Honolulu officially had a zoo. Daisy entertained visitors at the park until 1933, when Daisy was killed by Honolulu Police Department officers after she trampled her trainer, George Conradt, to death.

During the Great Depression, the Honolulu Zoo was almost shut down for lack of finances. Even through the difficulty, it expanded its collection on November 29, 1949, with the purchase of an elephant, a Bactrian camel, sea lions, several bird species, spider monkeys and a tortoise. The Honolulu Zoo continued to operate in disrepair.

In 1974, the Honolulu Zoo accepted a donation of a camel, an elephant, chimpanzees and deer. These donations renewed Honolulu's enthusiasm to revive their zoo. The City & County of Honolulu approved a master plan that determined the boundaries of the present 42-acre (17 ha) site at the north end of Queen Kapiʻolani Park. The animal collection, increased by purchase, trade and donations, was housed in newly constructed facilities, some of which still provide foundations for newer exhibits. The facility designs were influenced by the exhibits of the San Diego Zoo in California.

The Honolulu Zoo experienced another revival of enthusiasm in the 1990s as the exhibits were redesigned to feature more natural settings for the animals on display.

The Zoo launched a new online digital ticketing system in November 2025.

== Art ==
Art throughout the Honolulu Zoo includes:

- Giraffe, a 1959 metal sculpture by Charles W. Watson
- Ostrich, a 1960 metal sculpture by Charles W. Watson, no longer exists.
- Hawaiian Porpoises, a 1976 metal, fiberglass, and coral sculpture by Ken Shutt
- Hippopotami, a 1976 chicken wire, cloth, and Belzona resin sculpture by Jack Throp
- Elephant's Child, a 1988 bronze sculpture by Tom Tischler
- Gecko's Delight, a 1978 wood relief sculpture by John Nippolt
- Hawaiian Pigs, a 1976 stone sculpture by Gregory Clurman
- Giraffe, a 1998 fiberglass sculpture by Jim de la Torre
- Whooping Cranes, a pair of 1998 metal sculptures by Paul Saviskas
- Maasai Tribesman, a 1999 metal sculpture by Paul Saviskas
- The Evolution of an Island, a 1991 metal mural by Amanda Opsahl

== Conservation ==
The zoo has worked on conserving native Hawaiian species while also working with other organizations focused on conservation. Conservation has included the Kamehameha butterfly, crocodile monitor lizards, birds-of-paradise, African wild dogs, sloths, and the nene, which is the state bird of Hawaii. When only one Amastra cylindrica snail was found in the wild in 2015, the zoo worked on bringing the numbers of the snail up with over 140 snails reintroduced into the wild.

== Gallery ==
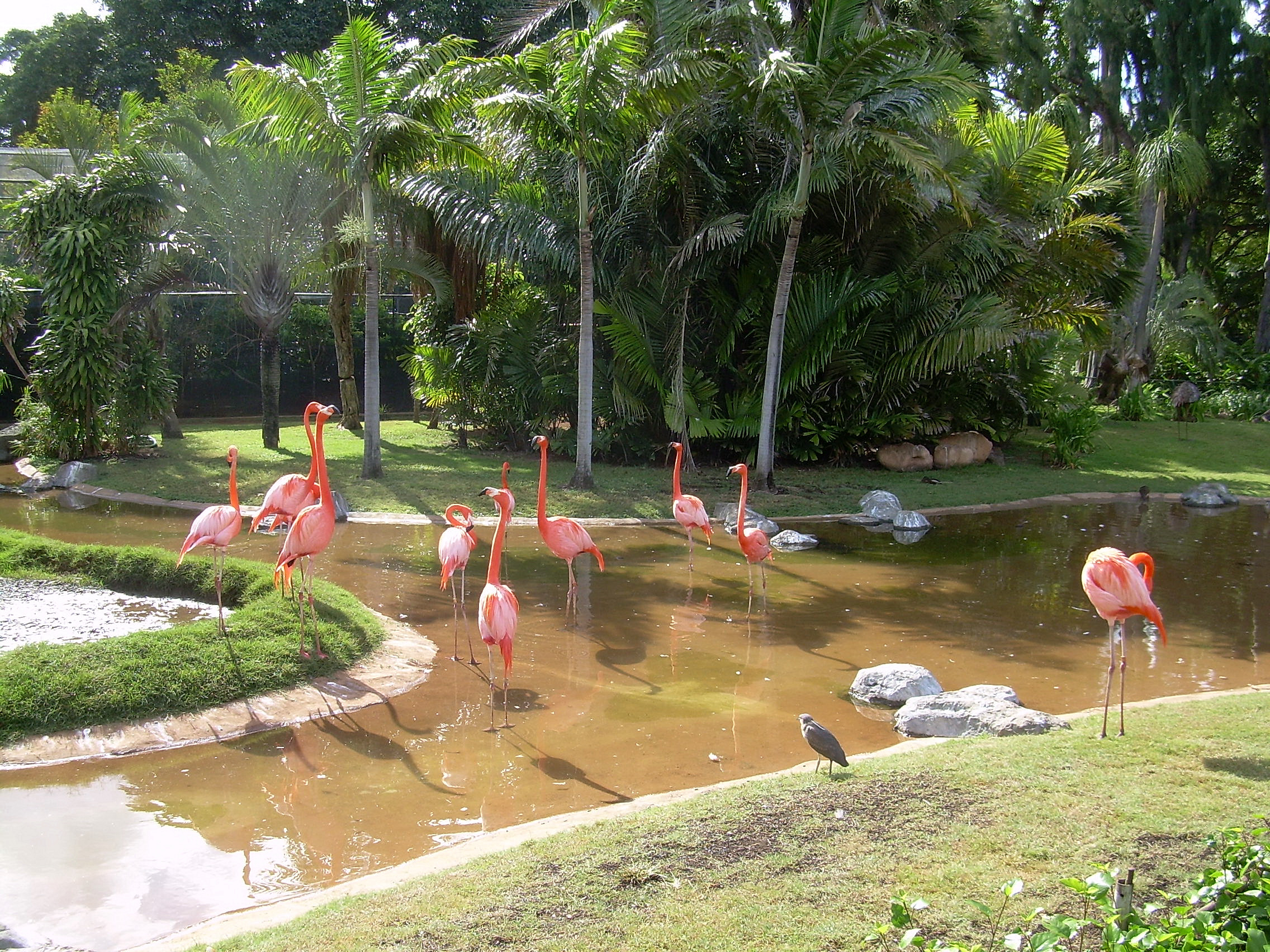
American flamingos featured at the entrance to the zoo

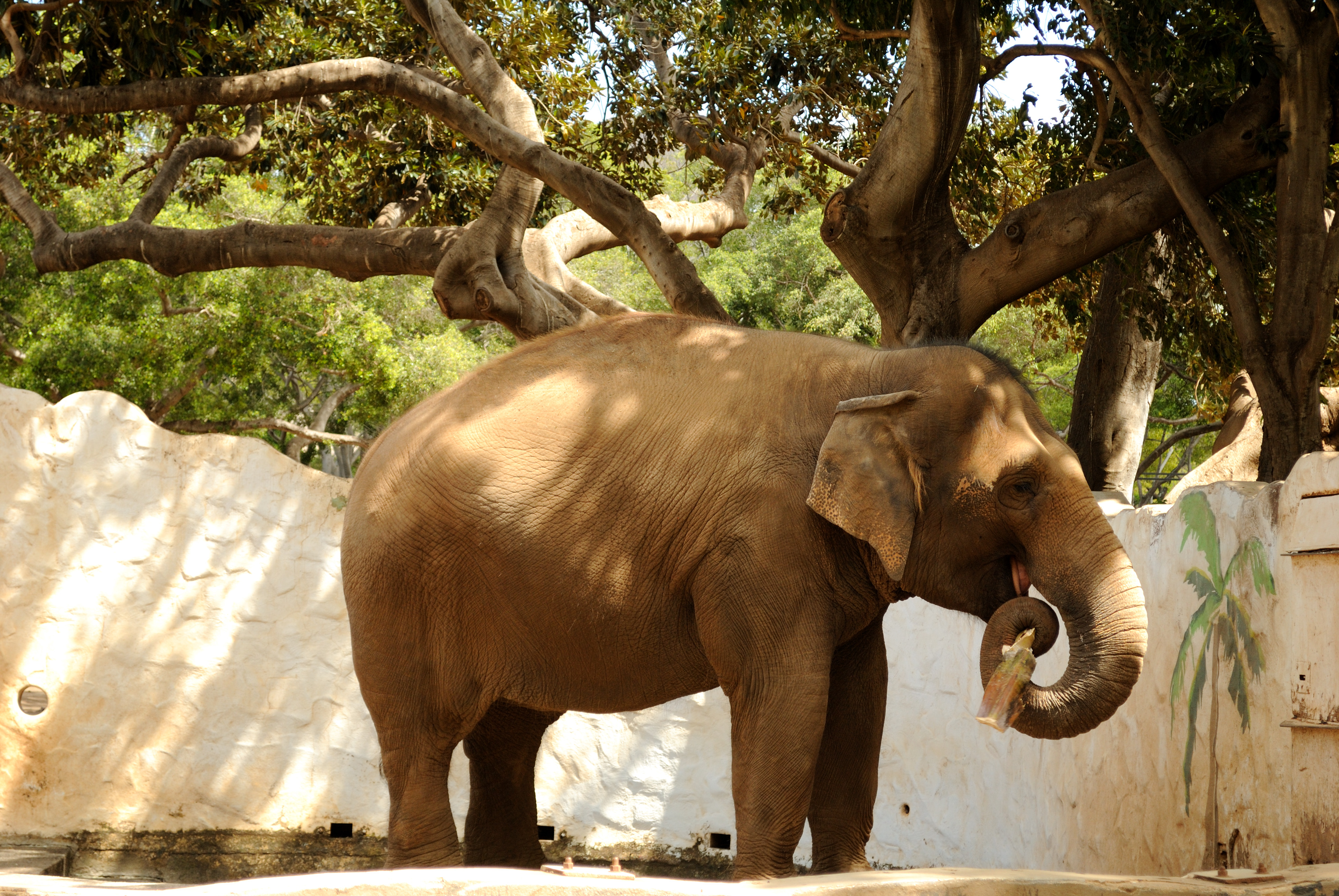
Asian elephant (Elephas maximus)

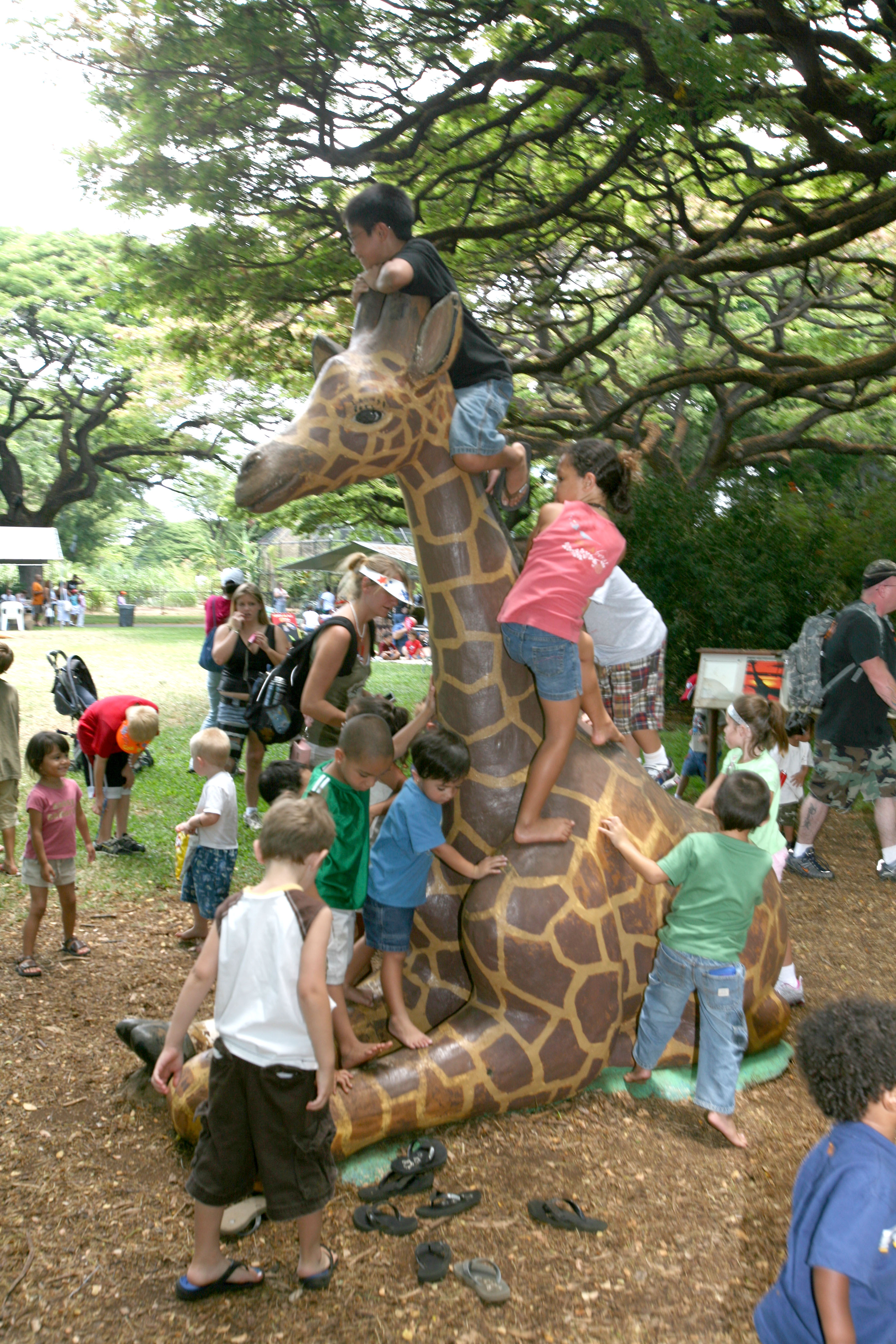
Children playing on a giraffe statue at the zoo

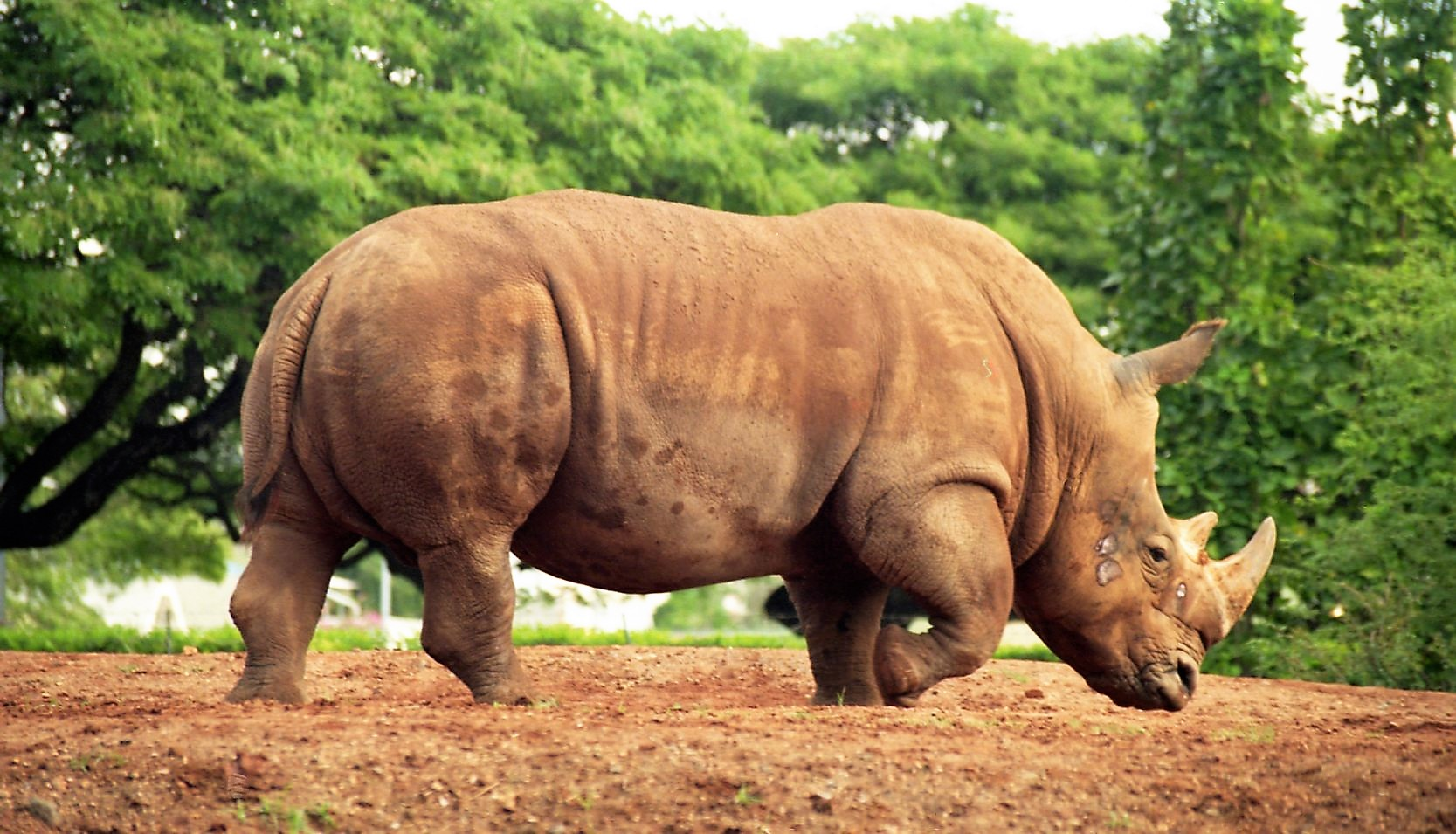
Southern white rhinoceros (Ceratotherium simum simum)

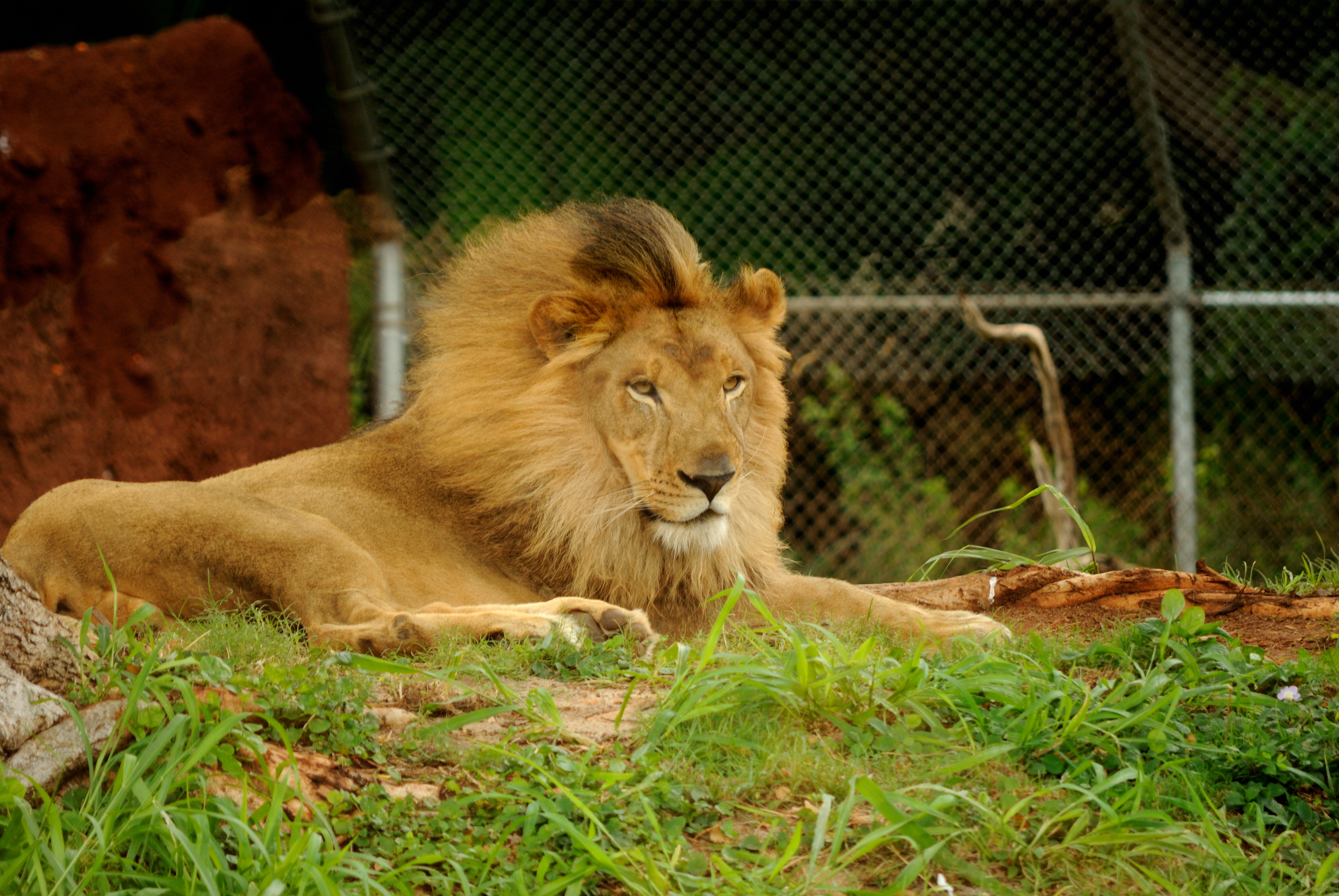
Lion

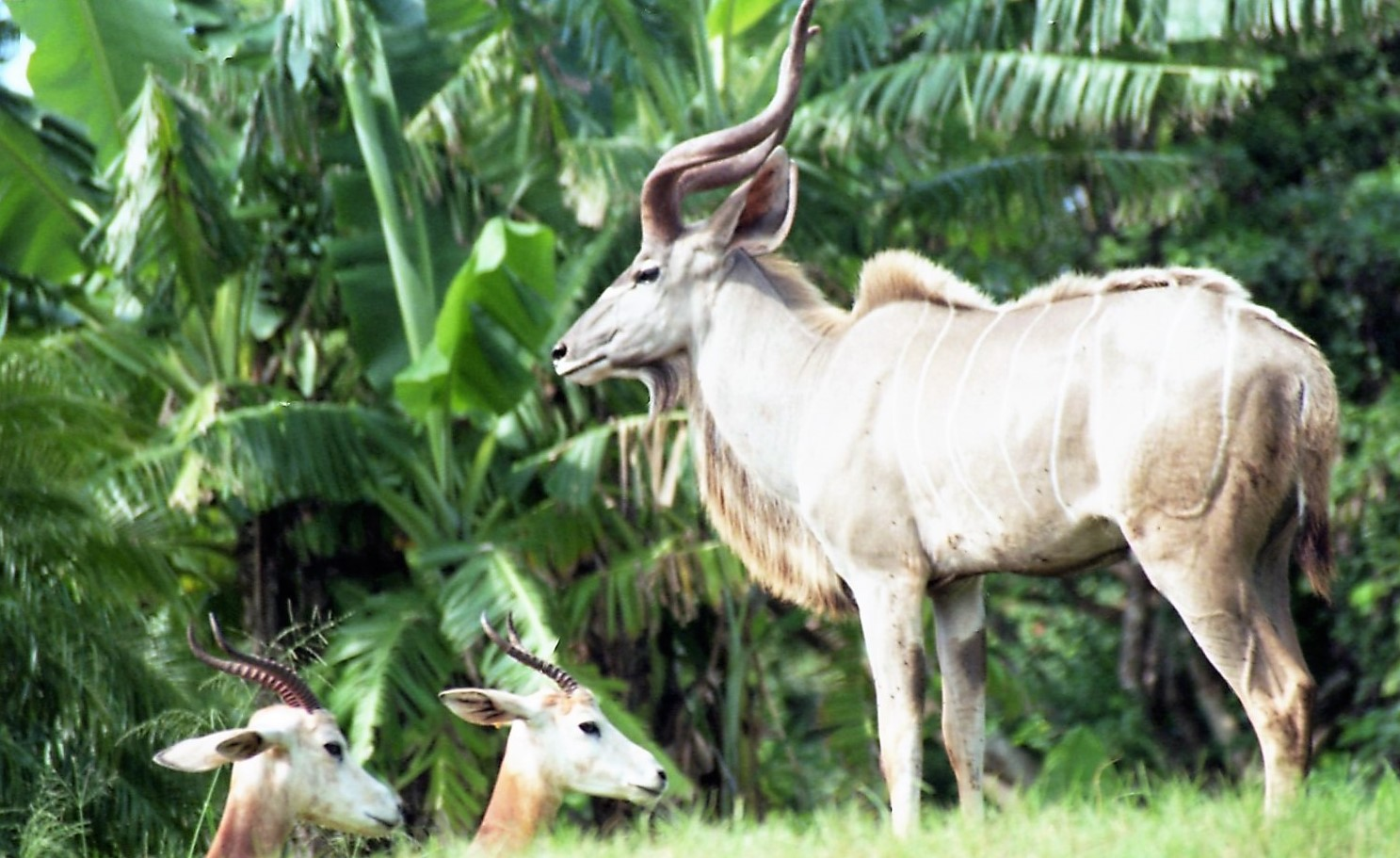
Greater kudu (Tragelaphus strepsiceros)

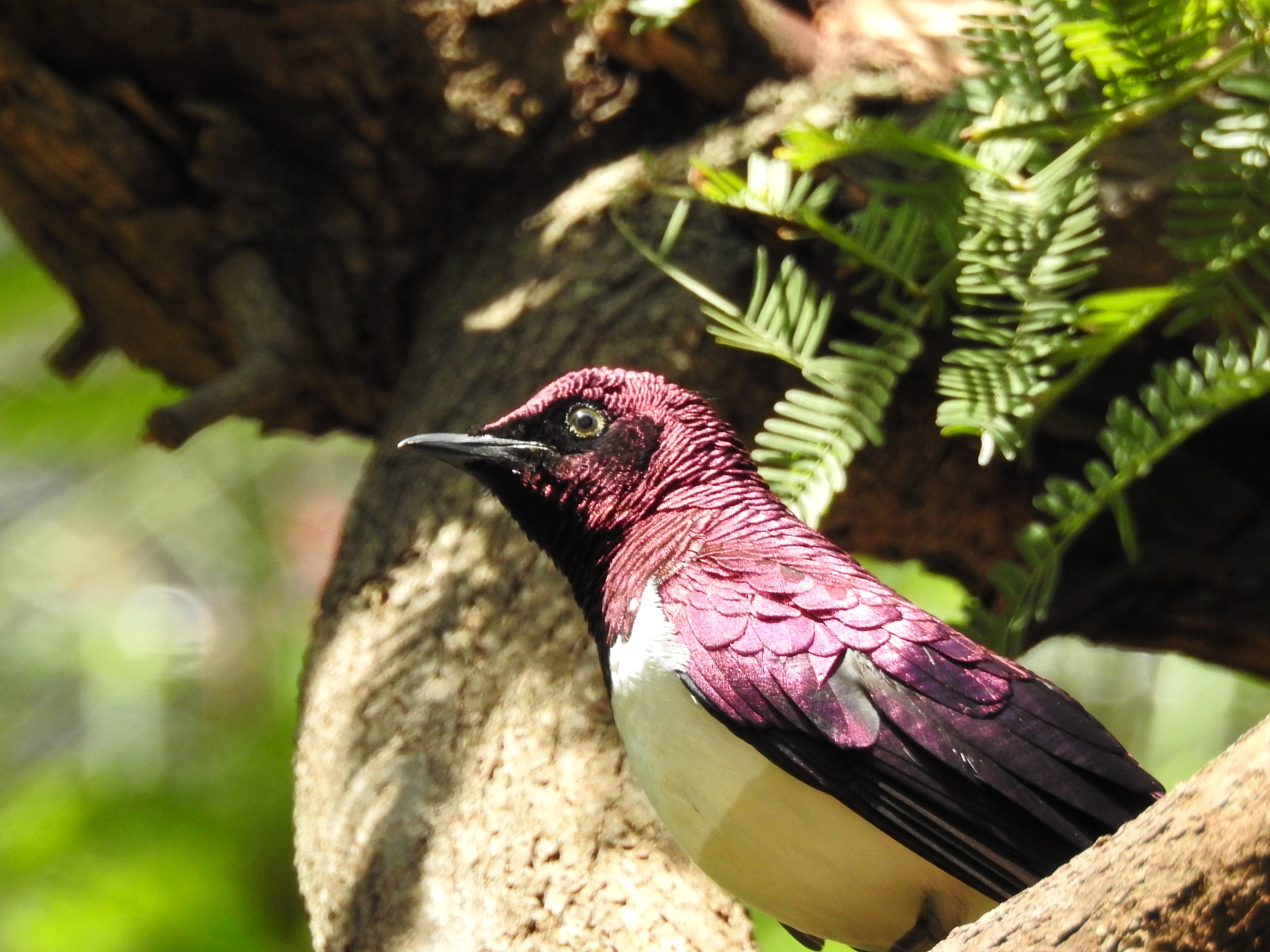
Violet-backed starling (Cinnyricinclus leucogaster)

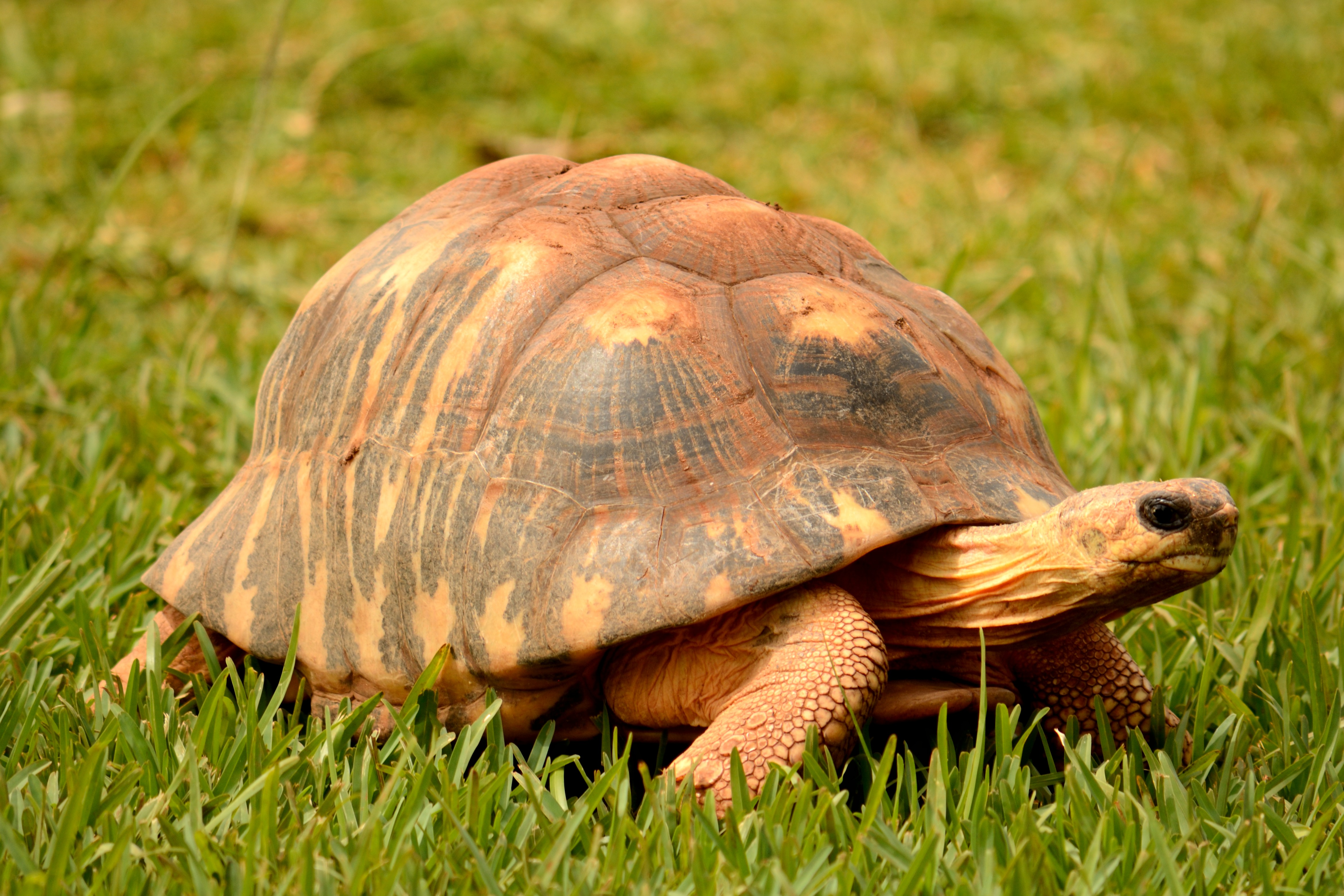
Radiated tortoise (Astrochelys radiata)

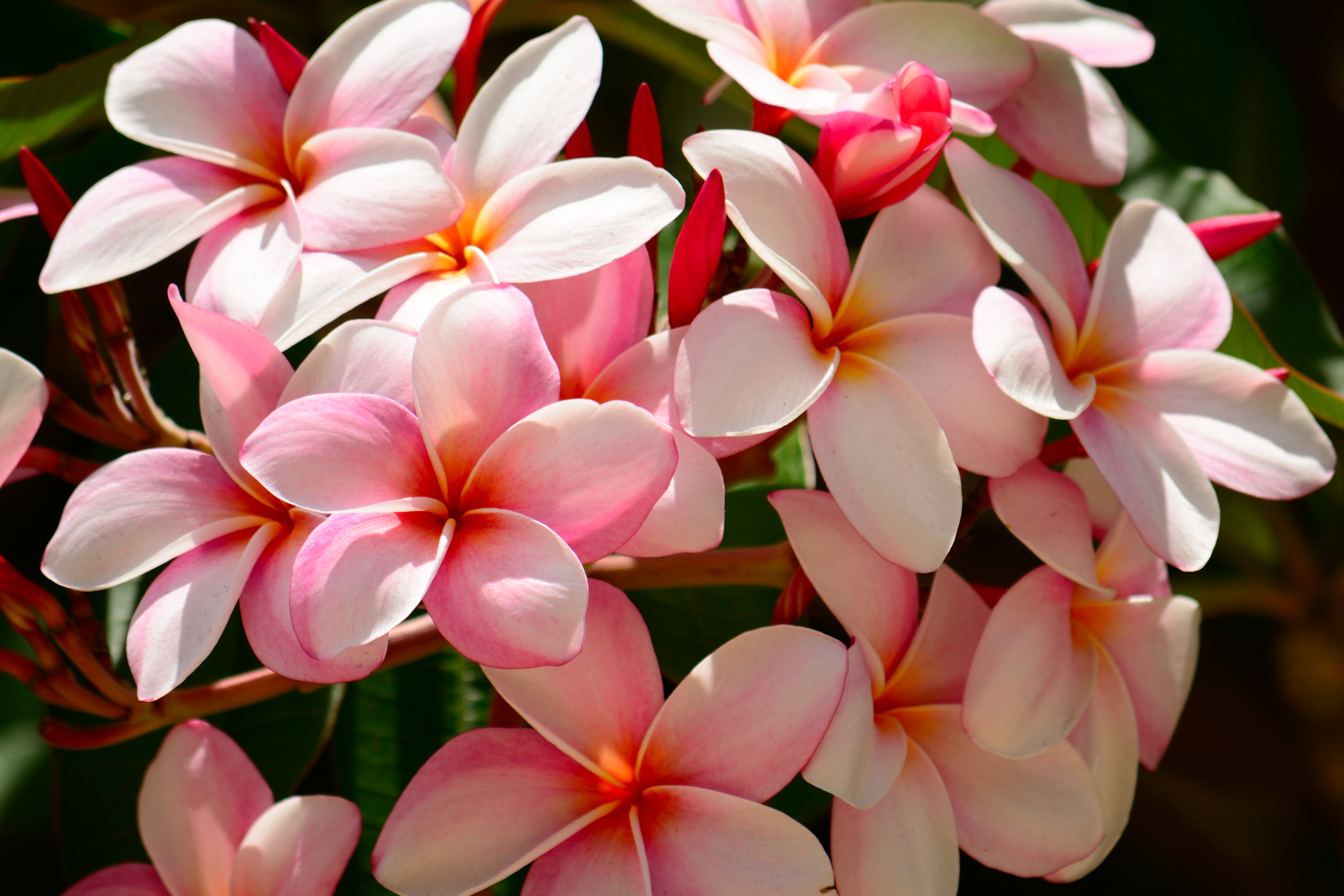
One of the many flowering plants at the zoo
