= Gustav Ecke =

American art historian

Gustav Emil Wilhelm Ecke (13 June 1896 – 17 December 1971) was a German and later American historian of art and curator. He is best known for his book Chinese Domestic Furniture, first published in wartime China in 1944. The book presented the aesthetic of a neglected art form for scholars and connoisseurs and described the techniques of construction for cabinet-makers. It was the first book in any language on Chinese classic hardwood furniture.

== Biography ==
Ecke was born in Bonn, Germany, a center of German Expressionism and Russian Constructivism and made lively by refugees from their home countries. His father, also Gustav Ecke (1855–1920) was a professor of theology at Bonn University.

He had a PhD from Erlangen University (now University of Erlangen–Nuremberg). Ecke wrote his doctoral thesis on French Surrealism in 1922.

Ecke accepted an offer to be professor of European philosophy at University of Amoy in Fujian in 1923, then after five years moved to Tsinghua University in Beijing. In a brief return to Paris to conduct research, the prospects of fascism daunted him and he returned to China. He taught at Fujen University (Catholic University) and was a researcher at the National Institute of Architecture, both in Beijing. He was one of the founding editors of the scholarly journal Monumenta Serica.

In 1945, he married the artist and scholar Tseng Yu-ho, who had been one of his students. The couple left China for Hawai'i in 1949. He was curator of Asian art at the Honolulu Academy of Arts (now Honolulu Museum of Art), until he died in 1971.

== Scholarly career ==
Soon after arriving in China in the early 1920s, Ecke turned his attention to China's architectural history. Since there were few surviving wooden structures, he initially photographed and recorded stone buildings in Fujian, where he then taught. After moving to Beijing, he researched as many stone pagodas as he could find in nearby Hebei and Shandong before the outbreak of war in 1937. His book Twin Pagodas of Zayton, published by the Harvard-Yenching Institute in 1935, and articles in Monumenta Serica, presented some but by no means all of his findings.

In Beijing he joined a group of foreign residents, such as George Kates, Laurence Sickman, and the German photographer Hedda Morrison, who were the first to collect and catalog classic Chinese furniture. Few Chinese scholars had done research on the subject and Chinese collectors showed interest only in ornate carved and lacquered pieces. The hard times of the 1920s and 1930s forced many families to sell their finest pieces, and many were lost or even burned for fuel. Ecke and Sickman walked or rode by donkey through many parts of China in search of architecture and furniture. Ecke's taste had been shaped by the Bauhaus movement in the Germany of his youth and its call for utilitarian beauty. One historian of art notes that he was "naturally attracted to the minimally decorated geometric forms and subtle beauty of what has become known as Ming-style furniture or classical Chinese furniture," that is, hardwood pieces in the "Ming-style," not necessarily furniture made in the Ming dynasty. These foreign scholars wrote the first books on what came to be known as Chinese "classic furniture."

Ecke faced significant problems preparing his research in wartime. There were few reference works to rely on, little money for research assistance, travel was dangerous, and printing resources few. Ecke took apart and measured the furniture in his own collection to give detailed drawings of its construction. Photographs, some full-page, and drawings by Ecke's collaborator Professor Yang Yue, show the construction of beds, chairs, tables, wardrobes, wash stands, clothes racks and other domestic items. Chinese Domestic Furniture in Photographs and Measured Drawings was published in a limited portfolio edition of 200 copies in Beijing in 1944, then reprinted as a standard book by Tuttle in 1962 and Dover Publications in 1985. Kirkus Review The book was influential in its choice of topic and manner of treatment. The classical style of furniture came to dominate the tastes of American collectors after the war partly because of this Bauhaus influence which Ecke and other scholars trained in Europe conveyed.

Ecke's final book, Chinese Painting in Hawai'i, written with his wife, said one scholar, was far more than a catalog of the museums holdings, but what another reviewer called a "monumental work" and in itself an "introduction to the study of Chinese painting."

In 1991, the First International Symposium on Chinese Ming Domestic Furniture was held in Beijing in Ecke's memory.

== Publications ==
- Ecke, Gustav (1944). Chinese domestic furniture. Peking: H. Vetch.
- Ecke, Gustav (1962). Chinese domestic furniture. Rutland, Vt: C.E.Tuttle Co. ISBN 978-080480098-3.
- Ecke, Gustav (1965). Chinese painting in Hawaii, in the Honolulu Academy of Arts and in private collections. Honolulu: University Academy of Arts.
- Ecke, Gustav (1986). Chinese domestic furniture in photographs and measured drawings. New York: Dover Publications. ISBN 978-048625171-4.
- Ecke, Gustav and Paul Demiéville (1935). The twin pagodas of Zayton; a study of later Buddhist sculpture in China. Cambridge, MA: Harvard University Press.

== See also ==
- Liang Sicheng

== Sources ==
- Handler, Sarah (2001). Austere luminosity of Chinese classical furniture. Berkeley: University of California Press. ISBN 978-052021484-2.
- Jaquillard, Pierre (1972). "In Memoriam: Gustav Ecke 1896-1971". Artibus Asiae (in French). 34 (2/3): 114–118. JSTOR 3249643.
- Tseng, Yuho Ecke (November 1991). "Gustav Ecke". Orientations. Vol. 22, no. 11. p. 68.
- Wisnosky, John; Klobe, Tom (2002). A Tradition of Excellence. Honolulu: University of Hawai'i. pp. 50–53.
