= Leslie Swindale =

New Zealand soil scientist (1928–2022)

- Born: Leslie Denis Swindale; 16 March 1928; Wellington, New Zealand
- Died: 25 September 2022 (aged 94); Honolulu, Hawaii
- Occupation(s): Soil scientist Agriculturalist
- Spouse: Delle Sprinza Natelson
- Children: Two sons and a daughter
- Parent(s): Ernest Swindale; Anne Walder
- Awards: Padma Bhushan

Leslie Denis Swindale (16 March 1928 – 25 September 2022) was a New Zealand-born soil scientist, agriculturist, writer and a former chairman of the Department Agronomy and Soil Science of the University of Hawaii. He was the author of several books on soil and agricultural sciences and was a part of the Freedom from Hunger Campaign of the Food and Agriculture Organization. He was a Fellow of New Zealand Institute of Chemistry, American Society of Agronomy and a foreign fellow of the National Academy of Agricultural Sciences. The Government of India awarded him the third highest civilian honour of the Padma Bhushan, in 1991, for his contributions to science, making him one of the few non-Indians to receive the award.

== Biography ==
Swindale was born to Anne Walder and Ernest Swindale on 16 March 1928 in Wellington. He completed his graduate (1948) and master's (1950) degrees at Victoria University, Wellington before securing a doctoral degree from the University of Wisconsin in 1955. He started his career as a physical chemist at the New Zealand Soil Bureau and held several notable positions which included Director of New Zealand Pottery and Ceramics Research Association, Lower Hutt (1960–1963), Professor and chairman of department of agronomy and soil science at the University of Hawaii (1963–1968), Chief of Soil Resources Development and Consultant with the Food and Agriculture Organization (1968–1970), Associate director of Hawaii Agricultural Experimental Station, Honolulu (1970–1976), Director General of the International Crops Research Institute for the Semi-Arid Tropics, Patancheru, India (1977–1989) before becoming the Chairman of the Consultative Group on International Agricultural Research at Patancheru (1989–1990) He was the author of several books on soil and agricultural sciences and was a part of the Freedom from Hunger Campaign of the Food and Agriculture Organization. He is a Fellow of New Zealand Institute of Chemistry, American Society of Agronomy and the National Academy of Agricultural Sciences and a member of institutions and societies such as Society for International Development, Soil Science Society of America, International Union of Soil Sciences, New Zealand Society of Soil Science, Royal Society of New Zealand, New Zealand Geological Society, Indian Society of Soil Science, Clay Mineral Society of India and Gamma Sigma Delta. In 1991, he became one of among the few foreign nationals to be honored by the Government of India, when he was selected for the third highest civilian honour of the Padma Bhushan, for his contributions to science.

Swindale was married to Delle Sprinza Natelson and the couple had two sons and a daughter.

He died at his home in Honolulu on 25 September 2022, aged 94.

== Selected bibliography ==
- Leslie Denis Swindale (1955). Mineralogy and Genesis of Some Rhyolite Derived Soils of New Zealand. University of Wisconsin—Madison.
- David Kear; B. C. Waterhouse; Leslie Denis Swindale (1961). Bauxite deposits in Northland. New Zealand Dept. of Scientific and Industrial Research.
- Leslie Denis Swindale (1966). A Mineralogical Study of Soils Derived from Basic and Ultrabasic Rocks in New Zealand. Government Printer.
- George Donald Sherman; Leslie Denis Swindale (1966). Laboratory Formation and Characterization of Taranakite in a Hydrol Humic Latosol Soil from Hawaii.
- Leslie Denis Swindale; I. R. Hughes (1968). Hydrothermal Association of Pyrophyllite, Kaolinite, Diaspore, Dickite and Quartz in the Coromandel Area, New Zealand. New Zealand Pottery and Ceramics Research Association.
- Samir Aly El-Swaify; Leslie Denis Swindale; Goro Uehara Office of Saline Water, University of Hawaii (Honolulu) (1969). Salinity tolerances of certain tropical soils and relationships between sodium ion activities and soil physical properties. U.S. Dept. of the Interior.
- Anastacio Laida Palafox; Clinton Y. Kawanishi; Ernest K. Akamine, Henry Alver Bess, I. A. E. Atkinson, Minoru Awada, Timothy MacDonald, James L. Brewbaker, Leslie Denis Swindale, Robert H. Suehisa, Theodore Goo (1975). Isoenzyme Polymorphism in Flowering Plants: Tissue and Substrate Specificities, and Responses to Chemical Inhibitors. The isoesterases of maize. V. Hawaii Agricultural Experiment Station, University of Hawaii.
- Anastacio Laida Palafox; Clinton Y. Kawanishi; Ernest K. Akamine; I-Pai Wu; I. A. E. Atkinson; Minoru Awada; Timothy MacDonald; Charles Robert Long; Harris M. Gitlin; James L. Brewbaker; Leslie Denis Swindale; Robert H. Suehisa; Theodore Goo (1975). Critical Phosphorus Level in Petioles of Papaya. Hawaii Agricultural Experiment Station, University of Hawaii.

== See also ==
- Consultative Group on International Agricultural Research
- International Crops Research Institute for the Semi-Arid Tropics
- List of University of Wisconsin–Madison people
- List of University of Hawaii alumni
