= Waikiki Shell =

Hawaiian concert venue in Honolulu

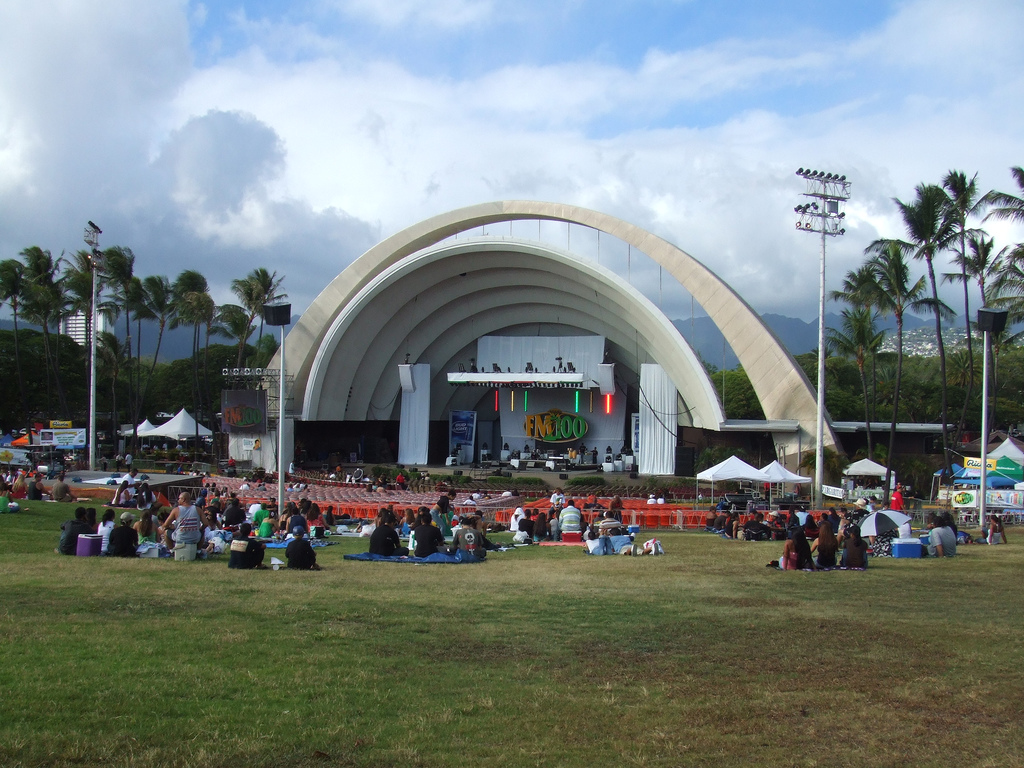
- Waikiki Shell
- Interactive map of Waikiki Shell
- Location: Kapiolani Park, Honolulu, HI
- Coordinates: 21.2682°N 157.8184°W
- Owner: City and County of Honolulu
- Capacity: 2,400 (seats) + 6,000 (lawn)

Construction
- Opened: 1956

Website
- Waikiki Shell Web Site

The Tom Moffatt Waikiki Shell is a venue for outdoor concerts and other large gatherings in the Waikiki area of Honolulu, Hawaii. Built in 1956, the Tom Moffatt Waikiki Shell seats 2,400 persons and the lawn area has capacity for an additional 6,000 persons. It is under the management of the Neal S. Blaisdell Center. It has been compared to the Hollywood Bowl.

The venue is located in Kapiolani Park in Waikiki, between the dense high-rises of the neighborhood and the dormant tuff cone volcano, Diamond Head.

Despite its relatively small seating capacity compared to other major concert venues such as the Hollywood Bowl, the Waikiki Shell has hosted a variety of major acts and performers, both Hawaiian and international stars. These include Frank Sinatra (1960), Jimi Hendrix (1969), Neil Diamond (1970), José Feliciano (1972), Jackson Browne and Joni Mitchell (1972), Cat Stevens (1974), The Eagles (1975), Richie Havens (1975), Earth, Wind & Fire (1975), Marvin Gaye (1979), America (1983), Hall & Oates (1984), The Beach Boys (1986), James Taylor (1986), Crosby, Stills & Nash (1988), Miles Davis (1989), Bob Dylan (1992), Santana (1993), Willie Nelson (1996), Sheryl Crow (1999), Roberta Flack (2000), Jimmy Buffett (2004), Jack Johnson (2014), and Lana Del Rey (2018), among others.

In 2018 the venue was renamed "The Tom Moffatt Waikiki Shell", in memory of Hawaii's first rock DJ, later a concert promoter. Moffatt died in 2016.

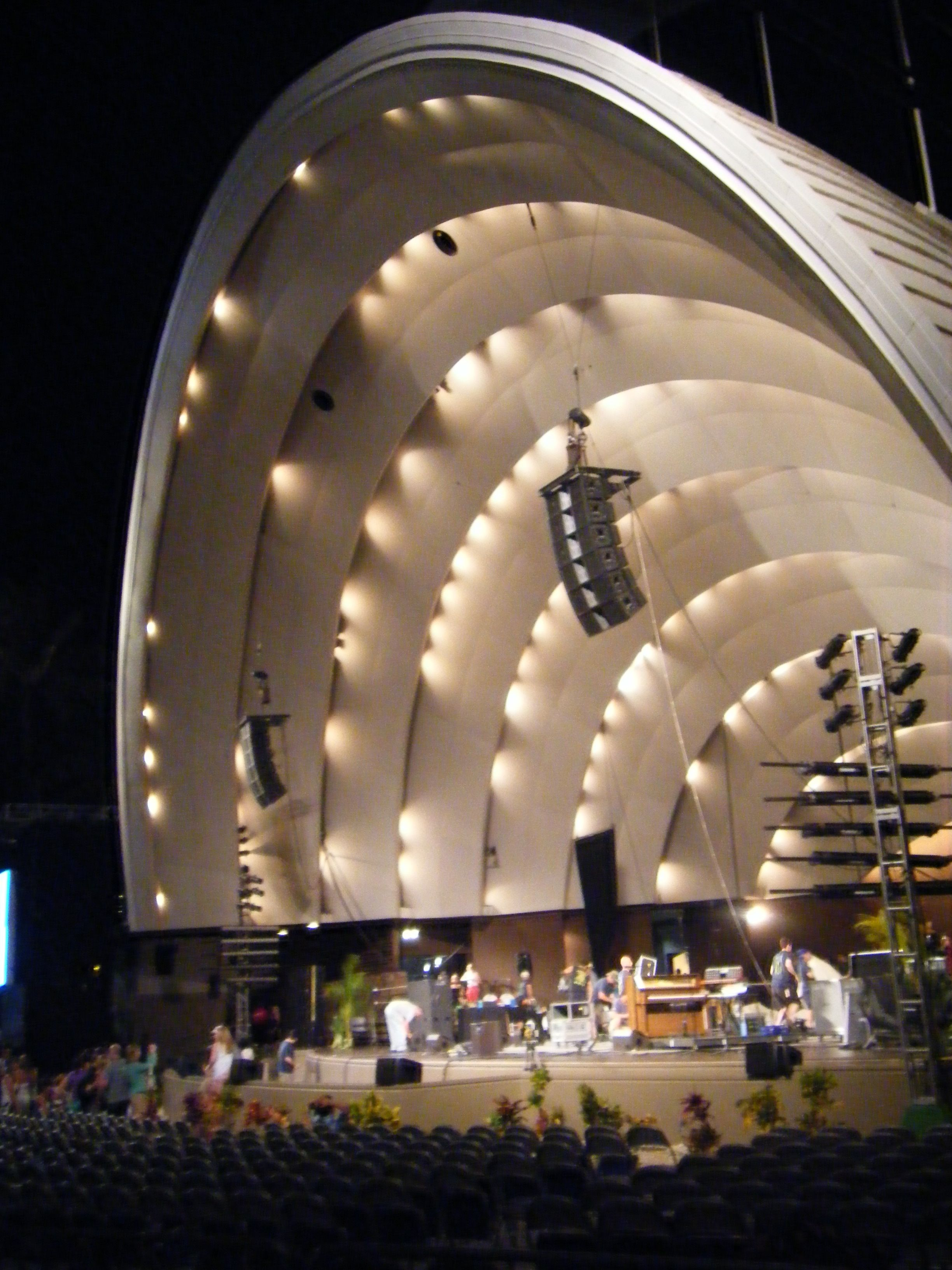

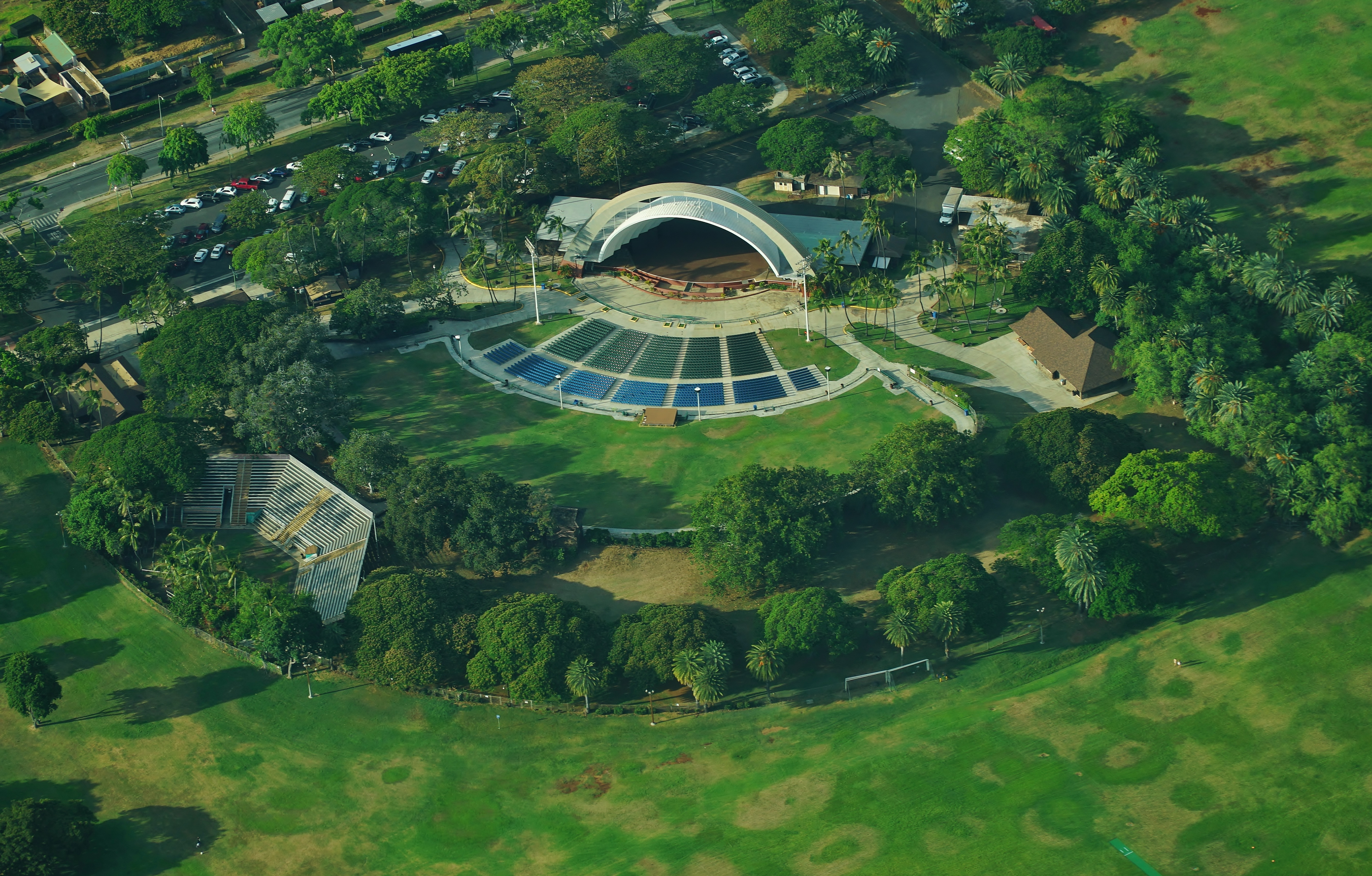
Waikiki Shell Amphitheater

== See also ==
- List of contemporary amphitheatres
