= Andrew T. F. Ing =

American politician

3rd Lieutenant Governor of Hawaii
- In office April 13, 1966 – December 2, 1966
- Governor: John A. Burns
- Preceded by: William S. Richardson
- Succeeded by: Thomas Gill

Personal details
- Born: February 15, 1920 Honolulu, Hawaii, U.S.
- Died: March 6, 1999 (aged 79) Kahului, Hawaii, U.S.
- Party: Democratic
- Spouse: Patricia Wai Hoon Ing
- Children: 2
- Education: University of Hawaiʻi at Mānoa; Harvard Business School

Andrew Tut Fo Ing (February 15, 1920 – March 6, 1999) was an American politician and the third lieutenant governor of Hawaii in the administration of Governor John A. Burns. Ing was a member of the Hawaii Democratic Party.

== Early years ==
After graduating from Roosevelt High School and the University of Hawaiʻi at Mānoa, Ing earned his master's in business administration from Harvard Business School. Ing served in World War II from 1943 to 1945 as an Army liaison supply officer and was recalled in 1951, rising to the rank of lieutenant colonel.

== Lieutenant governor ==
Ing served as state budget and finance director from 1962 to 1966. When Lieutenant Governor William S. Richardson resigned to become chief justice of the Hawaii Supreme Court, Ing was appointed and took office on April 13, 1966, until the term ended on December 2, 1966.

== Later career ==
After serving as lieutenant governor, Ing returned to his post as state budget and finance director. In 1969, Ing stepped down to work for Hawaii Electric Light Co.

Ing died on March 6, 1999, at the age of 79 at Maui Memorial Hospital.

Political offices
Preceded by William S. Richardson	Lieutenant Governor of Hawaii; 1966	Succeeded by Thomas Gill
