= Mark Watson (sculptor) =

American sculptor

Hoʻokahi (To Make as One), Hawaiian basalt stone sculpture by Mark Watson, 2001, President Theodore Roosevelt High School, Honolulu, Hawaii

Mark Watson is an American sculptor who was born in Honolulu, Hawaii in 1949. His father Charles W. Watson is also a Hawaii-based sculptor. Watson's sculptures in public places include:

- Mai Ka Mea Hana Ka ʻIke (From Tools, Comes Knowledge), 1988, Kapiʻolani Community College Honolulu, Hawaii
- Na Aliʻi, 1992, Lahaina Intermediate School, Lahaina, Hawaii
- Hoʻokahi (To Make as One), 2001, President Theodore Roosevelt High School, Honolulu, Hawaii
