= William Bains-Jordan =

American politician (1916–2021)

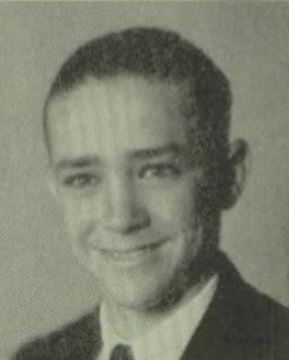

Member of the Hawaii House of Representatives from the 10th district
- In office 1959–1962
- Preceded by: Multi-member district
- Succeeded by: Multi-member district

Personal details
- Born: William Harry Bains-Jordan; December 12, 1916 Hilo, Hawaii, U.S.
- Died: February 4, 2021 (aged 104) Madison, Alabama, U.S.
- Party: Republican
- Spouse: Marjorie Helen Marques
- Children: 3
- Education: University of Hawaiʻi

William Harry Bains-Jordan (December 12, 1916 – February 4, 2021) was an American politician who served in the Hawaii House of Representatives from the 10th district from 1959 to 1962, as a member of the Republican Party. He was an active member of the Boy Scouts of America and United States Junior Chamber.

Bains-Jordan was born in Hilo, Hawaii, and was educated at President Theodore Roosevelt High School. He later attended the Cannon School of Business and the University of Hawaiʻi. During the 1930s and 1940s, he was active in the Boy Scouts of America (BSA) and United States Junior Chamber. He achieved the rank of Eagle Scout in the BSA, attended the first National Scout jamboree, and became a district committeeman in the organization. He served in many positions in the Honolulu Junior Chamber before becoming the organization's president. He was in leadership positions over two state fairs.

He entered politics his selection as vice-chair of the Fifth District of the Young Republicans of Hawaii in 1952, and served on the platform committee as the 1956 Hawaii Republican Party territorial convention. He was elected to the state house as the only Republican from the 10th district, but lost reelection in the 1962 election.

== Early life ==
William Harry Bains-Jordan was born in Hilo, Hawaii, on December 12, 1916, to Jack Bains and Jean Bains-Jordan. He graduated from Roosevelt High School in 1935, and attended the Cannon School of Business and the University of Hawaiʻi. Samuel Wilder King, Hawaii's delegate to the United States House of Representatives, selected Bains-Jordan as an alternate candidate to an appointment to the United States Naval Academy. He married Marjorie Helen Marques, with whom he had three children, on November 14, 1941.

== Career ==
=== Organizations ===
He was an Eagle Scout. Bains-Jordan attended the first National Scout jamboree alongside forty-seven other members of Boy Scout Troop 10. He was selected to serve as chair of the 1938 Boy Scouts Makahiki by general chair Charles Crane. He served as district committeeman of the Boy Scouts for two years.

Bains-Jordan joined the Honolulu United States Junior Chamber in 1945, served as a director for multiple years, was selected to serve as treasurer in 1947, elected as second vice-president in 1948, and later became first vice-president. In 1951, he was selected to replace Arthur W. Campbell as president of the Junior Chamber. He served as vice-chair of the 48th state fair and as chair of the 49th state fair.

Bains-Jordan was selected as vice-chair of the Fifth District of the Young Republicans of Hawaii in 1952. Bains-Jordan served on the platform committee at the 1956 Hawaii Republican Party territorial convention.

=== Hawaii House of Representatives ===
==== Elections ====
Henry Haina, the chairman of the Young Republican Federation of Hawaii's candidates committee, listed Bains-Jordan as a possible candidate for a seat in the Hawaii House of Representatives from the 10th district alongside George Richardson, H.C. Penhallow, Daniel K. Kamalani, and Thomas Soga. He filed to run for one of four seats in the 10th district as a Republican in 1959. He was the Republican with the most support in the primary election and was the only Republican elected in the general election alongside Democratic nominees Larry Kuriyama, Donald Ching, and George M. Okano.

On August 14, 1962, he announced that he would seek reelection instead of seeking election to the Hawaii Senate from the 5th district. He was the Republican with the most support in the primary election, but lost in the general election becoming one of four incumbents in the state house to lose reelection with all being Republicans.

==== Tenure ====
Bains-Jordan was appointed to serve on the Accounts, Agriculture, Economic Development, Judiciary, and Tourism committees. During his tenure he served as the chair of the committee that designed the Hawaii State Capitol during which he visited the state capitols of Arizona, Georgia, Louisiana, Nebraska, New Mexico, North Carolina, Oregon, and Texas.

== Later life ==
Bains-Jordan was considered a possible successor to Arthur D. Woolaway after Woolaway stepped down as chair of the Hawaii Republican Party. In 1963, he was elected to fill the vacancy on the Leeward Hospital board after the death of G.H. Webling and served as president of the board. Bains-Jordan died in Madison, Alabama, on February 4, 2021.

== Electoral history ==
1959 Hawaii House of Representatives 10th district primary
Party	Candidate	Votes	%
Democratic	Donald Ching (incumbent)	4,022	15.68%
Democratic	George M. Okano (incumbent)	3,690	14.39%
Democratic	Larry Kuriyama	3,183	12.41%
Democratic	Alvin Shim	2,152	8.39%
Democratic	El Ray D. Hegwood	2,080	8.11%
Republican	William Bains-Jordan	1,784	6.96%
Democratic	Carl J. Guntert	1,639	6.39%
Republican	Andrew Lee	1,449	5.65%
Republican	Daniel K. Kamalani	1,317	5.14%
Republican	George E. Richardson	1,209	4.71%
Democratic	Roger J. Endaub	1,202	4.69%
Republican	Shizuo Onishi	864	3.37%
Republican	Richard S. Oguro	531	2.07%
Republican	Raymond Eblacas	525	2.05%
Total votes		25,647	100.00%

1959 Hawaii House of Representatives 10th district election
Party	Candidate	Votes	%
Democratic	Larry Kuriyama	7,362	17.39%
Democratic	Donald Ching (incumbent)	6,709	15.84%
Democratic	George M. Okano (incumbent)	6,623	15.64%
Republican	William Bains-Jordan	5,510	13.01%
Democratic	Alvin Shim	5,165	12.20%
Republican	Andrew Lee	4,386	10.36%
Republican	George E. Richardson	3,402	8.03%
Republican	Daniel K. Kamalani	3,187	7.53%
Total votes		42,344	100.00%

1962 Hawaii House of Representatives 10th district primary
Party	Candidate	Votes	%
Democratic	Larry Kuriyama (incumbent)	6,894	18.50%
Democratic	Donald Ching (incumbent)	6,500	17.44%
Democratic	George Okano (incumbent)	6,440	17.28%
Democratic	Philip P. Minn	5,543	14.87%
Republican	William Bains-Jordan (incumbent)	3,106	8.33%
Republican	Nolle R. Smith Jr.	2,503	6.72%
Democratic	Raymond Eblacas	2,233	5.99%
Republican	Douglas King	2,029	5.44%
Republican	Carl R. Harding	2,020	5.42%
Total votes		37,268	100.00%
