= President Theodore Roosevelt High School =

Location
- 1120 Nehoa Street; Honolulu, Hawaiʻi 96822; United States; 21°18′37″N 157°50′14″W

Information
- Type: Public secondary
- Established: 1932
- School district: Honolulu District
- Principal: Kimberly Ann Fuller
- Teaching staff: 81.00 (FTE)
- Grades: 9–12
- Enrollment: 1,337 (2023-2024)
- Student to teacher ratio: 16.51
- Campus type: Urban
- Colors: Red and Gold
- Athletics: Oahu Interscholastic Association
- Nickname: Rough Riders
- Rival: McKinley High School; Punahou School
- Accreditation: Western Association of Schools and Colleges
- Complex Area: Kaimuki-McKinley-Roosevelt Complex Area
- Complex Area Schools: Anuenue School; Kawananakoa Middle School; Lincoln Elementary School; Maemae Elementary School; Manoa Elementary School; Noelani Elementary School; Nuuanu Elementary School; Pauoa Elementary School; Stevenson Middle School
- Website: www.roosevelthigh.org

President Theodore Roosevelt High School is a public, co-educational college preparatory high school in Honolulu, Hawai'i. It is operated by the Hawaiʻi State Department of Education and serves grades nine through 12. Roosevelt High School is accredited by the Western Association of Schools and Colleges. Roosevelt was ranked as the top high school in Hawaii in 2019 by U.S. News & World Report (see State and National Ranking, below).

== History ==
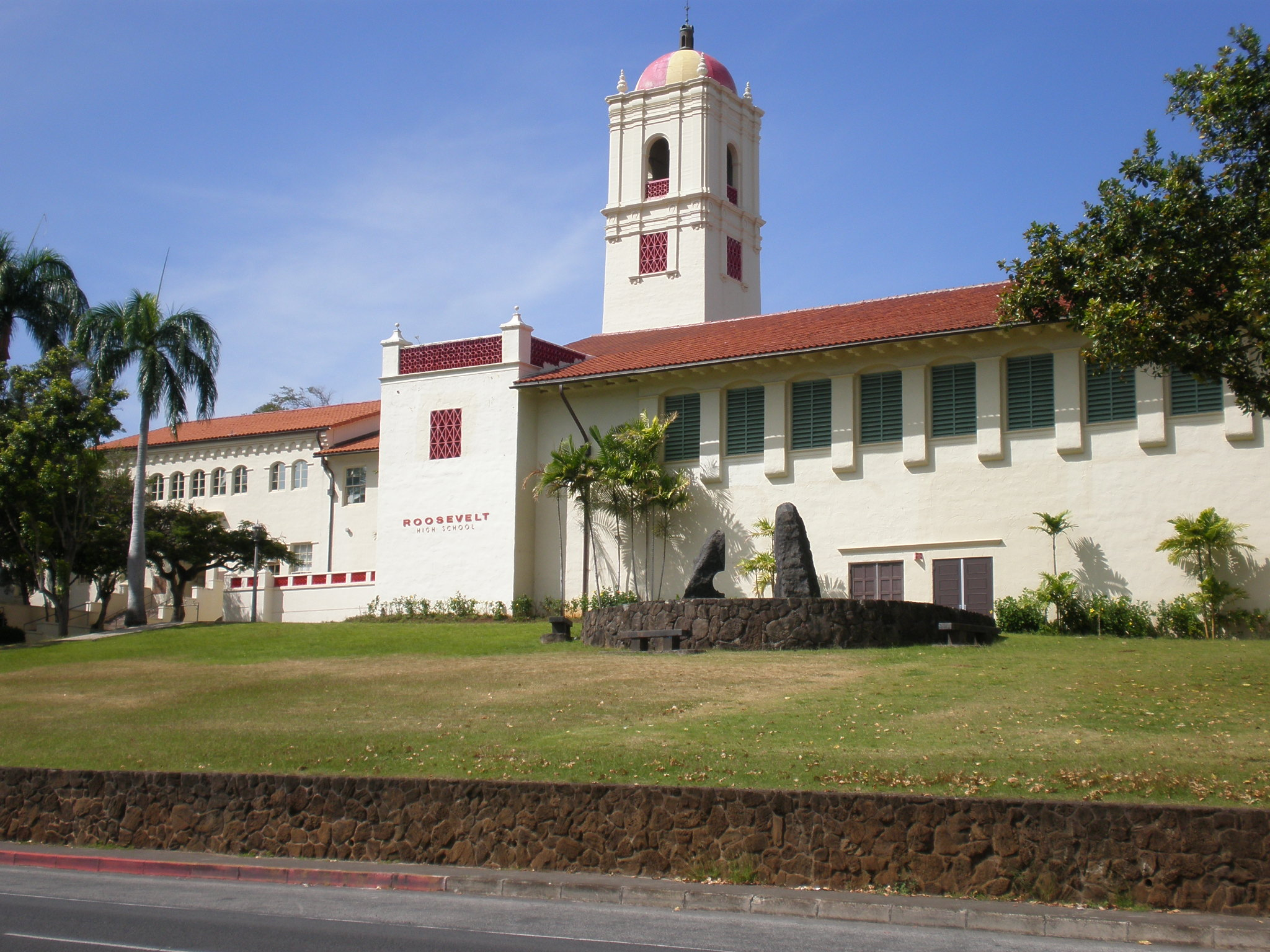
President Theodore Roosevelt High School

President Theodore Roosevelt High School is one of the oldest public secondary schools in the state of Hawaii. It was one of the first schools in the state to have compulsory Reserve Officer Training Corps education, a standard from 1934 to 1966.

The school avoided destruction when on March 4, 1942, the Imperial Japanese Navy attempted to bomb Pearl Harbor a second time. Weather caused one of the two floatplane bombers to drop its bombs 980 feet from the school, shattering some windows.

Roosevelt High School is most famous for its buildings and landmark domed bell tower constructed in Spanish mission architectural style, currently being restored through grants of the Hawaiʻi State Legislature. Its buildings were used as backdrops in several movie and television productions. Adjacent to the historic bell-towered building is the 2001 Hawaiian basalt sculpture "Hoʻokahi" (To Make as One), by Mark Watson.

=== Shooting ===
In January 2014, a police officer shot a knife-wielding runaway teen who was being detained for trespassing and became disruptive at the school.

== Campus and location ==
Roosevelt High School is located in urban Honolulu, Hawaiʻi. It is situated in Makiki's Kalāwahine Valley adjacent to the National Memorial Cemetery of the Pacific overlooking downtown Honolulu and Ala Moana.

== Demographics ==
There were 1427 students attending Roosevelt High School in the 2012-2013 school year. As of then, the racial composition was as follows:

- White: 5.2%
- Black: 1.0%
- Hispanic: 2.2%
- Asian/Pacific Islander: 84.2%
- American Indian: 0.4%
- Multiracial: 7.0%

== Notable alumni ==
Listed alphabetically by last name (year of graduation):

- Alfred Apaka, singer, bassist
- William Bains-Jordan, former member of the Hawaii House of Representatives
- Clarissa Chun, (2003) 2x US Olympian, wrestler
- Yvonne Elliman, singer, songwriter, and actress
- Frances Fong, singer and actress
- Mark Foo (1975), professional surfer
- Thomas Gill (1940), U.S. congressman and 4th Lieutenant Governor of Hawaii
- Dean Ho, bodybuilder and professional wretsler
- Ivanelle Hoe, swimmer
- John Dominis Holt IV, writer
- Andrew T. F. Ing, 3rd Lieutenant Governor of Hawaii
- Danny Kaleikini, American singer, musical artist, and entertainer
- Brittany Kamai, astrophysicist
- Darlene Keju, activist
- Ann Kobayashi, former member of the Hawaii Senate
- Kui Lee, singer-songwriter
- Sylvia Luke (1985), 16th Lieutenant Governor of Hawaii
- Mike Lum, former professional baseball player (Atlanta Braves, Cincinnati Reds, and Chicago Cubs)
- Bruno Mars (2003), singer, songwriter, and producer
- Gervin Miyamoto (1968), United States Marshal for the District of Hawaii
- Peter Moon (1962), ukulele and slack-key guitar player
- Kevin O'Connor (1953), actor
- Chad Owens, Canadian Football League player
- Larry Price (1963), radio talk show host
- Evelyn Rawski, professor of Chinese and Inner Asian history
- William S. Richardson, 16th Chief Justice of the Supreme Court of Hawaii and 2nd Lieutenant Governor of Hawaii
- James Shigeta (1947), actor
- John Simerson, American football player
- Sammy Steamboat, professional wrestler
- Faoa Aitofele Sunia (1962), former Lieutenant Governor of American Samoa
- Jenna Takenouchi, member of the Hawaii House of Representatives
- Ted Tsukiyama, attorney
- Byran Koji Uyesugi (1977), mass murderer
- Dietrich Varez, artist, printmaker
- Emma Veary (1949), singer
- Macel Wilson, Miss USA 1962

== State and National Ranking ==
Roosevelt received a "Best High School" ranking in 2019 from U.S. News & World Report with a score of 97.91, making it the top high school in Hawaii and ranking #360 nationally out of 17,245 ranked schools.
