= Gervin (surname) =

Gervin is a surname. Notable people with the surname include:

- Derrick Gervin (born 1963), American professional basketball player, brother of George Gervin
- Ernst Gervin (1908–1978), Norwegian magazine editor
- George Gervin (born 1952), American professional basketball player, Naismith Hall of Famer, and brother of Derrick Gervin
- Willy Gervin (1903–1951), Danish cyclist

== See also ==
- Jarvin, a surname and given name
