= Gervin Miyamoto =

American politician

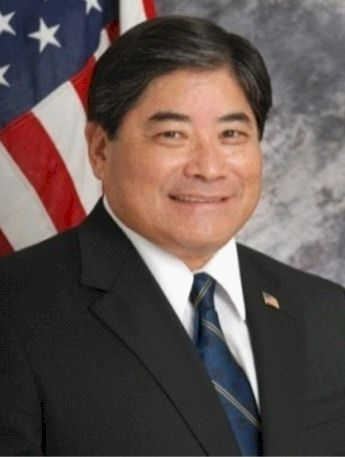

United States Marshal for the District of Hawaii
- Incumbent
- Assumed office June 17, 2010

Personal details
- Education: Chaminade University, University of Phoenix

Gervin Miyamoto was the 19th United States Marshal for the District of Hawaii, retiring in November 2017. As the United States Marshal, he led an office of Deputy US Marshals charged with enforcing laws and protecting the United States Federal District Court of Hawaii.

== Law Enforcement Career ==
Miyamoto joined the Honolulu Police Department in 1971. He served in a number of different elite units including Criminal Intelligence, Vice-Narcotics, and SWAT. Miyamoto also joined the Hawaii National Guard around the same time as he joined HPD, and has served continuously for the past 30+ years. His final assignment with HPD was as a lieutenant and special assistant to the Chief of Police (from 1993-1995). For the next four years (from 1995-1999), he served full-time with the Guard was as the Counterdrug Coordinator for the Adjutant General (from 1995-1999). Then, from 1999 to 2010, he served as the Law Enforcement Liaison for the United States Attorney for the District of Hawaii. In 2010, he was appointed by President Barack Obama to become the United States Marshal for the District of Hawaii. He replaced Mark Hanohano.

Miyamoto is a graduate of President Theodore Roosevelt High School (1968), Chaminade University (Bachelor of General Studies in Criminal Justice Management, 1980), and the University of Phoenix (Master of Arts in Organizational Management, 2000).
