= Ivanelle Hoe =

American swimmer (1938–2016)

Personal information
- Born: 1938
- Died: April 27, 2016 (aged 77–78)

Sport
- Sport: Swimming
- Strokes: Butterfly, breaststroke
- Club: Hawaii Rainbow Wahine

Ivanelle Hoe (1938–April 27, 2016) was an American swimmer. As a senior in high school, she set a world record in the 100m butterfly. In 2008, she was inducted into the Hawaii Swimming Hall of Fame.

== Career ==
Hoe earned her high school diploma at President Theodore Roosevelt High School, where she broke three swimming records in the breaststroke style swim. As a senior in high school, she set a world record in the 100m butterfly. She later attended the University of Hawaii where she competed with the Hawaii Rainbow Wahine swim team under coach Soichi Sakamoto. While studying at the University of Hawaii, she set seven state records, including the Amateur Athletic Union indoor 200-meter breaststroke title with a time of 3:10. She also beat the previous record of Evelyn Kawamoto at the 100-yard butterfly women's senior with a time of 1:03.2 and established a new Hawaiian record by completing the 400 yard individual medley in 5:53.8. As a result of her swimming accomplishments, she was a top prospect for the United States Olympic swimming team. She graduated from university with a Bachelor of Science degree in 1959 and established the Ivanelle Hoe Endowed Nursing Scholarship at Kapiʻolani Community College.

Upon graduating, Hoe became the co-athletic director for James B. Castle High School's boys' and girls' sports. In 1973, she competed in the National Masters Swimming Championships where she set a women's record in the 50-yard butterfly and also won the 100 breaststroke. She was inducted in the University of Hawaii's Circle of Honor in 1994 along with Roy Kuboyama and Larry Price and into the Hawaii Swimming Hall of Fame in 2008. Hoe died on April 27, 2016, at the age of 78.
