= Jason Jones (activist/filmmaker) =

American film producer, pro-life activist, and human rights worker

- Born: October 9, 1971 (age 54); Chicago, Illinois
- Occupations: Filmmaker, producer, human rights activist, radio host
- Known for: film, human rights advocacy
- Children: Marion Jones
- Website: https://www.movietomovement.com

Jason Jones (born October 9, 1971 in Chicago, Illinois) is an American film producer and human rights activist.

He is the president and founder of HERO, Inc., known for its two primary projects, Movie to Movement and The Vulnerable People Project.

Jones began his career in film and media with Movie to Movement, becoming known for producing projects dedicated to "social causes related to children and families." Jones' work in the anti-abortion movement had its beginnings in his time attending the University of Hawaiʻi. There he formed the anti-abortion Student Union and also served as State Chairman of Young Americans for Freedom, a national group of conservative student activists. He later became Chairman of the Hawaii Young Republicans, and worked as Chief-of-Staff for State Representative Mark Moses. Jones' other credentials include: Director of Hawaii Right to Life, National Youth Director of American Life League, grassroots Director of Brownback for President, and Public Relations Director for the world's largest international anti-abortion organization, Human Life International [2001-7].

Jones is the founder of The Great Campaign/The Vulnerable People Project and host on The Jason Jones Show. His media appearances include interviews on ABC's Politically Incorrect, Fox and CNN.

== Activism ==
Jones began working in the anti-abortion movement while he was attending the University of Hawaiʻi. He formed the Pro-Life Student Union and was chairman of the Hawaii chapter of Young Americans for Freedom, a group of conservative student activists.

In March 2009, Jones travelled to Sudan and visited refugees in Northern Aweil, on the Darfur border and inspected 26 new water wells. In addition, he distributed $2 million in food, medicine, and other aid. This visit was undertaken despite the expulsion of all non-governmental organizations and a warning of unsafe travel from the U.S. State Department. Local charities documented the aid missions, Jones's distribution of food and inspection of wells, in partnership with others who remained within the country after U.S. State Department warnings.

Jones spearheaded aid to children at risk of starvation in the crisis precipitated by the United States military pullout from Afghanistan. He facilitated campaigns in Ukraine beginning in 2022 to treat civilians harmed by the Russian invasion, and completed other humanitarian missions in Gaza and Sudan. He used his public position as a filmmaker to raise awareness of the sufferings of the Afghan people.

In 2026, Jones's Vulnerable People Project spearheaded an aid mission to the West Bank in Gaza.

== Filmography ==
- Bella (2006) (Producer)
- The Stoning of Soraya M. (2008) (Producer) Winner NAACP Image Award 2008
- Crescendo (2011) (Producer)
- Voiceless (2015) (Producer)
- Divided Hearts of America (2020) (Producer)

== Books and writing ==
Jones is a senior contributing columnist on The Stream and Catholic Vote, and has written several books, including The Race to Save Our Century and The Great Campaign (2024).

== Political involvement ==
Jones was chairman of the College Republicans at the University of Hawaii and later the Chairman of the Hawaii Young Republicans; he worked as Chief-of-Staff for State Representative Mark Moses.

In 2004, Jones worked for the RNC.

He was the grassroots director for Senator Sam Brownback's presidential campaign. He was Public Relations Director for the world’s largest international anti-abortion organization, Human Life International from 2001 to 2007.

Jones backed Senator Ted Cruz's 2016 presidential campaign.

== Media appearances ==
Jones was the host of The Facts of Life radio show. He has appeared on ABC’s Politically Incorrect, EWTN, Al Jazeera, Fox and CNN. Jones currently hosts the podcast The Jason Jones Show.
