= Nishizawa =

Nishizawa is a Japanese surname. Notable people with the surname include:

- Akinori Nishizawa, Japanese footballer
- Hiroyoshi Nishizawa, Japanese World War II flying ace
- Jun-ichi Nishizawa, Japanese engineer
- Junji Nishizawa, Japanese footballer
- Kenta Nishizawa (西澤 健太, born 1996), Japanese footballer
- Luis Nishizawa, Mexican artist
- Michio Nishizawa, Japanese baseball player
- Ryue Nishizawa, Japanese architect
- Shiena Nishizawa, Japanese pop rock singer
- Yoshiko Nishizawa, a fictional character from the anime/manga series Strike Witches
- Yoshiya Nishizawa, Japanese footballer
