= Allison Bianco =

American artist (born 1979)

- Born: Providence, Rhode Island, U.S.
- Education: Mount Holyoke College, University of Hawaiʻi at Mānoa
- Occupations: Artist and Printmaker

Allison Bianco (born 1979; also known as Allison Uttley) is an American visual artist and printmaker. She is based in Rhode Island.

== Early life and education ==
Born in 1979, in Providence, Rhode Island, Bianco earned her master of fine arts degree in printmaking from the University of Hawaiʻi at Mānoa in Honolulu, Hawaii, and a bachelor of arts degree in studio art from Mount Holyoke College in South Hadley, Massachusetts.

== Artwork ==
Bianco draws upon a visual history of Rhode Island by using oceanscapes and physical changes to depict a shift in our remembrance of those places.

Curator Britany Salsbury describes Bianco's work as using, "printmaking to explore her relationship to her memories of her native Rhode Island through a combination of technical experimentation and art historical references... these landscapes have increasingly symbolized the juxtaposition between memory and reality, and the impact of nostalgia on the reliability of her own experience of place... Bianco leads the viewer through her own memory of a place, translating experience through process."

Bianco's work uses, "arresting color," at times contrasted by the allusion of more tragic circumstances. In his article in Hyperallergic, art critic, writer and museum scholar Seph Rodney describes Bianco's Gaspee Down the Line as a disorienting and fantastical beach scene with, "prodigal visual elements." Bianco's technique typically combines multiple processes within a single print, including etching, screen printing, and hot foil stamping as well as drawing and coloring by hand to produce "a dialogue between the language of an etched line and the flat, vibrant quality of acrylic inks."

=== The Great New England Hurricane Project ===
Since 2022 Bianco has been working on 38 Going on 90: A Print Series of The Great New England Hurricane, a multi-disciplinary project that reimagines the 1938 New England hurricane as a series of prints and installations through the lens of nostalgia and environmental history. For this project, Bianco gathers source material through multi-day trips to the landscapes and communities affected by the historic storm. Each research trip corresponds to a specific geographic point along the hurricane’s path as it moved north from Long Island through New England and into Canada. The body of work is planned to debut in 2028, the 90th anniversary of the storm.

== Collections ==
Bianco's work can be found in the following collections, among others:

- Museum of Fine Arts, Boston, Massachusetts;
- Philadelphia Museum of Art, Pennsylvania;
- New York Public Library, New York, New York;
- New York City Department of Education, Public Art for Public Schools, New York, New York;
- University Print Collection, University of San Diego, California;
- Rhode Island School of Design Museum, Providence, Rhode Island;
- Hawaiʻi State Foundation on Culture and the Arts, Art in Public Places Collection, Honolulu, Hawaii;
- Yale University Art Gallery, New Haven, Connecticut.

=== Public Art Commissions ===
- Curious Tide, 2022. Dye sublimation porcelain tile, mahogany, acrylic. P.S. 958, Brooklyn, Collection of the NYC Department of Education, Public Art for Public Schools.
- Long Foretold, 2024. 3 panels, dye sublimation aluminum. Horace Mann Hall, Rhode Island College, Providence, RI. Commissioned by Rhode Island College and Rhode Island State Council on the Arts.

== Exhibitions ==
Bianco's solo exhibitions include:

- Saint Anselm College, Manchester, New Hampshire;
- University of Rhode Island Main Gallery, Kingston, Rhode Island;
- Cade Tompkins Projects, Providence, Rhode Island;
- University of Hawaiʻi at Mānoa Commons Gallery, Honolulu, Hawaii;
- Weil Gallery, Wheaton College, Norton, Massachusetts;
- AS220 Project Space, Providence, Rhode Island;
- The Print Center, Philadelphia, Pennsylvania;
- Hawaii Pacific University Art Gallery, Honolulu, Hawaii.

Notable group exhibitions include:

- Give Me Space: New Prints 2020/Summer, Print Center New York (formerly International Print Center New York), New York, New York (selected by Chitra Ganesh);
- Raid the Icebox Now with Sebastian Ruth: Witnessing, RISD Museum, Providence, Rhode Island;
- Emphasized, Selections from the Art in Public Places Collection, Hawaiʻi State Art Museum, Honolulu, Hawaii;
- Innervisions: New Prints 2016/Summer, Print Center New York, New York, New York;
- Print Love: Celebrating the Print Center at 100, Philadelphia Museum of Art, Philadelphia, Pennsylvania.

== Public Recognition ==
- MacDowell Fellow 2025.
- New England Regional Fellowship Consortium (NERFC Fellow) 2026-2027.
- Featured on PBS ART inc., Season 3, Episode 5. Allison Bianco: Imagining the Storm.
