= Kenneth Wayne Bushnell =

American visual artist (1933–2020)

Double Square Series No. 6 by Kenneth Bushnell, 1982, Honolulu Museum of Art

Kenneth Wayne Bushnell (October 16, 1933 - October 4, 2020) was an American visual artist, who was born in Los Angeles. He completed a BA at the UCLA in 1958, and an MFA at the University of Hawaiʻi in 1961. He taught painting at the University of Hawaiʻi at Mānoa from 1961 to 1981, and was appointed chairman of the Art Department in 1991. He married fellow artist Helen Gilbert (1922 - 8 April 2002) in 1995. Bushnell would be elevated to professor emeritus, living in Honolulu.

Bushnell is best known for his geometric abstract paintings, although his works also includes sculpture, light sculptures, wall reliefs, films, multimedia theater and environmental designs. His acrylic painting on cotton from 1982, Double Square Series No. 6 is in the collection of the Honolulu Museum of Art. It is typical of his geometric abstract paintings. For more than 25 years, Bushnell has been working on the Euclidean Dream Cycle which is built upon equilateral triangles and arcs of its altitude. The Bibliothèque nationale de France, the British Museum, the Brooklyn Museum, the Honolulu Museum of Art, the Museum of Modern Art (New York City), and the Whitney Museum of American Art (New York City) are among the public collections holding work by Kenneth Wayne Bushnell.
