= Rick Mills =

American glass artist (born 1957)

Rick Mills (born 1957) is an American glass artist who was born and raised in Marion, Ohio.

He received his bachelor of fine art degree in sculpture from Ohio State University, where the art department reopened its glass program in 1980, during Mills last semester. He moved to Hawai'i in 1981 and earned a master of fine art degree, also in sculpture, from the University of Hawaiʻi at Mānoa, where he is currently professor and director of the glass art program.

His recent works often encapsulate figurative elements in cast glass, as in Once Empty, Twice Full in the collection of the Hawaii State Art Museum. The Glasmuseet Ebeltoft (Ebeltoft, Denmark), the Hawaii State Art Museum, the Honolulu Museum of Art, the Museum of American Glass (Millville, New Jersey), and the Royal College of Art (London) are among the museums holding works by Mills. His creations are permanently installed in these public locations:

- Spirit of Loyalty at the University of Hawaiʻi at Mānoa, Queen Lili'uokalani Center for Student Services, cast glass and bronze sculpture, 1995
- Reef Map at the Hawaii Convention Center, Ala Halawai Concourse, 3rd floor, glass, copper and stainless steel mural, 12 x 24 feet, 1998
- Ka Piko (The Center) at Leilehua High School in Wahiawā, Hawaii, sculptural glass mural, 10 x 16 feet, 2003
- Healing Waters at the entrance lobby of the Maui Memorial Medical Center in Kahului, Hawai'i, pair of glass wall sculptures, 11 x 21 feet each, 2007
- Mills is currently (2014) creating a series of five large scale monolithic cast glass sculptures for the new Hawai‘i State Public Library in Mānoa.
