= Helen Gilbert (artist) =

American sculptor

Licomos, a kinetic sculpture by Helen Gilbert, 1970, polarized light, painted Plexiglass and wooden box, Honolulu Museum of Art,

Helen Gilbert (1922 – 8 April 2002), also known as Helen Gilbert-Bushnell, Helen Odell Gilbert and Helen Odell, was an American artist and art-educator born in Mare Island, California.

She earned a baccalaureate in art at Mills College, in California. After graduation, she moved to Honolulu, where she married Honolulu physician Fred Gilbert. In 1968, she received a Master of Fine Arts degree from the University of Hawaiʻi at Mānoa, and then remained on the faculty for 30 years. Her second marriage was to fellow artist Kenneth Wayne Bushnell in 1995. She had also been a visiting professor at Parsons The New School for Design and the Pratt Institute. She died at home on April 8, 2002.

Although she painted images of the land and people of Hawaii with brush and palette knife, her fame rests upon her pioneering use of polarized light in kinetic sculpture. Licomos, a kinetic sculpture from 1970, in the collection of the Honolulu Museum of Art is an example. The colors change as they move around in a circle behind stationary Plexiglass. The Bibliothèque nationale de France, the British Museum, the Honolulu Museum of Art, the Georgia Museum of Art, the Metropolitan Museum of Art, the Museum of Modern Art (New York), the Solomon R. Guggenheim Museum (New York), Stedelijk Museum Amsterdam, the Tate Gallery (London), Tokyo National Museum, the Walker Art Center (Minneapolis), and the Whitney Museum of American Art (New York) are among the public collections holding works by Helen Gilbert.
