= Tseng Yu-ho =

Chinese-American art historian, artist (1924–2017)

- 曾佑和
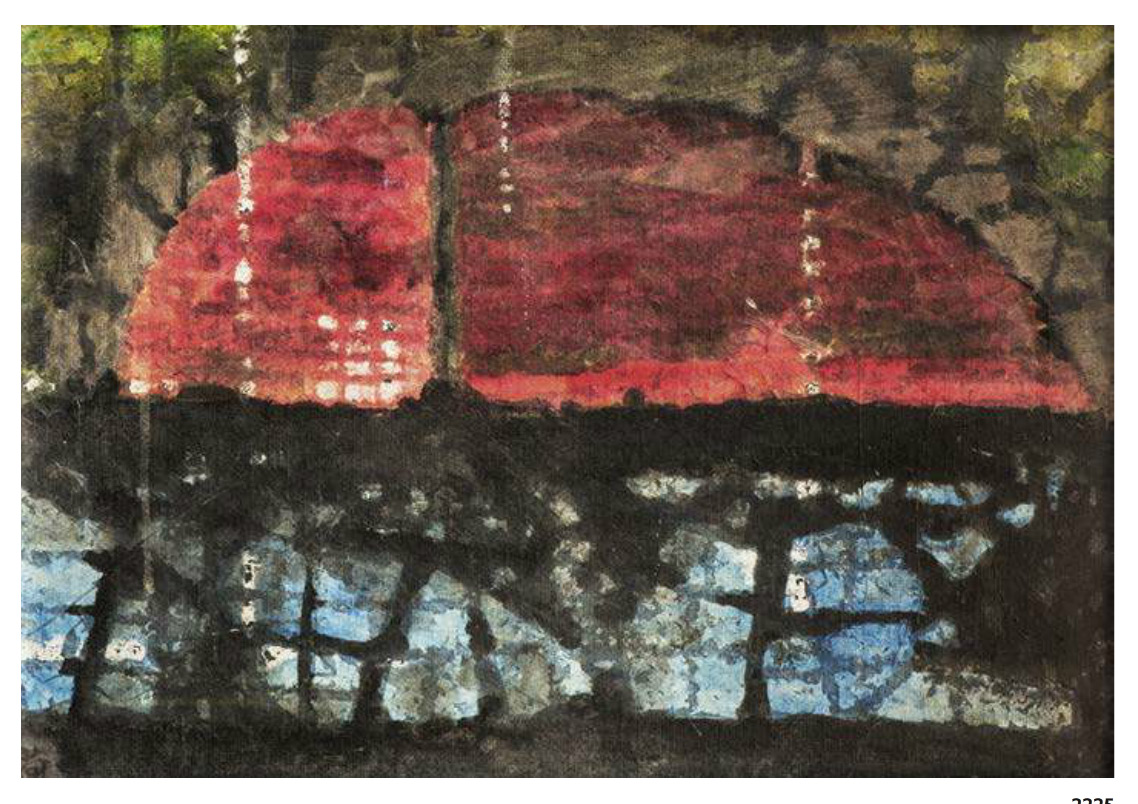
- Mixed media (gouache, aluminum, paper, canvas) by Yu-ho, 35.2 x 50.5 cm
- Born: c. 1924; Peking, China (now Beijing)
- Died: September 16, 2017; China
- Other names: Tseng Yuho, Betty Ecke, Betty Tseng Yu-Ho Ecke
- Education: Fu-jen University (BA), Peking University, University of Hawaiʻi at Mānoa (MA), New York University Institute of Fine Arts (PhD)
- Occupations: Art historian, visual artist, curator, educator
- Known for: Chinese art history, mixed media collage
- Spouse: Gustav Ecke (m. 1945–1971; his death)

Seagulls by Yu-ho, 1965, Honolulu Museum of Art

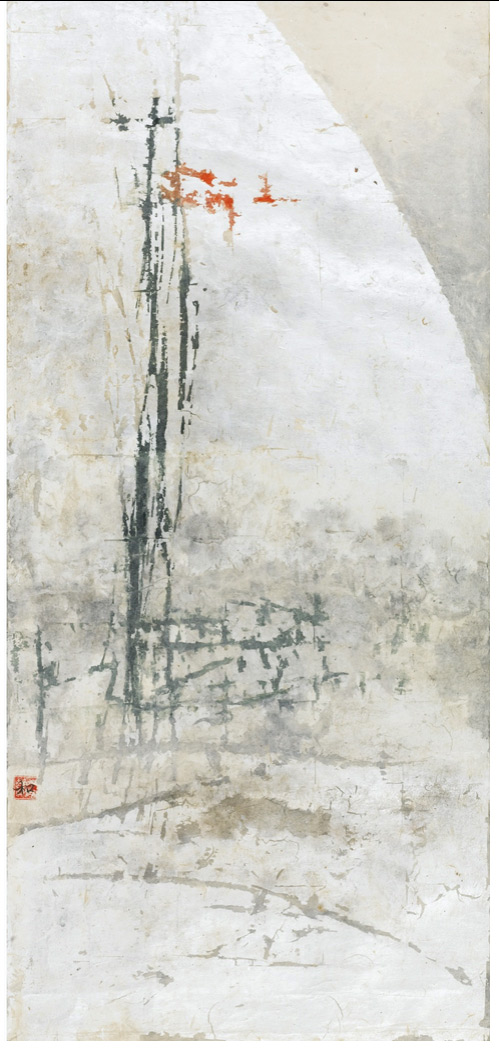
Acrylic, aluminum on paper mounted on canvas, by Yu-ho signed and with an artist seal, 122.6 x 56.5 cm

Tseng Yu-ho (Chinese: 曾佑和; 1924/1925–2017) was a Chinese-born American art historian, visual artist, curator, and educator. She taught at University of Hawaiʻi at Mānoa, and was a curator at the Honolulu Academy of Arts (now Honolulu Museum of Art). She is also known as Betty Ecke, Tseng Yuho, and Betty Tseng Yu-Ho Ecke.

== Early life and family ==
Tseng Yu-ho was born either in 1924 or 1925 in Peking, China. As the daughter of an admiral, she had a privileged upbringing. Tseng started painting when she was 11, when she was bedridden for 3 months with pleurisy. When she recovered, she began studying painting with the chief Manchu House representative prince Pu Jin.

She graduated from Fu-jen University (now Fu Jen Catholic University) in 1942, and then pursued graduate studies in Chinese art history and Chinese literature at Fu-jen University and Peking University.

Yu-ho married German-born art historian Gustav Ecke in 1945. She had been one of his students at Peking University.

== Career ==
Yu-ho started receiving international recognition in 1946, when Michael Sullivan began praising and writing about her work. The Eckes moved to Honolulu in 1949, where Yu-ho earned a master's degree from the University of Hawaiʻi at Mānoa, and was the curator of Asian Art at the Honolulu Academy of Arts from 1950 to 1963.

In 1953, she received a Rockefeller Foundation scholarship to study art collections in the United States. In 1954 the Smithsonian Institution toured her solo exhibition to ten museums. Yu-ho had a solo exhibition at the Walker Art Center in 1959. In 1972, she received a PhD in Asian art history from New York University Institute of Fine Arts.

She taught Chinese Art History at the University of Hawaiʻi at Mānoa from the 1970s to 1986.

Yu-ho was one of the founding members of the Society of Asian Art of Hawaii. She was named as one of the Living Treasures of Hawaii in 1989, by the Honpa Hongwanji Mission of Hawaii.

== Style and work ==
Yu-ho artworks vary across different mediums, including traditional Chinese mount-making, calligraphy, and paintings. She started developing her "Dsui Hua" paintings in the early 1950s which would later become her signature style. Her work would later become more abstract but would still keep a connection to the classical Chinese canon.

== Death and legacy ==
She died on September 16, 2017, in China.

As an artist, Yu-ho is best known for her collages created by tearing and layering colored handmade papers. She called these artworks "Dsui Hua" paintings. Seagulls from 1965, in the collection of the Honolulu Museum of Art, is an example of this collage technique.

== Selected publications ==
- Arnason, H. H. and Tseng Yu-Ho, Tseng Yu-Ho: Exhibition of Paintings in Watercolor-Collage, The Downtown Gallery, New York, 1960
- Ecke, Tseng Yu-Ho, Chinese Folk Art in American Collections Early 15th Through 20th Centuries, China Institute in America, New York, 1976
- Ecke, Tseng Yu-Ho Chinese Folk Art II: in American Collections, From Early 15th Century to Early 20th Century, University of Hawaii Press, 1977 ASIN: B00070SJ92
- Nakano, Toru; Ecke, Tseng Yuho; Cahill, Suzanne, Bronze Mirrors from Ancient China: Donald H. Graham Jr. Collection, Orientations, Hong Kong, 1994 ISBN 9627956015
- Yuho, Tseng; Link, Howard A., The Art of Tseng Yuho, Honolulu Academy of the Arts, 1989 ISBN 0937426075
- Yuho, Tseng, A History of Chinese Calligraphy, The Chinese University Press, Hong Kong, 1993, ISBN 9622014267
- Yuho, Tseng, Dsui Hua: Dsui Paintings, a Retrospective Exhibition, Hanart T Z Gallery, Hong Kong/Taipei, 1992 ASIN: B0023X7EWY
- Yu-Ho, Tseng, Some Contemporary Elements in Classical Chinese Art, University of Hawaii Press, 1963 ISBN 0870228129
