= Allyn Bromley =

American printmaker and art educator (1928–2026)

Breakfast Buddha by Allyn Bromley, 2004, color screen print with mixed-media hand work

Allyn Bromley (June 4, 1928 – January 1, 2026) was an American visual artist and art educator who was born in San Francisco. She first came to Hawaii in 1952, and subsequently moved to Waikiki, where she lived for nine years. From 1961 to 1965, she lived in Europe, returning to Hawaii in 1965. She received a BFA from the University of Hawaii at Manoa in 1968 and an MFA from the University of Colorado Boulder in 1971.

Bromley began her teaching career at Leeward Community College in 1972, where she taught until 1983. She became director of the Printmaking Department at the University of Hawaii at Manoa in 1983, and retired as a professor emeritus in 2000.

She worked primarily in screen printing. Since the late 1980s, she has been combining printing with painting, drawing, and collaging. Breakfast Buddha, from 2004, is an example of her mixed-media prints. As in much of her portrait work, the subject's silhouette is emphasized, and facial details are minimized. The Hawaii State Art Museum and the Honolulu Museum of Art are among the public collections holding work by Allyn Bromley.

The Honolulu Museum of Art held a solo exhibition of her recent works under the title, Allyn Bromley: At the Edge of Forever, from November 2024 to June 2025.

Bromley died in Mānoa, Oahu on January 1, 2026, at the age of 97.
