= Aloha from Hawaii via Satellite (album) =

Live album by Elvis Presley
- Released: February 1, 1973
- Recorded: January 14, 1973
- Genres: Rock; pop; country
- Length: 62:48
- Label: RCA Records
- Producers: Joan Deary, Marty Pasetta

Elvis Presley chronology
Separate Ways (1972)	Aloha from Hawaii via Satellite (1973)	Elvis (1973)

Alternative cover
- Reissue cover

Singles from Aloha from Hawaii via Satellite
- 1. "Steamroller Blues" Released: April 1973

Professional ratings
Review scores
Source	Rating
AllMusic	3/5 stars
MusicHound	2.5/5 stars
The Rolling Stone Album Guide	3/5 stars
Rough Guides	3/5 stars

Aloha from Hawaii via Satellite is a live album by American singer and musician Elvis Presley, released by RCA Records in February 1973. The album consists of recordings from Presley's January 1973 concert of the same name, a worldwide ratings smash. It peaked at number one on the Billboard 200 chart in the spring of the same year. Despite the satellite innovation, the concert did not air in the United States until April 4. The album dominated the charts, reaching number one on both the pop and country charts in the US.

The album was certified Gold on February 13, 1973, platinum and 2× Platinum on May 20, 1988, 3× Platinum on July 15, 1999, and 5× Platinum on August 1, 2002, by the RIAA. On April 15, 2016, the BPI certified the album Silver for sales of 60,000 units.

== Content ==
Aloha from Hawaii is a two-disc set—only the second such release of Elvis Presley's career (the first being 1969's double set From Memphis to Vegas/From Vegas to Memphis, which contained one album each of studio and concert recordings). It was initially released only in quadraphonic sound, becoming the first album in the format to top the Billboard 200 albums chart. After quadrophonic sound failed to catch on, RCA issued a standard stereophonic version of the album.

The album contains all the live performances from the TV special, of which, eight of the songs had previously been recorded by Presley at various times but had never before been released, as a sticker on the album cover announced. The album omits the five songs Presley recorded after the show and which were featured on the original broadcast; these would be issued later on the album Mahalo from Elvis. The album also omits Presley's brief announcement concerning the concert being presented for the benefit of the Kui Lee Cancer Fund.

This is the penultimate live album that Presley released during his lifetime, the last being Elvis Recorded Live on Stage in Memphis the following year. (Later soundtracks for the TV special Elvis in Concert and the documentary This Is Elvis were released posthumously).

== Cover art ==
The album's cover art features an illustration of an Intelsat IV F satellite, the same model used in broadcasting the concert, in orbit over the Earth. A circular cutout on the cover allows the viewer to see a photo of Presley that is printed on the album's inner sleeve.

Allegedly, the Van Camp Seafood Company, the parent company of Chicken of the Sea, gave promotional copies of the album (serial number VPSX-6089) to employees prior to the concert's satellite broadcast on US television. These copies had large hype stickers that featured the Chicken of the Sea logo, a message about the concert that dubbed it "Elvis Presley's greatest T.V. performance", and the air date. These copies became especially coveted by record collectors, with sealed copies selling for over a thousand dollars each. However, there is no evidence that Van Camp ever designed or printed such stickers and they're most likely forgeries by Presley memorabilia dealers.

== Track listing ==
=== Original LP release ===
Side one
No.	Title	Writer(s)	Length
1.	"Also sprach Zarathustra"	Richard Strauss	1:11
2.	"See See Rider"	Ma Rainey, Lena Arant	2:27
3.	"Burning Love"	Dennis Linde	3:09
4.	"Something"	George Harrison	3:28
5.	"You Gave Me a Mountain"	Marty Robbins	3:15
6.	"Steamroller Blues"	James Taylor	3:04

Side two
No.	Title	Writer(s)	Length
1.	"My Way"	Claude François, Jacques Revaux, Paul Anka	3:58
2.	"Love Me"	Jerry Leiber, Mike Stoller	1:53
3.	"Johnny B. Goode"	Chuck Berry	1:42
4.	"It's Over"	Jimmie Rodgers	2:08
5.	"Blue Suede Shoes"	Carl Perkins	1:15
6.	"I'm So Lonesome I Could Cry"	Hank Williams	2:15
7.	"I Can't Stop Loving You"	Don Gibson	2:25
8.	"Hound Dog"	Jerry Leiber, Mike Stoller	0:55

Side three
No.	Title	Writer(s)	Length
1.	"What Now My Love"	Gilbert Bécaud, Carl Sigman	3:15
2.	"Fever"	Eddie Cooley, John Davenport	2:47
3.	"Welcome to My World"	John Hathcock, Ray Winkler	1:53
4.	"Suspicious Minds"	Mark James	4:26
5.	"Introductions by Elvis"	—	1:41

Side four
No.	Title	Writer(s)	Length
1.	"I'll Remember You"	Kui Lee	2:33
2.	"Long Tall Sally" / "Whole Lotta Shakin' Goin' On" (medley)	Robert Blackwell, Enotris Johnson, Richard Penniman / Dave "Curley" Williams	2:08
3.	"An American Trilogy"	Mickey Newbury	4:31
4.	"A Big Hunk O' Love"	Aaron Schroeder, Sidney Wyche	1:56
5.	"Can't Help Falling in Love"	George Weiss, Hugo Peretti, Luigi Creatore	2:54

=== CD reissue ===
The following tracks were recorded by Presley after the concert and inserted into the broadcast with the exception of "No More", which remained unheard until 1978's Mahalo from Elvis. They were not included in the original soundtrack album, but they appear on the 1998 CD reissue.

1998 CD reissue tracks
No.	Title	Writer(s)	Length
1.	"Blue Hawaii"	Ralph Rainger, Leo Robin	2:33
2.	"Ku-U-I-Po"	George David Weiss, Hugo Peretti, Luigi Creatore	2:07
3.	"No More"	Don Robertson, Hal Blair	2:30
4.	"Hawaiian Wedding Song"	Al Hoffman, Dick Manning, Charles E. King	1:56
5.	"Early Morning Rain"	Gordon Lightfoot	2:54

== Charts ==
Chart performance for Aloha from Hawaii via Satellite
Chart (1973–1978)	Peak position
Canada Top Albums/CDs (RPM)	1
Dutch Albums (Album Top 100)	49
German Albums (Offizielle Top 100)	38
Norwegian Albums (VG-lista)	7
UK Albums Chart	11
US Billboard 200	1
US Top Country Albums (Billboard)	1

2023 chart performance for Aloha from Hawaii via Satellite
Chart (2023)	Peak position
Austrian Albums (Ö3 Austria)	58
Belgian Albums (Ultratop Flanders)	58
Belgian Albums (Ultratop Wallonia)	48
Swiss Albums (Schweizer Hitparade)	10

== See also ==
- Aloha from Hawaii via Satellite (music concert)
- Mahalo from Elvis
