= It's Over (Jimmie Rodgers song) =

1966 single by Jimmie Rodgers

Single by Jimmie Rodgers

from the album It's Over
- A-side: "It's Over"
- B-side: "Anita, You're Dreaming" (from Country Music 1966)
- Released: 1966
- Length: 2:37
- Songwriter: Jimmie F. Rodgers

Jimmie Rodgers singles chronology
"A Fallen Star" (1966)	"It's Over" (1966)	"Young Ideas" (1966)

"It's Over"

Song by Elvis Presley

from the album Aloha from Hawaii
- Released: February 4, 1973
- Recorded: January 14, 1973
- Length: 2:08
- Songwriter: Jimmie F. Rodgers

"It's Over" is a 1966 song written and originally performed by Jimmie Rodgers. He released it as a single in 1966, with "Anita, You're Dreaming" on the flip side.

Jimmie Rodgers recalled:

I was with Herb Alpert and the Tijuana Brass at Carnegie Hall in New York, and there was a girl there at the show. She was standing outside crying and we began to talk. She had just broken up with her boyfriend. I asked if she was okay. She said, "No, my boyfriend and I broke up today and it's over." I went back to my room and wrote "It's Over." I never had Elvis in mind to do it when I wrote the song.

== Track listing ==
=== Jimmie Rodgers version ===
7" single (1966)

1. "It's Over" 2:37
2. "Anita, You're Dreaming" (2:30)

== Charts ==
=== Jimmie Rodgers version ===
Chart (1966)	Peak position
Canada RPM	29
U.S. Billboard Easy Listening	5
U.S. Billboard Hot 100	37

== Cover versions ==
- Elvis Presley recorded a live version of "It's Over" at his January 14, 1973 televised concert special Aloha from Hawaii. The recording was first released on the LP Aloha from Hawaii. He also had recorded the song live (for RCA and MGM) in April 1972. Another live recording, from February 17, 1972, was released in 1995 on the box set Walk a Mile in My Shoes: The Essential '70s Masters.
- The song has also been covered by Glen Campbell (in 1967), Dusty Springfield, Sonny James and Billie Davis.
- In his 1970 release, Scott Walker released the song on the album, 'Til the Band Comes In.
