= Mahalo from Elvis =

Mahalo From Elvis
- CD reissue cover

Compilation album by Elvis Presley
- Released: September 1978
- Recorded: 1963–1967, January 14, 1973
- Genre: Rock & roll
- Label: Pickwick; RCA Camden (CD reissue)
- Producer: Joan Deary, Marty Pasetta

Elvis Presley chronology
Elvis Sings For Children and Grownups Too (1978)	Mahalo From Elvis (1978)	Elvis: A Canadian Tribute (1978)

Mahalo From Elvis is a compilation album by American singer and musician Elvis Presley, released posthumously in 1978.

== Content ==
Side one consists of five previously unissued tracks Presley recorded in Honolulu on January 14, 1973 for inclusion in the U.S.-version of the live concert TV special Aloha from Hawaii (these tracks were, in fact, recorded after the conclusion of the concert, with no audience present, therefore they are not considered truly "live" recordings). The recording of No More, however, was not used in the special. All songs on side two were previously issued recordings originating from various Presley movie soundtracks from the 1960s. The album was issued by Pickwick Records by arrangement with RCA Records, who leased Pickwick the rights to reissue certain recordings by Presley and other RCA recording artists, most of which were previously issued on the budget label, RCA Camden. This album had been assembled by RCA in late 1973 and was slated to be released on the RCA Camden label, but was not issued at that time. The UK version was titled The King and featured different artwork. In 1991, the album was reissued on compact disc in the RCA Camden Classics series. Mahalo from Elvis was certified Gold on September 15, 2011 by the RIAA.

== Track listing ==
Side one
No.	Title	Writer(s)	Length
1.	"Blue Hawaii"	Ralph Rainger, Leo Robin	2:30
2.	"Early Morning Rain"	Gordon Lightfoot	2:52
3.	"Hawaiian Wedding Song"	Al Hoffman, Dick Manning	2:53
4.	"KU-U-I-PO"	George David Weiss, Hugo Peretti, Luigi Creatore	2:05
5.	"No More"	Hal Blair, Don Robertson, Sebastián Iradier	2:28

Side two
No.	Title	Writer(s)	Length
1.	"Relax" (from It Happened at the World's Fair)	Roy Bennett, Sid Tepper	2:18
2.	"Baby, If You'll Give Me All Of Your Love" (from Double Trouble)	Joy Byers	1:47
3.	"One Broken Heart for Sale" (from It Happened at the World's Fair)	Otis Blackwell, Winfield Scott	1:34
4.	"So Close, And Yet So Far (From Paradise)" (from Harum Scarum)	Joy Byers	3:00
5.	"Happy Ending" (from It Happened at the World's Fair)	Sid Wayne, Ben Weisman	2:07
