= The Extraordinary Kui Lee =

Studio album by Kui Lee
- Released: December 2, 1966
- Recorded: March – July 1965
- Studio: CBS 30th Street Studio
- Genre: Traditional pop Hawaiian Music
- Length: 32:44
- Label: Columbia Records
- Producer: Mike Berniker

Kui Lee chronology
The Extraordinary Kui Lee (1966)	The World of Kui Lee (1970)

The Extraordinary Kui Lee is Hawaiian singer-songwriter Kui Lee's debut album. Lee recorded the album while enjoying popularity on his home state. Under treatment for cancer, Lee recorded the tracks during separate sessions.

A single to promote the album was released in May 1966, while the album was released on December 2, 1966, the previous day to Lee's death. The album opened to favorable reviews.

== Recording ==
Lee started to work on the record while visiting mainland United States in March 1965, following a club performance in San Francisco. Upon his arrival in New York City, he cut his first tracks with Columbia Records. At the time, Lee was under treatment for lymph gland cancer. Due to the progression of the disease, the record was cut throughout different sessions, as Lee returned to the city while under treatment at the Memorial Sloan Kettering Cancer Center in July. It was produced by Mike Berniker and the arrangements for the tracks were provided by Stuart Scharf and Bernie Krause.

== Release and reception ==
The single of the album "Ain't No Big Thing", paired with "All I Want To Do" had been released in May. The record was released on December 2, 1966, the day before Lee's death. Lee did not hear the finished record.

The Honolulu Star-Bulletin's review defined Lee's a "sincere delivery". The Honolulu Advertiser favored Lee, and called the album an "anthology of Kui, the entertainer. The Boston Globe felt that at the time of his death, Lee's career started to expand to the mainland and determined that the release "constitutes his legacy". El Paso Times delivered a positive review, and called it "a different, interesting and enjoyable recording." Billboard called it a "delightful package".

In 1997, the album was reissued on compact disc. In its new review, The Honolulu Star-Bulletin pointed Lee as "a composer-performer who envisioned modern Hawaiian music fueled by the energy and cosmopolitan outlook of the first years of statehood". Allmusic praised Lee and declared that he "modernized" the music of Hawaii, as it deemed him a song-writer "graced with great emotion and sensitivity".

== Track listing ==
All tracks are written by Kui Lee

Side 1
No.	Title	Length
1.	"I'll Remember You"	2:32
2.	"Rain, Rain, Go Away"	2:06
3.	"Yes, It's You"	3:01
4.	"Ka Makani Ka 'Ili Aloha"	3:21
5.	"Goin' Home"	3:12
6.	"Ain't No Big Thing"	2:26
Total length:		16:38

All tracks are written by Kui Lee

Side 2
No.	Title	Length
1.	"Na Ali'I"	2:04
2.	"The Days of My Youth"	4:28
9.	"All I Want to Do"	2:51
10.	"If I Had It to Do All Over Again"	2:21
11.	"Get On Home"	2:02
12.	"No Other Song"	2:20
Total length:		16:06
