= Bill Belew =

American costume designer (1931–2008

- Born: William Lewis Belew; May 20, 1931; Crozet, Virginia, U.S.
- Died: January 7, 2008 (aged 76); Desert Regional Medical Center, Palm Springs, California, U.S.
- Education: Parsons School of Design in New York
- Occupation: Fashion designer
- Known for: Elvis Presley's costumes and personal wardrobe from 1968 until Presley's death in 1977

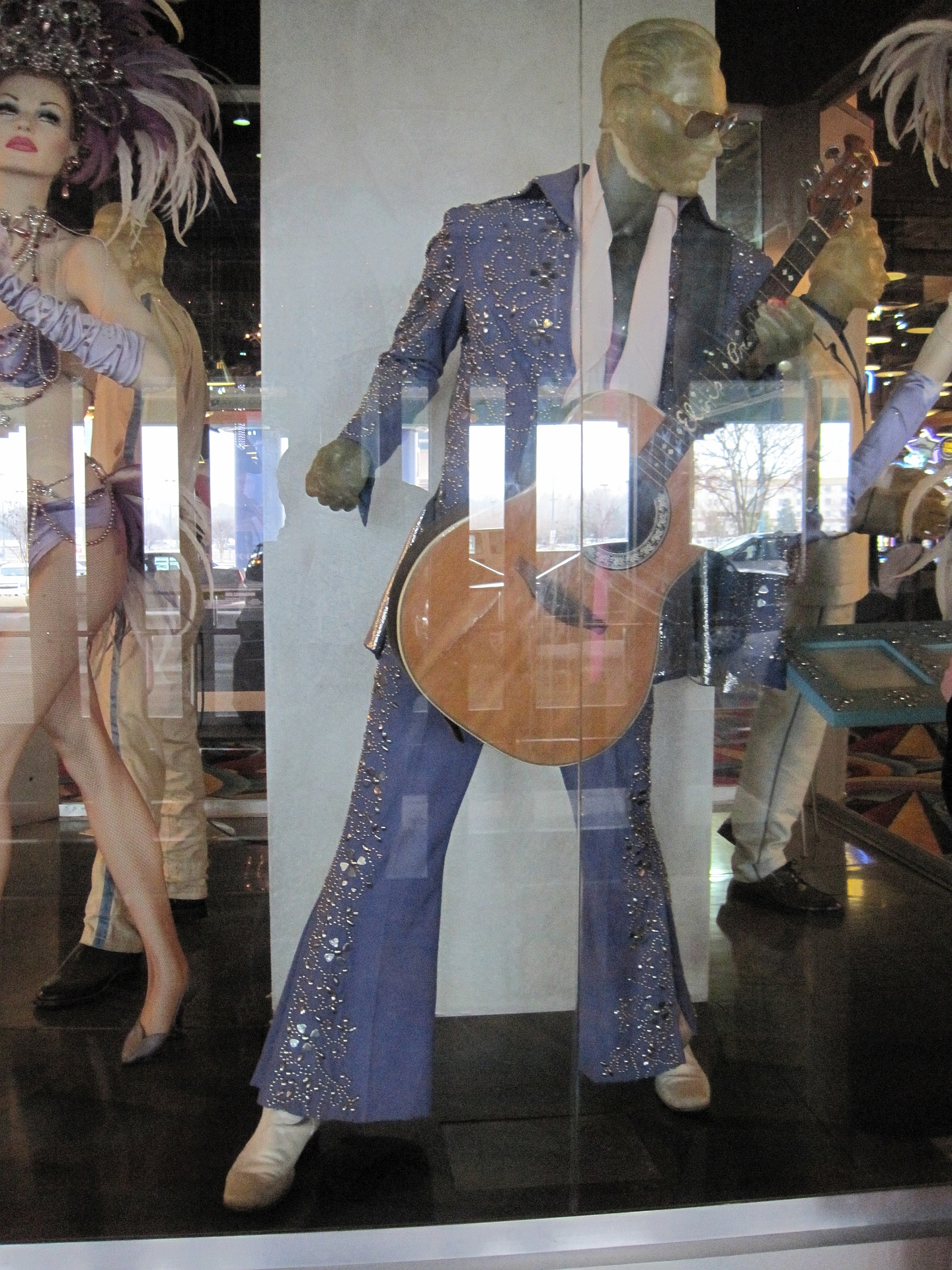
Elvis Presley guitar and jumpsuit designed by Belew

William Lewis Belew (May 20, 1931 – January 7, 2008) was an American costume designer who created stage outfits worn, among others, by Elvis Presley, Ella Fitzgerald, The Band, Gladys Knight, Gloria Estefan, Josephine Baker, Brooke Shields, Joan Rivers, Dionne Warwick, the Osmonds, and the Jacksons. It was Josephine Baker who encouraged Belew to work as a costume designer.

While he made costumes for plays, musicals, operas, ballets, TV specials and TV series, Belew is particularly famous for the stage outfits he made for Elvis. He created the tight-fitting black leather outfit that Elvis wore in the 1968 NBC Comeback Special, and the bell-bottomed jumpsuit outfits with high Napoleonic collars, pointed sleeve cuffs, wide belts and capes, decorated with gems, metal and rhinestone studding, sequins and embroidery. Belew also designed the suit Elvis is wearing on the famous photo of President Nixon and him in the Oval Office, a velveteen outfit originally designed for Elvis to use in his Las Vegas shows. Of the collars, Belew has explained that they were inspired by Napoleon's wardrobe and that he chose them because they would frame and draw attention to Presley's face.

In an interview Belew explained why most of the jumpsuits were white:

The lighting [in Las Vegas] was still in its early stages. And we found that the color that worked the best was white. It allowed them to change the colors on him, where as black would absorb all the color. And it was hard to highlight him. And we experimented with blue which was one of his favorite colors. Red. But it just ended up that white was the best thing and, of course, you know, you want the star to be the person, you know, and not the wardrobe.

During the 1970s Belew designed Presley's offstage wardrobe, as well.

Among the most famous of Belew's Elvis jumpsuits is the American Eagle (created for the 1973 Aloha from Hawaii via Satellite). In 2008, the Peacock suit was sold at an online auction for $300,000. This made it then the most expensive piece of Elvis clothing sold at auction. Another of his creations, the so called “Aqua Blue Vine” broke that record selling for US$325,000 at a 2016 Graceland organized auction.

The elaborate embroidery, which was getting a more prominent role on the jumpsuits in 1974–1977, was the work of Gene Doucette.

In the 1970s, Bill Belew was in big demand. He was busy doing television shows and movies, so he would give Gene the blank suits and Gene would design them himself. Gene designed most of the suits from 1972 until Elvis' death. He designed the more elaborate suits such as the Aloha, Peacock, Sundial, Tiger, and American Eagle.

Belew died at the age of 76 from diabetes-related complications in Palm Springs, California.
