= Hilton Hawaiian Village =

Hotel resort at Waikiki, Honolulu, Hawaii, USA

Coordinates: 21.282656°N 157.837389°W

Hilton Hawaiian Village Waikiki Beach Resort
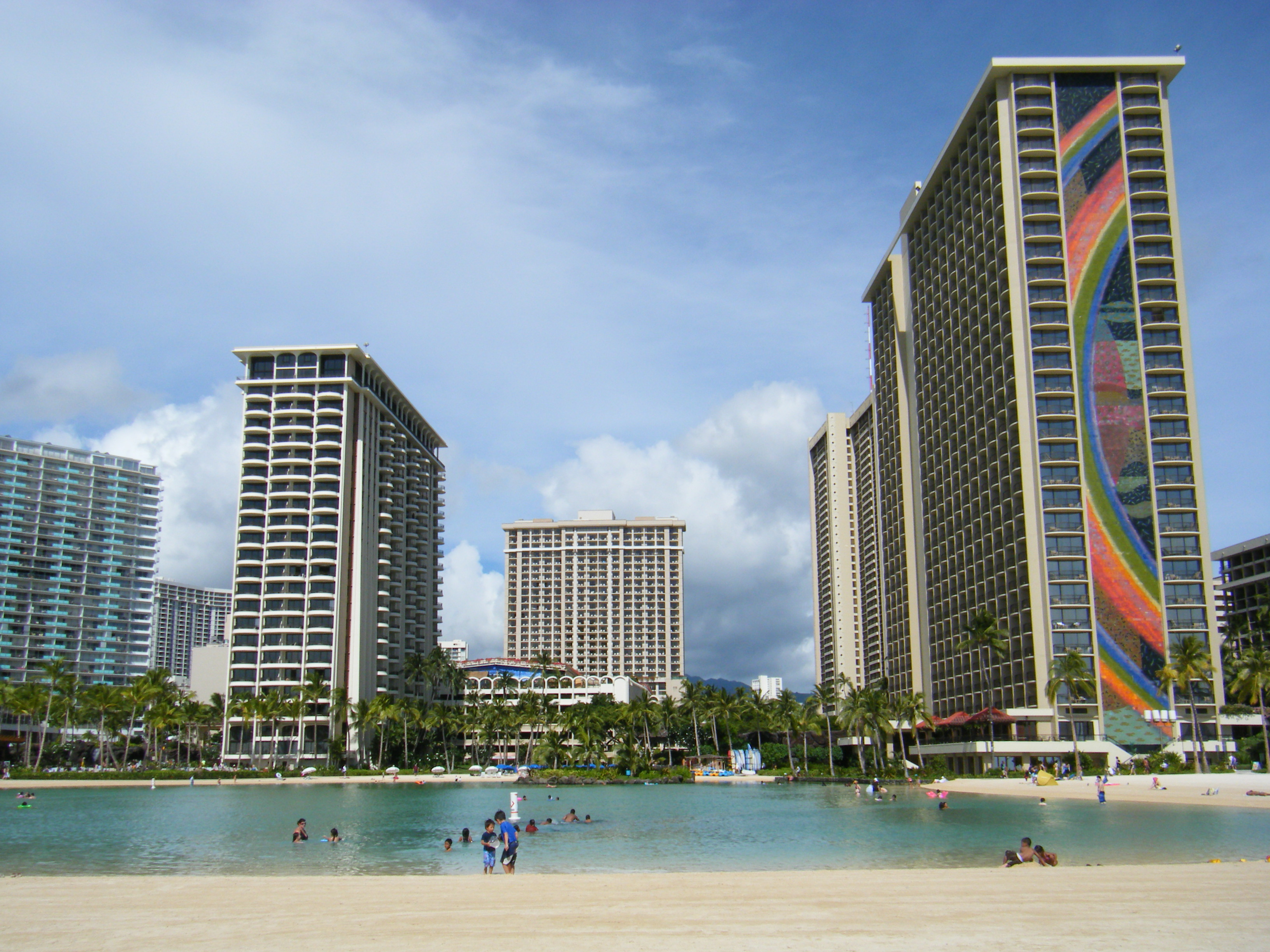
- Hilton Hawaiian Village
- Hotel chain: Hilton Hotels & Resorts

General information
- Location: Honolulu, Hawaii, United States, 2005 Kalia Road
- Opening: September 5, 1955; 71 years ago
- Owner: Park Hotels & Resorts
- Operator: Hilton Worldwide

Design and construction
- Architect: Edwin L. Bauer
- Main contractor: Fritz B. Burns

Other information
- Number of rooms: 3,386

Website
- hiltonhawaiianvillage.com

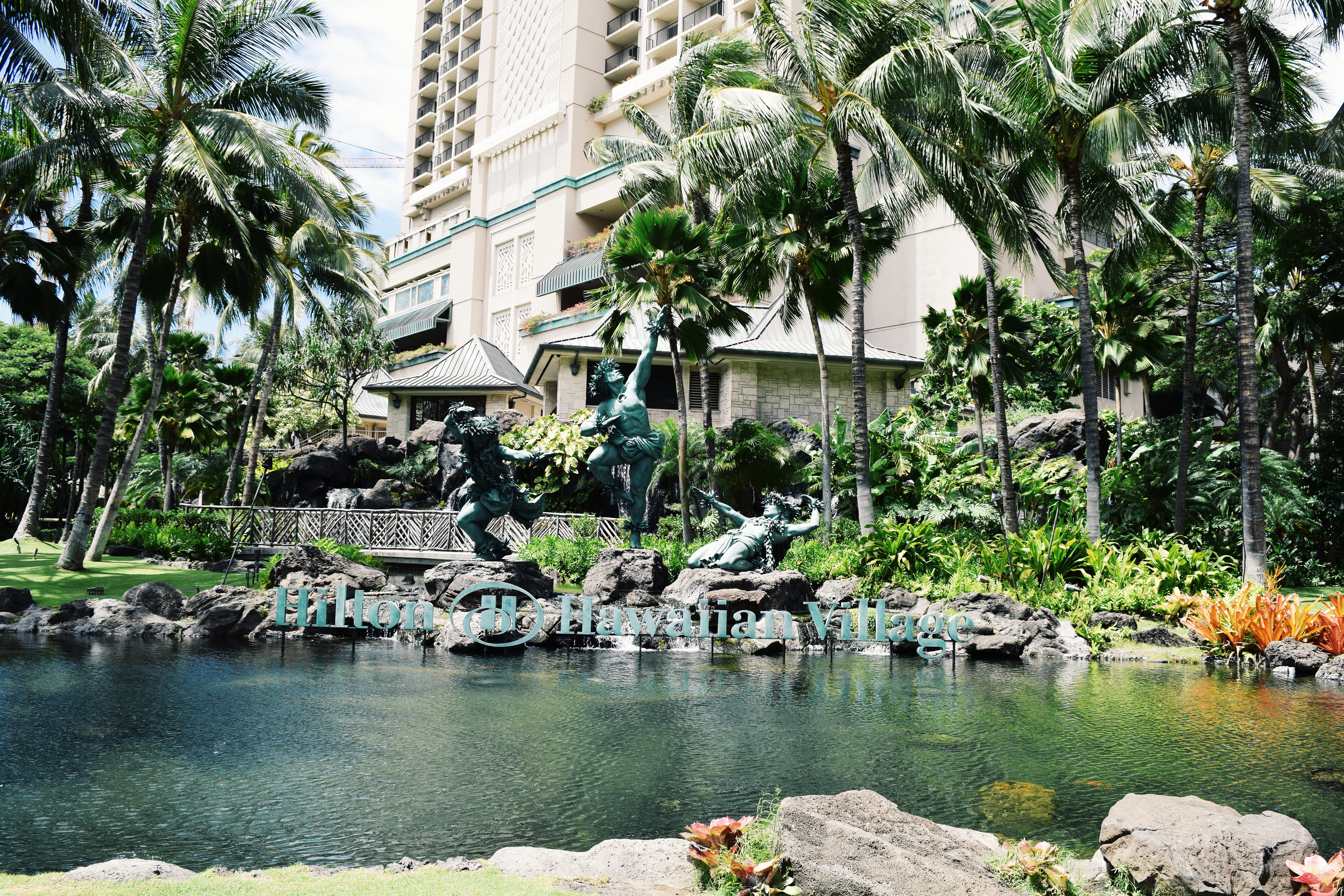
Hilton Hawaiian Village sign (2015)

The Hilton Hawaiian Village Waikiki Beach Resort is a resort hotel on Waikiki Beach in Honolulu, Hawaii. The resort first opened in 1955, and since has grown to become the largest in the Hilton chain of hotels. It is one of largest hotels in the world and the largest in the US outside of Las Vegas.

== Pre-history ==
Located on the Hawaiian island of O'ahu. The site was the former village of Kālia, which had many ancient aquaculture fishponds. It was later part of the former Bernice Pauahi Bishop estate (until 1912), and was also the childhood home of Duke Kahanamoku and his many cousins from the Paoa family.

The portion of the Bishop estate nearest the ocean beach was developed around 1900 as a small hotel, named the Old Waikiki; then redeveloped in 1928 as the Niumalu Hotel.

== History ==
=== Hawaiian Village Hotel (1955–1960) ===
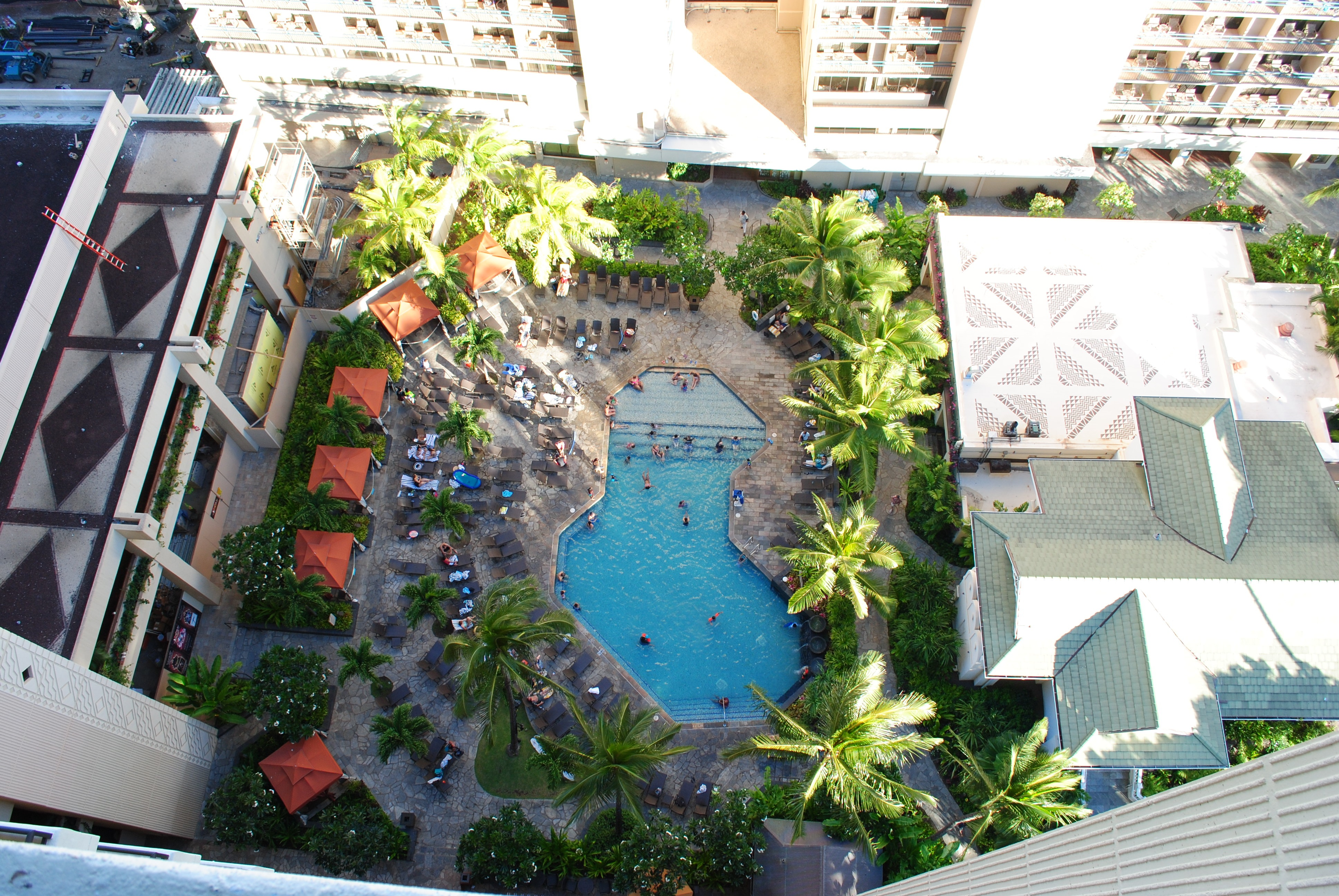
View from the Tapa Tower (2014)

The Hawaiian Village Hotel was conceived, constructed and first administered by Henry J. Kaiser, the same industrialist who built the Hoover Dam and Grand Coulee Dam and founded the Kaiser Permanente health system.

In 1954, Kaiser and developer Fritz B. Burns bought the 16 acres (6.5 ha) Kalia estate of John Ena Jr. and combined it adjacent properties, including the Niumalu Hotel, to construct the Hawaiian Village, converting the flat to a lagoon. They built thatched-roof cottages with 70 guest rooms, The Tapa Room, gardens and three swimming pools and the hotel opened on September 15, 1955. On May 1, 1956, Western Hotels assumed management of the Hawaiian Village Hotel. In 1957, the modern Ocean Tower and the Geodesic Dome were added.

=== Hilton Hotels and Resorts ===
Conrad Hilton bought half of the resort from Henry J. Kaiser in 1961. Hilton Hotels & Resorts assumed management on February 1, 1961, renaming the resort the Hilton Hawaiian Village. It cost $21.5 million USD when it was purchased in 1961, which was considered an unusually high price. Elvis Presley stayed at the hotel soon after while filming Blue Hawaii. Elvis would later hold his Aloha From Hawaii concert at this hotel in 1973, making this hotel the home of the first ever worldwide satellite concert. In 1968, the resort's iconic Rainbow Tower opened, with the world's largest and tallest ceramic tile mosaic on its facade, an image of a rainbow measuring 26 feet wide and 286 feet tall, which required over 16,000 individual tiles. The Tapa Tower was added in 1982, and the original Ocean Tower was gutted and rebuilt in 1987, with the addition of two floors, at which point it was renamed the Ali'i Tower. The 25-story Kalia Tower was added in 2001.

The hotel might be best known as the location for the popular TV series Hawaiian Eye, which aired on ABC from 1959 to 1963. (The purchase by Hilton was duly noted by the changed signage in 1961.) However, only second-unit footage was filmed there; the bulk of the series was shot at Warner Bros.' studio in Burbank.

In 1999, The Hilton Hawaiian Village was used as a taping location for two weeks of Wheel of Fortune episodes. It would again be used for taping sessions in 2001.

In 2006, Hilton Hotels received $25 million in settlement of its lawsuit over toxic mold grown in the Hilton Hawaiian Village's Kalia Tower. Then, in 2015, the hotel was inducted into Historic Hotels of America, the official program of the National Trust for Historic Preservation.

From 2010 to 2020, Hilton partnered with CBS to use the Hilton Hawaiian Village as a frequent backdrop for the TV show Hawaii Five-0. Numerous episodes include scenes shot in various rooms, suites, bars, restaurants, and pools at the resort, including the Duke Kahanamoku Lagoon.

Today, the Hilton Hawaiian Village Hotel sits on over 22 acres (8.9 ha) of beachfront property, near the Ala Moana Center. It features the largest swimming pool in Waikiki, over twenty-two restaurants, exotic wildlife, and botanical gardens, Duke's Lagoon and historical exhibits on loan from the Bishop Museum.

=== 2024 strike ===
On September 24, 2024, 1,800 employees at the hotel went on strike. On November 4, 2024, the strike ended after the over 1,800 striking workers, all of whom where members of UNITE HERE Local 5, voted to ratify a new labor contract. The striking workers returned to work by November 6, 2024.

== Village plan ==
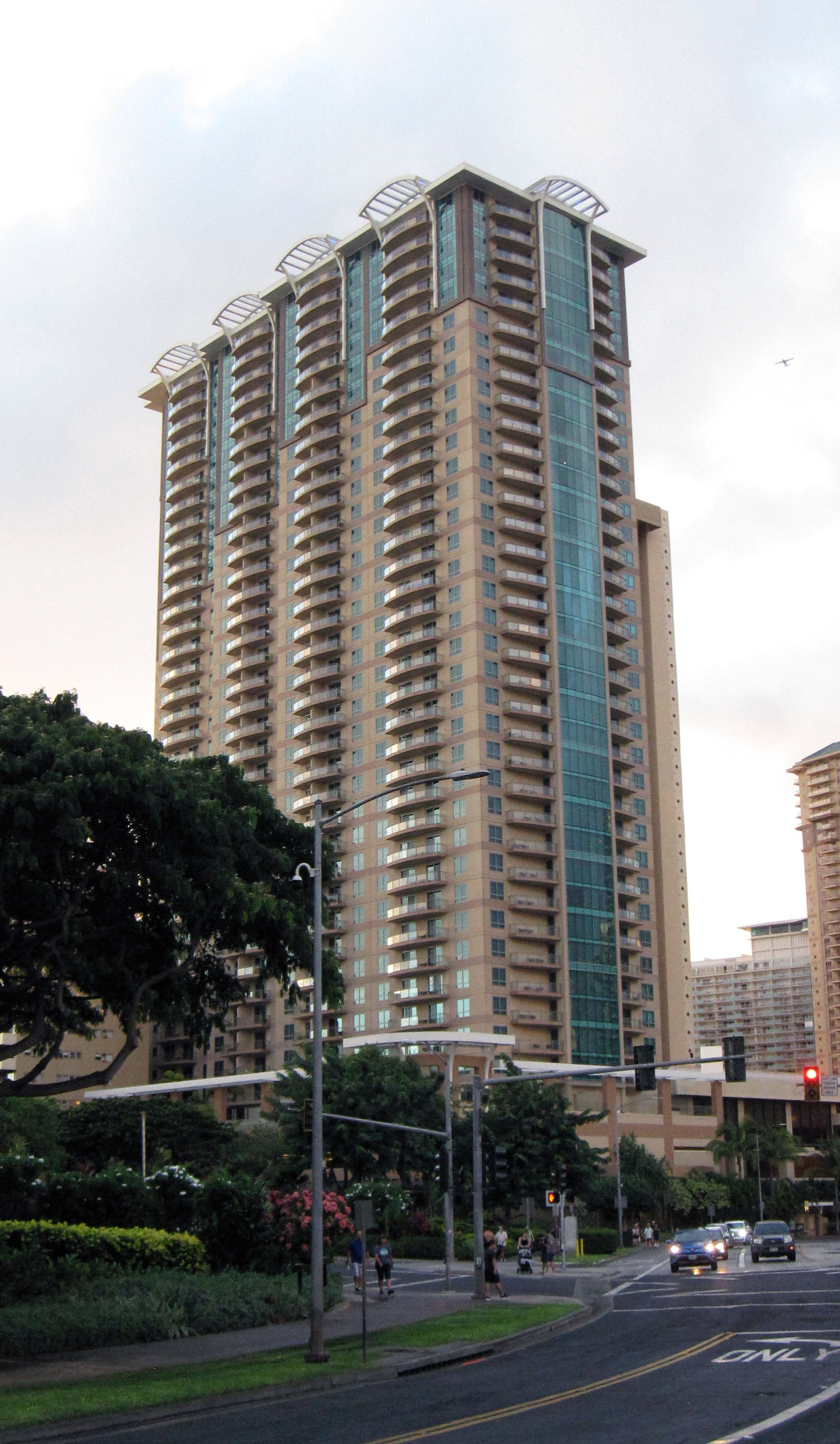
The Grand Islander (2021)

The main concept of the Hawaiian Village was to provide a complete Hawaiian experience for guests without leaving the resort, meaning guests could potentially stay at the resort the whole duration of their stay and be equipped with restaurants, shops, and more.

In building the Hawaiian Village Hotel, Kaiser developed the "village plan" for his resort. In the village plan, various sections of the development were designed in specific types of motifs indicative of the culture of the hotel's surroundings. The various villages in the present-day Hilton Hawaiian Village Beach Resort and Spa surround centerpiece towers: Diamond Head Tower, Ali'i Tower, Tapa Tower, Rainbow Tower, Lagoon Tower, Kalia Tower, Grand Waikikian and Grand Islander. The newest tower is the Grand Islander, which was opened to the public March 1, 2017.

Kaiser's village plan is now used in various layouts of hotels and resorts throughout the world.

== Wildlife ==
The Village Hotel includes a small pond filled with several types of turtles (box and soft-shelled). Other animals that live on the grounds include several types of ducks, lesser flamingos, sacred ibis, black-crowned night herons, koi fish, chameleons, macaws, and parakeets. As of 2014, Hilton Hawaiian Village relocated their 3 remaining South African black-footed penguins to the Maryland Zoo in Baltimore.

== Geodesic dome ==
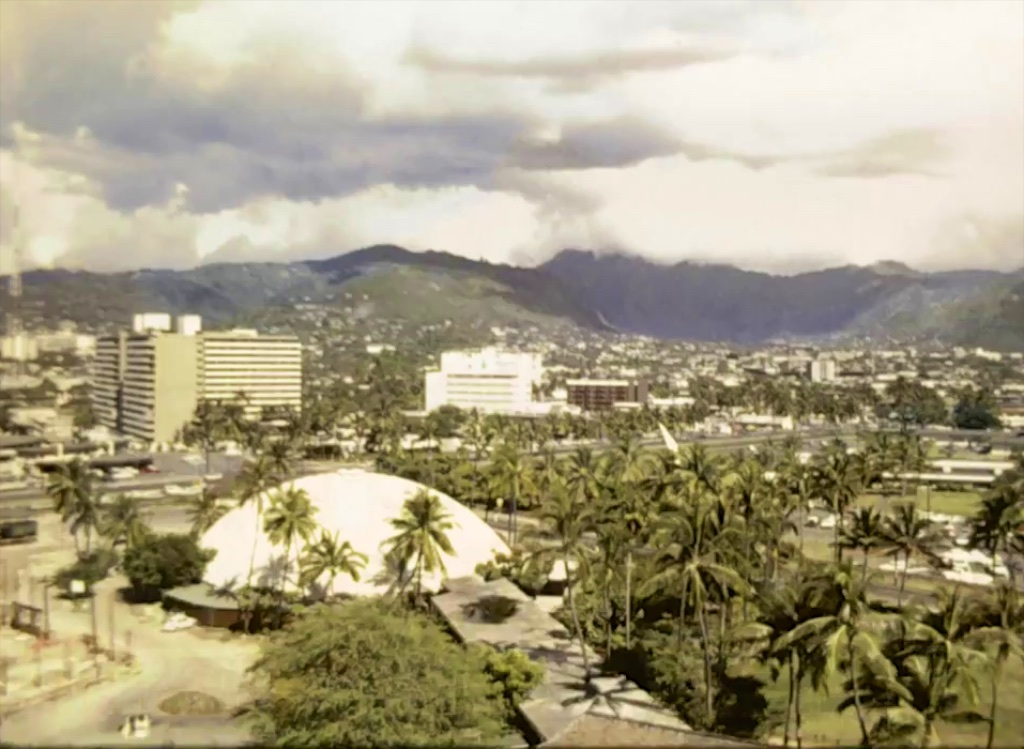
The geodesic dome (1965)

The village was the site one of the earlier geodesic domes constructed in the United States, named the Kaiser Aluminum Dome. It was used as a music and entertainment venue.

Wanting an auditorium at the Honolulu village, Henry Kaiser acquired the license to produce geodesic domes following the design work of Buckminster Fuller. An aluminum-skinned dome with a 145 ft (44 m)-wide span was manufactured at the company's plant in Oakland, California and shipped to Hawaii in 1957. When Kaiser understood that the materials had arrived in Hawaii, he flew from San Francisco to follow the construction — only to discover the building was already complete, having been constructed in only 22 hours.

Many records of the golden age of Exotica, notably most of Arthur Lyman's albums, were recorded at the dome, renowned for its acoustics and natural reverberation. It was demolished in 1999 to make room for the Kalia Tower.

== Gallery ==
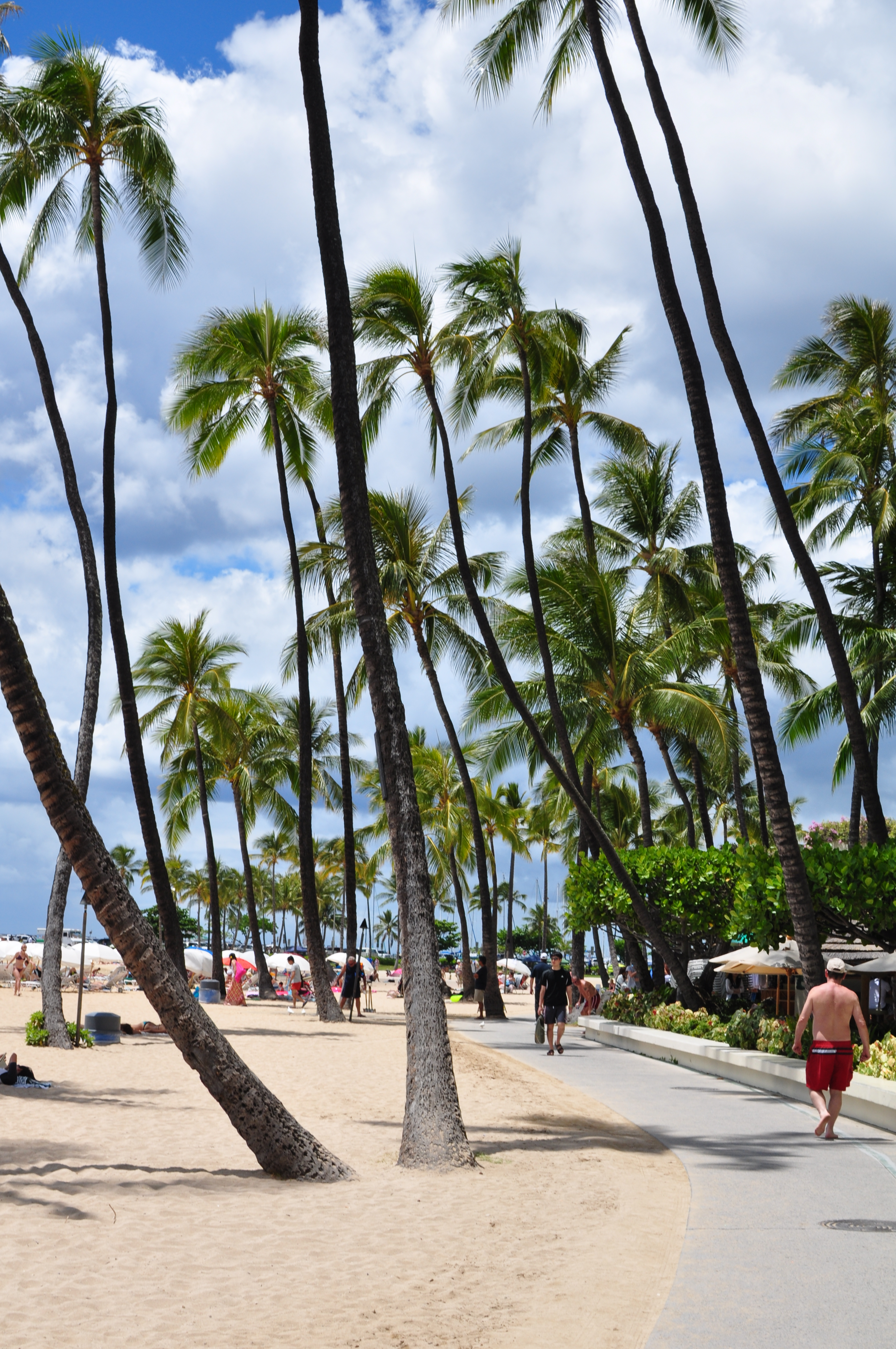
Hilton Hawaiian Village boardwalk

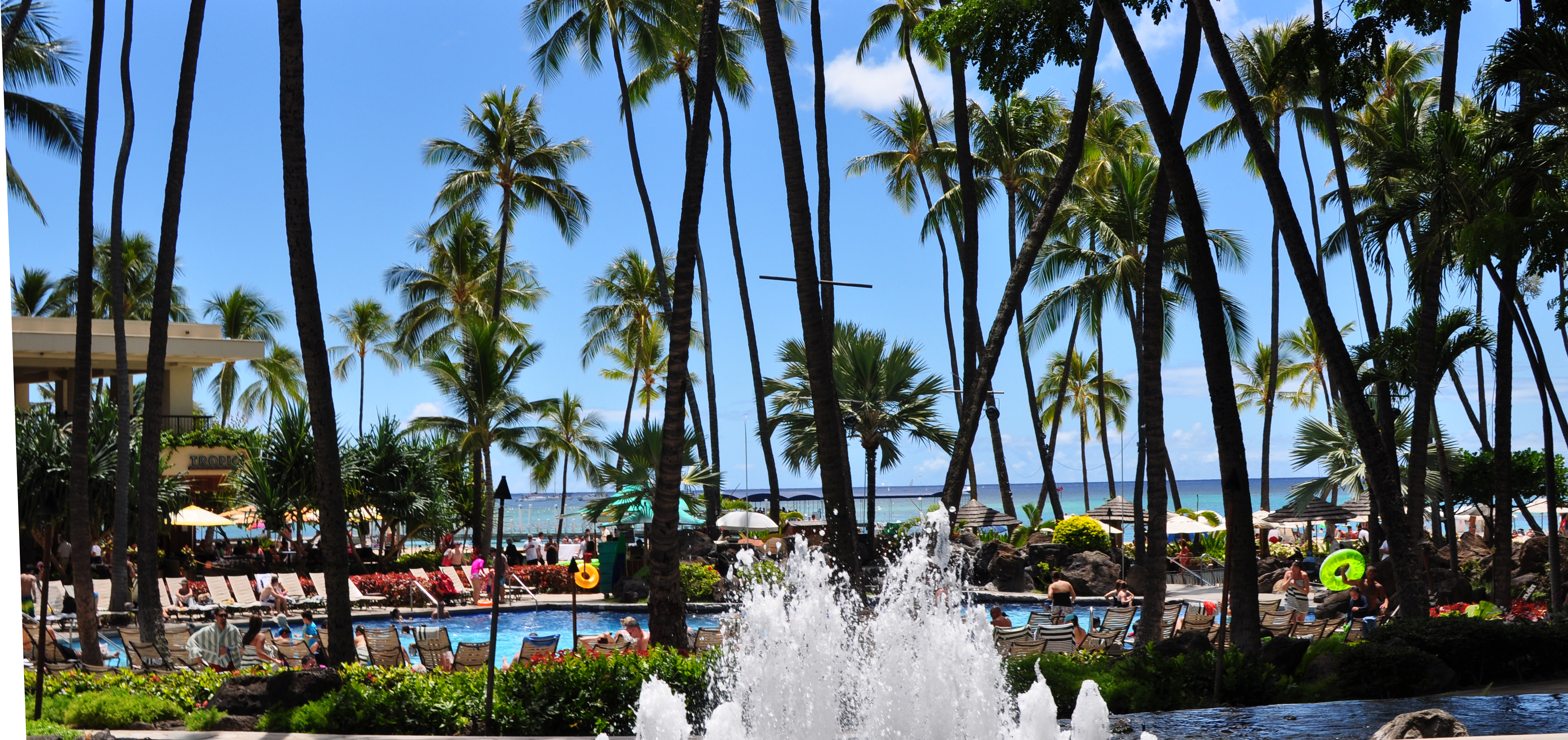
Panorama of Hilton Hawaiian Village

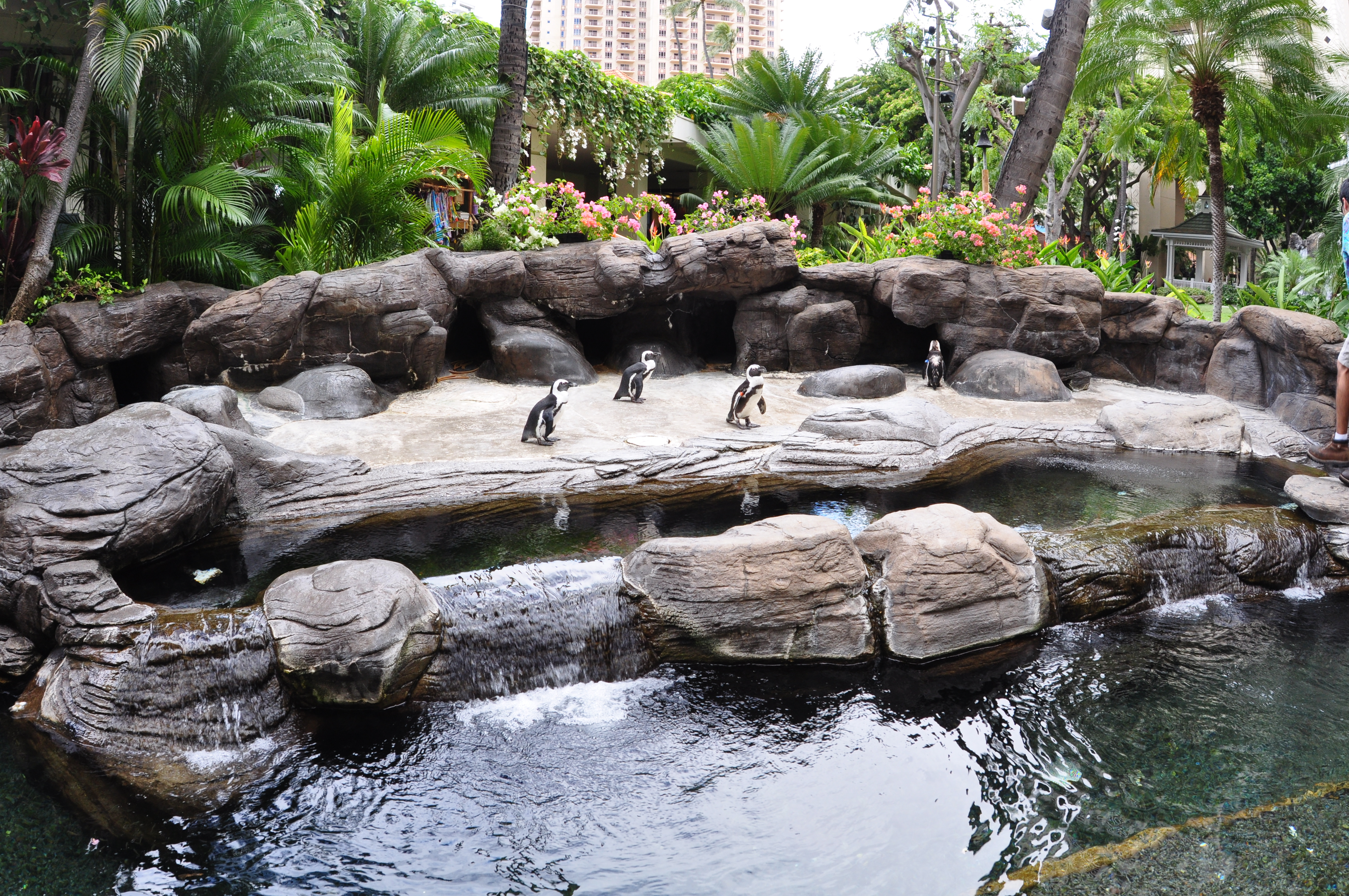
Penguins at the Hilton Hawaiian Village
