= Duke Paoa Kahanamoku Lagoon =

Man-made wading pool in Waikiki, Honolulu, United States

Coordinates: 21.2824°N 157.8394°W

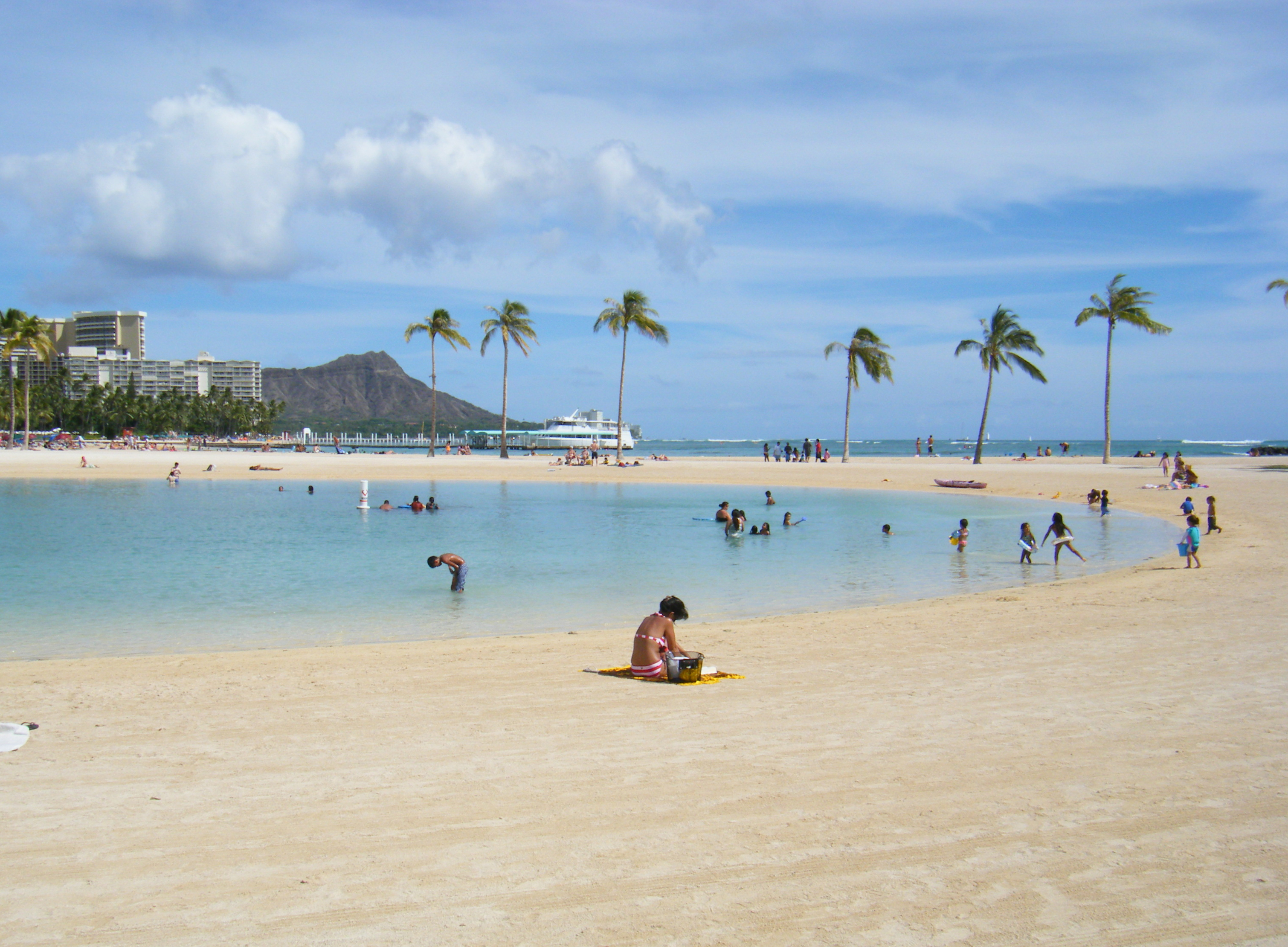
Duke's Lagoon with Diamond Head in the background

Duke Paoa Kahanamoku Lagoon is a small, man-made wading pool in the Waikiki neighborhood of Honolulu, on the south shore of the island of Oʻahu near the Ala Wai Small Boat Harbor and Fort DeRussy Military Reservation. The Hilton Hawaiian Village is adjacent to the lagoon.

== History ==
The lagoon was developed in the 1950s along with Henry J. Kaiser's Hawaiian Village development project. Once completed, the new beach and lagoon were named after surfer and Olympic swimming champion Duke Kahanamoku. In 1961, Hilton Hotels acquired Kaiser's Hawaiian Village Resort property.

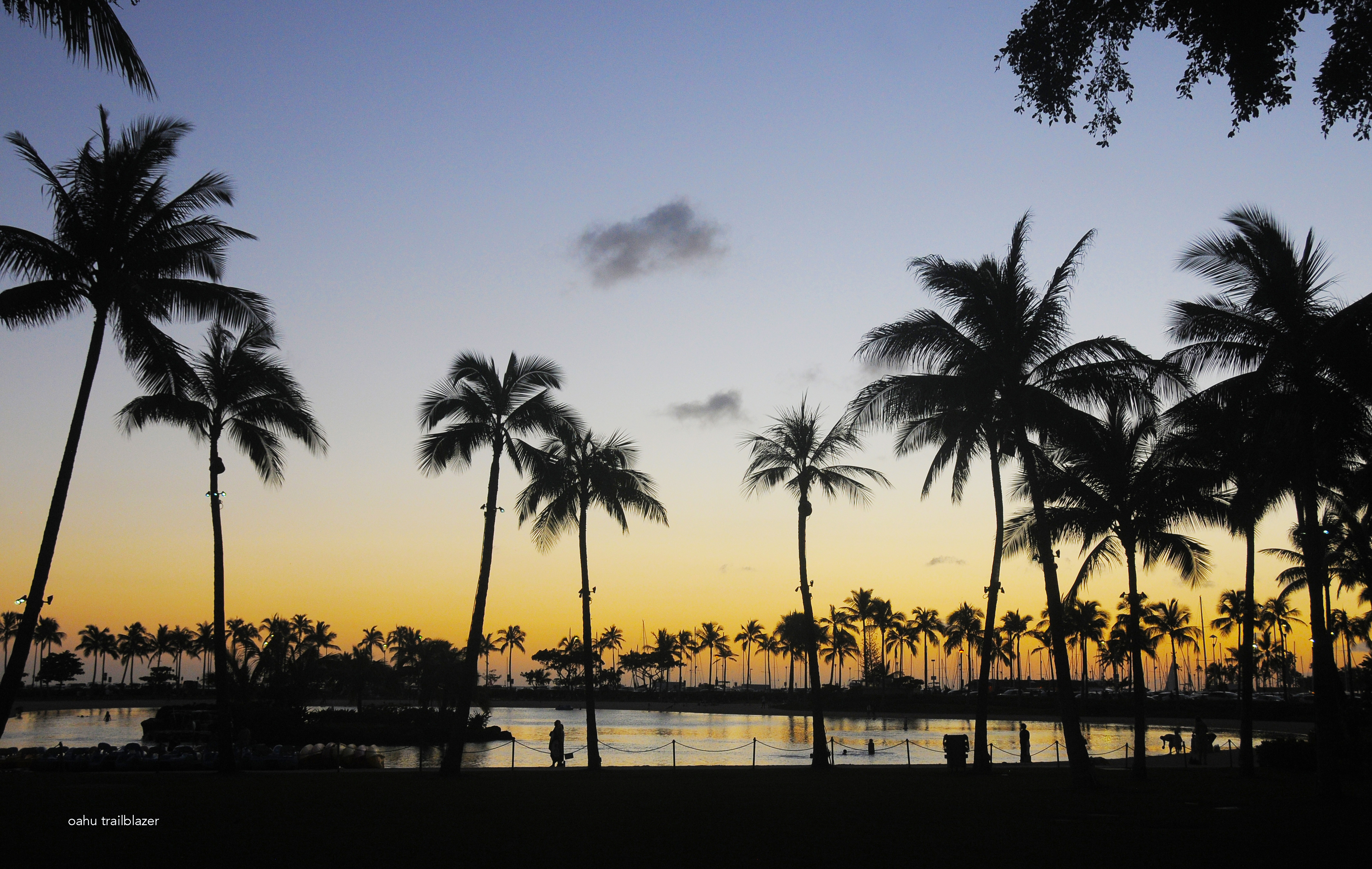
Duke Kahanamoku Lagoon

== Beautification Project ==
As the lagoon aged, it became murky, stagnant and undesirable for swimming. In 2006 the lagoon underwent renovations for approximately $15 million.

With introduction of a new water circulation system, smaller size and shallower waters, the pond became a desirable swimming spot for many. The renovations also incorporated a small island, palm trees, and a boardwalk. On October 16, 2007, the lagoon was officially re-opened with a ceremony attended by Hawaii Lieutenant Governor Duke Aiona and relatives of Duke Kahanamoku.

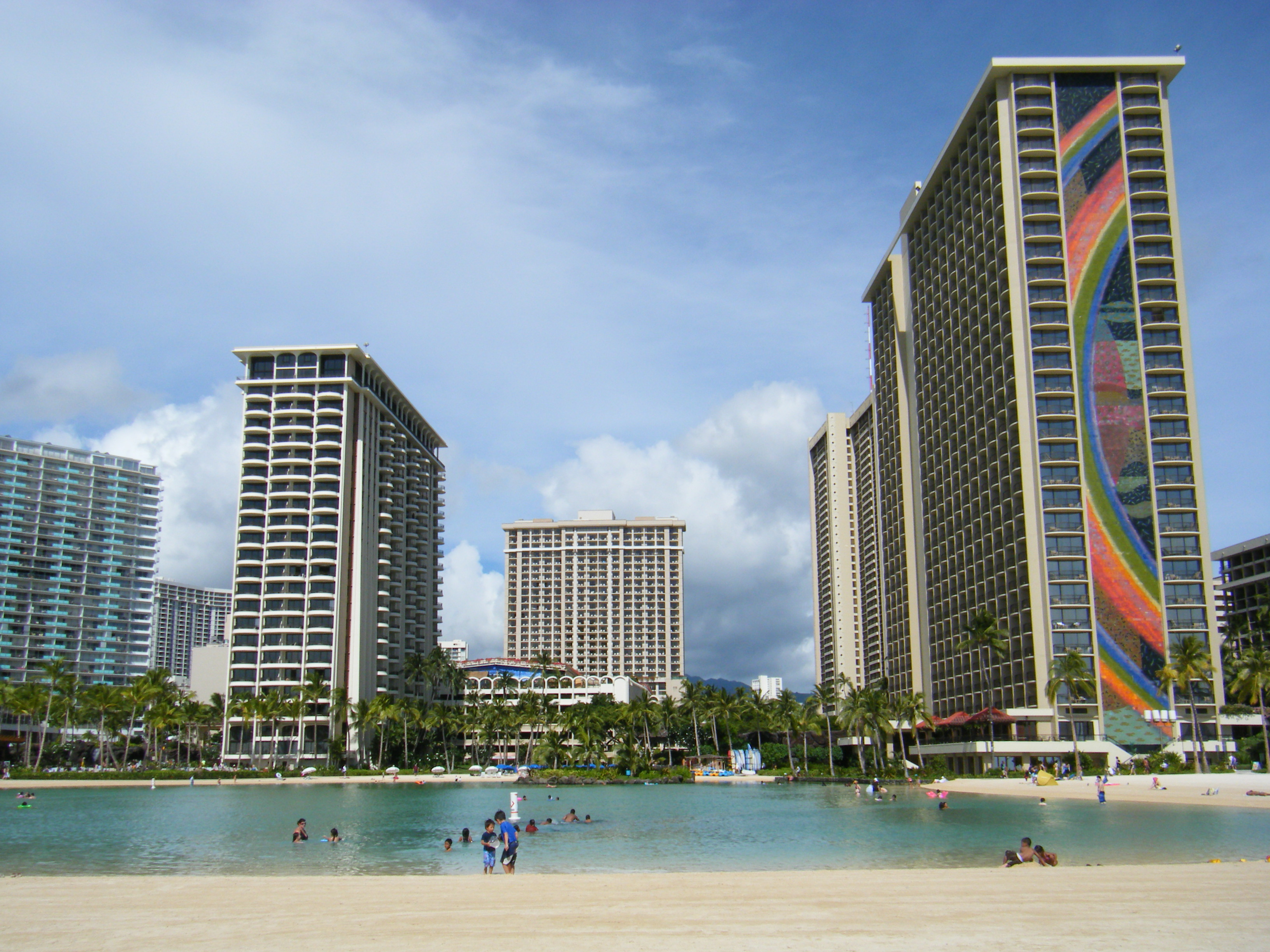

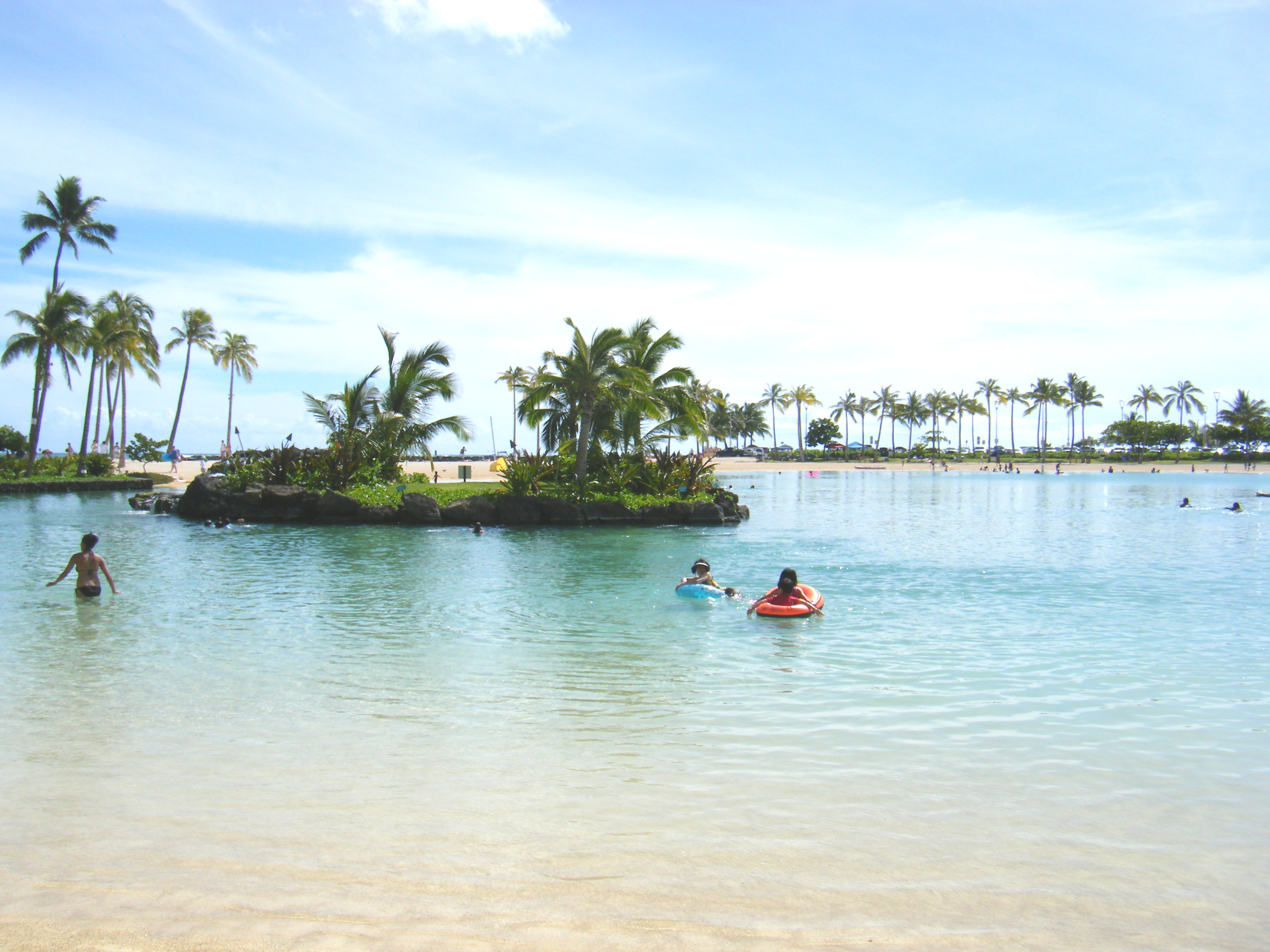

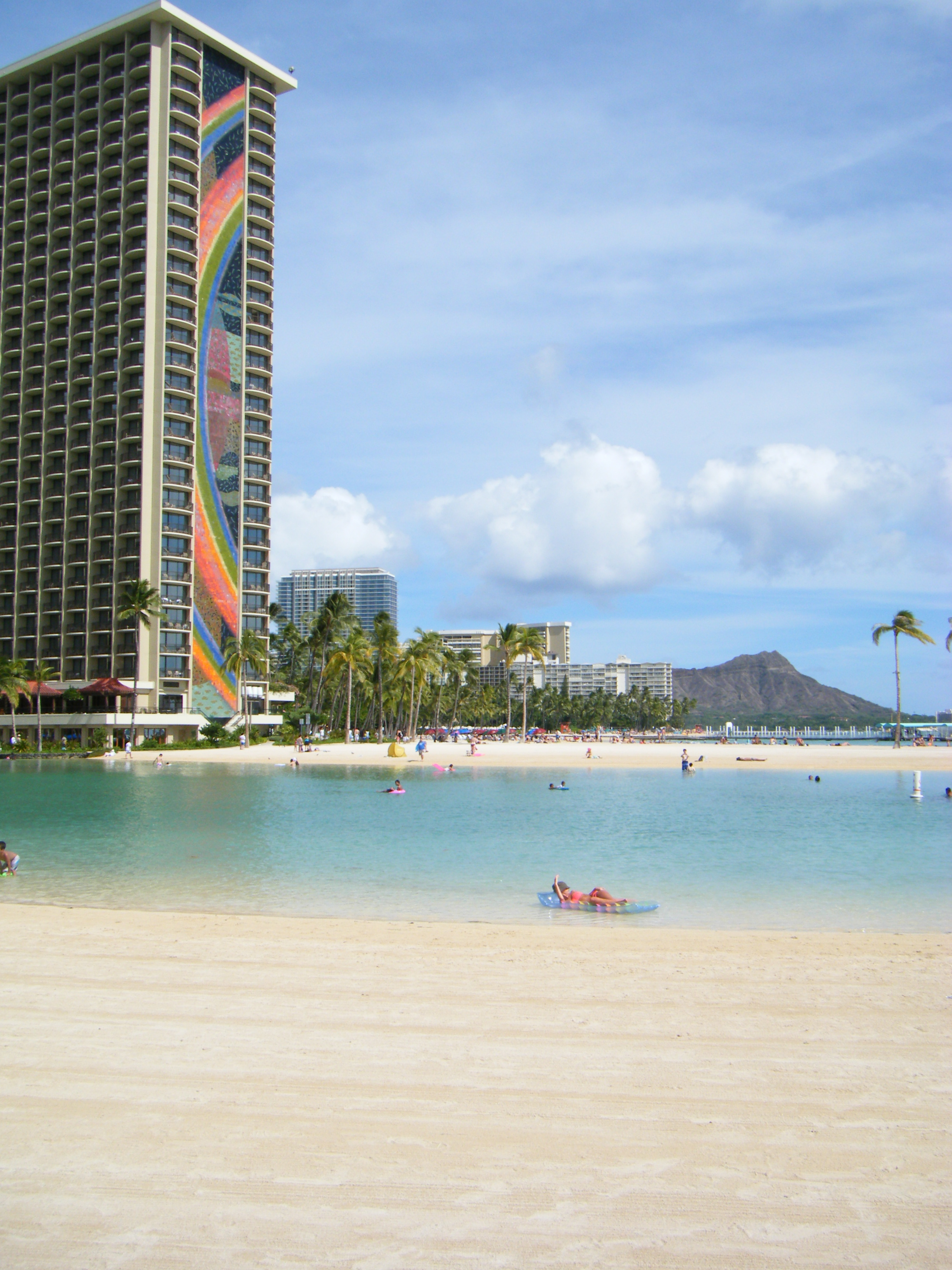

== See also ==
- Ala Moana Beach Park
- U. S. Army Museum of Hawaii
- List of beaches in Oahu
- Magic Island
