= I'll Remember You =

Song by Don Ho

from the album The Don Ho Show!
- B-side: "E Lei Ka Lei Lei (Beach Party Song)"
- Released: 1965
- Length: 2:35
- Label: Reprise
- Songwriter: Kui Lee
- Producer: Sonny Burke

"I'll Remember You" is a song written by Kui Lee in 1964. After he returned to Hawaii from the mainland United States in 1961, Lee worked at the night club Honey's as a doorman. Lee taught himself to sing, and he started to compose songs. He convinced Don Ho, the son of the owner, to let him perform at the club.

Ho liked Lee's original composition "I'll Remember You". He sang it at his live shows, and he eventually recorded his own version. Ho enjoyed success on the mainland, and Lee's composition became popular. It was recorded by multiple acts, including Andy Williams and Elvis Presley. Thanks to its success, Lee was hired to play at the Queen's Surf night club in Hawaii. Lee's own version was released on his debut album The Extraordinary Kui Lee.

== Background ==
Following his stint as a knife dancer in the mainland United States, Kui Lee returned to Hawaii in 1961. Lee and his wife worked at the club Honey's. Initially, Lee worked as a doorman. Though discouraged by his wife, he taught himself to sing. Eventually, he persuaded Honey's main act, singer Don Ho to let him perform at the club. Soon after, Lee began composing his own songs. He wrote "I'll Remember You" after his wife left him, and moved to live with her sister in New Jersey in 1963. Lee's wife later returned to him. He needed four hours to compose the song.

By 1964 Lee had been diagnosed with cancer. During a gathering with friends at Ho's apartment, he revealed his recent diagnosis, and later sung his new composition for the present. Ho then proceeded to ask Lee to sing the song repeatedly for him for the next four hours, to be able to capture his feelings, and his exact interpretation of the number. Without sleeping, Ho drove to the Duke club to work the arrangements of the song with his band, The Ali'is. He included the song on his set that night, and invited Lee to join him onstage to perform it after introducing him.

== Recordings ==
Ho was at the time signed by Reprise Records. In 1965, the label released his version of "I'll Remember You" with "E Lei Ka Lei Lei (Beach Party Song)" as the flipside. Don McDiarmid became the publisher of the song, and responsible for its distribution on the mainland. Eddie Suzuki, Lee's manager, signed him to play regular appearances at the nightclub Queen's Surf in Honolulu. Lee had his debut night on October 22, 1965. Lee received an intense ovation for his performance of "I'll Remember You". He was acclaimed for his appearances at the club, and he attracted large crowds to Queen's Surf.

"I'll Remember You"
Lee's version of his self-written song

McDiarmid offered the song to Andy Williams, who released a version, and performed it on his television show in December. By 1966, Elvis Presley recorded his own version. It featured an introduction with Spanish guitar. The scratch vocals were initially recorded by Presley's bodyguard Red West. Presley later recorded his track that closely followed Ho's style. For the ending of the song, a chorus composed by Millie Kirkham, June Page and Dolores Eagan joined Presley. By the time of Lee's death, in December 1966 there were twenty-eight versions of the song by different artists. Lee's own version was released the day before his death with the album The Extraordinary Kui Lee. By the end of December, Roger Williams' version peaked at twenty-four on the Billboard Hot 100. Ho included a newly recorded version of "I'll Remember You" on his 1968 album, The Don Ho Show. The Honolulu Advertiser called it a "palatable piece with charming vibrance", but remarked that the new version of the song "suffer(ed) in revival without the vocal manipulations of the Aliis".

New York Times called it "one of the most enduring Hawaiian standards". Tommy Sands performed the song in the 1968 Hawaii Five-O episode "No Blue Skies". Presley included the song in his live sets from 1972. He sang it on his live television special, Aloha from Hawaii Via Satellite, a benefit concert for the Kui Lee Cancer Fund. "I'll Remember You" remained on his sets until the summer of 1976. Other artists that recorded the song included Tony Bennett, Tennessee Ernie Ford, and Connie Francis.
