= Intelsat IV F-4 =

Geostationary communications satellite

- Mission type: Communications
- Operator: Intelsat
- COSPAR ID: 1972-003A
- SATCAT no.: 05775
- Mission duration: 7 years (planned)

Spacecraft properties
- Bus: HS-312
- Manufacturer: Hughes Aircraft
- Launch mass: 1,414 kilograms (3,117 lb)
- BOL mass: 730 kilograms (1,610 lb)

Start of mission
- Launch date: January 23, 1972, 00:12:04 UTC
- Rocket: Atlas SLV-3D Centaur-D
- Launch site: Cape Canaveral LC-36B

Orbital parameters
- Reference system: Geocentric
- Regime: Geostationary
- Eccentricity: 0.71954
- Perigee altitude: 602 kilometers (374 mi)
- Apogee altitude: 36,418 kilometers (22,629 mi)
- Inclination: 21.8°
- Period: 651.3 minutes
- Epoch: January 23, 1972

Transponders
- Band: 12 IEEE C-band
- Bandwidth: 36 MHz

Intelsat IV F-4 was a geostationary communication satellite built by Hughes, it was owned by Intelsat. The satellite was based on the HS-312 platform and its estimated useful life was 7 years.

== History ==
The Intelsat IV F-4 was part of the Intelsat IV series which consisted of eight communications satellites, launched from Cape Canaveral during the early 1970s, marked the fifth generation of geostationary communications satellites developed by the Hughes Aircraft Company since 1963 with the launch of Syncom II, the world's first synchronous satellite. The Syncom II was 15 cm high and 28 inches in diameter, weighing 78 Lbs in orbit. In contrast, the Intelsat IVs weighed more than 1,300Lbs (595 kg) into orbit and were more than 17 feet (5.2 meters) in diameter. All seven satellites exceeded their projected life expectancies and were withdrawn from active duty, the last of which, the Intelsat IV F-1 was retired in October 1987.

The satellite was equipped with 12 C-band transponders. It had 6,000 two-way relay phone calls or broadcast 12 concurrent color television programs or mixed combinations of communications traffic including data and fax.

The satellite had 12 channels of broadband communication. Each channel had a bandwidth of 40 MHz and provided about 500 communication circuits.

On January 14, 1973, it was used for the broadcast of Elvis Presley's live concert Aloha from Hawaii via Satellite.

== Launch ==
The satellite was successfully launched into space on January 23, 1972, at 00:12:04 UTC, by means of an Atlas SLV-3D Centaur-D vehicle from the Cape Canaveral Air Force Station in Florida, United States. It had a launch mass of 1,414 kg.

== See also ==
- 1972 in spaceflight
