= Kui Lee =

American singer-songwriter (1932–1966)

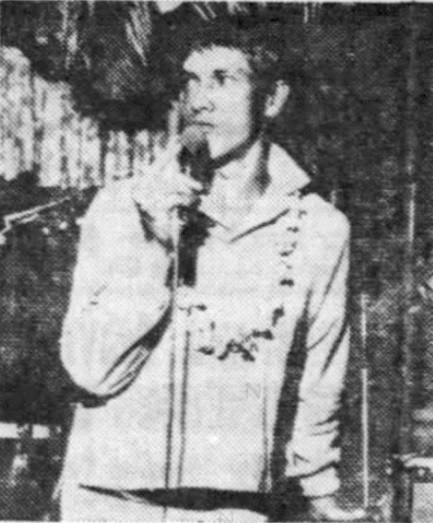
- Kui Lee performing at Kalia Gardens in Honolulu, 1965

Background information
- Also known as: Kui Lee
- Born: Kuiokalani Lee; July 31, 1932; Shanghai, Republic of China
- Died: December 3, 1966 (aged 34) Tijuana, Baja California, Mexico
- Genres: Hawaiian music
- Occupations: Singer, songwriter
- Instrument: Vocals
- Years active: 1961-1966
- Labels: Columbia Records, Music of Polynesia

Kuiokalani Lee (July 31, 1932 – December 3, 1966) was an American singer-songwriter. Lee began his career in the mainland United States while performing as a dancer. Upon his return to Hawaii, he worked in clubs. At the Honey club, he met Don Ho, who popularized Lee's compositions. Ho's fame made Lee a local success in Hawaii. Multiple artists then covered his song "I'll Remember You".

Lee was diagnosed with cancer in 1965. While he kept performing, he had two recording sessions. After his death in December 1966, Columbia Records released his debut studio album, The Extraordinary Kui Lee the same month. A part of the Hawaiian Renaissance, the Hawaiʻi Academy of Recording Arts posthumously awarded Lee a Lifetime Achievement award, and he was later inducted into the Hawaiian Music Hall of Fame.

== Early life ==
Kuiokalani Lee was born in Shanghai, China, on July 31, 1932, as his parents were touring China. His father Billy was a singer and his mother Ethel was a singer and dancer. Lee was a descendant of native Hawaiians, Chinese, and Scots. At the age of five, after his mother died, Lee returned to Hawaii with his father who feared the escalating tensions in the area around Shanghai, and the threat of war. In Hawaii, he attended Kamehameha Schools and Roosevelt High School. Lee began to compose songs as a teenager. He was regarded as a quick learner, and an articulate student, but he often missed classes to pursue his hobby of surfing. Because of his continuous misbehavior, he was expelled. Lee then enlisted in the United States Coast Guard and served for two years.

== Career ==
After his stint with the Coast Guard, Lee traveled to the US mainland and became a knife dancer in Los Angeles, New York City, and Puerto Rico. Lee learned by watching experienced Samoan dancers. Eventually, he appeared a number of times on The Ed Sullivan Show. While working at The Lexington Hotel in New York City, Lee met his wife, hula dancer and singer Rose Frances Naone "Nani" Leinani. Lee returned to Hawaii in 1961. His wife found a job performing at Honey's club with Don Ho. Though discouraged by her, Lee then taught himself to sing. He got a job performing at Nawiliwili Beach Park's Club Jetty in Kauai, and worked as a doorman at the Honey club in Kaneohe. Ho, the featured singer whose mother owned the club, began to perform Lee's original songs. He was met with success performing "Ain't No Big Thing", "The Days of My Youth" and "I'll Remember You". Lee convinced Ho to let him perform as a singer at the Honey club. He also appeared at Kalia Gardens and Kanaka Pete's in Lahaina during 1965. By October, Lee was performing at Waikiki's Queen's Surf club. Around that time, he composed "Lahainaluna" and "One Paddle, Two Paddle". Lee earned US$2,000 weekly (equivalent to US$19,800 in 2025) for his club appearances. During an interview with Paradise of the Pacific, Honolulu radio D.J Hal Lewis said of Lee, "Kui is a gold mine for his song-writing alone. His music could be worth $10 to $15 million to him. This kid's ready right now." The same year, Lee signed a five-year recording contract with Music of Polynesia's subsidiary Palm Records. "I'll Remember You" was included on Ho's debut studio album, Don Ho Show, released on Reprise Records. Ho's success increased Lee's local popularity in Hawaii. Other artists soon recorded the song in Spanish, Italian, Japanese, and Tagalog. Tony Bennett, Andy Williams, Herb Alpert & The Tijuana Brass, and Vic Schoen covered it in English.

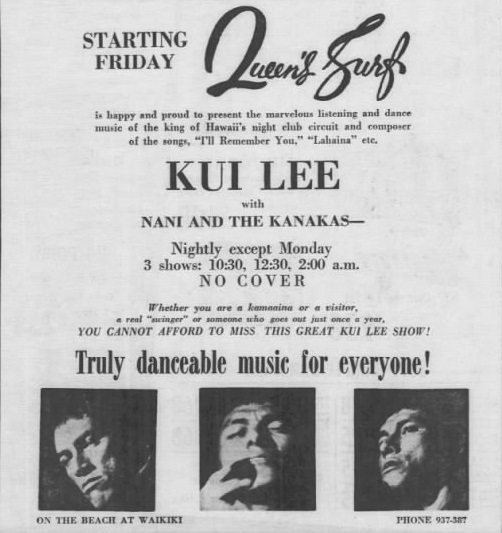
A newspaper ad promoting Lee's performances at Queen's Surf

Lee was diagnosed with lymph gland cancer while working at Kanaka Pete's in 1965. Though he was aware of his health issues, he delayed visiting a physician. He then underwent radiation therapy at Queens Hospital. While being treated for the disease, in March, Lee appeared at the Bora Bora club in San Francisco. He then went to New York City for a recording session with Columbia Records, which released his debut single "Ain't No Big Thing", paired with "All I Want To Do", in May 1965. Around that time, Lee expressed to childhood friend Douglas Mossman his regret towards not graduating from high school. Mossman contacted Richard Lyman, the board chairman of the Bishop Estate, owner of Kamehameha Schools. Lyman issued a graduation certificate to Lee as part of a 1950 promotion, which he received during a ceremony in July 1966. The same month, he began treatment at Memorial Sloan Kettering Cancer Center in New York. While waiting for treatment by a doctor from Sweden, the cancer metastasized to his lungs, and he later entered Cedars of Lebanon Hospital in Los Angeles for lung surgery. His next recording session was for Jack de Mello's label. Because of Lee's condition, de Mello recorded his vocals in bed at the hospital. In August, local artists organized a benefit concert to pay for Lee's medical expenses. On October 18, 1966, Lee played at the Waikiki Shell, during Aloha Week. He used a wheelchair after the surgery and could not sing. Lee apologized to the crowd and told anecdotes, then Nani Lee sang his latest composition "The Intangible Dream Came True". In November 1966, Columbia released "Rain, Rain Go Away" backed with "I'll Remember You".

Eventually, Lee traveled to Tijuana, Mexico, where he sought treatment with laetrile, which was banned by the Food and Drug Administration in the US. Lee favored laetrile, as he opposed cobalt and radiation therapies. Nani Lee stressed in a later interview that though she did not believe in the treatment's effectiveness, and her husband "knew very well what little chance there was", that "he wanted so much to live. He was willing to try anything and everything." Kui Lee died in Tijuana on December 3, 1966, at Guadalajara Hospital. His body was taken to the local Del Carmen funeral home and later flown to Ordensteins Mortuary in Hawaii. Lee expressed his wish to be buried at sea, while a band played his songs. On December 8, 1966, Pastor Abraham Akaka presided over a memorial service at Kawaiahaʻo Church. Honolulu's mayor Neal Blaisdell attended the ceremony and gave a speech. By 1:00 pm, his body and 90 mourners sailed from Kuhio Beach Park on the catamaran Ale-Ale Kai to the burial location 21°15′N 157°49.8′W. It was escorted by nine canoes, followed by other mourners on boats and a surfer. During the procession, loudspeakers played Lee's songs. 10,000 orchids were dropped from a plane to the signal of a flare, and Lee's lei-covered casket was released to waters with a depth of between 500–600 feet (150–180 m).

== Legacy ==
"I'll Remember You"
Lee's style was a blend of popular music of mainland United States and Hawaiian music

Soon after his death, Columbia Records released Lee's debut studio album The Extraordinary Kui Lee in December 1966. In 1970, Music of Polynesia released Lee's recordings on the double album The World of Kui Lee (MOP 12000), with the first disk entitled Words And Music and the second Images Of Kui's World. The label's publisher Mickey Goldsen credited Lee with bridging a generational gap in Hawaiian music. He also expressed his concern to Billboard over the future of the "new wave of Hawaiian composers" following Lee's death. A part of the Hawaiian Renaissance, his fan base regarded him as a "rebel" for departing from the themes in traditional music. During an interview, Lee said that while performing on the mainland early in his career, the mainstream stereotypes of Hawaiian culture, and the adoption of them by his peers on the Islands aggravated him. He declared: "All this commercial garbage has to go". Upon his return to Hawaii, Lee discarded his previous outfit of choice, the suit and tie, and favored informal shirts, while he let his hair grow. In June 1966, a poll published in The Honolulu Advertiser placed him among the most admired people by Hawaii's youth. Lee's followers compared him to James Dean, as the themes of several of his songs dealt with social deception and oligarchy. According to author Adrienne L. Kaeppler, Lee's sound "experimented with a laid-back English balladic style, harmonically and rhythmically complex". It consisted of a blend of jazz, blues, and rock and roll with classic Hawaiian music. Lee had been influenced by the popular music of the time during his stay in the mainland.

Ho organized The Kui Lee Memorial Show at the Waikiki Shell on December 3, 1968. The benefit concert raised money to help Hawaiian musicians. CBS broadcast it on February 7, 1969. Elvis Presley, who recorded a cover of Lee's "I'll Remember You" in the summer of 1966, included the song during his live sets between 1972 and the summer of 1976. In 1973, the proceeds of his concert Aloha from Hawaii Via Satellite benefited the Kui Lee Cancer Fund. It raised US$75,000 (equivalent to $543,900 in 2025). Hawaii newspaper columnist Eddie Sherman had created the fund shortly before the event to assist cancer research at the University of Hawaiʻi. In December 1986, Sherman's musical Kui opened at the Honolulu Community Theater. Originally, Sherman adapted a screenplay for a motion picture, but eventually he settled for a play. The play starred Kimo Kahoano as Kui, and Shaunne Gallipeau as Nani Lee.

In May 2000, the Na Hoku Hanohano Lifetime Achievement Award was given posthumously to Lee. Presented by Ho, Lee's wife and daughters accepted it. In 2009, Lee was inducted into the Hawaiian Music Hall of Fame by the Hawaiʻi Academy of Recording Arts.

== Discography ==
=== Albums ===
Year	Album	Label
1966	The Extraordinary Kui Lee	Columbia Records
1970	The World of Kui Lee	Music of Polynesia

=== Singles ===
Year	Single (A-side, B-side)	Album
1966	"Ain't No Big Thing" b/w "All I Want To Do"	The Extraordinary Kui Lee
1966	"Rain, Rain Go Away" b/w "I'll Remember You"	The Extraordinary Kui Lee
