= La Paloma =

Popular Spanish song

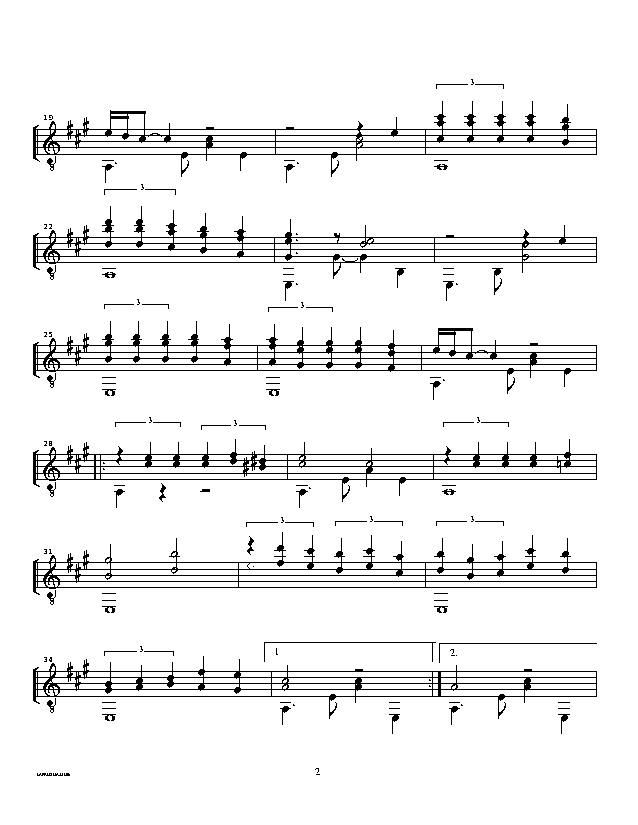
"La Paloma" (excerpt of arrangement)

"La Paloma"
Beniamino Gigli

"La Paloma"
Guitar instrumental

"La Paloma", "The Dove" in English, is a popular Spanish song that has been produced and reinterpreted in diverse cultures, settings, arrangements, and recordings. The song was written by the Spanish Basque composer Sebastián Iradier (previously Yradier) around 1860 after a visit to Cuba. Iradier was to die in obscurity within a few years, never to learn how popular his song would become. It is one of the first written examples of Afro-Cuban "Habanera" rhythm to achieve wide popularity.

In 1879, the song was registered at the copyright office in Madrid as a "Canción Americana con acompañamiento de Piano". Very quickly, "La Paloma" became popular outside of Spain, particularly in Mexico, and soon spread around the world. In many places, including Afghanistan, Cuba, Colombia, Hawaii, the Philippines, Germany, Romania, Venezuela, Zanzibar, and Goa it gained the status of a quasi-folk song. Over the years, the popularity of "La Paloma" has surged and receded periodically, but never subsided. It may be considered one of the first universal popular hits and has appealed to artists of diverse musical backgrounds. There are more than one thousand versions of this song. Together with "Yesterday" by the Beatles it is one of the most-recorded songs in the history of music and certainly the most-recorded Spanish song.

== The dove motif ==
The dove motif of "La Paloma" can be traced back to an episode that occurred in 492 BC, before Darius the Great's invasion of Greece, a time when the white dove had not yet been seen in Europe. The Persian fleet under Mardonius was caught in a storm off the shore of Mount Athos and wrecked, when the Greeks observed white doves escaping from the sinking Persian ships. Those were most probably homing pigeons which the Persian fleet carried with them when sallying forth out of Persia for battle. This inspired the notion that such birds bring home a final message of love from a sailor who is lost at sea.

== History ==
In the Portuguese novel O Crime do Padre Amaro (The Crime of Father Amaro), written in 1871 by the Portuguese writer José Maria de Eça de Queirós, it is referred to as "[l]a Chiquita, an old Mexican song".

German and French versions appeared in the 1860s. Harry James recorded a version in 1941 on Columbia 36146., and a version in English titled "No More" with lyrics by Don Robertson and Hal Blair was recorded by both Dean Martin and Elvis Presley. That version was written by request as an adaptation of an Italian or French folk song with new English lyrics, specifically to be sung by Elvis in the movie Blue Hawaii. It was based on musical melody as remembered, and had lyrics fit to the melody which emerged during composition. In 1961, American singer Connie Francis cut a French recording of the song entitled "Jamais", which became a top-10 single for her in Canada and France. A cover version by Brendan Bowyer reached No. 1 in the Irish Singles Chart in 1963.

In 1973 French singer Mireille Mathieu had a huge hit across Europe with her interpretation named "La Paloma, Adieu", released outside the francophonie countries as "La Paloma, Adé".

"La Paloma" has been interpreted by musicians of diverse backgrounds including opera, pop, jazz, rock, military bands, and folk music. The song entered the Guinness Book of World Records being sung by the largest choir, 88,600 people, in Hamburg on May 9, 2004.

== Movies ==
La Paloma, 1930 cartoon

"La Paloma" is played in these movies:

- The Gallopin' Gaucho, 1928
- "La Paloma" Screen Songs cartoon, 1930
- The Private Life of Don Juan, 1934
- La Paloma, Ein Lied der Kameradschaft, 1934 (also listed as La Paloma, 1938)
- Juarez, 1939
- Große Freiheit Nr. 7, 1945, Hans Albers singing a German version. The film was not allowed to be shown in Germany in 1944 due to Nazi censorship and was only released in 1945 by the Allies
- Stray Dog, 1949
- Invasion of the Body Snatchers, 1956
- La Paloma, Germany 1958
- Habanera, Spain 1958
- Freddy, die Gitarre und das Meer, 1959
- Freddy und der Millionär
- Adua e le compagne, 1960
- Blue Hawaii, 1961, Elvis Presley singing "No More". His recording was also featured on the soundtrack album and a re-recorded "live" version for the American version of Aloha from Hawaii which was not used in the broadcast. This 1973 version was originally released on the budget album Mahalo from Elvis but has since been included on various reissues of the live album.
- The Godfather Part II, 1974. The band are playing "La Paloma" in the opening scene of the New Year party in Havana.
- Bröderna Lejonhjärta, 1977. Karl's mom is heard singing the Swedish version of "La Paloma".
- The Tin Drum, 1979
- Das Boot, 1981 (performed in German by Rosita Serrano).
- Mortelle Randonnée, 1983. In the film, the Hans Albers version is heard.
- The House of the Spirits, 1993
- Sonnenallee, 1999
- A Moment to Remember, 2004
- "La Paloma" is the subject of the 2008 documentary La Paloma. Sehnsucht. Weltweit (German for La Paloma. Longing. Worldwide) by Sigrid Faltin.
- Soul Kitchen, 2009
- Manila Kingpin: The Asiong Salonga Story, 2011
- In the musical film, Down Argentine Way, Charlotte Greenwood sings an upbeat, fast song called "Sing To Your Senorita". The melody is loosely based on that of "La Paloma".

== Lyrics ==
Cuando salí de La Habana
¡Válgame Dios!
Nadie me ha visto salir
Si no fui yo.
Y una linda Guachinanga
Allá voy yo.
se vino detras de mí,
que sí, señor.

Refrain:
Si a tu ventana llega una paloma,
Trátala con cariño que es mi persona.
Cuéntale tus amores, bien de mi vida,
Corónala de flores que es cosa mía.
Ay, chinita que sí!
Ay, que dame tu amor!
Ay, que vente conmigo, chinita,
A donde vivo yo!

El día que nos casemos ¡Válgame Dios!
En la semana que hay ir Me hace reir
Desde la Iglesia juntitos, Que sí señor,
Nos iremos a dormir, Allá voy yo.
(Refrain)

Cuando el curita nos eche La bendición
En la Iglesia Catedral, Allá voy yo
Yo te daré la manita Con mucho amor
Y el cura dos hisopazos Que sí señor
(Refrain)

Cuando haya pasado tiempo ¡Válgame Dios!
De que estemos casaditos Pues sí señor,
Lo menos tendremos siete Y que furor!
O quince guachinanguitos Allá voy yo
(Refrain)
