= Marty Pasetta =

American television producer and director

- Born: Martin Allen Pasetta; June 16, 1932; San Jose, California, U.S.
- Died: May 21, 2015 (aged 82); La Quinta, California, U.S.
- Occupations: Television producer, director
- Years active: 1952–2015
- Children: 3

Martin Allen Pasetta (June 16, 1932 – May 21, 2015) was an American television producer and director, best known for his work on the telecasts for multiple awards shows, including the Oscars, the Grammys, and the AFI Life Achievement Awards. He also directed The Smothers Brothers Comedy Hour along with the game shows Wheel of Fortune and Love Connection. He also produced the game show Catchphrase, which, while short-lived in the US, went on to a long run in the UK, where their adaptation ran from 1986 until 2002 and was revived again in 2013; Pasetta also co-produced a pilot for an American revival in 2006 that didn't sell (as well as late 1980s revisions called Puzzle Roulette and The Puzzle Game, both of which were hosted by Jim Lange). He also produced two pilots in 1990; a revival of Name That Tune with Orion Television with Peter Allen as host, and a card game titled Suit Yourself with Jim Peck at the helm. 1992 saw him produce a short-lived primetime game show for CBS called The Hollywood Game, with Bob Goen (the pilot had been hosted by Allen, but he was unable to host the series due to illness).

Pasetta was the producer of the Elvis Presley concert special, Aloha from Hawaii via Satellite in January 1973. The show still holds the record for the most watched television special in history; viewing figures are between 1 and 1.5 billion live viewers worldwide. 1973 also saw Pasetta direct Magnavox Presents Frank Sinatra (also known as Ol' Blue Eyes Is Back), the television special that marked Frank Sinatra's comeback from retirement. Pasetta also directed the film Let Poland be Poland for the United States Information Agency in 1982.

He was the director of the telecasts of the 44th Academy Awards, 45th Academy Awards, 46th Academy Awards, 47th Academy Awards, 48th Academy Awards, 49th Academy Awards, 50th Academy Awards, 51st Academy Awards, 52nd Academy Awards, 53rd Academy Awards, 54th Academy Awards, 55th Academy Awards, 56th Academy Awards, 57th Academy Awards, 58th Academy Awards, 59th Academy Awards and 60th Academy Awards (1972–1988).

Pasetta died in a 2015 single-car accident. The vehicle driven by Keith Stewart collided with Pasetta shortly after Stewart had allowed his passengers to disembark.
