= Aloha from Hawaii via Satellite =

1973 Elvis Presley concert broadcast via satellite

- Directed by: Marty Pasetta
- Starring: Elvis Presley
- Music by: Elvis Presley
- Country of origin: United States
- Original language: English

Production
- Producer: Marty Pasetta
- Editor: Stephen McKeown
- Running time: 85 minutes
- Production company: Pasetta Productions
- Budget: $2.5 million

Original release
- Network: NBC
- Release: April 4, 1973

Aloha from Hawaii via Satellite is a concert starring American singer Elvis Presley that took place at the Honolulu International Center and was broadcast live via satellite to audiences in Asia and Oceania on January 14, 1973. The show was presented with a delay in Europe. In the United States, to avoid a programming conflict with Super Bowl VII and Elvis on Tour which was playing in cinemas at the time, NBC opted to air a ninety-minute television special of the concert on April 4.

Presley returned to performing tours throughout the United States in 1970. Richard Nixon's 1972 visit to China inspired Presley's manager, Colonel Tom Parker, to promote a live broadcast concert featuring Presley and he arranged a deal with RCA Records and the NBC network to produce one. The show benefited the Kui Lee Cancer Fund.

Marty Pasetta produced and directed the program. A filmed rehearsal concert took place on January 12. The show earned good ratings in the countries targeted by the live broadcast. The television special presented in the United States became NBC's highest-rated program of the year, and it received a favorable reception from critics. Its soundtrack album became Presley's last chart-topper on Billboard's album chart.

== Background ==
After a seven-year hiatus from live performances to focus on his acting career, Elvis Presley returned with his 1968 NBC television special Elvis. Following the critical success of the special, by 1969, Presley returned to releasing non-soundtrack albums with From Elvis in Memphis. His manager, Colonel Tom Parker, arranged for him to play a concert residency at the newly built International Hotel in Las Vegas, Nevada. For this engagement he assembled a band, later known as the TCB Band: James Burton (guitar), John Wilkinson (rhythm guitar), Jerry Scheff (bass guitar), Ronnie Tutt (drums), Glen Hardin (piano) and Charlie Hodge (rhythm guitar, background vocals). The Sweet Inspirations, the Imperials, the Stamps and Kathy Westmoreland provided backing vocals, and the show also featured the 30-piece Joe Guercio orchestra. Presley began to tour the United States again in 1970 after a thirteen-year hiatus.

Presley's early 1972 albums, Elvis Now and He Touched Me, charted at number 43 and 79 on the Billboard 200. That year, Presley embarked on a 15-city tour that was filmed for the Metro-Goldwyn-Mayer (MGM) documentary Elvis on Tour. The film earned a Golden Globe Award for best documentary. A planned soundtrack album was never released as the recording equipment failed during the fourth night of performances.

Presley appeared at Madison Square Garden in New York City in June 1972; the performance was released as a live album the same month and reached number 11 on Billboard's Hot 100. Demand for Presley was strong in Europe and Asia, where Presley was eager to perform, but Parker prevented this. This has been attributed to Parker's status as an illegal immigrant; Parker concealed his origins as a Dutch national, and feared deportation if he left the United States. A month after the Madison Square Garden show, Parker mentioned to the press that arrangements were being made for Presley to play a concert via satellite to live audiences worldwide. Parker declared that "it is the intention of Elvis to please all of his fans throughout the world". This was seen as something only Elvis Presley could do as no other singer had such popularity across the globe.

== Production ==
On September 4, the final day of Presley's 59-show engagement at the Las Vegas Hilton, Parker announced at a press conference that the live NBC television special, Aloha from Hawaii, would take place in January 1973 in Hawaii. Parker had the idea in February 1972, when he saw the live broadcast of Richard Nixon's visit to China. Parker approached NBC's president Tom Sarnoff with the proposition. They set a tentative release date for November 18, the end of Presley's tour. The date had to be moved at the request of television executive Jim Aubrey, who wanted to avoid the special overlapping with the theatrical release of Elvis On Tour, scheduled for the same month. The date for the concert was eventually set for January 14, 1973. The broadcast in the United States was postponed until April to avoid a conflict with Super Bowl VII that was to be played on the same day.

Sarnoff suggested Marty Pasetta produce the special. Pasetta had produced television specials for Perry Como, Bing Crosby, Glen Campbell, and Don Ho's five specials, filmed on location in Hawaii. He had also produced broadcasts of the Oscars, Emmys, and Grammys. Presley was interested in a producer who could capture the atmosphere of a live concert. Pasetta attended Presley's concert in Long Beach on November 15. He was unimpressed by Presley's performance, feeling his presence was "staged, quiet", and expressed his doubts to the network that he would be able to produce an hour-and-a-half special. They told Pasetta to discuss his concerns with Parker.

=== Funding ===
RCA Records Tours, founded by RCA Records at Parker's request to manage the promotion of Presley's tours, would receive US$1 million (equivalent to $7.25 million in 2025) from NBC for the special. RCA would receive US$100,000 (equivalent to US$725,300 in 2025), while Presley and Parker would receive US$900,000 (equivalent to $6.53 million in 2025) to be split between them. Presley's managerial contract, signed in 1967, stipulated that Parker would receive fifty percent of the total profit of his negotiated deals.

Eddie Sherman, a Honolulu Advertiser writer, contacted Parker with the idea of giving the proceeds of the concert admissions to a charity he had recently established. Sherman had worked with Parker to promote Presley's 1961 benefit concert for the construction of the USS Arizona Memorial. Since Parker could not charge a television audience for tickets, Sherman proposed taking donations for the Kui Lee Cancer Fund instead. Sherman started the fund to benefit cancer research at the University of Hawaii. Kui Lee, a singer-songwriter from Hawaii, died in 1966 of lymph gland cancer. Presley recorded Lee's "I'll Remember You" in mid-1966 and included the song in his live sets starting in 1972. Presley contributed with the first donation of US$1,000 (equivalent to US$7,300 in 2025); while the audience could determine the amount of their donations.

=== Stage design ===
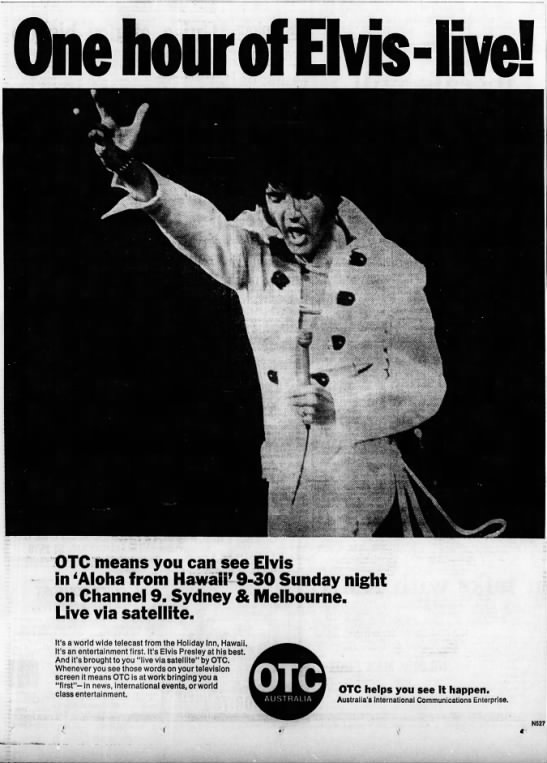
1973 advertisement for the live concert in Australia

Pasetta took sketches of his ideas for the stage to Parker. He envisioned the band placed on a riser behind Presley. The stage was to be built low to allow the audience proximity to him, with a runway to allow Presley to move towards them. Mirrors would frame the stage, while the background would feature flashing neon signs that read "Elvis" in the language of the countries where the concert was projected to be broadcast, and the accompanying album would be released. A figure holding a guitar was to be added to the background lights. Parker dismissed the idea, telling Pasetta that Presley would not approve of his plans.

Pasetta insisted on taking his ideas directly to Presley; Parker did not object. Pasetta told Presley he was not pleased with his performance in Long Beach and laid out his plans for the stage and the details of the Hawaii production. He finished by telling Presley he would need to lose weight for the special. Impressed by Pasetta's frankness, Presley became excited to work with him, and the meeting lasted four hours. Presley returned to his home, Graceland, in Memphis, Tennessee, and began to exercise to deal with Pasetta's weight concerns. He increased his practice of karate, consumed vitamins and protein drinks, and used weight-reduction pills. He lost 25 pounds (11 kg) in a month.

Pasetta returned to Los Angeles, where he began work on the stage that would be shipped to Hawaii; further set decorations would be added on location. The large stage covered the space used for 3,500 of the Honolulu International Center's 8,800 seats. RCA Records commissioned the Berlitz Corporation to translate the phrases and scriptures Presley would use.

The stage and equipment were shipped from Los Angeles to Hawaii in early January 1973. Pasetta and the crew traveled there to film the scenery to be added as inserts to the television special for its release in the United States. Presley arrived on January 10. After seeing the stage in the venue, Presley asked Pasetta to remove the scattered individual risers that were put in place for the TCB Band and backup singers. Pasetta agreed, and while work on the stage continued, Presley rehearsed at the Hilton Hawaiian Village. The show's opener was shot at the Hilton hotel's helipad, with a thousand Presley fans in attendance.

=== Costumes ===
Presley approached his costume designer, Bill Belew, with an idea for his concert suit. Belew had begun working for Presley in 1968, with the creation of the leather suit he wore for his NBC special Elvis, and created the one-piece jumpsuits he wore during his Las Vegas appearances. Belew's designs featured gabardine stretch fabric with Napoleonic collars, rhinestone decorations and bell-bottoms. For the upcoming special, Presley asked Belew to create a patriotic design. Presley felt the broadcast of the show via satellite was a product of American creative thinking. Since it was going to be viewed in foreign countries, he told Belew, "I just want the suit to say America". This was one of the few occasions when Presley made a special request of Belew, who usually relied on his own creativity.

Initially, Belew suggested a pattern based on the outline of the map. Then they considered the flag, but settled on the bald eagle, since Belew recalled seeing the image in a US embassy. The white jumpsuit featured a bald eagle made with patterns of gold, blue and red gems on the chest and back. Belew created a four-inch white leather belt featuring five ovals with the Great Seal of the United States. Initially, Belew made a calf-length cape. Presley planned to be covered by it at the start of his performance, and then reveal himself as the show started, but discarded it during rehearsals, as he felt it was too heavy at 12 pounds (5.4 kg). Belew created a hip-length cape. Producing the entire costume required most of Belew's staff because of the amount of embroidery and the attachment of several pieces of jewelry. It featured 6,500 individual stones.

During the rehearsals, Presley gave the costume's belt to Jack Lord's wife. Presley's associate, Joe Esposito called Belew. Alarmed, Belew told Esposito he had no more rubies, and that he would have to obtain them from Europe. However, he found them locally and worked overtime with his team to produce a new belt. Belew flew to Hawaii with the replacement belt and stayed for the shows.

== Rehearsal and concert ==
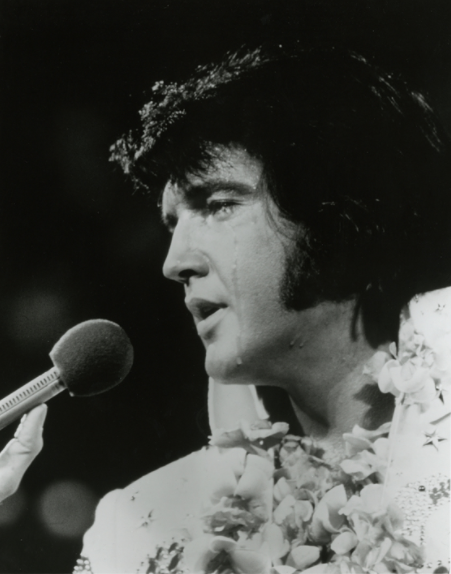
Elvis Presley in the Aloha from Hawaii 'rehearsal' show

The rehearsal show took place on Friday, January 12. Fans "stormed" the arena as the doors opened at 7:00 p.m., two hours before the start of the show. The audience was standing or sitting in the aisles. Initially, the number of attendees was set at 6,000. The rehearsal was filmed and had technical problems. Honolulu mayor Frank Fasi declared January 13 "Elvis Presley day", to commend him for his contributions to the Kui Lee Cancer Fund. The review in the Honolulu Star-Bulletin declared: "(Presley) put on an hour-long show last night that was perfect" and described the positive reaction of the female fans to Presley's presence.

The Aloha from Hawaii concert took place on January 14, at 12:30 a.m. local time to match the prime time of the broadcast locations of the concert: Hong Kong, Japan, South Korea, South Vietnam, the Philippines and Australia. Admission was more restricted for the Saturday show. Parker arranged entertainment for the fans turned away after the limit was reached, featuring high school bands, clowns, and robots. New technical problems arose as NBC's recording equipment, combined with RCA Records' equipment brought by engineer Wally Heider, overloaded the power sources. The problem was fixed, but two hours before the start of the show, the sound system picked up a hum caused by the stage lights. The sound engineers borrowed thick lead sheets from the United States Navy to isolate the equipment. Teenage fans were present in the first rows, while most of the audience was reported to be people in their forties. Among the audience were Mayor Fasi, Jack Lord, and Kui Lee's family.

Presley performed 22 songs. He made his usual entrance as the band played the 2001: A Space Odyssey theme "Also sprach Zarathustra". The set featured classics from Presley's repertoire, including "Blue Suede Shoes", "Hound Dog", and "Love Me". Presley also performed the ballads "You Gave Me a Mountain", "My Way", "I Can't Stop Loving You", "What Now My Love", Kui Lee's "I'll Remember You" and "An American Trilogy", among others. Presley threw his belt to the crowd at the end of "An American Trilogy". He closed the set with "Can't Help Falling in Love". At the start of the number, Presley was covered with the short cape by his assistant, Charlie Hodge. As he finished, he displayed the cape by opening it and raising it with his hands as he took a knee. He threw the cape into the first rows and then gave the audience the Shaka sign and received a golden crown from fans as he walked away.

After the audience left the building, Presley returned to the arena to record additional material for the United States version of the television special. "Blue Hawaii" was recorded with several takes, "KU-U-I-PO" and "No More" in three takes, "Hawaiian Wedding Song" is also followed with several takes, and "Early Morning Rain" closed the session. All songs except "No More" were used in the special. Pasetta then worked to edit out ten minutes for the planned European delayed broadcast on the Eurovision Network at 12:30 p.m. Central European Time.

== Reception ==
The proceeds of the show exceeded the planned US$25,000 (equivalent to US$181,300 in 2025), and US$75,000 (equivalent to US$543,900 in 2025) was raised for the Kui Lee Cancer Fund. The next day, Honolulu Advertiser columnist Wayne Harada called the show a "thrilling, compact hour-long on music and screams" in his review. He deemed Presley's performance of "I'll Remember You" as "easily the most sentimental" for the Hawaiian audience and remarked on the warm reception for "An American Trilogy".

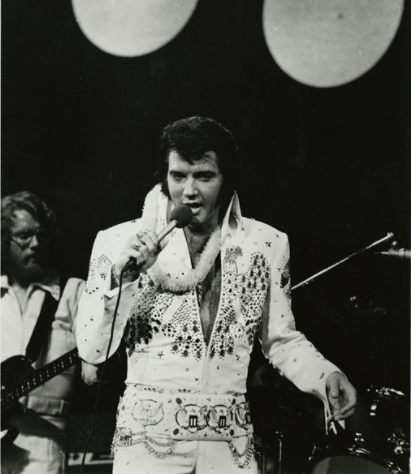
Presley (front) and bassist Jerry Scheff (left)

Initial reports estimated the show was seen by 1.5 billion people in 36 countries. Parker had presented the same figures at the press conference promoting the broadcast. The communications satellite Intelsat IV F-4 was used for the transmission of the live feed to the target area. In Australia, Channel Nine presented the show with the assistance of the Overseas Telecommunications Commission (OTC). The concert closed the "Elvis Presley Week" television event on NTV in Japan and garnered 37.8% of the total television viewers; viewership reached 70% in Hong Kong. In South Korea, it attracted an estimated 70–80% of TV viewers, while tentative data from the Philippines indicated 91.8%. As the event occurred during the Cold War, China and the Soviet Union were excluded from the broadcast. Contrary to Parker's claim, the concert would be presented with a delay of days or weeks to the 21 European countries where it was finally seen; countries that were a part of the Warsaw Treaty Organization were excluded. The figures for total viewers proposed by Presley's manager were questioned, as critics pointed that the sum of the total population of all the countries targeted by the broadcast was roughly 1.3 billion with the actual viewership ranging from 150-200 million.

NBC aired the ninety-minute television special on April 4. The Stokely-Van Camp Company and Toyota presented the show. It opened with an animation of the satellite "beaming" Presley to different parts of the world, with audio signals in Morse code saying "Elvis: Aloha from Hawaii". Pasetta added clips of Presley's arrival by helicopter to the Hilton hotel and the show outside the arena to the concert sequences. The additional recordings Presley made after the show were also integrated. Pasetta used split-screens to show Presley and the scenery images he had filmed of Hawaii. The track "No More" was not used. The show earned a Nielsen rating of 33.8 and a 57 share.

Billboard praised the special's camera work, declaring that Presley "dominated the tube with showmanship" and concluded that at 38, Presley "still knows how to sing rock". The Los Angeles Times review remarked on Presley's "polished skills" while calling his antics "an amusing parody" of his early career. It called the performances of "An American Trilogy" "stunning", and "I'll Remember You" as "poignant". In contrast, The Boston Globe's negative review rated the show with two stars out of five. The reviewer felt the set decorations were "trappings" and that Presley's performance was "buried in folderol". The piece drew a comparison with his appearances on the Ed Sullivan Show and declared "the electricity was gone" and that "he was mocking himself and his milieu".

The New York Daily News praised Pasetta's work on the production and Presley's performance that used "fewer tricks" but delivered "a skillfully paced concert". A negative review in the Chicago Sun-Times said the program consisted of "a 90-minute documentary of Presley's sweat glands at work, masquerading as an entertainment special". It criticized Presley's lack of "body movements" and his "feet-apart stance that was more appropriate to address a pinball machine". The Charlotte News review said that while Presley "pushed himself to the limit" for the performance, the ninety-minute presentation was "entirely too much". The piece criticized NBC's choice to broadcast a special by Ann-Margret immediately following Presley's show. The Cincinnati Enquirer reviewer felt "captivated" by Presley's "singing and stage talents", but lamented the "unnecessary segment" depicting Presley's arrival and reception by fans. Meanwhile, the newspaper's rock critic felt that the abundance of close-ups of Presley "knock out about half of the mystique".

== Soundtrack ==
RCA Records released the soundtrack album worldwide in February 1973 in quadraphonic sound. RCA employed two of its record pressing plants to manufacture the album. The LP's sleeve contained the phrase "we love Elvis" written in different languages. The double-LP reached number one on the Billboard 200. Aloha from Hawaii was Presley's second double album (not including compilations) as well as his first chart-topper since 1965, and the last during his lifetime. The album sold half-a-million copies in two weeks and was certified gold one week later. The album went on to be certified 5× platinum.

== Legacy ==
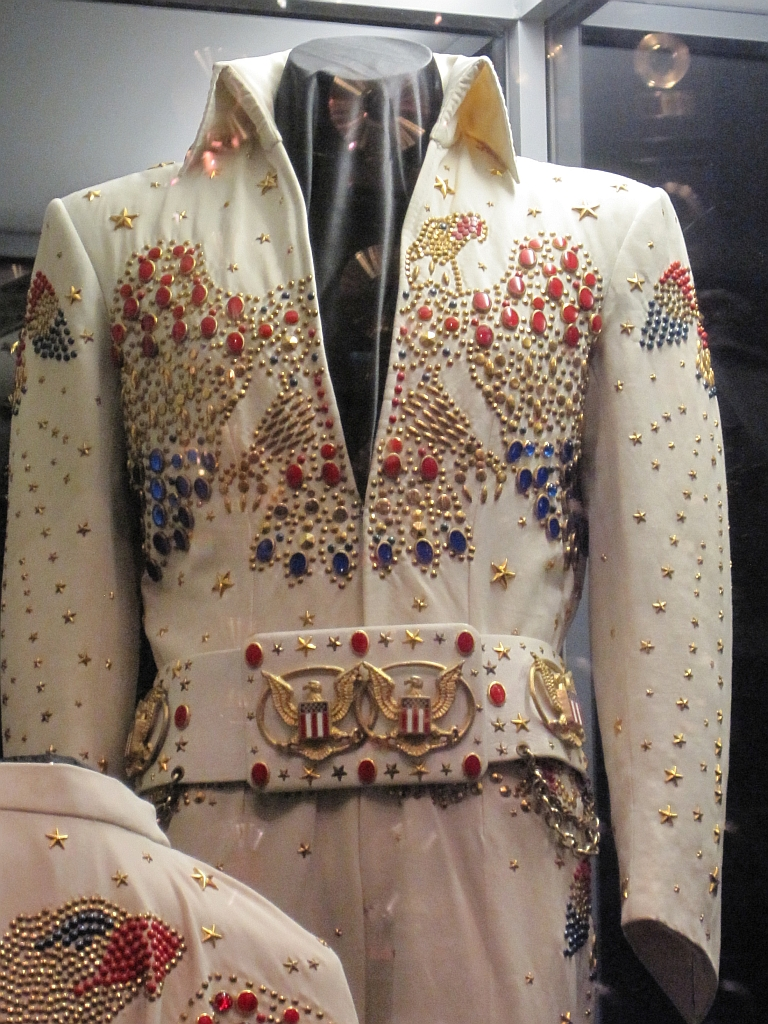
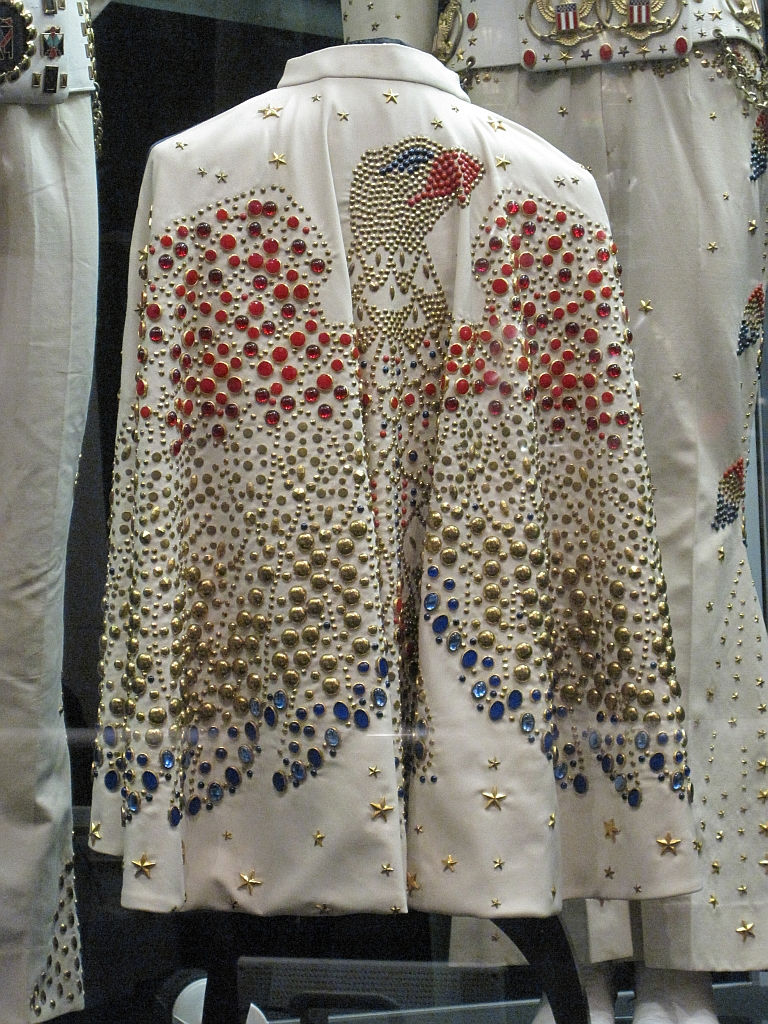
Jumpsuit worn by Presley during the concert

The 1967 Our World black-and-white television special was the first live international concert presented via satellite. Aloha from Hawaii was the first live satellite broadcast to feature a single performer. The production cost of the special was a total of US$2.5 million (equivalent to $18.13 million in 2025), setting a record at the time of its broadcast. The show was NBC's highest-rated program of the year.

Belew made two costumes for the show, each worn in one of the concerts. Both of Presley's costumes are kept by Elvis Presley Enterprises; one of them is on display at Graceland mansion. The short-cape worn by Presley during the special was caught by Honolulu Advertiser sportswriter Bruce Spinks. Spinks sold it to collector Andrew Kern. After Kern's death in 1995, his mother followed his wish to donate the cape to be displayed at Graceland. The second cape was sold at an auction in 1999 for US$105,250 (equivalent to US$203,400 in 2025). In 2014, the long cape was listed by RR Auction. The bids reached US$90,000 (equivalent to US$124,400 in 2025), short of the reserve price. The seller and buyer had to negotiate a final price.

In 2007, a life-size bronze statue of Presley commissioned by TV Land was unveiled at the site of the concert. It commemorated the thirtieth anniversary of Presley's death. In 2013, a five-day celebration for the fortieth anniversary of the concert took place in Hawaii. On January 14, a special screening of the concert was played at the same venue, now named the Neal Blaisdell Arena.

=== Home media ===
Aloha from Hawaii was first released on VHS in 1984. In june 2004, Aloha from Hawaii: (Deluxe Edition) was released on DVD. The two-disc package includes the concert, the rehearsal, and the extended US special. Additionally, the set contains the complete sequence of Presley's arrival and the entire post-concert session. The picture and the sound were digitally remastered from the original master tapes. Allmusic gave the release four stars out of five, and declared "the January 14 show remains genuinely exciting 31 years later", and praised the audio and video remastering. RCA first reissued the original double album on compact disc in 1992; In 1988, RCA had issued The Alternate Aloha, containing the previously unreleased dress rehearsal from February 12 1973, two days before the broadcast concert. In 1998, RCA again reissued the original album with five bonus tracks. A single-disc special edition version of the concert was released in 2006. In 2023, Legacy Recordings announced the release of a newly remastered box-set consisting of three CDs and a blu-ray, or two LPs. The label set the release date for August 11, 2023, while it also announced the screening of the concert at Graceland on August 16, 2023 and a Q&A event.

=== Charts and certifications ===
Chart (2004)	Peak position
Australian Top 40 Music DVDs	1
Austrian Top 10 Music DVDs	7
Belgium (Flanders) Top 10 Music DVDs	2
Belgium (Wallonia) Top 10 Music DVDs	1
Ireland Top 20 DVDs	17
Japanese DVDs Chart	117
Netherlands Top 30 Music DVDs	2
New Zealand Top 10 Music DVDs	6
Norwegian Top 10 DVDs	2
Spanish Top 20 Music DVDs	6
Swedish Top 20 DVDs	1

Chart (2006)	Peak position
Italian Top 20 Music DVDs	14

Region	Certification	Certified units/sales
Australia (ARIA)	2× Platinum	30,000^{^}
Austria (IFPI Austria)	Gold	5,000^{*}
Canada (Music Canada)	3× Platinum	30,000^{^}
France (SNEP)	Platinum	20,000^{*}
United States (RIAA) 1984 VHS release	Platinum	100,000^{^}
United States (RIAA) 2004 release	4× Platinum	400,000^{^}
United States (RIAA) 2006 release	2× Platinum	200,000^{^}
^{*} Sales figures based on certification alone.^{^} Shipments figures based on certification alone.
