= Brian Z. Tamanaha =

American legal scholar

- Born: Brian Z. Tamanaha
- Citizenship: American
- Occupations: Legal scholar, Professor
- Employer: Washington University School of Law
- Known for: legal pluralism, legal realism, rule of law, realistic theory of law
- Title: John S. Lehmann University Professor
- Awards: IVR Book Prize (2019), Dennis Leslie Mahoney Prize (2006), Herbert Jacob Book Prize (2002)

Academic background
- Education: University of Oregon (B.S., 1980), Boston University School of Law (J.D., 1983), Harvard Law School (S.J.D., 1992)
- Doctoral advisor: Roberto M. Unger

Brian Z. Tamanaha (born 1957) is an American legal scholar and the John S. Lehmann University Professor at Washington University School of Law. His scholarship spans jurisprudence, law and society, legal pluralism, the rule of law, legal realism, law and development, and legal education. He is particularly associated with the development of a pragmatic and socially grounded theory of law and with historical and sociological approaches to jurisprudence.

Tamanaha's books include A General Jurisprudence of Law and Society (2001), On the Rule of Law (2004), Law as a Means to an End (2006), Failing Law Schools (2012), A Realistic Theory of Law (2017), and Legal Pluralism Explained (2021). His work has received awards from the Law and Society Association, the International Association for Philosophy of Law and Social Philosophy, and other scholarly organizations. In 2013, a poll of law deans and professors conducted by The National Jurist ranked him first on its list of influential legal educators.

== Early life and education ==
Tamanaha received his Bachelor of Science from the University of Oregon in 1980. He earned his Juris Doctor magna cum laude from Boston University School of Law in 1983. After practicing law for several years, he obtained his Doctorate of Juridical Science (S.J.D.) from Harvard Law School in 1992, working under Roberto M. Unger.

== Legal career ==
=== Early legal practice ===
Following law school, Tamanaha clerked for the Honorable Walter E. Hoffman at the United States District Court for the Eastern District of Virginia from August 1983 to September 1984. He then served as an Assistant Federal Public Defender for the District of Hawaii from September 1984 to March 1986. In this position, he was primary defense counsel in United States v. Rewald, involving a Ponzi scheme that defendant Ron Rewald claimed was set up by the Central Intelligence Agency. Significant evidence was introduced during trial showing that the CIA worked with Rewald, although agency officials testified that they were unaware that Rewald's investment firm was a Ponzi scheme. During trial, Judge Harold Fong filed criminal contempt charges against Tamanaha on the grounds that his cross examination of CIA witnesses revealed unapproved classified information, although Fong denied Tamanaha's request to be released from the case, and he continued serving as Rewald's defense counsel. Following the completion of Rewald's trial, Federal District Judge Marilyn Hall Patel dismissed the contempt charges against Tamanaha.

Tamanaha was admitted to the Massachusetts Bar in 1984, the Hawaii Bar in 1986, and the bar of the Federated States of Micronesia in 1987.

=== Work in Micronesia ===
From November 1986 to August 1988, Tamanaha served as Assistant Attorney General for Yap State in the Federated States of Micronesia, which had recently gained independence from the former Trust Territories of the Pacific Islands. This experience proved formative for his later academic work on law and development and legal pluralism. He observed firsthand how American law operated in a radically different cultural context, where traditional customary systems coexisted with the formal state legal system.

In 1990, he returned to Micronesia to serve as Legal Counsel for the Micronesian Constitutional Convention. In addition to advising on several constitutional provisions, Tamanaha successfully represented the Convention before the Supreme Court of Micronesia against an effort to limit the scope of the Convention.

His work in Micronesia provided the empirical foundation for his doctoral thesis on transplanted law and his later theoretical work on legal pluralism.

== Academic career ==
After teaching American Law to masters students in the Harvard Law School graduate program, Tamanaha began his academic career as Universitair Docent (Assistant Professor) at the University of Amsterdam from January 1991 to June 1995. He also served as Research Associate and Lecturer at the Van Vollenhoven Institute for Law and Administration in Non-Western Countries at Leiden University from March 1993 to June 1995.

In 1995, he joined St. John's University School of Law, where he served as Assistant Professor (1995-1997), and Associate Professor (1997-1999). While still an untenured professor, he served as Interim Dean from January 1998 to June 1999. He was appointed Professor in 1999, and Benjamin N. Cardozo Professor in 2003. Drawing on his experiences as Interim Dean and observations about rising debt and limited job prospects for recent graduates, Tamanaha wrote Failing Law Schools (Chicago 2012), a critical investigation of legal education. Although the book prompted a backlash from some legal educators, Tamanaha was voted "1# Most Influential Legal Educator" (2013) in a poll of 300 legal academics by National Jurist magazine.

In 2010, Tamanaha joined Washington University School of Law as Professor of Law. He was appointed William Gardiner Hammond Professor of Law in September 2011 and became the John S. Lehmann University Professor in July 2017.

=== Visiting positions held ===
- Distinguished Visiting Professor of Legal Theory, University of Amsterdam (Summers 2014-)
- Fernand Braudel Senior Fellowship, European University Institute, Florence (April–June 2018)
- Visiting Professor, Kobe University, Japan (December 2019-January 2020)
- Visiting Professor, Queen Mary University of London (Summer Fellowship, 2015-2017)
- Visiting Professor of Law, Columbia Law School (Spring 2009)
- Member, Institute for Advanced Study, Princeton (September 2007-August 2008)

== Legal theory ==
=== Socio-legal theory and jurisprudence ===
Tamanaha's early scholarship sought to bridge jurisprudence and empirical studies of law. In Realistic Socio-Legal Theory: Pragmatism and a Social Theory of Law (1997), he developed a pragmatic approach to socio-legal theory that rejected attempts to construct a universal scientific concept of law detached from social practices.

He expanded this approach in A General Jurisprudence of Law and Society (2001). The book proposed a general jurisprudence attentive to the multiple ways law is understood and used in different social settings. His work emphasizes that legal phenomena must be examined in relation to historical and social contexts rather than solely through abstract conceptual analysis. The book received the 2006 Dennis Leslie Mahoney Prize in Legal Theory and the 2002 Herbert Jacob Book Prize in Law and Society.

A Realistic Theory of Law (2017) further developed this approach. Tamanaha presented law as a historically evolving complex of social institutions and argued for a theory grounded in observable social practices, portraying modern law as a constitutive background legal fabric for social, cultural, economic, political, and technological actions. The book received the 2019 IVR Book Prize for the best book in legal philosophy published between 2016 and 2018 and an honorable mention in the 2018 PROSE Awards.

=== Rule of Law ===
Tamanaha’s book On the Rule of Law: History, Politics, Theory (2004) is a widely cited theoretical overview of the rule of law that has been translated into ten languages. In this book and a dozen articles on the topic, he conveys, among other aspects, the historical origins, institutional requirements, and strengths and limitations of the rule of law, and he examines the operation of the rule of law in a number of contexts, including international law, legal pluralism, and the Trump Administration.

=== Legal pluralism ===
Tamanaha has developed an influential non-essentialist approach to legal pluralism, challenging dominant conceptions in legal anthropology, sociology, and jurisprudence. His work argues that legal pluralism should not be understood as multiple manifestations of a single phenomenon called "law," but rather as the coexistence of different kinds and manifestations of law in the same social field. This conventionalist approach avoids the definitional problems that plague essentialist theories of legal pluralism, and allows scholars to account for the operation of customary law, religious law, international law, and state law in given contexts.

In his analysis "A Vision of Social-Legal Change: Rescuing Ehrlich from 'Living Law'" (2011), Tamanaha critiques the conceptual problems inherent in Eugen Ehrlich's concept of "living law," arguing that attempts to locate law in social order cannot distinguish it from other functional equivalents such as customs, morality, and social relations. He proposes that Ehrlich's more enduring contribution lies in his dynamic vision of law as continuously evolving within society rather than in the problematic concept of living law itself.

=== Legal Realism ===
In Beyond the Formalist-Realist Divide (2010), Tamanaha set forth a revisionist account of legal realism that, among other things, challenges the standard narrative of the clash between the formalists and realists. Tamanaha argued that the "formalist age" was largely a fiction created by critics, and that significant aspects of legal realism were already articulated by historical jurisprudence and sociological jurisprudence. Legal historian Stuart Banner commented, "As David Rabban and Brian Tamanaha have shown, even the most supposedly formalist judges and scholars of the era do not look particularly formalist when their work is examined closely." Tamanaha also argued that political science studies produce a distorted view of judging and fail to capture important ways in which judges follow the law when rendering their decisions.

=== Realistic theory of law ===
Tamanaha has criticized contemporary analytical jurisprudence for its heavy reliance on intuitions and conceptual analysis to the exclusion of historical and sociological insights about law. His critique of universalistic claims in legal philosophy reveals multiple conceptual and empirical problems that arise when theorists attempt to identify essential truths about law that apply across all times and places. Drawing on philosophical pragmatism, Tamanaha has articulated a holistic vision of law within society evolving over time in connection with surrounding social, cultural, economic, technological, and political changes. His work brings renewed attention to historical jurisprudence and sociological jurisprudence, which have been largely ignored by contemporary legal philosophers. Using this perspective, Tamanaha focuses on a broad range of legal phenomena, including legal pluralism, law and development, natural law, and the rule of law.

=== Law and development ===
Tamanaha's work on law and development emerged partly from his legal experience in Micronesia. In “The Lessons of Law and Development Studies” (1995), he examined earlier efforts to export Western legal institutions to developing societies and questioned assumptions that formal legal reform would automatically produce social and economic change.

His later scholarship, particularly “The Primacy of Society and Failures of Law and Development” (2011), has emphasized the importance of local social conditions and legal pluralism in development policy. He also co-edited Legal Pluralism and Development: Scholars and Practitioners in Dialogue (2012) with Caroline Sage and Michael Woolcock.

=== Legal education ===
Tamanaha became prominent in debates over American legal education following the publication of Failing Law Schools in 2012. The book criticized rising tuition, increasing student debt, poor employment outcomes concealed by misleading reporting by law schools, and institutional incentives within American law schools. It argued that the cost structure of legal education had become increasingly disconnected from the economic circumstances facing many graduates.

The book contributed to national discussion about law-school transparency, tuition, enrollment, and the structure of legal education. In 2013, The National Jurist ranked Tamanaha first in a poll of influential people in legal education, attributing the recognition to the impact of Failing Law Schools.

== Awards ==
Tamanaha received the Herbert Jacob Book Prize from the Law and Society Association in 2002 for A General Jurisprudence of Law and Society. The same book later received the inaugural Dennis Leslie Mahoney Prize in Legal Theory from the Julius Stone Institute in 2006.

Realistic Socio-Legal Theory received a Special Recognition Award from the Law and Society Association in 1998. Law as a Means to an End received an honorable mention from the Association of American Publishers in its professional and scholarly publishing awards.

In 2019, A Realistic Theory of Law received the IVR Book Prize from the International Association for Philosophy of Law and Social Philosophy and had previously received an honorable mention in the 2018 PROSE Awards for Law and Legal Studies.

Tamanaha was selected as Professor of the Year by students at St. John's University School of Law in 2001 and received the David M. Becker Professor of the Year award at Washington University School of Law in 2013.

== Endowed lectures ==
Tamanaha has delivered the Dewey Lecture in the Philosophy of Law, Kobe Memorial Lecture, Julius Stone Address, Montesquieu Lecture, Cotterrell Lecture in Sociological Jurisprudence, George Wythe Lecture, Seegers Lecture, Baker & Hostetler Lecture, and Clason Lecture.

=== Teaching ===
- Selected as Professor of the Year at St. John's University School of Law (2001)
- Selected by students as the David M. Becker Professor of the Year at Washington University School of Law (2013)
- Voted the most influential legal educator in the United States by National Jurist magazine (a poll of over 300 law deans and professors, 2013)

== Selected publications ==
=== Books ===
- Truth About Natural Law: History, Theory, Consequences (Oxford University Press, 2026)
- Sociological Approaches to Theories of Law (Cambridge University Press, 2022)
- Legal Pluralism Explained: History, Theory, Consequences (Oxford University Press, 2021)
- A Realistic Theory of Law (Cambridge University Press, 2017)
- Failing Law Schools (University of Chicago Press, 2012)
- Beyond the Formalist-Realist Divide: The Role of Politics in Judging (Princeton University Press, 2010)
- Law as a Means to an End: Threat to the Rule of Law (Cambridge University Press, 2006)
- Perils of Pervasive Legal Instrumentalism (Wolf Legal Publishers, 2006)
- On the Rule of Law: History, Politics, Theory (Cambridge University Press, 2004)
- A General Jurisprudence of Law and Society (Oxford University Press, 2001)
- Realistic Socio-Legal Theory: Pragmatism and a Social Theory of Law (Oxford University Press, 1997)
- Understanding Law in Micronesia: An Interpretive Approach to Transplanted Law (E.J. Brill, 1993)

=== Articles ===
- Tamanaha, B. Z. (1993). The folly of the social scientific concept of legal pluralism. Journal of Law and Society, 20, 192–217.
- Tamanaha, B. Z. (1995). The lessons of law-and-development studies. American Journal of International Law, 89, 470–486.
- Tamanaha, B. Z. (1996). The internal-external distinction and the notion of a practice in legal theory and sociolegal studies. Law & Society Review, 30, 163–204.
- Tamanaha, B. Z. (2001). Socio-legal positivism and a general jurisprudence. Oxford Journal of Legal Studies, 21, 1–32.
- Tamanaha, B. Z. (2008). Understanding legal pluralism: Past to present, local to global. Sydney Law Review, 30, 375–411.
- Tamanaha, B. Z. (2009). Understanding legal realism. Texas Law Review, 87, 731–785.
- Tamanaha, B. Z. (2011). The primacy of society and the failures of law and development. Cornell International Law Journal, 44, 209–247.
- Tamanaha, B. Z. (2015). The third pillar of jurisprudence: Social legal theory. William & Mary Law Review, 56, 2235–2277.
- Tamanaha, B. Z. (2021). Pragmatic reconstruction in jurisprudence: Features of a realistic legal theory. Canadian Journal of Law & Jurisprudence, 34, 171–197.
- Tamanaha, B. Z. (2021). Legal pluralism across the Global South: Colonial origins and contemporary consequences. Journal of Legal Pluralism and Unofficial Law, 53, 168–205.

== See also ==
- Legal pluralism
- Legal realism
- Sociology of law
- Law and development
- Rule of law
