= Salvation Army Waiʻoli Tea Room =

Former restaurant in Honolulu, Hawaii

- U.S. National Register of Historic Places
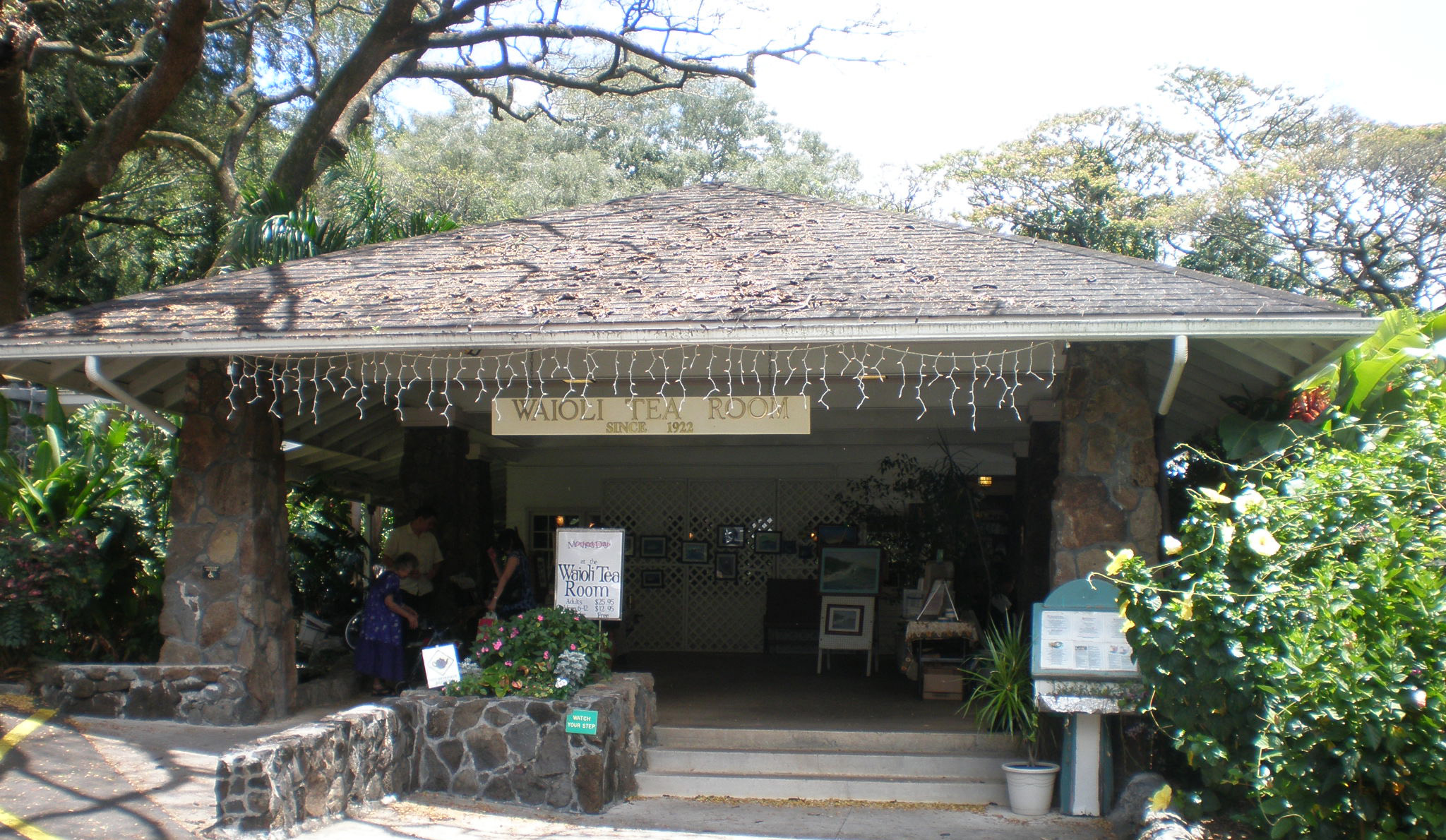
- Waiʻoli Tea Room

- Location within Hawaii
- Location: 2950 Mānoa Road, Honolulu, Hawaii
- Coordinates: 21°19′09″N 157°48′54″W
- Built: 1922
- NRHP reference No.: 98001288
- Added to NRHP: October 30, 1998

The Salvation Army Waiʻoli Tea Room was a Honolulu restaurant that operated from 1922 to 2014. After being closed for several years, it reopened in November 2018 as Waiʻoli Kitchen and Bake Shop. The restaurant is in a historic building at 2950 Mānoa Road, at the intersection of Oʻahu Avenue and Mānoa Road on the island of Oahu. Adjacent to the restaurant is a replica of the grass house that Robert Louis Stevenson occupied in 1889 when he visited Princess Kaʻiulani and her father Archibald Scott Cleghorn at their ʻĀinahau estate in Waikiki.

== History ==
Located in Mānoa Valley, the Waiʻoli Tea Room was formally dedicated in 1922, as part of the Salvation Army Girls' Home program to teach young women marketable job skills. The Salvation Army facility was one of several institutions in Hawaii in that era that provided care for those in need. Other such facilities included the Kaiulani Home for Girls, the Castle Home, and the Catholic Orphanage.

The concept for Wai'oli Tea Room was based on the high tea traditions of British Columbia emigrants living in Hawaii at the time it was built in 1922. Waiʻoli used "high tea" and "afternoon tea" to mean the same thing. Over the years, it has been a popular venue for local residents as well as tourists.

== The historic building ==
The original one-story lava rock and shingle bungalow features an open lānai (veranda), a large room with an open-beam ceiling, fireplace, and tall double-hung windows, and another smaller room with a fireplace. It was designed by Emory & Webb, a successful Honolulu architectural firm of the era, to harmonize with nearby residences. Walter Leavitte Emory was born November 10, 1868, in Fitchburg, Massachusetts. He relocated to the Territory of Hawaii in 1898. Marshall Hickman Webb was born May 7, 1869, in Philadelphia, Pennsylvania. Sometime between 1908 and 1910, the two formed the architectural partnership of Emory & Webb. They designed numerous buildings and residences in Honolulu, perhaps the most notable being the 1922 Hawaii Theatre. Emory died in 1929.

The building was added to the National Register of Historic Places listings on Oahu on October 30, 1998. When it was originally built in 1922, there was one L-shaped wing. A 1926 addition created a U-shaped building; the resulting interior open lānai was subsequently roofed over and enclosed. The current entrance dates from 1960.

== Robert Louis Stevenson's grass house ==
Located on the Waiʻoli grounds adjacent to the restaurant is what has become known as the Robert Louis Stevenson Memorial Grass House. It is a replica of the original that was once there. The structure was built as a guest house at their ʻĀinahau estate by the father of Princess Ka'iulani, businessman Archibald Scott Cleghorn. In 1889, Stevenson and his family stayed in the grass house. Ka'iulani and the author spent much time together on the estate. Ka'iulani died in 1899. When Cleghorn died in 1910, he willed the estate to the Territory of Hawaii, specifying it be maintained as a park in Ka'iulani's memory. The Princess Ka'iulani Hotel now stands where the ʻĀinahau estate once was. When the hut was auctioned off in 1926, it was moved to the current location. Although the Salvation Army initially did a complete restoration of the structure, it had to be entirely rebuilt in 1983. In 2003, it was destroyed by high winds. The grass house was finally rebuilt and reopened in 2012.
