= Rewald =

Rewald is a surname. Notable people with the surname include:

- Anthony B. Rewald (1906–1993), American electrical engineer and politician
- John Rewald (1912–1994), American academic, author and art historian
- Ron Rewald (1942–2017), Hawaii investment advisor, football player and self-described CIA agent
