= Sheraton Waikiki Hotel =

High-rise hotel in Honolulu, Hawaii

Sheraton Waikiki Beach Resort
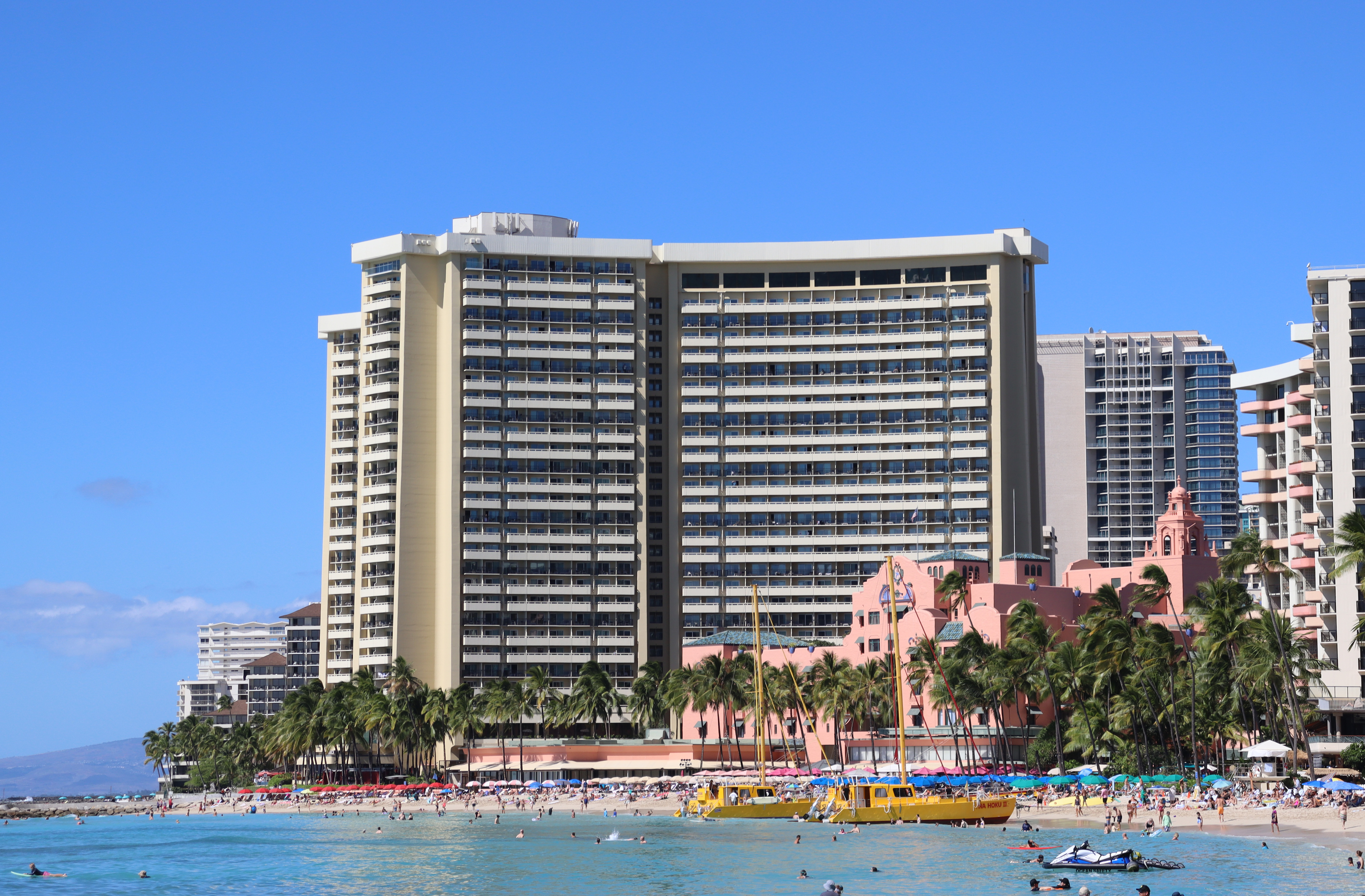
- The hotel in January 2025

General information
- Location: Waikiki, Honolulu, Hawaii
- Coordinates: 21°16′41.7″N 157°49′47.7″W
- Opening: June 4, 1971
- Owner: Kyo-Ya Management Company
- Operator: Marriott International

Height
- Roof: 96 m (315 ft)

Technical details
- Floor count: 31

Other information
- Number of rooms: 1,636
- Number of suites: 131
- Number of restaurants: 3

Website
- https://www.marriott.com/en-us/hotels/hnlws-sheraton-waikiki-beach-resort/

The Sheraton Waikiki Beach Resort is a resort hotel in Honolulu, Hawaii on Waikiki. It was built in 1971 and is currently owned by Kyo-Ya Management Company, Ltd. and operated by Marriott International.

== History ==
The Sheraton Waikiki Hotel opened on June 4, 1971. In 1974, Japanese brothers Kenji Osano and Masakuni Osano bought the hotel, along with the Sheraton Maui and the Royal Hawaiian Hotel. They already owned three other Sheraton properties in Hawaii: the Princess Kaiulani Hotel, the Moana Hotel and the Surfrider Hotel. The Osano brothers formed Kyo-Ya Company Limited, a subsidiary of Kokusai Kogyo Company Limited as the corporate entity charged with overseeing the hotel properties. The purchases put the Osano brothers on the Forbes List of World's Richest People in 1999. After the death of the Osano brothers, Takamasa Osano inherited the billions of dollars owned in properties. The Sheraton Waikiki Hotel is used as the Osano corporate office. In 2004 Takamasa Osano sold 65% of Kokusai Kogyo to Cerberus Partners LP to cover $4 billion in defaulted loans. He still controls 35% of the company.

In September 2023, the hotel completed a $200 million renovation and was renamed the Sheraton Waikiki Beach Resort.

On November 12, 2024, workers at the Sheraton Waikiki Hotel ratified a new labor contract.
