= Gertraud Wagner-Schöppl =

Austrian veterinarian and politician

Gertraud Antonia Prinzessin zu Schaumburg-Lippe (born Gertraud Antonia Schöppl on 21 September 1956 in Salzburg) is a former Austrian veterinarian and politician.

== Biography ==
She was member of the Salzburg parliament from 1999 to 2004.

Her parents were businessman Adolf Schöppl and wife metal-industrialist Dr. iur. Edith Schöppl, of Viennese Jewish heritage.

She opened her private veterinary clinic and served as head of the Salzburg district veterinary department. The residents of the federal district of Salzburg elected her to the legislative counsel where she served to the benefit of people as well as animal protection. She received the Austrian Civil Decoration of the Golden Order of Salzburg.

In 2008 she married Waldemar Prinz zu Schaumburg-Lippe. In 2009 Waldemar adopted her son Mario-Max (nl) (born December 23, 1977) from a previous marriage to Helmut Wagner. Her husband Waldemar, her son and herself were very close to the late Helga-Lee Schaumburg-Lippe.
