= Yong-Shik Lee =

Yong-Shik Lee (also known as Steve Lee) is a lawyer, economist, and international relations scholar with internationally-recognized authority in law and development and international trade law. He is currently Director and Professorial Fellow of the Law and Development Institute and a professor at West Virginia University College of Law. He has also taught and conducted academic research at prominent universities throughout the United States, Europe, and Asia, including Cornell University, New York University, Emory University, Tulane University, the University of Manchester, and the University of Sydney. He graduated with a degree in economics and academic distinction from the University of California at Berkeley and received law degrees from the University of Cambridge (B.A., M.A., Ph.D). He is licensed to practice law in multiple jurisdictions, including the United States (California and North Carolina) and the United Kingdom.

Professor Lee has published 130 academic articles, books, chapters, and shorter notes with leading publishers in North America, Europe, and Asia, in the areas of international economic law, law and development, development / institutional economics, comparative law, and international commercial arbitration. He has developed the “General Theory of Law and Development,” which examines the causal mechanisms by which law impacts development, and the “New General Theory of Development Economics,” which analyzes the constituent elements of economic development. He is currently an associate editor of the Journal of World Trade and the founding editor-in-chief of the Law and Development Review. His principal contribution also includes "Analytical Law and Development Model (ADM)."

Professor Lee participated in a number of bilateral and multilateral negotiations on international trade and investment at international forums such as the United Nations Commission on International Trade Law. He has appeared before WTO dispute settlement panels and the WTO Appellate Body as a government counsel, and advised national governments, international law firms, and consulting companies on international trade and development projects and major international commercial arbitration cases. He has frequently spoken on issues of international economic law, law and development, and the WTO through over eighty speech engagements at prominent forums such as Harvard Law School, Harvard University Kennedy School of Government, Yale Law School, Johns Hopkins University School of Advanced International Studies, New York University School of Law, and the World Bank.

== Selected publications ==
Lee, Y. S. (2026). Reclaiming Development in the World Trading System (Cambridge University Press, 3d ed.).
Lee, Y. S. (2025). Safeguard Measures in World Trade (Edward Elgar, 4th ed., 2025).
Lee, Y. S. (2023). Sustainable Peace in Northeast Asia (Anthem Press, 2023).
Lee, Y. S. (2022). Law and Development: Theory and Practice (Routledge, 2d ed., 2022).
Lee, Y. S. (2020). "New General Theory of Economic Development: Innovative Growth and Distribution." Review of Development Economics, 24(2), 402-423.
Lee, Y. S. (2017). "General theory of law and development." Cornell International Law Journal, 50, 415-471.
Lee, Y. S. (2015). "Call for a new analytical model for law and development." Law and Development Review, 8(1), 1-67.
