= Law and development =

Interdisciplinary study of law and economic and social development

Law and development is an interdisciplinary study of law and economic and social development. It examines the relation between law and development and analyzes how to use law as an instrument to promote economic and social development.

== Classical Philosophers ==
The idea that law is relevant to economic and social development goes back 250 years. Adam Smith stated in his Lectures on Jurisprudence that “the imperfection of the law and the uncertainty in its application” was a factor that retarded commerce. Max Weber, a philosopher of the late nineteenth and the early twentieth century, explained the importance of “rational” law in economy and society. Friedrich Hayek, a prominent London School of Economics and University of Chicago economist of the twentieth century, studied relevant legal concepts to support liberty as the prerequisite for development.

== The Law and Development Movements ==
Law and development studies originated largely as by-products of "development assistance" activities by the United States government, international development institutions like the World Bank, and private foundations working with governments and legal institutions in developing countries. In the 1960s, some American organizations such as the U.S. Agency for International Development and the Ford Foundation sponsored the law reform in developing countries. Economists led the pack and economic development studies were for a time one of the most glamorous areas of applied economics. Legal scholars from leading American law schools wrote many articles discussing the contribution of law reform to economic development. This was called the law and development movement. Law and development studies were never well integrated or monolithic. But at a very general level most of the scholars and some of the developers shared, in the early years, some rather fundamental notions about the nature of law, and the character of development. These assumptions told the scholars how to orient their research, and gave them confidence that their scholarly and assistance efforts were morally worthy.

However, after only one decade, both key involved scholars and former Ford Foundation officials declared this movement failed. The presumably failed law and development movement was revived in the 1980s, with the proliferation of law reform projects based on neoliberal ideals. These projects supported liberal reforms such as privatization and trade liberalization, with the emphasis on the rule of law. Substantial investments were made on these projects by international development agencies such as the World Bank, USAID, and other public agencies and private foundations, but these law reform projects were criticized for being ineffective or causing adverse impacts on development in many places in the world. The three main critiques were:

1. the critique of universality (ethnocentrism of liberal legalist paradigm);

2. the critique of formal law’s potency (disregard of the significance of informal alternatives); and

3. the inequality of legal reform (empowering elites, containing protest).

== The New Law and Development ==
The cause of the failure in the previous law and development movements is that the law reform projects were developed and implemented without sufficient understanding of the mechanism by which LFIs impact economic and social development, which is affected by various socio-economic factors on the ground. The Law and Development Institute was set up in 2009 to promote studies in law and development and develop a comprehensive analytical model for law and development, and the Law and Development Review was launched in 2008 as the only peer-reviewed academic journal devoted to law and development.

Scott Newton has argued that, "It [law and development] does not appear to possess a particular normative armature or notable thematic consistency or much of a unifying logic or set of organizing principles. The most one can say is that the disciplinary range of L&D is constituted by the aggregate of studies pursued by its self-identifying adherents." Yong-Shik Lee noted this "indeterminacy, lack of disciplinary clarity, and absence of an underpinning theory that systematically explains the interrelations between law and development have retarded its development as a coherent academic field." In an attempt to remedy this Lee published his General Theory of Law and Development, the first major theory in law and development that defines the disciplinary parameters of law and development and explains the mechanisms by which law impacts development ("the regulatory impact mechanisms"). The General Theory has been adopted to explain the process of development in several countries, such as South Korea, South Africa, the United States, and Botswana, from legal and institutional perspectives.

Recently, efforts have also been made to expand the application of law and development approaches to economic problems in developed countries such as the United States. Law and development has traditionally been associated with less developed countries in the Third World (“developing countries”), not the economically advanced countries (“developed countries”). However, the changing economic conditions in recent decades, such as the widening income gaps among individual citizens and regions within developed countries, stagnant economic growth deepening economic polarization, and an institutional incapacity to deal with these issues, render the law and development approaches relevant to the assessment of the economic problems in developed countries

== New Comparative Economics in the 2000s ==
A related field is new comparative economics. The theme of this research is that institutions exert a profound influence on economic development. To understand capitalist institutions, one needs to understand the basic tradeoff between the costs of disorder and those of dictatorship. This logic is applied to study the structure of efficient institutions, the consequences of colonial transplantation, and the politics of institutional choice.

The interest in institutions revived with the collapse of socialism and the transition of the economies in Eastern Europe, the former Soviet Union, and China to capitalism. This experience has been diverse, ranging from rapid growth in China and Poland, to a sharp decline followed by recovery in Russia, to stagnation with limited reform in Belarus and Uzbekistan. Early debates on transition focused on the speed of reforms as a crucial determinant of performance. Although it is now clear that the absence of reform, as in the Ukraine and Cuba, is associated with both economic and political stagnation, the emphasis on speed turned out to be excessive.

One recognizable product in this sub-field is the ease of doing business index, an index created jointly by Simeon Djankov, Michael Klein and Caralee McLiesh, three leading economists at the World Bank. The origins of the idea are described in a 2016 Journal of Economic Perspectives article. The academic research for the report was done jointly with Harvard University professors Edward Glaeser, Oliver Hart and Andrei Shleifer.

The latest research in this sub-field focuses on the difference between laws on the books and the practice of law.

== See also ==
- Legal origins theory – Claims that civil law and common law shape lawmaking
- International development – Concept concerning the level of development on an international scale
- International economic law – Field of international law
- Ease of doing business index – Economic indicator
