= ʻĀinahau =

Royal residence in Hawaii

Coordinates: 21.2775193°N 157.8280733°W

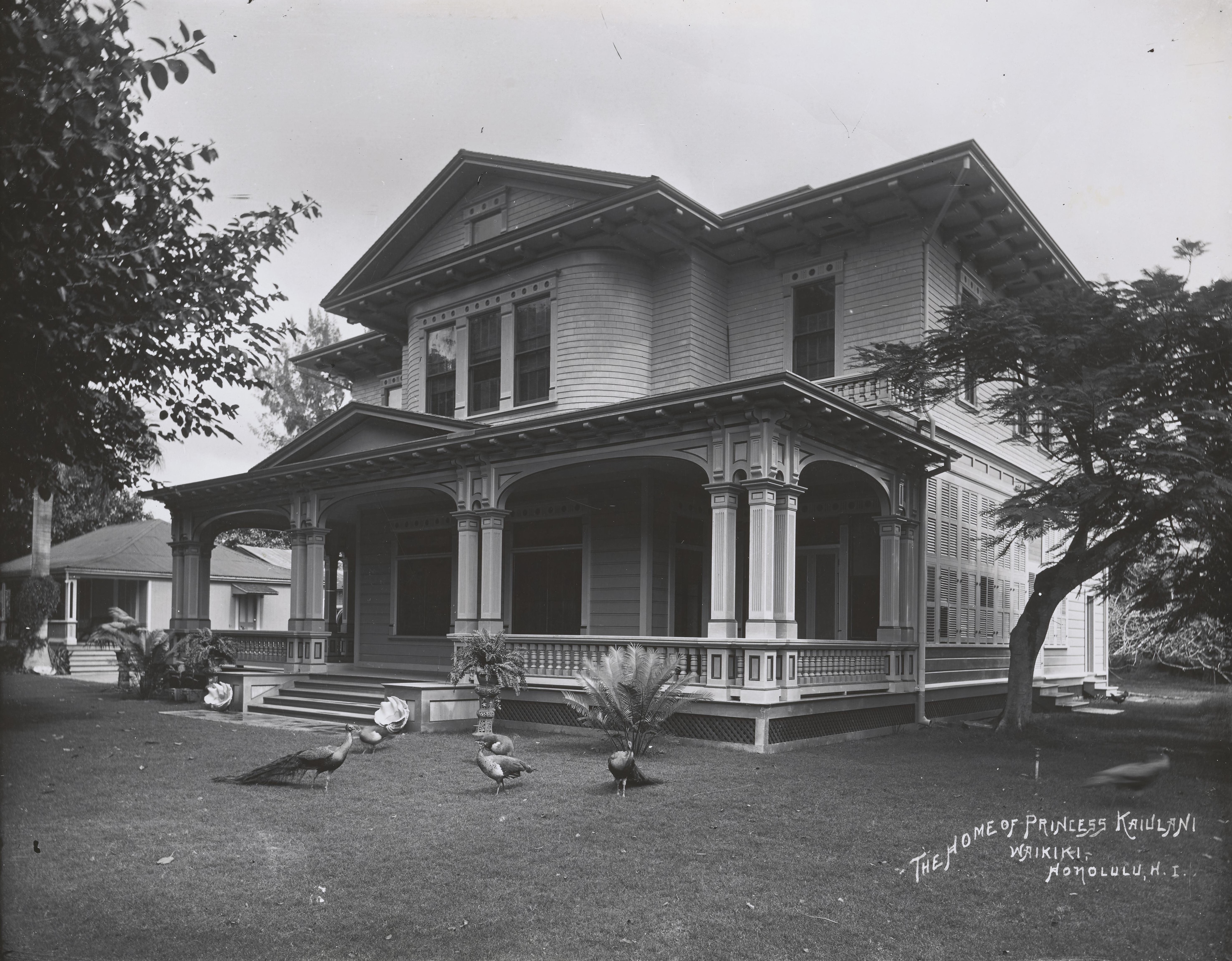
Princess Kaʻiulani's residence at ʻĀinahau with peacocks on the lawn. Kaʻiulani grew up in the bungalow on the left while the larger main house was built in 1897 to celebrate Kaʻiulani's return from Europe.

ʻĀinahau was the royal estate of Princess Victoria Kaʻiulani, heir to the throne of the Kingdom of Hawaiʻi. The estate included a 19th-century bungalow and a larger main house was built in 1897 to celebrate Kaʻiulani's return from Europe. ʻĀinahau was destroyed in 1921, and the site later became the Sheraton Princess Kaiulani Hotel.

== History ==
ʻĀinahau was located at the ʻili (traditional subdivision) of ʻAuʻaukai, the ahupuaʻa of Waikīkī, on the island of Oʻahu. At the time, the site was four miles outside of the city of Honolulu. In 1872, Scottish businessman Archibald Scott Cleghorn purchased 6 acres at ʻAuʻaukai from two Hawaiians named Maʻaua and Koihala. Cleghorn's wife became Princess Likelike upon her brother's ascension as King Kalākaua in 1874.

After the 1875 birth of their daughter Kaʻiulani, her godmother Princess Ruth Keʻelikōlani gifted her 3.9 acres and later an additional 1.3 acres at a later date. These lands were inherited from Princess Ruth's father Kekūanaōʻa. Princess Likelike named the estate ʻĀinahau (cool land) after the cool winds blowing down from the Manoa Valley and composed a song about her new home. Hawaiian linguist Mary Kawena Pukui claimed that the name means "hau tree land" or "land of the hau tree", after the hau trees (Hibiscus tiliaceus) growing along the ʻĀpuakēhau Stream which gave shade to the estate. The confusion is due to the fact that hau means both cool and the hibiscus tree in Hawaiian.

ʻĀinahau was initially a country estate while family lived in a mansion on Emma Street in downtown Honolulu, where Kaʻiulani was born. Her father sold the Emma Street residence to Scots-Irish industrialist James Campbell in 1878 and relocated the family to the country estate.

Cleghorn built a two-story home on the estate. It was furnished with two grand pianos, elaborate brocade chairs, gold and glass cabinets and fixtures. Also, there were various art collections displayed on the walls and rooms. From ʻĀinahau, the Cleghorn family would entertain Hawaiʻi's prestigious social circles.

Cleghorn collected flowers and trees from all over the world, planted in various gardens on the estate. These included date palms, Washington palms, mango and teak trees, Monterey cypress, cinnamon and croton trees, and other types of trees. He also planted fourteen types of hibiscus, Princess Likelike's favorite gardenia flowers and Kaʻiulani's signature flower, the pikake or Jasmine flowers. A large banyan tree in front of the main house became known as the Kaʻiulani's banyan, which was the progenitor of all later banyan trees in Honolulu.

A stable was built for several horses, including quarters for Kaʻiulani's prized pony named Fairy. ʻĀinahau was made famous in later years for its many peacocks that roamed freely on its grounds. Kaʻiulani would be called the "Princess of Peacocks" in legend.

Kaʻiulani became mistress of ʻĀinahau at the age of 12, upon the death of her mother Princess Likelike. As mistress of ʻĀinahau, she grew fond of the company of the Scottish poet and author Robert Louis Stevenson, who stayed at ʻĀinahau over the course of Kaʻiualani's childhood.

The estate was sold in 1917 and subdivided after plans to turn it into a park fell through. The house burned down in 1921 due to what was thought to be a gas leak.

== Later development ==
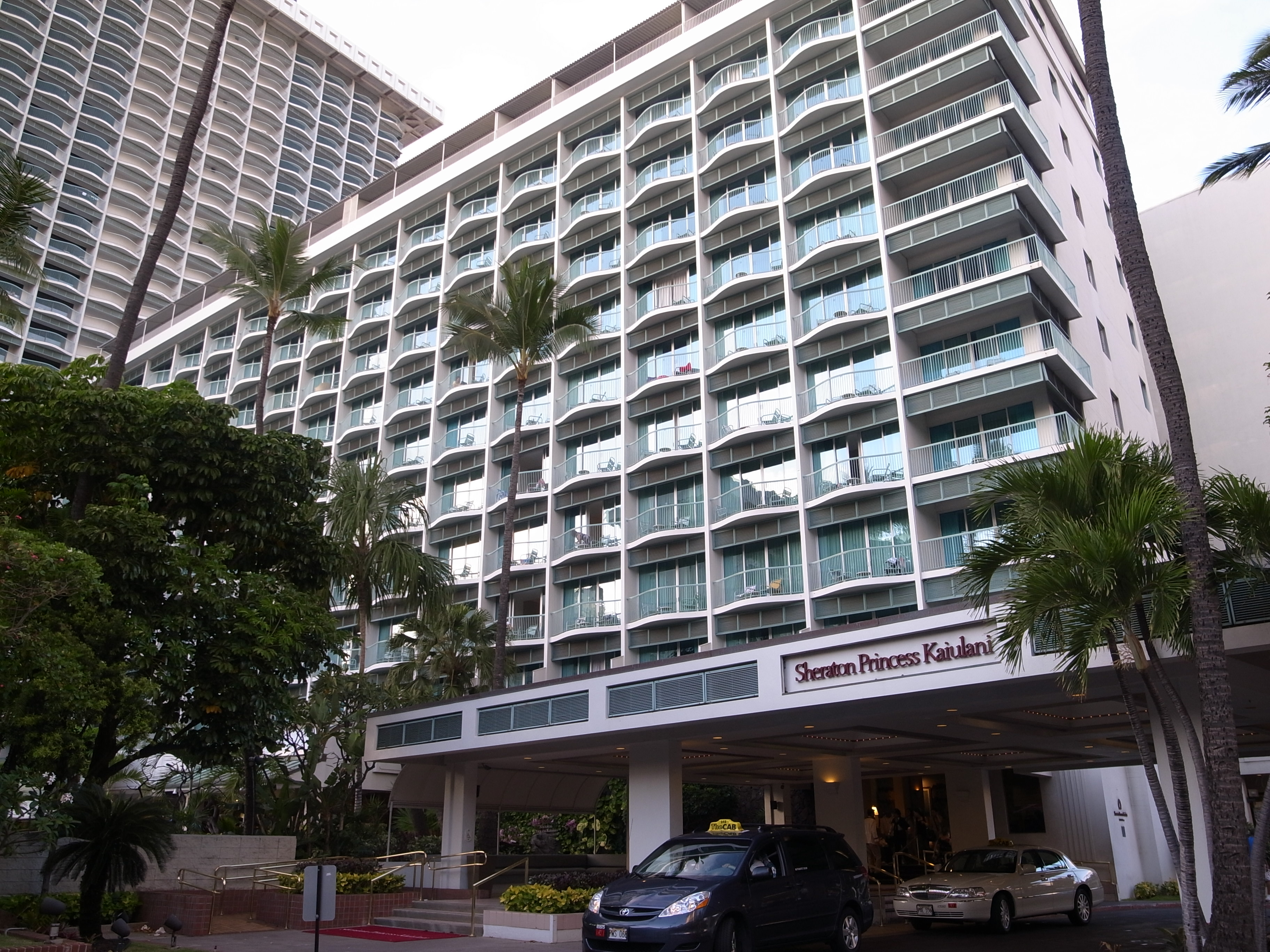
The Sheraton Princess Kaiulani Hotel, currently on the site. Original 1955 wing in foreground, 1970 Ainahau Tower in background.

The site was later developed by the owners of the Moana Hotel, located across Kalākaua Avenue, which had been built towards the end of Kaʻiulani's life. In 1925, wood frame bungalows for the Moana were constructed on the site of ʻĀinahau. The bungalows were demolished in 1953 and the Matson Line constructed the Princess Kaiulani Hotel, which opened on 11 June 1955. The 11-story building was the tallest in Hawaii at the time.

In 1959, Matson sold their hotels to Sheraton Hotels. They added a second wing to the successful Princess Kaiulani Hotel in 1960, with 210 additional rooms. The hotel was sold to Kyo-Ya Company Limited in July 1963, though Sheraton continued to operate it. Kyo-Ya added a third wing, the 29-story Ainahau Tower, in 1970. Later in the 1970s, they renamed the hotel the Sheraton Princess Kaiulani Hotel.

== Bibliography ==
- ENVIRONMENTAL IMPACT STATEMENT PREPARATION NOTICE: PRINCESS KAʻIULANI RENOVATION & DEVELOPMENT AND THE REPLACEMENT OF THE MOANA SURFRIDER HOTEL DIAMOND HEAD TOWER WITH A NEW TOWER (PDF). Honolulu: Kyo-ya Hotel & Resorts, LP. February 2009.
- Feeser, Andrea; Chan, Gaye (2006). Waikiki: A History of Forgetting and Remembering. Honolulu: University of Hawaii Press. ISBN 978-0-8248-2979-7. JSTOR ctt6wqr1w. OCLC 1090204874.
- Kam, Ralph Thomas (2011). "The Legacy of ʻĀinahau: The Genealogy of Kaʻiulani's Banyan". The Hawaiian Journal of History. 45. Honolulu: Hawaiian Historical Society: 49–68. hdl:10524/33781. OCLC 60626541.
- Kanahele, George S. (1979). Hawaiian Music and Musicians: An Illustrated History. University Press of Hawaii. ISBN 978-0-8248-0578-4. OCLC 903648649.
- Kanahele, George S. (1995). Waikīkī, 100 B.C. to 1900 A.D.: An Untold Story. Honolulu: University of Hawaii Press. ISBN 978-0-8248-1790-9. OCLC 33009852.
- Liliuokalani (1898). Hawaii's Story by Hawaii's Queen, Liliuokalani. Boston: Lee and Shepard. ISBN 978-0-548-22265-2. OCLC 2387226.
- Linnea, Sharon (1999). Princess Kaʻiulani: Hope of a Nation, Heart of a People. Grand Rapids, MI: Eerdmans Young Readers. ISBN 978-0-8028-5088-1. OCLC 36727806.
- Mitchell, Aulii; Hazlett, Alexander Hazlett; Hammatt, Hallett H.; Shideler, David W. (April 2009). Cultural Impact Assessment Report for the Proposed Princess Kaʻiulani Redevelopment Project Waikīkī Ahupuaʻa, Kona District, Oʻahu TMK: [1] 2-6-022:001 and 041. Prepared for Kyo-ya Hotels and Resorts, LP (PDF). Honolulu: Kyo-ya Hotel & Resorts, LP.
- Peterson, Barbara Bennett, ed. (1984). Notable Women of Hawaii. Honolulu: University of Hawaii Press. ISBN 978-0-8248-0820-4. OCLC 11030010.
- Pukui, Mary Kawena; Elbert, Samuel H. (1986). Hawaiian Dictionary: Hawaiian-English, English-Hawaiian. Honolulu: University of Hawaii Press. ISBN 978-0-8248-0703-0. OCLC 12751521.
- Pukui, Mary Kawena; Elbert, Samuel H.; Mookini, Esther T. (1974). Place Names of Hawaii. Honolulu: University of Hawaii Press. ISBN 978-0-8248-0524-1. OCLC 1042464.
- Runyon, Rosanna; Yucha, Trevor; Shideler, David; Hammatt, Hallett H. (October 2009). Draft Archaeological Inventory Survey Report for the Proposed Princess Kaʻiulani Redevelopment Project Waikīkī Ahupuaʻa, Kona District, Oʻahu TMK: [1] 2-6-022:001 and 041. Prepared for Kyo-ya Hotels and Resorts, LP (PDF). Honolulu: Kyo-ya Hotel & Resorts, LP.
- Stassen-McLaughlin, Marilyn (1999). "Unlucky Star – Princess Kaʻiulani". The Hawaiian Journal of History. 33. Honolulu: Hawaiian Historical Society: 21–54. hdl:10524/450. OCLC 60626541.
- Webb, Nancy; Webb, Jean Francis (1998) [1962]. Kaiulani: Crown Princess of Hawaii. Honolulu: Mutual Publishing. ISBN 978-1-56647-206-7. OCLC 265217757.
