= Archibald Scott Cleghorn =

Scottish-Hawaiian politician (1835–1910)

The Honourable Archibald Scott Cleghorn
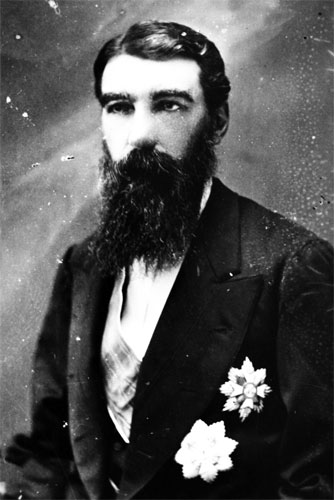

Governor of Oahu
- In office November 11, 1891 – February 28, 1893
- Monarch: Liliʻuokalani
- Preceded by: John Owen Dominis
- Succeeded by: Office abolished

Personal details
- Born: November 15, 1835 Edinburgh, Scotland
- Died: November 1, 1910 (aged 74) Honolulu, Territory of Hawaii
- Resting place: Royal Mausoleum of Hawaii
- Spouse: Princess Miriam K. Likelike
- Children: Rose, Helen, and Annie; Princess Victoria Kaʻiulani; and T. A. K.
- Parent(s): Thomas Cleghorn; Janet Nisbet
- Occupation: Businessman, Politician

Archibald Scott Cleghorn (November 15, 1835 – November 1, 1910) was a Scottish businessman who married into the royal family of the Hawaiian Kingdom.

== Biography ==
He was born on November 15, 1835, in Edinburgh, Scotland, to Thomas Cleghorn and wife, Janet Nisbet, the second of two sons. In 1841 Thomas was Superintendent of the Government Domain (Auckland Domain) in Auckland, New Zealand. Janet Cleghorn died in Auckland in 1845. In 1851, at the age of 16, Archie Cleghorn travelled with his father to Honolulu, where his father established a dry goods store. His father died within the year, but Archibald remained in Hawaii and continued running the store. His business prospered and he expanded to other islands.

Cleghorn became a citizen of the Hawaiian Kingdom in 1870. He married Princess Miriam K. Likelike who was 19 years old, sister of David Kalākaua, on September 22, 1870, at Washington Place. In 1874 Kalākaua became King, and Cleghorn's daughter Princess Victoria Kaiʻulani was the heir to the throne of the House of Kalākaua.

In 1877, Cleghorn and Princess Likelike arranged to donate the land surrounding the monument to Captain James Cook on Kealakekua Bay marking the site of his death, in trust to the government of the United Kingdom.

Cleghorn served in the House of Nobles from 1873 to 1888, and the Privy Council from 1873 to 1891. He acted as the Royal Governor of Oʻahu in July 1887, and was appointed to succeed Prince Consort John Owen Dominis upon his death in November 1891, until February 28, 1893. He was the president of the Kapiʻolani Park Association since 1888, and first parks commissioner for the City & County of Honolulu in 1900. He served as a trustee of The Queen's Medical Center from 1905 to 1909.

=== The Hawaiian Overthrow ===
Leading up to the 1893 overthrow, Cleghorn grew increasingly frustrated with Liliʻuokalani who he felt failed to see the seriousness of the political situation. He blamed Liliʻuokalani for not heeding his advice during the days leading up to the coup. In his diary, Cleghorn noted a British sympathizer had asked Liliʻuokalani to abdicate in favor of Princess Victoria Kaʻiulani and he later wrote to his daughter that if the queen had abdicated on the night of 16th or the morning of the 17th, the monarchy would have been saved.

On January 16, the day before the overthrow, he met privately with Thurston and requested his group respect Kaʻiulani's claim to throne and suggested installing her as queen with a board of regents as an alternative to overthrowing the monarchy. Thurston replied that the "matters have proceeded too far for your plan to be an adequate answer to this situation. We are going to abrogate the Monarchy entirely, and nothing can be done to stop us, so far as I can see!" Thurston noted that after their conversation Cleghorn looked as though he were about to cry and bowed his head in silence as he left. Historian Ralph Simpson Kuykendall noted that "Governor Cleghorn's meager diary for the early part of 1893 suggests the picture of an anguished father frantically trying to save his beloved daughter from the unhappy fate which had befallen her through no fault of her own."

Cleghorn took an oath of allegiance under protest to the Provisional Government of Hawaii led by Sanford B. Dole in order to retain his position as Collector General of Customs. He was ridiculed in the Hawaiian press for this move by Royalist Clarence W. Ashford. Cleghorn also helped the new government in enforcing the oath of allegiance with existing governmental employees at the custom house and signed his letter to his superior with "Your obedient servant". He later resigned on April 15 and was replaced by annexationist James Bicknell Castle.

== ʻĀinahau and Stones of Kapaemahu ==
In 1878 Cleghorn sold his residence in Honolulu and moved his family to ʻĀinahau, an estate in Waikiki built on land gifted by Princess Ruth Keʻelikōlani to his daughter Kaʻiulani. There he built a two-story home and planted gardens with flowers and trees from all over the world, including the progenitor of all banyan trees in Hawaiʻi. Cleghorn also purchased an adjacent beachfront lot on which was located a stone to which Likelike and Kaʻiulani offered lei and prayers before bathing in the sea. This was one of the Kapaemahu, large stones devoted to the four legendary māhū who brought the healing arts from Tahiti to Hawaiʻi. Cleghorn's will stated that “the historical stones now upon the premises last above mentioned shall not be defaced or removed from said premises."

== Death ==
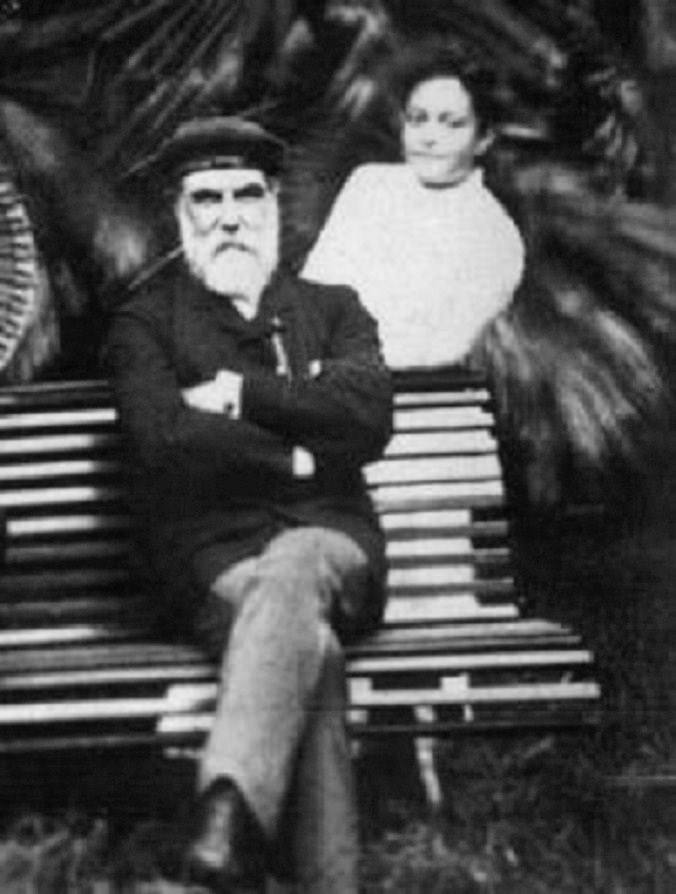
Cleghorn and his daughter Kaʻiulani at the ʻĀinahau estate, 1887.

Cleghorn died of a heart attack on November 1, 1910, at the ʻĀinahau royal estate. He was buried in the Kalākaua Crypt of the Royal Mausoleum of Hawaii.

His downtown Honolulu estate became the home of The Pacific Club in 1926.

Cleghorn willed the estate of ʻĀinahau to the Territory of Hawaii for a park to honor his daughter Ka‘iulani. However, the territorial legislature, reluctant to manage the property, used a specification that the park would have to close each night at 6:00PM as a technicality to refuse the gift. The property was subsequently subdivided and sold with the Victorian mansion at ʻĀinahau becoming a hotel and then a rental property before it burned down on August 2, 1921.

== Children ==
Besides his daughter Kaʻiulani, Cleghorn had a number of children out of wedlock.

With a Hawaiian woman, Elizabeth “Lapeka” Kahalaunani Pauahi Grimes, Cleghorn had three daughters: Cleghorn and Lapeka later separated.

- Rose Hilda Kaipuala Cleghorn (July 15, 1859 – February 27, 1911), on July 20, 1876 married James William Robertson (1852–1919), chamberlain to Kalākaua and Liliuokalani and founder of the Evening Bulletin newspaper that later merged with the Daily Star to become the Honolulu Star-Bulletin
- Helen Caroline Maniʻiailehua (or Maunuilehua or Manuʻailehua) Cleghorn (December 17, 1863 – August 9, 1927), on August 16, 1888 married James Harbottle Boyd (1858–1915)
- Annie Pauahi Cleghorn (July 28, 1868 – March 6, 1897), on December 20, 1890 married James Hay Wodehouse, Jr (1861–1913), son to the British ambassador to Hawaii James Hay Wodehouse, Sr.

With another Hawaiian woman Annie Ana Makanui (died 1904):

- Thomas Alexander Kaulaʻahi Cleghorn (March 11, 1899 – October 22, 1984), who married first Claire Rogers and later Nellie Yarnell Maxwell. He and his second wife adopted Melinda Lee Kaiulani as their adoptive granddaughter.

== Bibliography ==
- Askman, Douglas V. (2008). "Her Majesty's Disloyal Opposition: An Examination of the English-Language Version of Robert Wilcox's the Liberal, 1892–1893" (PDF). The Hawaiian Journal of History. 42. Honolulu: Hawaiian Historical Society: 177–200. hdl:10524/135. OCLC 60626541. Archived from the original (PDF) on June 26, 2020.
- Kuykendall, Ralph Simpson (1967). The Hawaiian Kingdom 1874–1893, The Kalākaua Dynasty. Vol. 3. Honolulu: University of Hawaii Press. ISBN 978-0-87022-433-1. OCLC 500374815.
- Liliʻuokalani (1898). Hawaii's Story by Hawaii's Queen, Liliʻuokalani. Boston: Lee and Shepard. ISBN 978-0-548-22265-2. OCLC 2387226.
- Linnea, Sharon (1999). Princess Kaʻiulani: Hope of a Nation, Heart of a People. Grand Rapids, MI: Eerdmans Young Readers. ISBN 978-0-8028-5088-1. OCLC 36727806.
- Mitchell, Aulii; Hazlett, Alexander Hazlett; Hammatt, Hallett H.; Shideler, David W. (April 2009). Cultural Impact Assessment Report for the Proposed Princess Kaʻiulani Redevelopment Project Waikīkī Ahupuaʻa, Kona District, Oʻahu TMK: [1] 2-6-022:001 and 041. Prepared for Kyo-ya Hotels and Resorts, LP (PDF). Honolulu: Kyo-ya Hotel & Resorts, LP.
- Runyon, Rosanna; Yucha, Trevor; Shideler, David; Hammatt, Hallett H. (October 2009). Draft Archaeological Inventory Survey Report for the Proposed Princess Kaʻiulani Redevelopment Project Waikīkī Ahupuaʻa, Kona District, Oʻahu TMK: [1] 2-6-022:001 and 041. Prepared for Kyo-ya Hotels and Resorts, LP (PDF). Honolulu: Kyo-ya Hotel & Resorts, LP.
- Thomas, Jean (1991). A History of the Customs Service in Hawaii, 1789–1989. Honolulu: Department of the Treasury, United States Customs Service, Pacific Region. OCLC 25424516.
- Thurston, Lorrin A. (1936). Farrell, Andrew (ed.). Memoirs of the Hawaiian Revolution. Honolulu: Honolulu, Advertiser Publishing Company. OCLC 6128790.
- Webb, Nancy; Webb, Jean Francis (1998) [1962]. Kaʻiulani: Crown Princess of Hawaii. Honolulu: Mutual Publishing. ISBN 978-1-56647-206-7. OCLC 265217757.
- Zambucka, Kristin (1998). Princess Ka'iulani of Hawaiʻi: The Monarchy's Last Hope. Honolulu: Mutual Publishing. ISBN 978-1-56647-710-9. OCLC 149442849.

Government offices
Preceded by John Owen Dominis	Royal Governor of Oʻahu; 1891–1893	Succeeded by Joseph J. Fern as Mayor of Honolulu
