= Ron Rewald =

Convicted fraudster (1942–2017)

- Born: Ronald Rewald; September 24, 1942; Milwaukee, Wisconsin
- Died: December 2017 (aged 75); Los Angeles, California
- Occupations: Investment adviser, football player, alleged CIA agent
- Status: Released in 1995
- Criminal charges: Wire fraud and mail fraud
- Penalty: 80 years imprisonment

Ronald Rewald (September 24, 1942 – December 2017) was a Hawaii investment advisor, professional football player and self-described CIA agent who was convicted of wire fraud and mail fraud in 1985.

== Football career ==
According to Rewald, he attended the Massachusetts Institute of Technology, then spent a year working for the CIA monitoring underground anti-government activity at the University of Wisconsin–Madison before leaving the CIA and attending Marquette University, where he played football. There is evidence that this was a fabrication and that he only attended Milwaukee Area Technical College.

Rewald's football skills did attract interest from professional teams in the National and American Football Leagues. He signed with the Cleveland Browns in 1965 and trained with the Kansas City Chiefs in 1966. In 1965 Rewald played halfback for the West Allis Racers in the Central States Football League while on a one-year leave of absence from the Chiefs.

After his football career ended, Rewald became president of a sporting goods store in Wisconsin called College Athletic and expanded the business across Illinois, Minnesota and Ohio before selling the franchise and moving to Hawaii with his wife and five children.

== Bishop, Baldwin, Rewald, Dillingham and Wong ==
In 1978 Rewald established an investment firm in Hawaii called "Bishop, Baldwin, Rewald, Dillingham and Wong". The firm's name incorporated the names of Rewald and his partner Sunlin Wong along with the names of three prominent kama'aina who had no connection with the business: Charles Reed Bishop, Henry Alexander Baldwin and Benjamin Dillingham. The firm claimed that funds were guaranteed by the Federal Deposit Insurance Corporation up to $150,000 and that minimum returns of 20% annually were guaranteed. (As the firm was not a chartered bank it was not eligible for FDIC insurance.)

In 1983, the Internal Revenue Service began an investigation of Rewald when his firm's false FDIC insurance claims were discovered. On July 29, 1983, Rewald attempted suicide at the Sheraton Waikiki Hotel, allegedly because the media was on the verge of exposing his background. Six days later, the company was forced into bankruptcy. Rewald was arrested on August 8, 1983, immediately after his release from the hospital, and was charged with theft by deception. He was held in lieu of $10 million bail. He faced 98 charges and a maximum of 400 years in prison. Sunlin Wong pleaded guilty and was sentenced to two years imprisonment.

In reality, the investment firm had been a Ponzi scheme. Rewald used money from new investors to pay interest to earlier investors, all the while siphoning off funds to pay for his lavish lifestyle.

In addition to its Hawaii operation, the firm had also opened a branch in Auckland, New Zealand in 1983. New Zealand television reports have suggested that Rewald or his firm was involved in the Māori loan affair of 1986–87.

== Trial ==
Rewald presented a surprising defense, claiming that his business had been a front for the Central Intelligence Agency. Rewald's trial lasted for eleven weeks in 1985. 140 witnesses were called. Rewald was convicted on 94 counts of fraud, perjury, and tax evasion and sentenced to 80 years in prison.

== Release ==
In 1995 Rewald was released on parole from the Federal Correctional Institution on Terminal Island, California. Rewald remained on parole until 2001. In 2010, Rewald lived in Los Angeles and worked as director of operations for the APA talent agency in Beverly Hills. A company official confirmed his death to the Honolulu Star-Advertiser in March 2018.
