= Moana Hotel =

- U.S. National Register of Historic Places
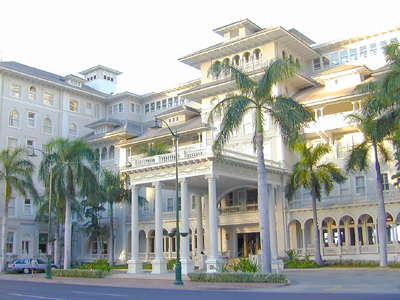
- Moana Hotel entrance
- Location: Honolulu
- Coordinates: 21°16′35.4″N 157°49′35.9″W
- Built: 1901; 125 years ago
- Architect: Oliver G. Traphagen
- Architectural style: Hawaiian Gothic
- Website: www.marriott.com/hotels/travel/hnlwi-moana-surfrider-a-westin-resort-and-spa-waikiki-beach/
- NRHP reference No.: 72000417
- Added to NRHP: August 7, 1972

The Moana Hotel is a historic hotel building in Honolulu, Hawaii, located at 2365 Kalākaua Avenue in the Waikiki neighborhood. Built in the late 19th century as the first hotel in Waikiki, the Moana opened in 1901. It is listed on the National Register of Historic Places. The hotel was also inducted into Historic Hotels of America, the official program of the National Trust for Historic Preservation, in 1989. The building is currently part of the resort complex known as Moana Surfrider, A Westin Resort & Spa and is managed by Westin Hotels & Resorts.

== History ==
=== Moana Hotel ===
The wealthy Honolulu landowner Walter Chamberlain Peacock, in an effort to establish a fine resort in the previously neglected Waikiki area of Honolulu, incorporated the Moana Hotel Company in 1896. Working with a design by architect Oliver G. Traphagen and $150,000 in capital, The Lucas Brothers contractors completed the structure in 1901. Construction of The Moana marked the beginning of tourism in Waikiki, becoming the first hotel amidst the bungalows and beach houses. In Hawaiian, moana means open sea or ocean.

The Moana's architecture was influenced by European styles popular at the time, with Ionic columns and intricate woodwork and plaster detailing throughout the building. The Moana was designed with a grand porte cochere on the street side and wide lānais on the ocean side. Some of the 75 guest rooms had telephones and bathrooms (unusual at the time), and the hotel featured a billiard room, saloon, main parlor, reception area, and library. Peacock installed the first electric-powered elevator in the islands at the Moana, which is still in use. Design features of the original structure that survive to this day include extra-wide hallways (to accommodate steamer trunks), high ceilings, and cross-ventilation windows (to cool the rooms prior to air conditioning).

The Moana officially opened on March 11, 1901. Its first guests were a group of Shriners, who paid $1.50 per night for their rooms. Peacock did not find success with his endeavor and sold the hotel on May 2, 1905 to Alexander Young, a prominent Honolulu businessman who also owned the adjacent Honolulu Seaside Hotel and the Alexander Young Hotel in downtown Honolulu. After Young died in 1910, his Territorial Hotel Company operated the hotel.

The Moana grew along with the popularity of Hawaiian tourism. Two floors were added in 1918, along with Italian Renaissance-styled concrete wings on each side of the hotel, creating its H-shape seen today. In 1925, the hotel opened a series of wood frame bungalows on a large plot of land directly across Kalakaua Avenue, where the ʻĀinahau estate of Princess Kaʻiulani had been located.

The Matson Navigation Company and Castle & Cooke bought a controlling interest in the Territorial Hotel Company in 1925, in order to demolish their Honolulu Seaside Hotel and construct the Royal Hawaiian Hotel on the site. Tourism to Hawaii collapsed due to the Great Depression and the Territorial Hotel Company declared bankruptcy in September 1933, with Matson assuming control of their hotels through its Hawaii Properties Ltd. division, and Castle & Cooke writing off their investment.

Throughout the 1930s, the hotel was known as the Moana-Seaside Hotel & Bungalows, taking on the name of its demolished neighbor.

In 1941, Hawaii Properties Ltd. was dissolved and Matson assumed direct control of the hotel.

The hotel's outward appearance was altered slightly over the years, including "updates" to such designs as Art Deco in the 1930s and Bauhaus in the 1950s.

From 1935 to 1975, the Moana's courtyard hosted the Hawaii Calls live radio broadcast. Legend has it that listeners mistook the hiss of the radio transmission as the waves breaking on the beach. Upon learning of this, the host instructed the sound man to run down to the waterfront to actually record the sound, which became a staple of the show.

In 1952, Matson built a new hotel adjacent to the Moana on the southeast side, called the SurfRider Hotel. In 1953, Matson demolished the Moana's bungalows across the street and, two years later, opened the new Princess Kaiulani Hotel on the site. Matson sold all of their Waikiki hotel properties to the Sheraton Hotels and Resorts in 1959.

Sheraton sold the Moana and the SurfRider to Japanese industrialist Kenji Osano and his Kyo-Ya Company in December 1963 for $10.7 million, though Sheraton continued to manage them. In 1969, Kyo-Ya built a towering new hotel on the Moana's northwest side. They named it the Surfrider Hotel. The older SurfRider Hotel on the other side was turned into part of the Moana, named the Diamond Head Wing.

=== Moana Surfrider ===
In 1989, a $50 million restoration restored the Moana to its 1901 appearance and incorporated the 1969 Sheraton Surfrider Hotel and the 1952 SurfRider Hotel buildings with the 1901 Moana Hotel building into one beachfront resort, the Sheraton Moana Surfrider. The property has been recognized with the President's Historic Preservation Award, the National Preservation Honor Award, the Hawaii Renaissance Award, and the Hotel Sales and Marketing Association International Golden Bell Award. The main historic 1901 section of the hotel, the Banyan Wing, has been listed on the National Register of Historic Places.

The hotel was the base of operations for about 24 White House staff members who accompanied President Barack Obama to his Winter White House at Plantation Estate during Christmas visits.

In 2007, Starwood Hotels & Resorts, the management company of the Moana, rebranded the hotel from Sheraton Hotels and Resorts to Westin Hotels & Resorts. The name of the hotel became Moana Surfrider, A Westin Resort & Spa. The low-rise 1952 wing was renamed the Diamond Wing. The 1969 wing was renamed the Tower Wing.

On November 12, 2024, Moana Surfrider hotel workers ratified a new contract.

In May 2026, the entire property completed a major renovation. The 1952 wing was renamed the Surfrider Wing, returning it to its original name.

== The banyan tree ==
In the center of the Moana Surfrider's courtyard stands a large banyan tree. The Indian banyan tree was planted in 1904 by Jared Smith, Director of the Department of Agriculture Experiment Station. When planted, the tree was nearly seven feet tall and about seven years old. It now stands 75 feet (23 m) high and spans 150 feet (46 m) across the courtyard.

In 1979, the historic tree was one of the first to be listed on Hawaii's Rare and Exceptional Tree List. It has also been selected by the Board of Trustees of the America the Beautiful Fund as the site for a Hawaii Millennium Landmark Tree designation, which selects one historic tree in each state for protection in the new millennium.

== Hotel lore ==
=== Rich and famous ===
As soon as the Moana Hotel opened, a non-stop flood of tourists from the mainland United States poured through its doors. Its most famous guest came in 1920. The Prince of Wales, who would later become King Edward VIII, gallivanted around the Moana Hotel property and reportedly fell in love with the private pier, from which he frequently dove into the ocean.

In August 1922, author Agatha Christie and her husband, Colonel Archie Christie, stayed on holiday. They were traveling around the world as part of the Dominion Mission of the British Empire Exhibition, promoting the exhibition to be held in England in 1924.

In February 1905, Jane Stanford, co-founder of Stanford University, died of strychnine poisoning in a room at the Moana Hotel. Stanford is believed to have been murdered, but the source of the strychnine was never identified.

== Gallery ==
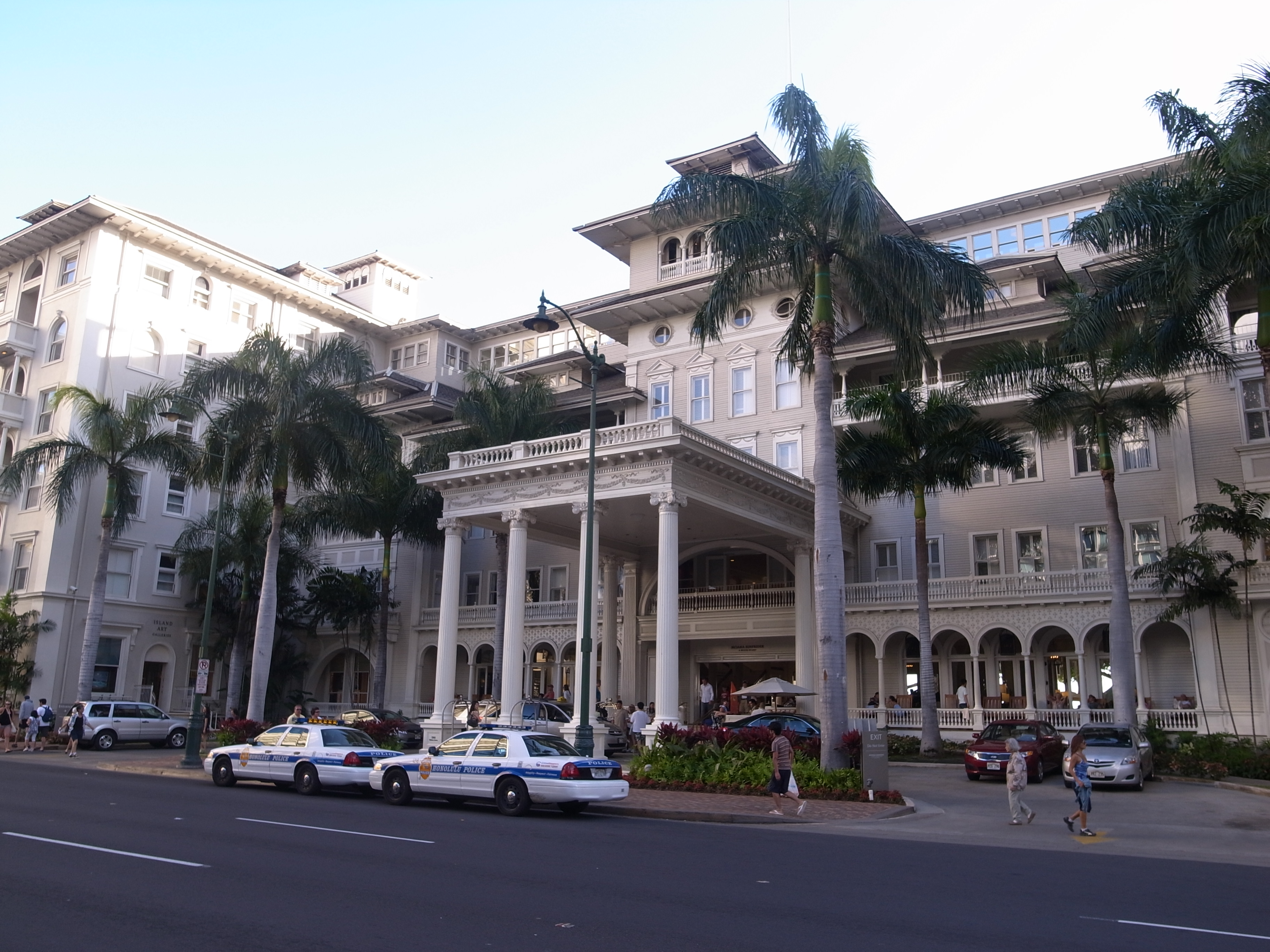
Original 1901 wing

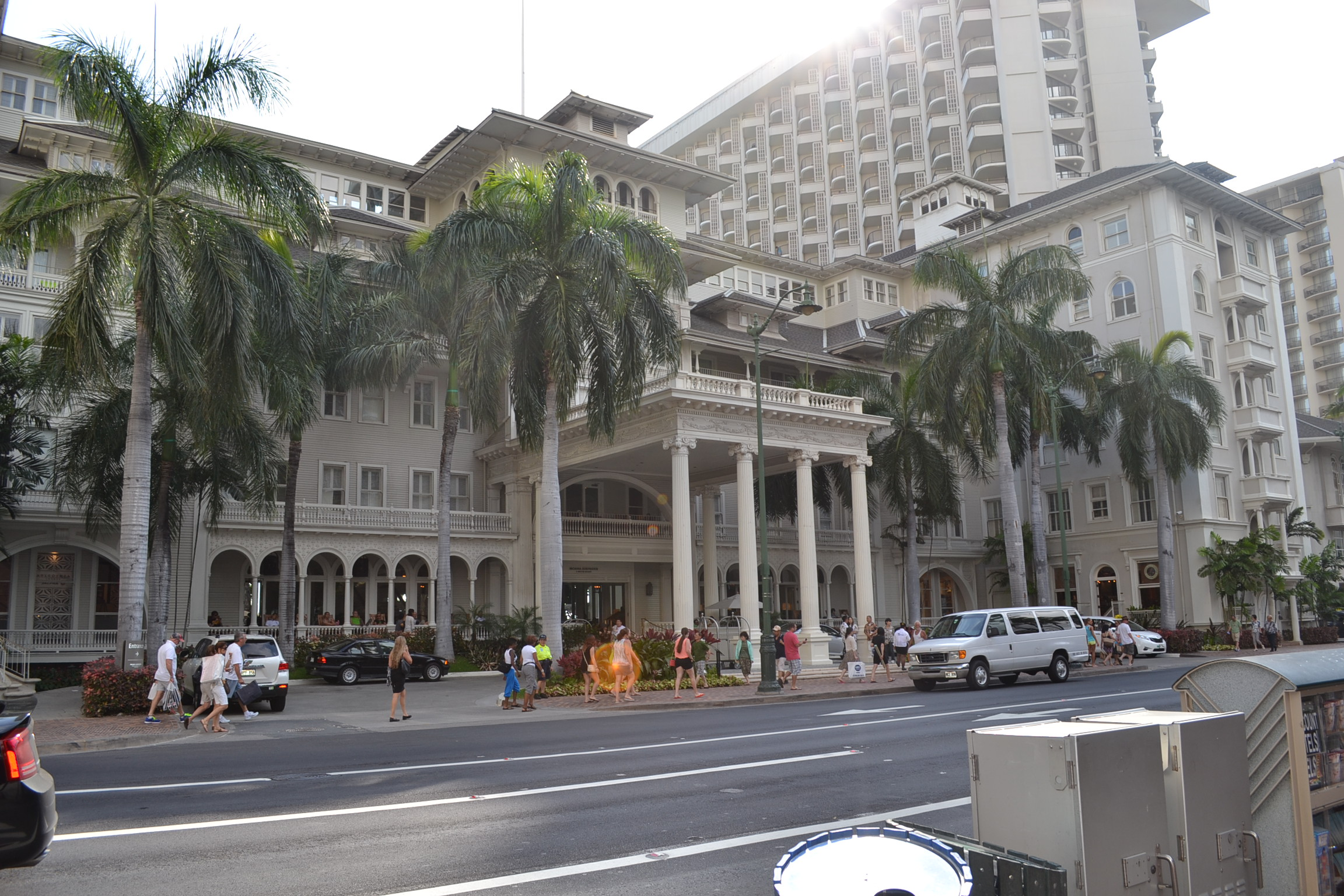
Moana, with 1969 Surfrider tower behind it

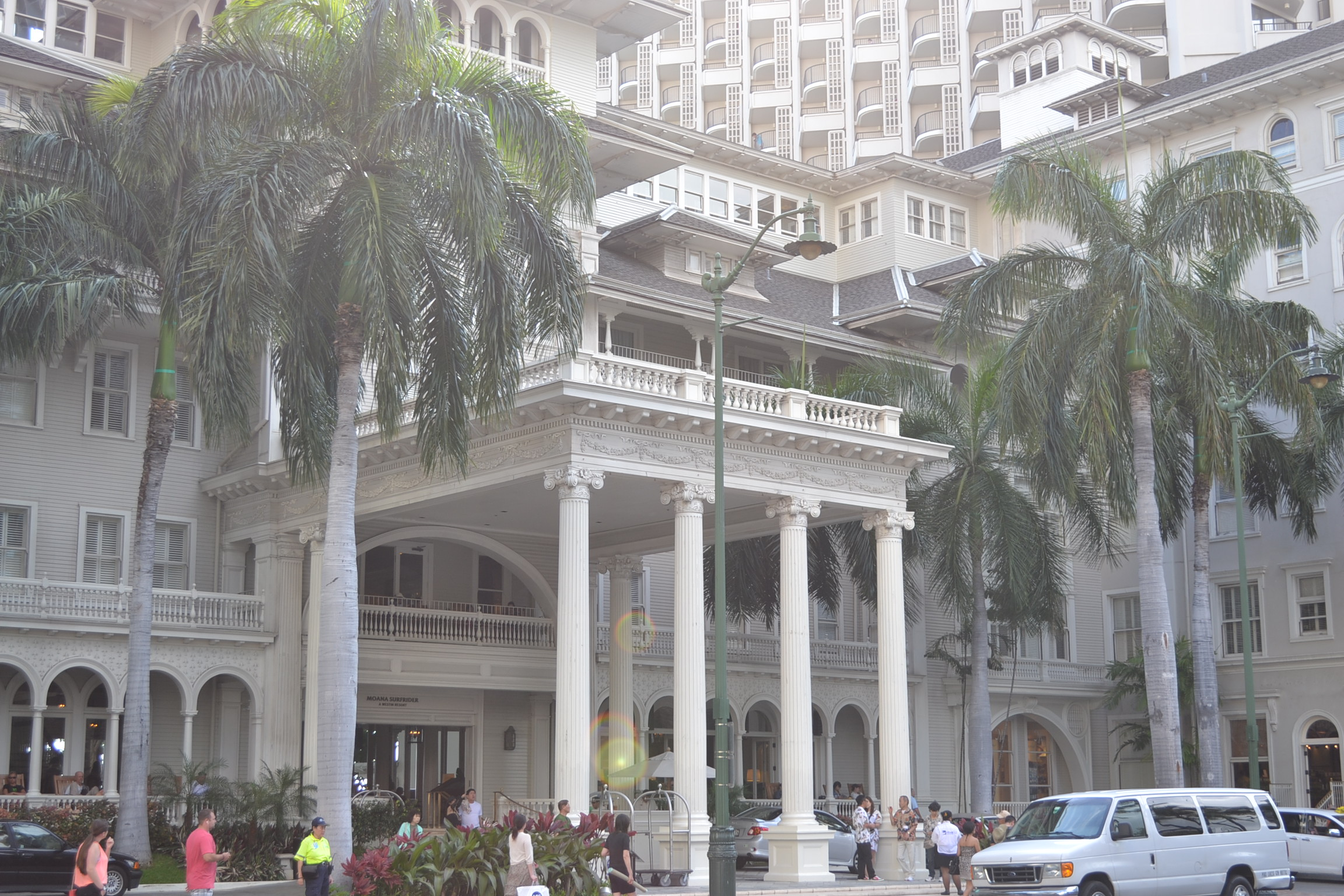
The porte cochere, recreated in the 1989 restoration.

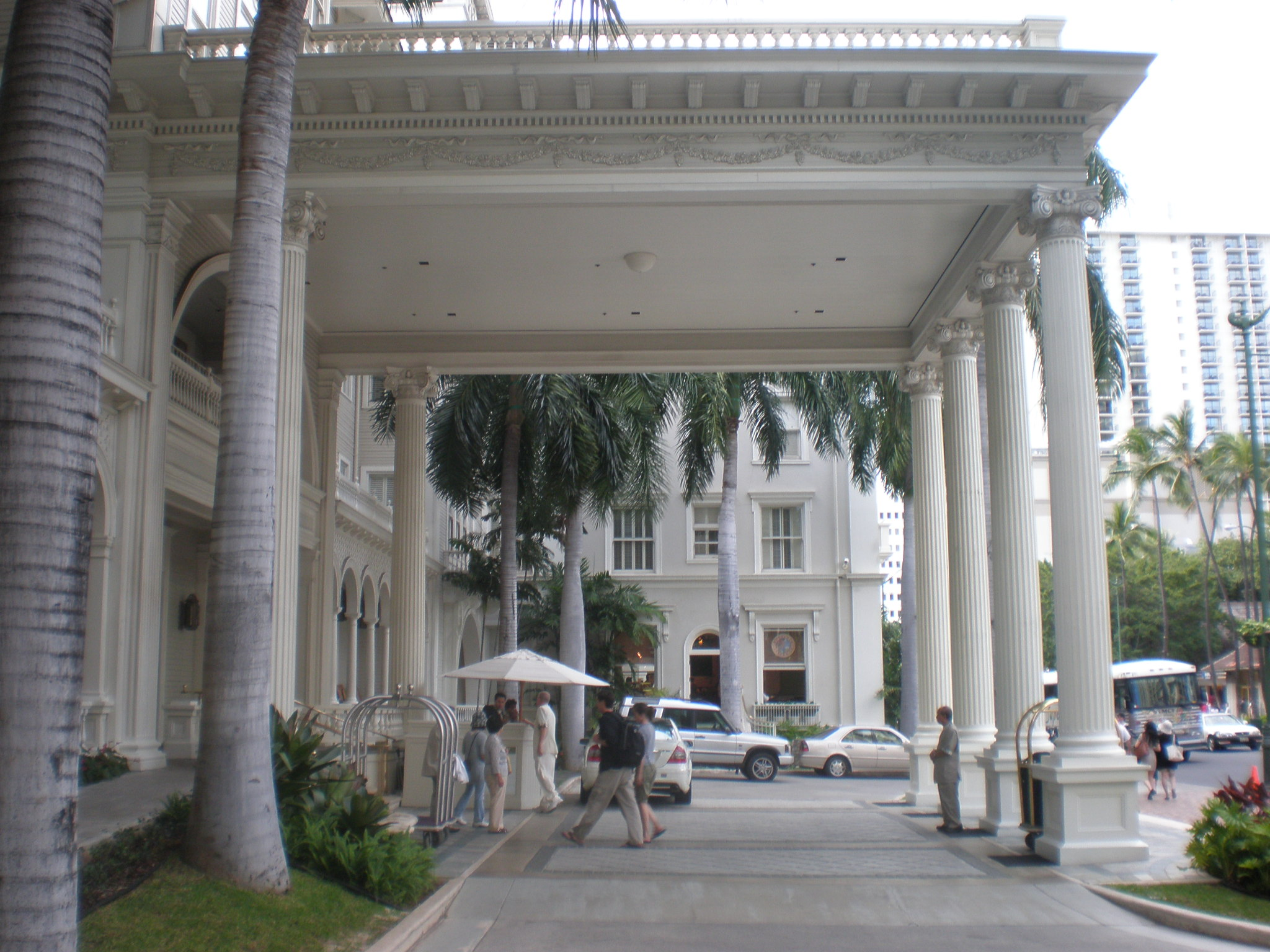
Porte cochere

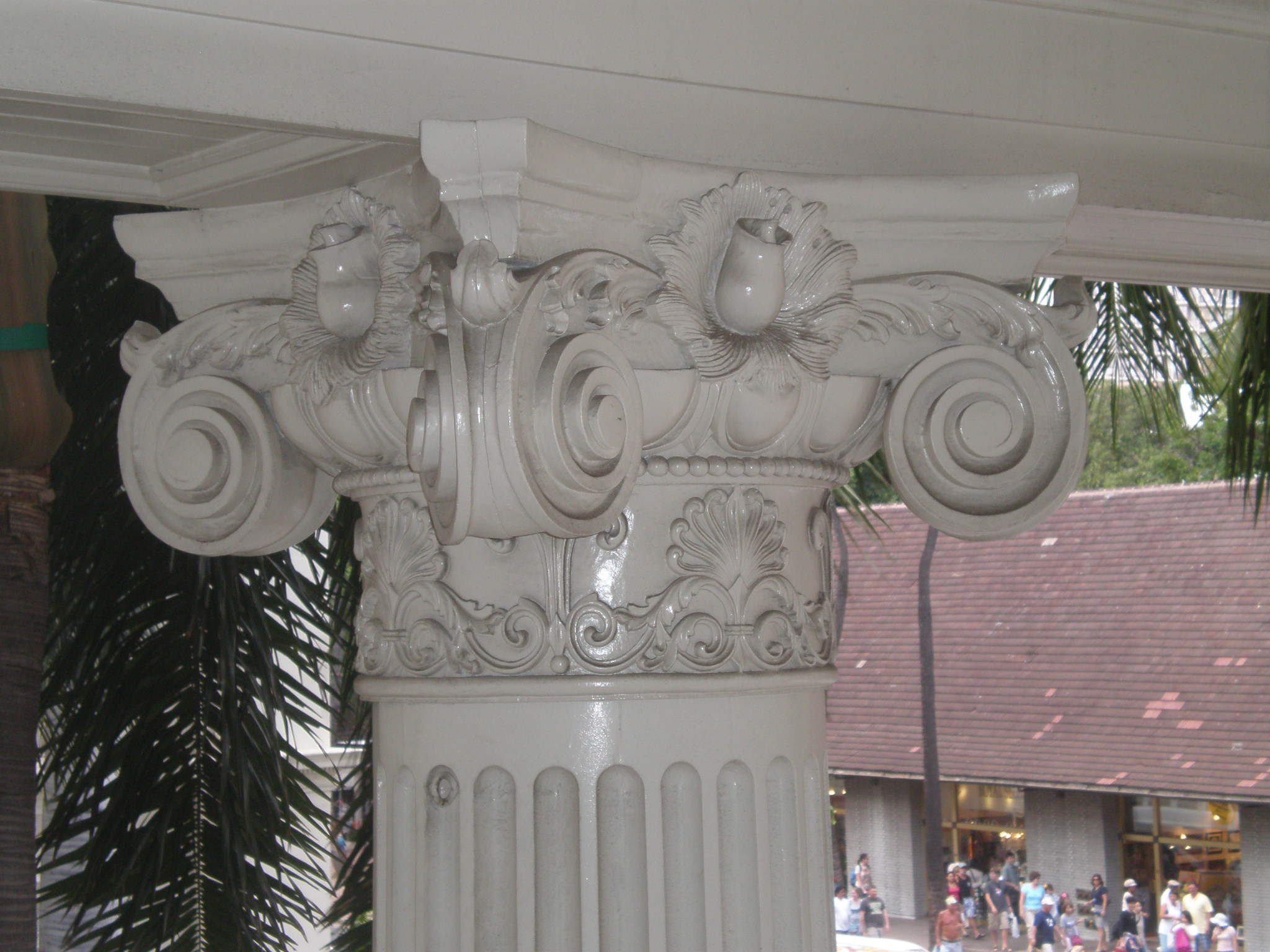
Capital of Corinthian column

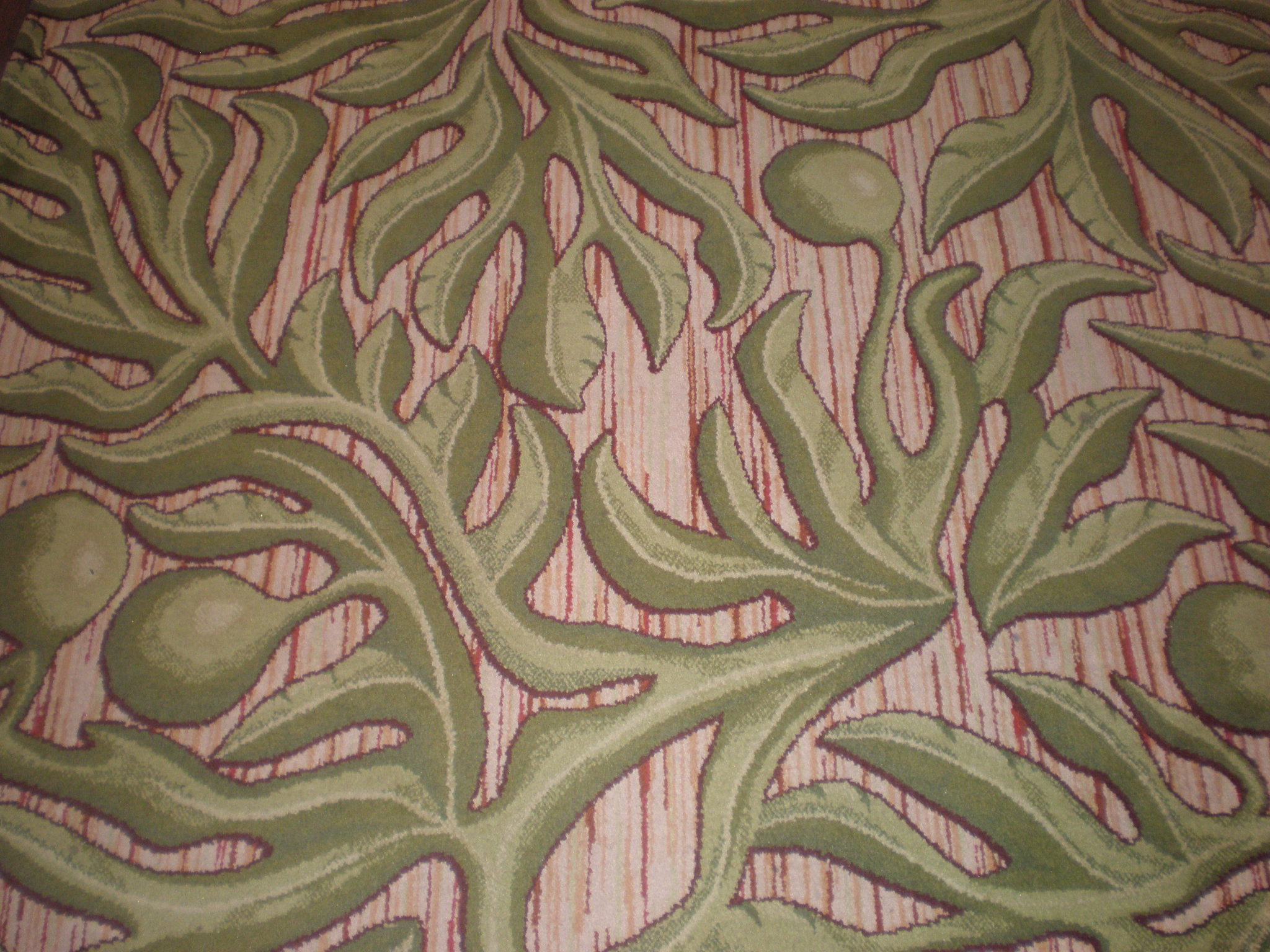
Carpet with breadfruit patterns

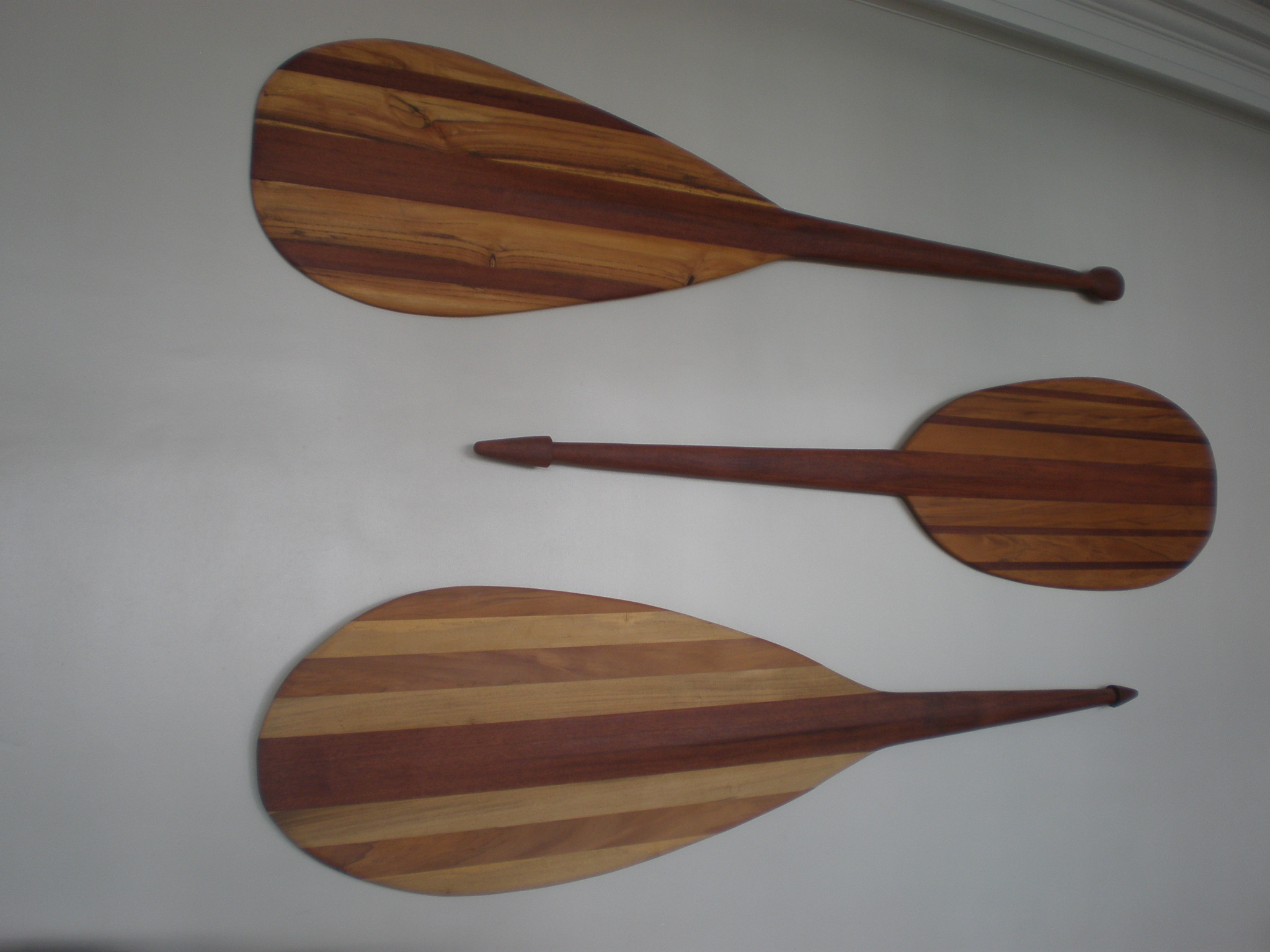
Hawaiian canoe paddles on wall

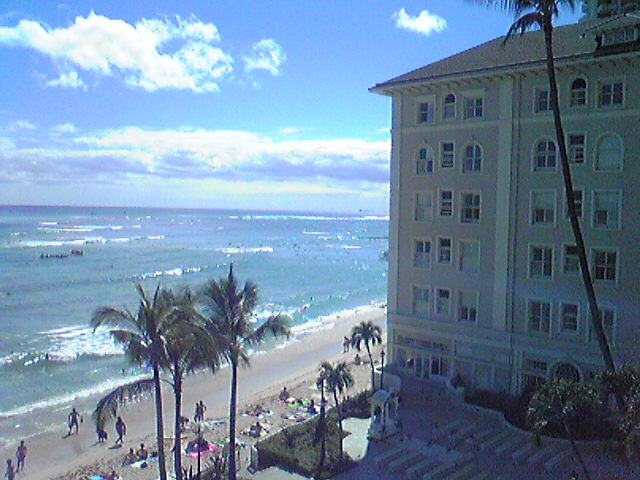
View from oceanfront guestroom

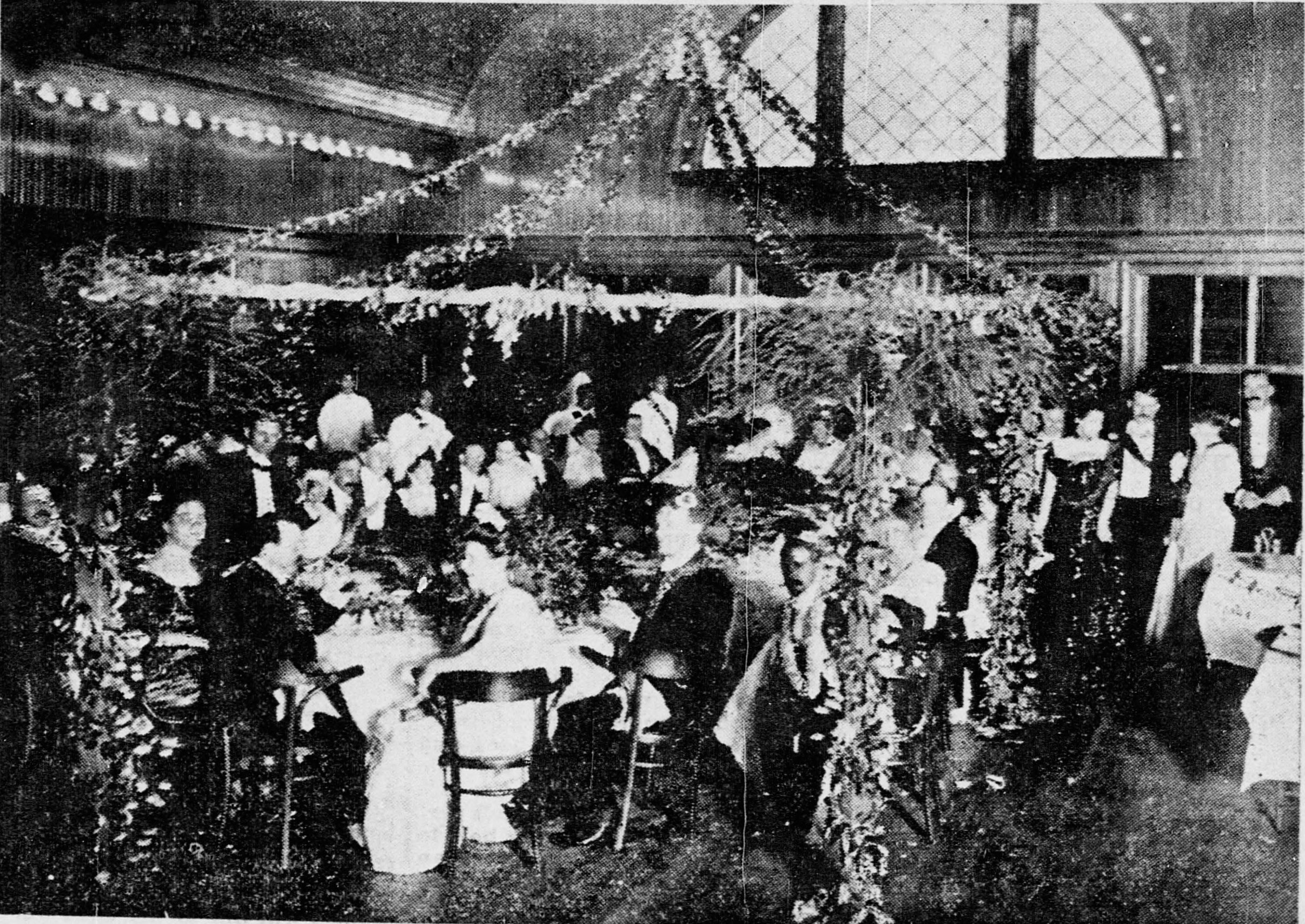
Banquet at the hotel, 1905
