= Sheraton Princess Kaiulani Hotel =

Resort hotel in Honolulu, Hawaii

Coordinates: 21.277533°N 157.825892°W

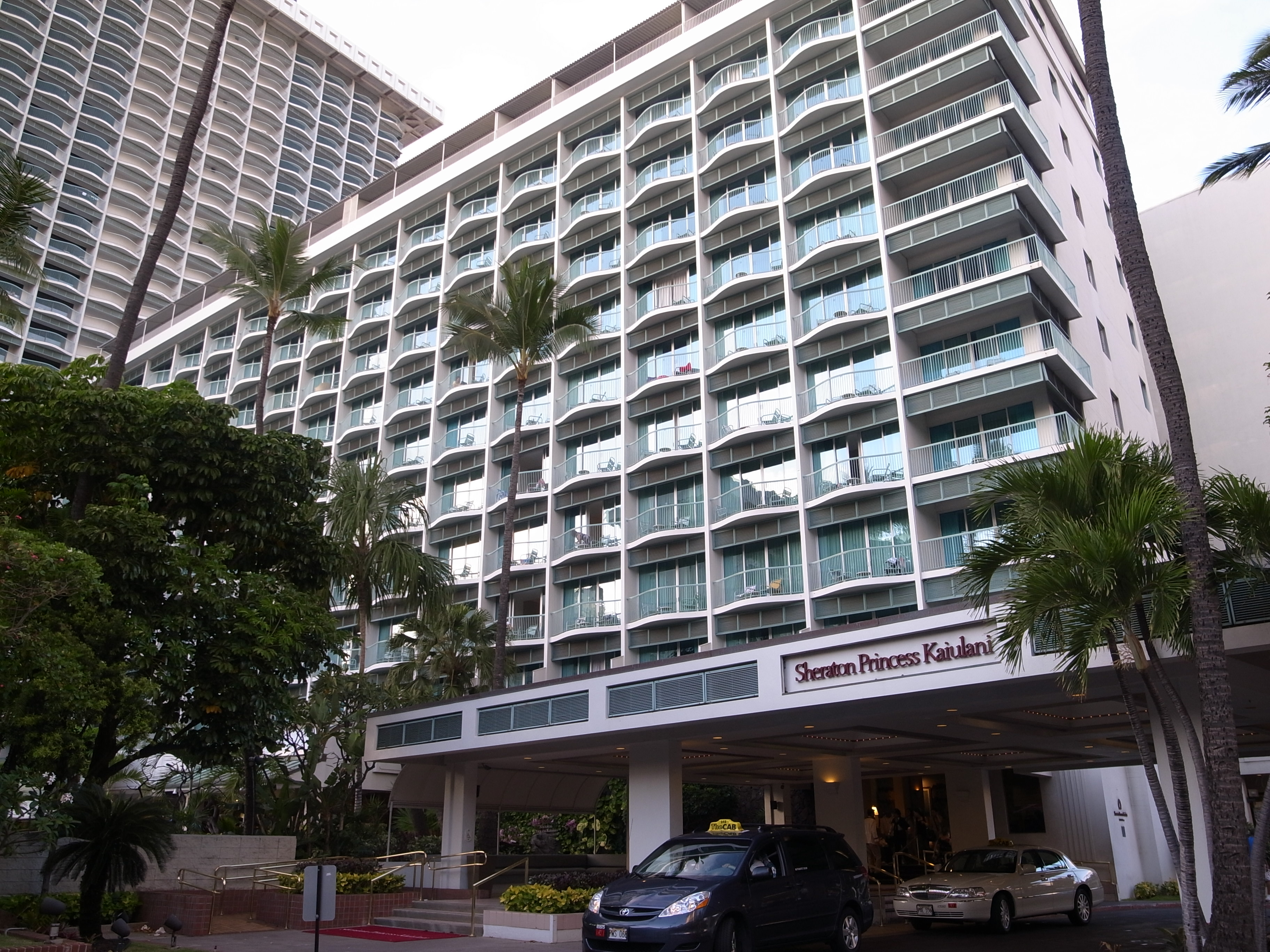
- Sheraton Princess Kaiulani Hotel. Original 1955 wing in foreground, 1970 Ainahau Tower in background.
- Interactive map of the Sheraton Princess Kaiulani Hotel area

General information
- Location: Honolulu, Hawaii, 120 Kaiulani Ave
- Opening: June 11, 1955
- Owner: Kyo-Ya Hotels & Resorts
- Management: Sheraton Hotels

Other information
- Number of rooms: 1142

Website
- Official website

The Sheraton Princess Kaiulani Hotel is a large resort hotel in Honolulu, Hawaii.

== Location ==
The hotel is located on the site of ʻĀinahau, the royal estate of Princess Victoria Kaʻiulani, heir to the throne of the Kingdom of Hawaiʻi.

== History ==
=== Demolitions ===
The estate was demolished in 1925 by the owners of the Moana Hotel, located across Kalakaua Avenue, for the construction of wood frame bungalows for the hotel.

The bungalows were demolished in 1953 and the Matson Line constructed the Princess Kaiulani Hotel on the site, which opened on June 11, 1955. The 11-story building was the tallest in Hawaii at the time.

=== Transfer of ownership ===
In 1959, Matson sold their hotels to Sheraton Hotels. Sheraton added a second wing to the successful Princess Kaiulani Hotel in 1960, the 210-room Diamond Head Wing.

The hotel was sold to Kyo-Ya Company Limited in July 1963, though Sheraton continued to operate it. Kyo-Ya added a third wing, the 29-story Ainahau Tower, in 1970. Later in the 1970s, they renamed the hotel the Sheraton Princess Kaiulani.

On November 12, 2024, workers at the Sheraton Princess Kaiulani Hotel ratified a new labor contract.
